= 1917 in Germany =

- Decades: 1890s; 1900s; 1910s; 1920s; 1930s
- See also: Other events of 1917; History of Germany • Timeline • Years

Events in the year 1917 in Germany.

== Incumbents ==
=== National level ===
- Emperor – Wilhelm II
- Chancellor – Theobald von Bethmann Hollweg to 13 July, then Georg Michaelis to 31 October, then from 1 November Georg von Hertling

=== State level ===
==== Kingdoms ====
- King of Bavaria – Ludwig III
- King of Prussia – Wilhelm II
- King of Saxony – Frederick Augustus III
- King of Württemberg – William II

==== Grand Duchies ====
- Grand Duke of Baden – Frederick II
- Grand Duke of Hesse – Ernest Louis
- Grand Duke of Mecklenburg-Schwerin – Frederick Francis IV
- Grand Duke of Mecklenburg-Strelitz – Adolphus Frederick VI
- Grand Duke of Oldenburg – Frederick Augustus II
- Grand Duke of Saxe-Weimar-Eisenach – William Ernest

==== Principalities ====
- Schaumburg-Lippe – Adolf II, Prince of Schaumburg-Lippe
- Schwarzburg-Rudolstadt – Günther Victor, Prince of Schwarzburg
- Schwarzburg-Sondershausen – Günther Victor, Prince of Schwarzburg
- Principality of Lippe – Leopold IV, Prince of Lippe
- Reuss Elder Line – Heinrich XXIV, Prince Reuss of Greiz (with Heinrich XXVII, Prince Reuss Younger Line, as regent)
- Reuss Younger Line – Heinrich XXVII, Prince Reuss Younger Line
- Waldeck and Pyrmont – Friedrich, Prince of Waldeck and Pyrmont

==== Duchies ====
- Duke of Anhalt – Frederick II, Duke of Anhalt
- Duke of Brunswick – Ernest Augustus, Duke of Brunswick
- Duke of Saxe-Altenburg – Ernst II, Duke of Saxe-Altenburg
- Duke of Saxe-Coburg and Gotha – Charles Edward, Duke of Saxe-Coburg and Gotha
- Duke of Saxe-Meiningen – Bernhard III, Duke of Saxe-Meiningen

==== Colonial Governor ====
- German East Africa (Deutsch-Ostafrika) – Albert Heinrich Schnee, although much of territory under Allied occupation.

== Events ==
- January/February – Turnip Winter
- 19 January – Zimmermann Telegram
- 2 February – Atlantic U-boat Campaign: Germany announces its U-boats will resume unrestricted submarine warfare, rescinding the 'Sussex Pledge'.
- 3 February – The United States severs diplomatic relations with Germany.
- 13 February – Deutsche Forschungsanstalt für Psychiatrie in Munich is officially founded.
- 24 February – Walter Hines Page, United States ambassador to the United Kingdom, is shown the intercepted Zimmermann Telegram, in which Germany offers to give the American Southwest back to Mexico, if Mexico will take sides with Germany when the United States declares war on Germany.
- 13 March – The German Leather Museum in Offenbach am Main is opened by Hugo Eberhardt.
- 2 April – United States declaration of war on Germany (1917)
- 1 October – The Kaiser-Wilhelm-Institut für Physik is officially founded in Berlin.
- 25 October – Hertling cabinet
- 18 December – German filmcompany UFA GmbH is founded in Berlin.
- 22 December – Deutsches Institut für Normung is founded.

=== Undated ===
- German company Viessmann is founded.
- German company Leoni AG is founded.

== Births ==
- 5 January – Wieland Wagner, German opera director (died 1966)
- 22 January – Casimir Johannes Prinz zu Sayn-Wittgenstein-Berleburg, German politician. (died 2010)
- 18 February – Gertraud Winkelvoss, German neo-Nazi politician (died 1981)
- 24 March – Krafft Arnold Ehricke, German rocket-propulsion engineer and advocate for space colonization (died 1984)
- 9 April – Johannes Bobrowski, German poet and writer (died 1965)
- 16 May – Ulrich Matschoss, German actor (died 2013)
- 2 June – Heinz Sielmann, German zoologist, biologist and filmmaker (died 2006)
- 29 July – Rochus Misch, German bodyguard of Adolf Hitler (died 2013)
- 6 September – Philipp von Boeselager, German resistance fighter (died 2008)
- 12 September – Jürgen Seydel, German karateka (died 2008)
- 15 December
  - Karl-Günther von Hase, German diplomat and journalist (died 2021)
  - Hilde Zadek, German operatic soprano (died 2019)
- 21 December – Heinrich Böll, German writer (died 1985)
- 23 December – Armin Zimmermann, German admiral (died 1976)

== Deaths ==
- 23 January – Jesko von Puttkamer, German nobleman and colonial military chief (born 1855)
- 16 February – August Rauber, German anatomist (born 1841)
- 8 March – Ferdinand von Zeppelin, German general and aircraft manufacturer (born 1838)
- 14 March – Princess Louise Margaret of Prussia, Prussian princess (born 1860)
- 17 March – Franz Brentano, German philosopher, psychologist, and priest (born 1838)
- 21 March – Alfred Einhorn, German chemist (born 1856)
- 31 March – Emil von Behring, German physiologist who received the 1901 Nobel Prize in Physiology or Medicine (born 1854)
- 6 April:
  - Hans Berr, soldier turned World War I flying ace (born 1890)
  - Prince Friedrich Karl of Prussia (1893–1917), German Prussian King
- 14 April – Hartmuth Baldamus, German World War I flying ace (born 1891)
- 21 April – Bernd von Arnim, German naval officer (born 1885)
- 24 April – Oscar Blumenthal, German playwright (born 1852)
- 17 June – Karl Zilgas, German football player (born 1882)
- 27 June – Karl Allmenröder, German World War I flying ace (born 1896)
- 27 June - Gustav von Schmoller, German economist (born 1838)
- 3 August - Ferdinand Georg Frobenius, German mathematician (born 1849)
- 13 August – Eduard Buchner, German chemist and zymologist (born 1860)
- 15 August – Gustav Körte, German archaeologist (born 1852)
- 16 August – Wilhelm Morgner, German painter (born 1891)
- 20 August – Adolf von Baeyer, German chemist (born 1835)
- 5 September – Walther Schwieger, German U-boat commander of U-20, which sank the Lusitania (born 1885)
- 15 September – Kurt Wolff, German aviator (born 1895)
- 28 September – Kurt Wissemann, German World War I flying ace (born 1893)
- 25 October:
  - Maximilian Bayer, German founder of Scouting in Germany (born 1872)
  - Hans Olde, German painter (born 1855)
- 15 November – Hans Ritter von Adam, German flying ace in World War I (born 1886)
- 20 November – Ludwig Sütterlin, German graphic artist (born 1865)
