= 1928 in Germany =

- Decades: 1900s; 1910s; 1920s; 1930s; 1940s
- See also: Other events of 1928; History of Germany • Timeline • Years

Events in the year 1928 in Germany.

== Incumbents ==
=== National level ===
- President - Paul von Hindenburg (Non-partisan)
- Chancellor - Wilhelm Marx (Centre) (to 28 June), Hermann Müller (Social Democrats) (from 28 June)

== Events ==
- May - October – Pressa held in Cologne
- 20 May – 1928 German federal election
- 28 June – Socialist Hermann Müller succeeds Wilhelm Marx as chancellor

== Births ==
- 1 January – Gerhard Weinberg, German-American diplomatic and military historian
- 2 January – Prince Karl of Leiningen, (d. 1990)
- 3 January – Klaus Schulze, Olympic rower (d. 2013)
- 14 January – Hans Kornberg, biochemist (d. 2019)
- 16 January – Manfred Schukowski, astronomer (d. 2025)
- 27 January – Hans Modrow, politician (d. 2023)
- 31 January - Michael Degen, actor (d. 2022)
- 16 February – Edzard Reuter, businessman (d. 2024)
- 20 February – Friedrich Wetter, Cardinal Archbishop of Munich
- 23 February – Hans Herrmann, German racing driver
- 3 March – Gudrun Pausewang, author (d. 2020)
- 12 March – Werner Krolikowski, East German politician
- 16 March – Christa Ludwig, mezzo-soprano (d. 2021)
- 6 April – Paul-Werner Scheele, German Roman Catholic prelate (d. 2019)
- 8 April
  - Willi Brokmeier, German operatic tenor (d. 2024)
  - Leah Rabin, German-born wife of former Prime Minister of Israel Yitzhak Rabin (d. 2000)
- 12 April – Hardy Krüger, German actor (d. 2022)
- 15 April – Paul Butzer, German mathematician (d. 2026)
- 18 April – Karl Josef Becker, German cardinal (d. 2015)
- 29 April – Heinz Wolff, German-born British scientist and broadcaster (d. 2017)
- 9 May – Peter Merseburger, German journalist and author (d. 2022)
- 4 June – Ruth Westheimer, German-born American sex therapist (d. 2024)
- 21 June – Wolfgang Haken, German mathematician (d. 2022)
- 23 June – Klaus von Dohnányi, German politician
- 24 June – Wolfgang Altenburg, German general
- 1 July – Gunnar Möller, German TV and film actor (d. 2017)
- 9 July – Edmund Kalau, German aviator and missionary (d. 2014)
- 15 July – Nicholas Rescher, German-American philosopher (d. 2024)
- 28 July – Norbert Lohfink, German priest and theologian (d. 2024)
- 5 August – Albrecht Dold, German mathematician (d. 2011)
- 9 August – Gerd Ruge, German journalist (d. 2021)
- 15 August – Carl Joachim Classen, German classical scholar (d. 2013)
- 25 August – Herbert Kroemer, German physicist
- 8 November – Ursula Haverbeck, neo-Nazi activist
- 9 November – Werner Veigel, German journalist and television presenter (d. 1995)
- 12 November
  - Hanna Elisabeth "Hanneli" Goslar, German-born Israeli nurse and friend of diarist Anne Frank (d. 2022)
  - Werner Klumpp, politician (died 2021)

== Deaths ==
- 16 January – Bernhard III, Duke of Saxe-Meiningen (born 1851)
- 8 February – Theodor Curtius, German chemist (born 1857)
- 27 February
  - Karl Max, Prince Lichnowsky, German diplomat, noble (born 1860)
  - Jürgen Kröger, German architect (born 1856)
- 19 May – Max Scheler, German philosopher (born 1874)
- 30 August - Wilhelm Wien, German physicist Nobel Prize laureate (born 1864)
- 21 November – Heinrich XXVII, Prince Reuss Younger Line, German prince (born 1858)
- 26 November – Reinhard Scheer, German admiral (born 1863)
