= 1935 in Germany =

- Decades: 1910s; 1920s; 1930s; 1940s; 1950s
- See also: Other events of 1935; History of Germany • Timeline • Years

Events in the year 1935 in Germany.

== Incumbents ==
=== National level ===
Head of State and Chancellor

- Adolf Hitler (the Führer) (Nazi Party)

== Events ==
- 13 January — A plebiscite in the Territory of the Saar Basin shows that 90.3% of those voting wish to join Germany.
- 15 February — The discovery and clinical development of Prontosil, the first broadly effective antibacterial drug, is published in a series of articles in Germany's pre-eminent medical journal, Deutsche Medizinische Wochenschrift, by Gerhard Domagk.
- 1 March — Following the referendum on 13 January, Germany retakes the Saar region from League of Nations control.
- 11 March — The German Air force, the Luftwaffe, is officially created in a proclamation by Hermann Göring
- 16 March — Adolf Hitler announces German rearmament in violation of the Treaty of Versailles.
- 22 March — The first Television program is broadcast from the Funkturm in Berlin by Fernsehsender Paul Nipkow (TV Station Paul Nipkow)
- 28 April — Hitler orders 12 submarines, in defiance of the Treaty of Versailles.
- 21 May — The "Defense Law" (Wehrgesetz) is issued and bans Jews from the armed forces by stipulating that only “Aryans” could serve; it also formalizes the introduction of the general compulsory military service for “Aryans” from 1 October 1935.
- 18 June — Anglo-German Naval Agreement: the United Kingdom agrees to a German navy equal to 35% of her own naval tonnage.
- 10–16 September — The 7th Nazi Party Congress is held in Nuremberg, and is called the "Rally of Freedom" (Reichsparteitag der Freiheit) in reference to the reintroduction of compulsory military service and German "liberation" from the Treaty of Versailles.
- 15 September — The Nuremberg Laws go into effect in Germany. Following an incident of vandalism on the SS Bremen in New York City, the Nazi Party flag emblazoned with the swastika is made the German National Flag on Hitler's orders.
- 10 October — A tornado destroys the 160-metre-tall (520 ft) wooden radio tower in Langenberg, Germany. As a result, wooden radio towers are phased out.
- 12 December — Lebensborn Project, a Nazi reproduction program, is founded by Heinrich Himmler.

== Births ==
- 4 January — Walter Mahlendorf, German sprinter
- 16 January — Udo Lattek, German football player, coach, and TV pundit (died 2015)
- 28 January – Helga Kleiner, German politician
- 30 January — Wolfgang Boettcher, German cellist (died 2021)
- 10 February — Ezard Haußmann, German actor (died 2010)
- 12 February
  - Fritz W. Scharpf, German political scientist
  - Manfred Weiss, German composer (died 2023)
- 15 February — George Alexander Albrecht, German composer and conductor (died 2021)
- 27 February — Theodor Hoffmann, German admiral and politician (died 2018)
- 10 March — Manfred Germar, German athlete
- 13 March — Hilmar Kopper, German banker (died 2021)
- 17 March — Hans Wollschläger, German writer (died 2007)
- 23 March — Hans Lenk, German rower (died 2024)
- 31 March — Rolf Becker, German actor (died 2025)
- 16 April — Sarah Kirsch, German poet (died 2013)
- 17 May — Ryke Geerd Hamer, German cancer researcher (died 2017)
- 1 June — Percy Adlon, German director, screenwriter and producer (died 2024)
- 2 June — Wilhelm Wieben, German journalist (died 2019)
- 3 June — Michael Hampe, German theatre and opera director (died 2022)
- 12 June — Christoph Meckel, German poet (died 2020)
- 23 June — Günter Lörke, German cyclist
- 7 July — Hans Belting, German art historian (died 2023)
- 11 July — Günther von Lojewski, German journalist (died 2023)
- 12 July — Hans Tilkowski, German footballer (died 2020)
- 29 July — Peter Schreier, German tenor (died 2019)
- 5 August — Michael Ballhaus, German cinematographer (died 2017)
- 21 August — Bernhard Eckstein, German cyclist (died 2017)
- 5 September — Dieter Hallervorden, German comedian
- 8 September — Helga M. Novak, German writer (died 2013)
- 2 October — Gisela Stein, German actress (died 2009)
- 4 October — Horst Janson, German actor (died 2025)
- 10 October — Hermann Nuber, German footballer (died 2022)
- 27 November — Helmut Lachenmann, German composer
- 30 November - Paul Gratzik, German poet and novelist (died 2018)
- 8 December - Hans-Jürgen Syberberg, German film director
- 11 December — Ferdinand Alexander Porsche, German car designer (died 2012)
- 18 December – Else Baker, Romani Holocaust survivor
- 30 December — Wolfgang Dauner, German Jazz fusion pianist, composer and keyboardist (died 2020)

== Deaths ==
- January 11 - Gottlieb von Jagow, German diplomat (born 1863)
- January 21 – Adolf von Brauchitsch, German general (born 1876)
- February 3 - Hugo Junkers, German engineer and aircraft designer (born 1859)
- February 8 - Max Liebermann, German painter (born 1847)
- February 18 - Benita von Falkenhayn, German baroness, spy for the Second Polish Republic (born 1900)
- April 14 - Emmy Noether, German mathematician (born 1882)
- April 19 - Albert Tafel, German geographer, doctor and explorer (born 1876)
- 24 April – Paul Klengel, German violinist, conductor and composer (born 1854)
- 10 May - Wilhelm Kolle, German bacteriologist (born 1868)
- 14 May – Magnus Hirschfeld, German sex researcher and gay rights advocate (born 1868)
- 5 June - Alexander von Linsingen, German general (born 1850)
- 12 August - Friedrich Schottky, German mathematician (born 1851)
- 27 August – Otto Schott, German chemist (born 1851)
- 28 September – Hans Baluschek, German painter (born 1870)
- 4 October – Marie Gutheil-Schoder, German operatic soprano (born 1874)
- 8 October – Hans Tropsch, German chemist (born 1889)
- 21 November – Agnes Pockels, German chemist (b. 1862)
- 21 December – Kurt Tucholsky, German-journalist, satirist and writer (born 1890)
