= 1923 in Germany =

- Decades: 1900s; 1910s; 1920s; 1930s; 1940s
- See also: Other events of 1923; History of Germany; Timeline; Years

Events in the year 1923 in Germany.

== Incumbents ==
=== National level ===
- President - Friedrich Ebert (Social Democrats)
- Chancellor - Wilhelm Cuno (Non-partisan) (to 12 August), Gustav Stresemann (German People's Party) (to 30 November), Wilhelm Marx (Centre) (from 30 November)

== Events ==
- 11 January – French and Belgian troops enter the Ruhr in the Occupation of the Ruhr after Germany was declared in default on its World War I reparations obligations. It responded with a government-sponsored policy of passive resistance that spurred on Germany's already high inflation.
- 20 April – Julius Streicher's antisemitic newspaper Der Stürmer begins publication.
- 13 August – The First Stresemann cabinet was sworn in.
- 15 September – Germany's bank rate is raised to 90% due to hyperinflation. See 1920s German inflation.
- 26 September:
  - Chancellor Gustav Stresemann calls for an end to passive resistance and protests by Germans against the French and Belgian Occupation of the Ruhr.
  - The German government declares a state of emergency under Article 48 of the German Weimar Constitution. It will last until February 1924.
- October — as part of the German October, German communists scheme to seize power in the Weimar Republic.
- 6 October – The Second Stresemann cabinet was sworn in.
- 21 October – A separatist government is formed in the Rhineland Palatinate and is quickly recognized by the French government.
- 23 October – The communist Hamburg Uprising begins with left-wing extremists' attacks against numerous police stations in Hamburg and the erection of barricades. By the end of 24 October, the uprising was defeated.
- 9 November – In the Beer Hall Putsch, key members of the Nazi Party and their sympathizers, including Adolf Hitler, Hermann Göring and Erich Ludendorff, attempt a coup against the German government. The coup attempt is crushed and fifteen Nazis are killed by the Bavarian Landespolizei. The killed would-be putschists are later designated as the movement's key "blood martyrs". The Blutfahne used during the coup attempt becomes a key artifact of Nazi party mythology.
- 15 November – The value of the German Papiermark falls to 4.2×10^{12} mark to the United States dollar causing the German government to issue the Rentenmark as a replacement for the Papiermark to alleviate the hyperinflation in the Weimar Republic.
- 23 November – Gustav Stresemann resigns as German Chancellor after a vote of no confidence from members of the government.
- 30 November – The First Marx cabinet was sworn in.
- 1 December – Centre Party member Wilhelm Marx forms a new coalition government becoming the new German Chancellor.
- 8 December:
  - Germany signs an economic treaty with the United States.
  - The Reichstag passes an enabling act empowering the government to take all measures it deems necessary and urgent with regard to the state of emergency.

== Popular culture ==
=== Arts and literature ===
- Hermann Oberth publishes Die Rakete zu den Planetenraumen (The Rocket into Interplanetary Space)

=== Art ===
- Max Beckmann made a self-portrait of himself holding a cigarette. The painting is currently housed at the Museum of Modern Art in New York.
- Wassily Kandinsky painted his Composition VIII while he was working at the Bauhaus school of art in Weimar. This completely non-representational work exemplifies his ground-breaking movement toward abstraction.

== Births ==
- 8 January – Joseph Weizenbaum, German computer scientist (died 2008)
- 11 January – Ernst Nolte, German historian (died 2016)
- 16 January – Anton-Günther, Duke of Oldenburg (died 2014)
- 17 January – Horst E. Brandt, German film director (died 2009)
- 19 January
  - Hellmut Lange, German actor (died 2011)
  - Markus Wolf, German head of the Main Directorate for Reconnaissance (died 2006)
- 9 February – Heinz Drache, German actor (died 2002)
- 10 March – Hans Riegel, German entrepreneur (died 2013)
- 15 March – Willy Semmelrogge, German actor (died 1984)
- 25 March – Reimar Lüst, German astrophysicist
- 26 March – Gert Bastian, German politician (died 1992)
- 22 April – Gero Wecker, German film producer (died 1974)
- 23 April – Reinhart Koselleck, German historian (died 2006)
- 23 May – Walter Wolfrum, German World War II Luftwaffe fighter ace (died 2010)
- 26 May – Horst Tappert, German actor (died 2008)
- 27 May – Henry Kissinger, German-born United States presidential advisor (died 2023)
- 2 June – Margot Trooger, German actress (died 1994)
- 9 June – Gerald Götting, German politician (died 2015)
- 10 June – Georg Moser, German bishop of Roman-Catholic Church (died 1988)
- 14 June – Judith Kerr, German-born British writer and illustrator (died 2019)
- 7 August – Liane Berkowitz, German resistance fighter of the Red Orchestra organisation (died 1943)
- 26 August – Wolfgang Sawallisch, German conductor (died 2013)
- 10 September – Uri Avnery, German-born Israeli writer and founder of the Gush Shalom peace movement
- 20 October – Otfried Preußler, German writer (died 2013)
- 21 October – Erna de Vries, German Holocaust survivor (died 2021)
- 22 October – Bert Trautmann, German footballer and goalkeeper (died 2013)
- 4 November – Harry Valérien, German sports journalist (died 2012)
- 5 November – Rudolf Augstein, German journalist (died 2002)
- 12 November – Vicco von Bülow, German comedian, humorist, cartoonist, film director, actor and writer (died 2011)
- 15 November – Rüdiger von Wechmar, German diplomat (died 2007)
- 22 November – Hanna Maron, German-born Israeli actress
- 15 December:
  - Uzi Gal, German-born Israeli gun designer, best remembered as the designer and namesake of the Uzi submachine gun (died 2002)
  - Inge Keller, German actress (died 2017)
- 17 December – Jürgen Ponto, German bankier (died 1977)
- 25 December – Sonia Olschanezky, German-born French Jewish World War II heroine (executed by German) (died 1944

== Deaths ==
- 1 February – Ernst Troeltsch, theologian and philosopher (born 1865)
- 3 February – Siegmund Guenther, German geographer, historian and naturalist (born 1848)
- 6 February – Gerdt von Bassewitz, German playwright and actor (born 1878)
- 10 February – Wilhelm Conrad Röntgen, physicist (born 1845)
- 11 February – Helmuth von Maltzahn, German politician (born 1840)
- 22 February – Princess Marie Elisabeth of Saxe-Meiningen, German composer (born 1853)
- 23 April – Princess Louise of Prussia (born 1838)
- 24 April – William Ernest, Grand Duke of Saxe-Weimar-Eisenach (born 1876)
- 11 March – Karl von Müller, German German Imperial captain (born 1873)
- 3 May – Ernst Hartwig, German astronomer (born 1851)
- 17 May – Duke Paul Frederick of Mecklenburg (born 1852)
- 21 May – Hans Goldschmidt, German chemist (born 1861)
- 5 June – Carl von Horn, German general (born 1847)
- 20 June – Princess Marie of Battenberg, German writer and translator (born 1852 in France)
- 12 July – Ernst Otto Beckmann, German chemist and pharmacist (born 1853)
- 4 September – Paul Friedländer, German chemist (born 1857)
- 29 September – Walther Penck, German geologist and geomorphologist (born 1888)
- 3 November – Carl Harries, German chemist (born 1866)
- 9 November – Theodor von der Pfordten, Nazi paramilitary (born 1873)
- 14 November – Ernest Augustus, Crown Prince of Hanover (born 1845)
- 16 November – Guido Herzfeld, German actor (born 1851)
- 20 November – Rudolf Havenstein, German lawyer and president of the Reichsbank (born 1857)
- 17 December – Paul von Krause, German politician and jurist (born 1852)
