= 1863 in Germany =

- Decades: 1840s; 1850s; 1860s; 1870s; 1880s
- See also: Other events of 1863; History of Germany • Timeline • Years

Events from the year 1863 in Germany.

== Incumbents ==
- King of Bavaria – Maximilian II of Bavaria
- King of Hanover – George V
- King of Prussia – William I
- King of Saxony – John
- King of Württemberg – William I of Württemberg
- Grand Duke of Baden – Frederick I

== Events ==
- January 4 – The New Apostolic Church, a Christian premillennial church, is established in Hamburg.
- January 29 – Established composer Giacomo Meyerbeer presents the young Jacques Offenbach to Augusta of Saxe-Weimar-Eisenach, queen consort of Prussia.
- February 8 – Signing of Alvensleben Convention between Prussia and Russian Empire.
- May 23 – The General German Workers' Association (Allgemeiner Deutscher Arbeiterverein), the first socialist workers party in Germany, is founded in Leipzig by Ferdinand Lassalle.
- August 1 – Friedrich Bayer founds the chemical manufacturing company of Bayer at Barmen for the manufacture of dyestuffs.
- August 27–29 – Astronomische Gesellschaft in Heidelberg is founded, the world's second oldest astronomical society.
- October 18 – Befreiungshalle memorial above Kelheim in Bavaria, designed by Friedrich von Gärtner and completed by Leo von Klenze, is inaugurated.
- October 26–29 – The Grand Duchy of Baden, Kingdom of Bavaria, Kingdom of Hanover, Grand Duchy of Hesse, Kingdom of Prussia and Kingdom of Saxony are among the signatories to the Resolutions of the Geneva International Conference leading to formation of the International Red Cross and the German Red Cross.
- November 18 – King Christian IX of Denmark signs the November Constitution, declaring Schleswig to be part of Denmark, regarded by the German Confederation as a violation of the London Protocol of 1852, leading to the Second Schleswig War of 1864.
- undated
  - Teerfarbenfabrik Meister, Lucius & Co., predecessor of Hoechst AG, founded at Höchst (Frankfurt) for the manufacture of green dye from coal tar.
  - Rubber goods company Metzeler is founded in Munich.
  - Max Schultze advances cell theory with the observation that animal and vegetable protoplasm are identical.

== Births ==
- January 8 – Paul Scheerbart, writer (died 1915)
- January 15 – Wilhelm Marx, lawyer and politician, Chancellor of Germany (died 1946)
- January 18 – Oscar Troplowitz, pharmacist (died 1918)
- February 11 – Cornelius Osten, businessman (died 1936)
- February 21 – Otto Jaekel, paleontologist and geologist (died 1929)
- February 23 – Franz Stuck, painter, sculptor, engraver and architect (died 1928)
- April 3 – Wilhelm Middelschulte, composer (died 1943)
- April 5 – Princess Victoria of Hesse and by Rhine, noblewoman (died 1950)
- May 2 – Erich Bethe, philologist (died 1940)
- May 25
  - Conrad Cichorius, historian and philologist (died 1932)
  - Heinrich Rickert, philosopher (died 1936)
- June 17 – Charles Michael, Duke of Mecklenburg, head of the House of Mecklenburg-Strelitz (died 1913)
- June 21 – Hermann Krukenberg, surgeon (died 1931)
- June 22 – Gottlieb von Jagow, diplomat (died 1935)
- July 4 – Hugo Winckler, archaeologist and historian, uncovers the capital of the Hittite Empire (Hattusa) (died 1913)
- July 12 – Paul Drude, physicist (died 1906)
- August 19 – Adele Sandrock, German-Dutch actress (died 1937)
- September 4 – Alfred Rehder, botanical taxonomist (died 1949)
- September 8 – Mary of the Divine Heart, Roman Catholic nun (died 1899)
- September 13 – Franz von Hipper, admiral (died 1932)
- September 30 – Reinhard Scheer, admiral (died 1928)
- October 3 – Alfred Wohl, chemist (died 1939)
- October 13 – Hugo Bruckmann, publisher (died 1941)
- October 19 – Gustav Frenssen, novelist (died 1945)
- October 29 – Franz Stuhlmann, naturalist, zoologist and African explorer (died 1928)
- November 12
  - Franz Boluminski, colonial administrator (died 1913)
  - Johannes Thienemann, ornithologist and pastor (died 1938)
- November 18 – Richard Dehmel, poet (died 1920)
- December 11 – Georg Bruchmüller, artillery officer (died 1948)

== Deaths ==
- April 4 – Ludwig Emil Grimm, painter (born 1790)
- May 13 – August Hahn, Protestant theologian (born 1792)
- June 5 – Marie Ellenrieder, painter (born 1791)
- July 8 – Christian Friedrich, Baron Stockmar, physician and statesman (born 1787)
- September 20 – Jacob Grimm, folklorist (born 1785)
- December 13 – Christian Friedrich Hebbel, poet and dramatist (born 1813)
