= 1661 in Germany =

- Decades
- See also: Other events of 1661; History of Germany • Timeline • Years

Events from the year 1661 in Germany.

== Births ==
- Margravine Dorothea Charlotte of Brandenburg-Ansbach
- Christian Heinrich, Margrave of Brandenburg-Bayreuth-Kulmbach
- Christian Wernicke
- Georg Böhm
- Ignaz Agricola
- Johannes Moller

== Deaths ==
- Gottfried Scheidt
- Johann Hülsemann
- Christoph Bach
- Johannes Pharamund Rhumelius
- Johann Cothmann
- August Buchner
- Theophil Großgebauer
