= 1936 in Germany =

- Decades: 1910s; 1920s; 1930s; 1940s; 1950s
- See also: Other events of 1936; History of Germany • Timeline • Years

Events in the year 1936 in Germany.

== Incumbents ==
=== National level ===
Head of State and Chancellor

- Adolf Hitler (the Führer) (Nazi Party)

== Events ==
- 6 February — The IV Olympic Winter Games open in Garmisch-Partenkirchen, Germany.
- 7 March — In violation of the Treaty of Versailles, Germany reoccupies the Rhineland.
- 29 March — German election and referendum, 1936
- 26 June — Focke-Wulf Fw 61, the first practical, functional helicopter, first flown.
- 1 August — The 1936 Summer Olympics open in Berlin, Germany, at the end of the first ever Olympic torch relay. It is also the first occasion in world history when a sporting event is given television coverage.
- The first German volunteers on the nationalist side of the Spanish civil war leave for Spain.
- 30 August — Ernest Nash flees Germany for Rome.
- 8–14 September — The 8th Nazi Party Congress is held and called the "Rally of Honour" (Reichsparteitag der Ehre) in reference to the remilitarization of the Rhineland in March.
- 25 November — The Anti-Comintern Pact is signed by Germany and Japan.
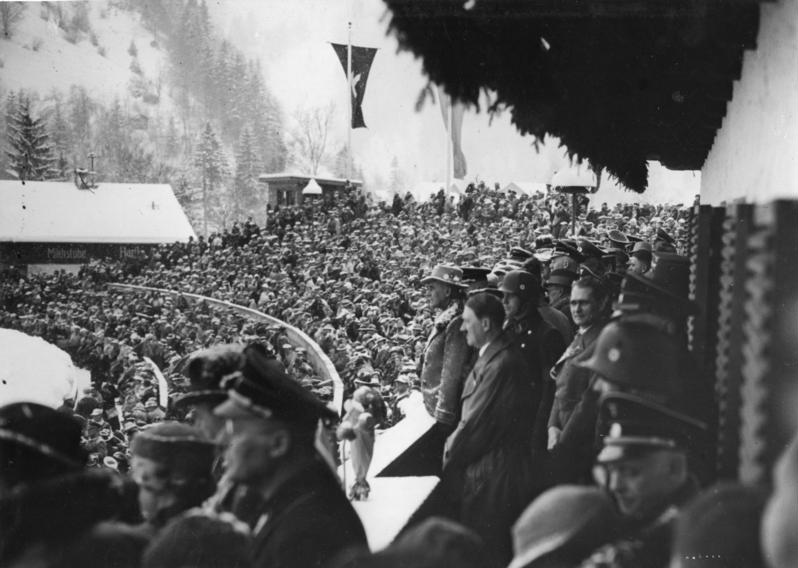
6 February: The IV Olympic Winter Games open in Garmisch-Partenkirchen, Germany.

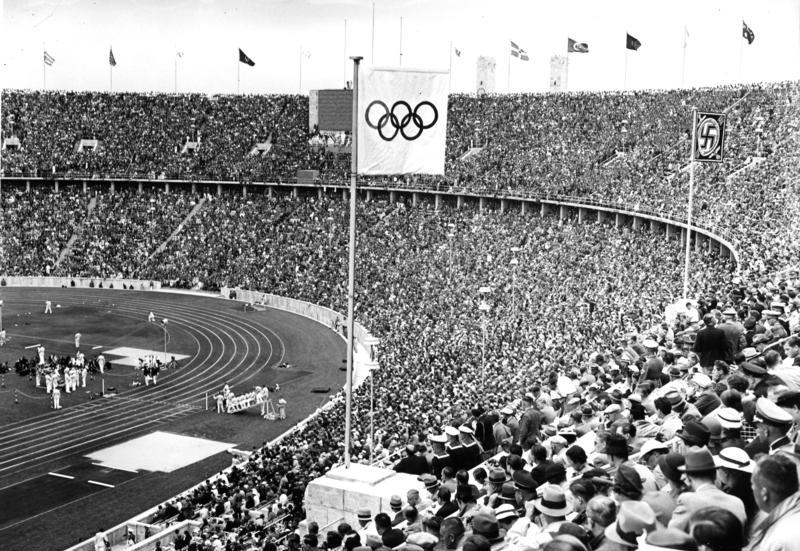
The 1936 Summer Olympics open in Berlin, August 1936

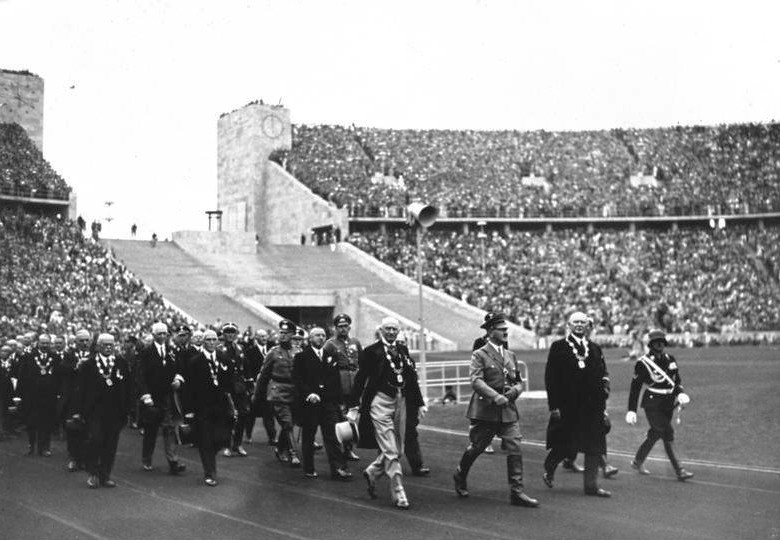
Hitler and the Olympic Committee, 1 August 1936

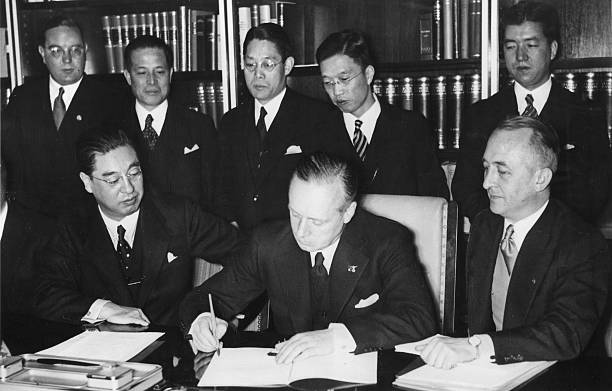
German envoy von Ribbentrop signing the Anti-Comintern Pact

== Births ==
- 10 January — Walter Bodmer, German-English geneticist and academic
- 14 January — Reiner Klimke, German equestrian (died 1999)
- 23 January — Horst Mahler, German lawyer and political activist (died 2025)
- 27 January — Wolfgang Böhmer, German politician (died 2025)
- 9 February — Georg Sterzinsky, German cardinal (died 2011)
- 4 March — Aribert Reimann, German composer (died 2024)
- 9 March — Wittekind, Prince of Waldeck and Pyrmont, head of house of Waldeck and Pyrmont (died 2024)
- 11 March — Harald zur Hausen, German virologist (died 2023)
- 13 March — Lothar Ahrendt, German politician
- 16 March — Elisabeth Volkmann, German actress (died 2006)
- 30 March — Erwin J. Haeberle, German physician (died 2021)
- 6 April — Manfred Schoof, German jazz trumpeter
- 8 April — Klaus Löwitsch, German actor (died 2002)
- 13 April – Dieter Klöcker, German clarinetist (died 2011)
- 19 April – Bernhard Klee, German conductor and pianist (died 2025)
- 22 April — Dieter Kronzucker, German journalist
- 9 May — Ulrich Kienzle, German journalist (died 2020)
- 12 May — Klaus Doldinger, German saxophonist (died 2025)
- 16 May
  - Karl Lehmann, German Roman Catholic Cardinal prelate, Bishop of Mainz (died 2018)
  - Manfred Stolpe, German politician (died 2019)
- 21 May — Günter Blobel, German biologist (died 2018)
- 26 May — Franz Magnis-Suseno, German-born Indonesian Jesuit priest
- 29 May
  - Wyn Hoop, German singer
  - Klaus Winter, German judge (died 2000)
- 1 June — Peter Sodann, German actor (died 2024)
- 9 June — Jürgen Schmude, German politician (died 2025)
- 10 June — Thomas Hoepker, German photographer (died 2024 in Chile)
- 14 June — Wolfgang Behrendt, German boxer
- 21 June — Hans Köhler, German swimmer
- 22 July — Klaus Bresser, German journalist and television presenter
- 25 June — Bert Hölldobler, German sociobiologist and evolutionary biologist
- 28 June — Walter Köstner, German fencer
- 1 July — Lea Rosh, German television journalist, publicist, entrepreneur and political activist
- 2 July — Rex Gildo, German singer (died 1999)
- 7 July — Egbert Brieskorn, German mathematician (died 2013)
- 22 July — Klaus Bresser, German journalist
- 1 August — Carl, Duke of Württemberg, German nobleman (died 2022)
- 5 August — Hans Hugo Klein, German judge
- 12 August — Hans Haacke, German-born American conceptual artist
- 20 August — Kessler Twins, German singers (died 2025)
- 29 September — Hans D. Ochs, German immunologist
- 1 October — Lea Rosh, German television journalist
- 5 October — Annerose Schmidt, German pianist (died 2022)
- 10 October — Gerhard Ertl, German physicist
- 12 October — Inge Brück, German singer (died 2025)
- 13 October — Hans Joachim Meyer, German linguist and politician (died 2024)
- 5 November — Uwe Seeler, German footballer (died 2022)
- 15 November — Wolf Biermann, German singer and songwriter
- 2 December — Peter Duesberg, German molecular biologist (died 2026)
- 3 December — Lothar Gall, German historian (died 2024)
- 8 December — Helmut Markwort, German journalist and magazine founder
- 17 December — Klaus Kinkel, German politician (died 2019)

== Deaths ==
- 16 January - Oskar Barnack, German inventor and German photographer (born 1879)
- 6 February - Wilhelm Solf, German diplomat (born 1862)
- 20 February — Max Schreck, German actor (born 1879)
- 9 April - Ferdinand Tönnies, German sociologist (born 1855)
- 18 April - Richard Lipinski, German politician (born 1867)
- 1 May – Ernst Reicher, German actor (born 1885)
- 4 May - Ludwig von Falkenhausen, German general (born 1844)
- 8 May - Oswald Spengler, German historian (born 1880)
- 22 May - Joseph Koeth, German politician (born 1870)
- 3 June – Walther Wever, German general, pre-World War II Luftwaffe commander (born 1887)
- 22 June –Moritz Schlick, German philosopher and physicist (born 1882)
- 24 July - Georg Michaelis, German politician, former chancellor of Germany (born 1857)
- 20 August - Heinrich Cunow, German politician (born 1862)
- 1 September - Konstantin Schmidt von Knobelsdorf, German general (born 1860)
- 7 September — Erich Büttner, German painter (born 1889)
- 9 October — Friedrich von Oppeln-Bronikowski, German writer (born 1873)
- 19 December - Theodor Wiegand, German archaeologist (born 1864)
- 27 December Hans von Seeckt, German chief of staff (born 1866)
