= 1922 in Germany =

- Decades: 1900s; 1910s; 1920s; 1930s; 1940s
- See also: Other events of 1922; History of Germany • Timeline • Years

Events in the year 1922 in Germany.

== Incumbents ==
=== National level ===
- President - Friedrich Ebert (Social Democrats)
- Chancellor - Joseph Wirth (Centre) (to 22 November), Wilhelm Cuno (Non-partisan) (from 22 November)

== Overview ==
Issues of disarmament and the trial of war criminals had previously been similar sources of anxiety and unrest in Germany, but now receded into the background. In their place was the issue of reparations, which dominated the life of Germans in 1922. Although these social questions remained in the public consciousness, Germans focused most heavily on the economics of how Germany would meet the reparation obligations stipulated by the Treaty of Versailles.

== Reparation battles ==
=== Revisions and requests ===
On 21 March the Reparations Commission answered by fixing the obligations of Germany at the figures proposed by the German government, but with certain conditions which would have to be carried out by 31 May, including requiring a new taxation scheme of 60 billion marks. A number of measures for securing strict control over German finances and the German budget were required to be introduced at early dates, and the scheme for an internal loan submitted by 30 April.

By 248 votes to 81, with 43 abstentions, the Reichstag on 30 March passed a resolution protesting the new regulations, which many believed would cause the rapid depreciation of German money.

=== The World Economic Congressional meeting in Genoa ===
Meanwhile, the great World Economic Congress met in Genoa—the one positive result of the Cannes conference. The congress lost much of its significance for Germany as France had consented to take part in it only on condition that reparations were not officially raised. Nevertheless, the German government regarded the congress as a moral victory. Yet very little actual progress was made.

=== Recognition of Soviet Russia ===
The German delegation became the object of unwelcome attention when it concluded a political and economic agreement with the Russian foreign minister Georgi Chicherin in Rapallo on Easter Sunday (16 April). The agreement had been drawn up in Berlin, but laid aside before being finally adopted. This agreement finally established peace between the two countries, waived all claims arising from the war on both sides and restored diplomatic relations. Thus, the Bolshevist government was accorded open recognition. The former Russian ambassador's palace in Berlin, after being empty for years, had already been handed over. This step added some difficulty to the negotiations of the Great Powers with the Moscow government due to the open hostility that many of the European democracies displayed against the Communist regime.

German delegates' assurances that no disloyalty had been intended by these agreements were rejected with scorn. German delegates futilely asserted that they had reliable information that the other powers were about to conclude arrangements with Russia which would put Germany in a tight corner if she did not act quickly. The French delegation showed itself particularly indignant, as did the British.

=== Negotiating an international loan ===
Of more consequence to Germany was the approach of 31 May, with the threat of dire consequences if the obligations fixed by the Reparations Commission were not carried out. New French Prime Minister Raymond Poincaré had already set forth the programme of pledges and sanctions with which he meant to overcome the alleged "bad will" of Germany. Accordingly, the German finance minister, Andreas Hermes, went to Paris. As a result of his discussions with the Reparations Commission, the government was able to make a proposal that was accepted. The government promised to keep its finances in order so that it could pay the reparations, even if it meant raising taxes. The Reparations Commission consented.

=== Loan renegotiation ===
At the beginning of November the Reparations Commission went to Berlin in the hope of there finding a way out of the impasse. At the same time, a conference was held in Berlin of economic and financial authorities who had been asked to give reasoned opinions on the possibility of stabilizing the mark. Both conferences ended without positive result. The Reparations Commission failed to find the concrete proposals that it had looked for.

On 13 November the Wirth government made definite proposals regarding stabilization and reparations in a note to the Reparations Commission. These proposals were: to fix the German reparation obligations definitely at a tolerable figure, to release Germany for three to four years from all payments in cash and kind, to summon an immediate conference of international financiers to consider the granting of a bank credit to Germany, and, finally, to support Germany's demand for complete equality of treatment in trade and commerce.

== Politics ==
=== Assassination and instability ===
The most serious event of the year internally occurred on the morning of 24 June, when Walther Rathenau was shot dead by assassins in front of his house. Walther Rathenau was the minister for foreign affairs. This event spurred another economic downturn for the Weimar Republic. Four days before the assassination, the Mark was still at one sixty-seventh of its par value. On 27 June, just one week later, it had sunk to one-eightieth of par, on 3 July to one hundred-and-fourteenth, and on 1 August to one hundred-and-fiftieth.

Owing to this new development, the German government on 12 July made a fresh application for postponement of the payments that had been fixed for 1922, and for a simultaneous reduction of the monthly payments for the clearing of private prewar claims from £2,000,000 to £500,000. The Reparations Commission promised to reply, if possible, by 15 August. But France returned an abrupt negative to the request for a reduction of the clearing payments, and even threatened reprisals if Germany did not carry out its clearing obligations by 5 August. Eventually, an agreement was reached, and Germany was allowed to stop cash payments for the rest of 1922 via a conference of the Allies, which commenced on 7 August.

=== Inflation and repercussions ===
Despite the ending of cash payments for the rest of 1922, the main cause of Germany's inability to pay, the steady depreciation of the mark, was ongoing. Towards the end of the year it assumed a disastrous rapidity. On 1 August the US Dollar still stood at 643 Marks to the Dollar and the British Pound at 2,850 Marks to the Pound. But on 5 September the dollar had already risen to 1,440 Marks and the pound to 6,525 Marks, and in December the pound was worth between 30,000 and 40,000 marks and the dollar between 7,000 and 9,000.

In such circumstances it was impossible to exercise proper supervision over the national finances. The budget submitted at the beginning of the year had provided for an ordinary revenue and expenditure of 103,208,000,000 Marks. With the mark at one forty-fifth of its par value, the cost of carrying out the terms of the peace treaty was now 187,531,000,000 marks. Of this sum 16,500,000,000 were provided by the ordinary budget; the other 171,000,000,000 would have had to be raised by a loan. As soon as the mark fell to a sixtieth of par the deficit became 210,000,000,000 instead of 171,000,000,000; and it swelled to fantastic dimensions with the further depreciation of the mark which followed. The floating debt had risen from 247,000,000,000 at the beginning of the year to 272,000,000,000 by 31 March, then to 962,000,000,000 and to 1,494,000,000,000 by the end of the year.

The government sought to prevent the further fall of the mark by a regulation forbidding dealing in foreign currencies. The measure, however, was not well conceived and proved wholly ineffective; it met with sharp opposition, and soon had to be altered.

=== Cuno takes over as Chancellor ===
Late in 1922, the Wirth cabinet found itself compelled to resign owing to party dissensions. In order to secure a broader basis for his government in the critical situation which faced the republic, Dr. Wirth had sought to gain the adherence of the German People's Party, which represented the property-owning classes. Previously, the moderate socialist party had reunited with the Independent Social Democrats who had seceded during the war, while as a kind of counterpoise the bourgeois parties in the government coalition had formed a "working agreement" in the Reichstag with the German People's Party. The united Social Democrats objected to the entry of the German People's Party into the government coalition. Having made this a question of confidence, Dr. Wirth felt himself compelled to resign.

The president entrusted the formation of a new cabinet to Dr. Wilhelm Cuno, manager of the Hamburg-America Line, who accomplished the task with some difficulty. As the Social Democrats refused to join, Dr. Cuno formed a so-called business ministry, which usually is composed of non-politicians. In this case, however, it was largely composed of deputies of the bourgeois coalition in addition to Cuno, who did not belong to any party and in fact was not a member of the Reichstag when he first took over. These parties did not form a majority in the House by themselves. Consequently, the cabinet depended on the good will either of the Social Democrats or the German Nationalists.

Cuno's cabinet was as follows:

- Wilhelm Cuno – Chancellor
- Frederic Hans von Rosenberg - Foreign Minister
- Rudolf Oeser (German Democratic Party (DDP)) – Interior Minister
- Andreas Hermes (German Centre Party (Z)) – Finance Minister
- Johannes Becker (German People's Party (DVP)) – Economics Minister
- Heinrich Brauns (Z) – Labour Minister
- Rudolf Heinze (DVP) – Justice Minister
- Otto Gessler (DDP) – Defence Minister
- Karl Stingl (Bavarian Centre Party (BVP)) – Postal Minister
- Wilhelm Groener – Transport Minister
- Hans Luther – Food Minister
- Heinrich Albert – Treasury Minister of Germany and Reconstruction Minister of Germany

The new government continued the reparations policy of its predecessor. When a conference of the Allies met in London to consider the German request for a postponement of payment, the new government made fresh proposals on matters of detail regarding the periods and the application of the loans it had in view. The conference rejected the proposals as inadequate. The London negotiations brought no solution of the reparations question. Poincaré's plans for the seizing of "productive pledges" and the occupation of the Ruhr valley met with the opposition of the other powers, while Poincaré on his side was not to be moved from his designs, which were of a military and political rather than economic character, by any offers of United Kingdom for a mutual cancellation of debts. Thus the year ended with a situation full of ominous uncertainty.

=== Internal unrest ===
The internal position of the republic was somewhat weakened by unrest arising from economic fragility, which resulted from uncertainty concerning the war debts and its adverse effect on the economy. In February, a strike engineered by the more reckless elements of labor among the railway employees paralyzed traffic for six days in North Germany and a part of Baden. It then collapsed, and was followed by disciplinary action against some of the instigators and also those participators in the strike who had been guilty of acts of violence and sabotage. The government, supported by public opinion, held that state employees had no right to strike, and received a vote of confidence on this point in the Reichstag. A frivolous strike of the Berlin municipal workers, which left the capital without light, water, and electricity, ended after three days with an unconditional resumption of work. Food disturbances broke out at some places in the summer, but they were easily suppressed.

More disturbing to the peace of the republic were the subterraneous movements which were forming in anti-republican circles. The preceding year had been marked by the murder of Matthias Erzberger. This year was marked by the aforementioned murder of Walther Rathenau, an attempt to poison Philipp Scheidemann, the lord mayor of Kassel, with prussic acid on Whit Monday, and the stabbing of journalist Maximilian Harden on 3 July. The feeling aroused found vent in great demonstrations on the part of the republican section of the population, especially among the working classes. In certain places, e.g., Zwickau, near Magdeburg, Freiburg, Darmstadt, etc., violent exhibitions of popular resentment erupted, at times accompanied by bloodshed.

=== Political repercussions ===
The republican authorities acted with great energy and proclaimed relentless warfare against the "Right". An order (invoking Article 48 of the Weimar Constitution) was issued investing the government with extraordinary powers to cope with the emergency. A few days later it was withdrawn in favour of a bill for the protection of the republic, increasing the penalties for attacks on republican institutions and officials, establishing a special State Court alongside the German High Court for trying such cases, and banning societies, meetings, and printed matter that opposed "the constitutionally established republican form of government". It was followed by an amnesty bill, a crimes bill, and a supplement to the officials law. The Reichstag passed the Law for the Protection of the Republic after a long discussion by 303 votes to 102. The other bills were also passed by large majorities. Only the German Nationalists, the Bavarian People's Party, the Communists, and certain members of the German People's Party voted against them.

=== Politically motivated trials ===
In response to the Law for the Protection of the Republic, a number of organizations which espoused anti-republican sentiment were dissolved, including the Organisation Consul, which was responsible for the assassinations of Matthias Erzberger on 26 August 1921 and Walther Rathenau on 24 June 1922. In the trial of ex-Captain Manfred von Killinger in May for abetting the murder of Erzberger, the two assassins to whom Killinger had given the orders escaped and Killinger was acquitted, although his connection with the murderers of Erzberger was not in doubt. The murderers of Rathenau, the engineer Hermann Fischer and Naval Lieutenant (retired) Erwin Kern, had escaped arrest and condemnation by suicide. A number of persons who were accused partly of complicity, partly of abetting or assisting, were brought before the new court in October. Thirteen were convicted.

A political trial held at Munich was of quite a different character. The author Freiherr Hubert von Leoprechting was on trial for high treason. This man was accused of being in the pay of Dard, the French envoy in Munich, who left the city for good a few days before the trial. It came out in the trial that Dard had acquainted the accused with the plans for separating South from North Germany, and that these plans were, if necessary, to be assisted by an advance of French troops through the Main valley. He was condemned to imprisonment for life and loss of civil rights.

Wolfgang Kapp, the instigator of the notorious Kapp Putsch of March 1920, was going to put to trial, but died before he could put on trial.

== Treaties and the Creation of Poland ==
A number of treaties were concluded with various states, including Switzerland, the United States, Italy, Latvia, and Finland. Most were economic in character, and served to clear away the debris left by the war. The extension of the Russo-German Treaty of Rapallo to the Soviet republics federated with Russia took place as a matter of course, and aroused no attention.

The Second Polish Republic and Germany made good progress towards coming to terms on the question of Upper Silesia. Through the mediation of the Swiss deputy Felix Calonder, the two countries came to an agreement in April. The agreement was designed to last fifteen years, which gave prospect of a lasting settlement. The most difficult questions were those of the protection of minorities, and of German private property liquidation in the portions of Upper Silesia assigned to Poland. Difficulties arose when Poland claimed an unrestricted right of liquidation, and failed to recognize the right of the chairman of the Mixed Commission to arbitrate. A compromise was reached, in which Poland gained a limited right of liquidation, without inflicting too great a hardship on the German owners.

On 17 July the transfer to Poland of the parts of Upper Silesia assigned to her commenced. At the same time, large portions of the population moved from newly-Polish districts into the parts that remained German. A few weeks later, the German districts voted on whether they should become an autonomous federated state, or remain incorporated with Prussia. The result was: 513,126 votes for Prussia, 50,400 for autonomy. It was now possible to hold the elections to the Reichstag (institution) and the Prussian Landtag which had been postponed on account of the occupation. They ended unfavourably for the Poles, who won no seat out of five in the Reichstag, and only one out of eight in the Landtag.

Great dissatisfaction arose in Germany in response to the fate of five villages on the east bank of the Vistula. These villages had formerly belonged to West Prussia, were inhabited almost entirely by Germans, and had voted to remain in Germany in the East Prussian plebiscite. The boundary commission nevertheless assigned them to the Polish Corridor, in spite of protests by the inhabitants, the Reichstag, and the Prussian Landtag. The Prussian premier Otto Braun emphatically stigmatized this decision as a "scandalous breach of the peace of Versailles". The protest was so effective that the execution of the decision was postponed and had not yet been carried out at the end of the year.

== Births ==
- 6 January – Hugo Broch, German pilot
- 14 January – Guy Stern, German-born American intelligence officer and Holocaust historian (died 2023 in the United States)
- 29 January – Gerda Steinhoff, German Nazi war criminal (died 1946)
- 12 February – Gustl Bayrhammer, German actor (died 1993)
- 26 February – Franz Beyer, German musicologist (died 2018)
- 6 March – Wanda Klaff, war criminal (died 1946)
- 7 March – Hans Ephraimson-Abt, German-born American businessperson and advocate for the victims of aviation accidents (died 2013)
- 15 March:
  - Karl-Otto Apel, German philosopher (died 2017)
  - Horst Wendlandt, German film director (died 2002)
- 18 March – Egon Bahr, German politician (died 2015)
- 28 March – Theo Albrecht, German entrepreneur (died 2010)
- 7 April – Lothar Sieber, German test pilot (died 1945)
- 22 April – Angelika Hurwicz, German actress (died 1999)
- 28 April – Barbara Lüdemann, German politician (d. 1992)
- 1 May – Friedrich Wilhelm Christians, German banker (died 2004)
- 12 June – Günter Behnisch, German architect (died 2010)
- 10 July – Ewald-Heinrich von Kleist-Schmenzin, German publisher (died 2013)
- 14 July – Elfriede Rinkel, German SS officer (died 2018)
- 24 July – Hans-Jürgen Wischnewski, German politician (died 2005)
- 30 July – Ulli Beier, German editor, writer and scholar (died 2011)
- 18 August – Fritz Umgelter, German television director and writer and film director (died 1981)
- 9 September – Hans Georg Dehmelt, German physicist (died 2017)
- 14 September – Bally Prell, German singer and folk singer (died 1982)
- 29 September – Karl-Heinz Köpcke, German news speaker (died 1991)
- 8 October – Katharina Focke, German politician (died 2016)
- 19 October – Jürgen Brandt, German general (died 2003)
- 2 November – Ria Baran, German pair skater (died 1986)
- 8 December – Lucian Freud, German painter (died 2011)
- 8 December – Gerhard Löwenthal, German journalist (died 2002)
- 18 December – Klaus Schwarzkopf, German actor (died 1991)

== Deaths ==
- 4 March – Hugo Erfurt, German pharmacist and inventor (born 1834)
- 5 March – Richard Schöne, German archaeologist (born 1840)
- 14 March – Clemens von Podewils-Dürniz, German politician (born 1850)
- 8 April – Erich von Falkenhayn, Chief of the German general staff 1914–16 (born 1861)
- 24 June – Walther Rathenau, German politician (born 1867)
- 30 June – Georg von Vollmar, Bavarian politician (born 1850)
- 28 August – Friedrich Schrader, German philologist (born 1865)
- 18 October – August Gaul, German sculptor (born 1869)
- 25 October – Oscar Hertwig, German zoologist (born 1849)
- 23 November – Eduard Seler, Prussian scholar, Mesoamericanist (born 1849)

== See also ==
- Timeline of German history
