= 1853 in Germany =

- Decades: 1830s; 1840s; 1850s; 1860s; 1870s
- See also: Other events of 1853; History of Germany • Timeline • Years

Events from the year 1853 in Germany.

== Incumbents ==
- King of Bavaria – Maximilian II
- King of Hanover – George V
- King of Prussia – Frederick William IV
- King of Saxony – Frederick Augustus II

== Events ==
- 20 July – The Jade Treaty is signed between Prussia and Oldenburg. Prussia is ceded territory which allows it to construct a major naval base at Wilhelmshaven
- 25 October – Neue Pinakothek in Munich opened.

== Births ==
- 1 January – Karl von Einem, German general, Prussian Minister of War (died 1934)
- 9 January – Henning von Holtzendorff, German admiral (died 1919)
- 10 January – John Martin Schaeberle, German/American astronomer (died 1924)
- 14 March – Max Saenger, German obstetrician and gynecologist (died 1903)
- 4 July – Ernst Otto Beckmann, German chemist (died 1923)
- 12 July - Carl Schotten, German chemist (died 1910)
- 26 July - Martin Segitz, German politician (died 1927)
- 2 September – Wilhelm Ostwald, German chemist (died 1932)
- 20 September – Joseph Kürschner, German editor and publisher (died 1902)
- 23 September – Fritz von Below, German general (died 1918)
- 16 September – Albrecht Kossel, German physician, recipient of the Nobel Prize in Physiology or Medicine (died 1927)
- 22 November – Clemens von Ketteler, German diplomat killed during the Boxer Rebellion (died 1900)

=== Full date unknown ===
- Otto Wissig, Protestant German parson and author (died 1933)

== Deaths ==
- 19 January – Karl Faber, German historian (born 1773)
- 15 February – August, Prince of Hohenlohe-Öhringen, German general (born 1784)
- 28 April – Ludwig Tieck, German writer (born 1773)
- 15 December – Georg Friedrich Grotefend, German epigraphist and philologist (born 1775)
- Undated – Meta Forkel-Liebeskind, German writer and scholar (born 1765)
