= Wissig =

Wissig is a surname. Notable people with the surname include:

- Otto Wissig (1853–1933), German Lutheran clergyman and writer
- Philip Wissig (1848–1921), American hatter, saloon keeper and politician
