= 1854 in Germany =

- Decades: 1830s; 1840s; 1850s; 1860s; 1870s
- See also: Other events of 1854; History of Germany • Timeline • Years

Events from the year 1854 in Germany.

== Incumbents ==
- King of Bavaria – Maximilian II
- King of Hanover – George V
- King of Prussia – Frederick William IV
- King of Saxony – till 9 August Frederick Augustus II and John of Saxony afterwards

== Events ==
- 15 July – The Glaspalast is opened in Munich. A giant glass building modelled on London's Crystal Palace, it houses an industrial exhibition.

=== Undated ===
- Construction finishes on the neoclassical Semper Gallery in Dresden designed by Gottfried Semper
- Karl Wilhelm sets the words of Max Schneckenburger's poem "Die Wacht am Rhein" to music, creating a patriotic anthem.
- Gustav Bläser's sculpture Athena Protects the Young Hero is installed in Berlin

== Births ==
- 17 February – Friedrich Alfred Krupp, German industrialist (died 1902)
- 14 March - Paul Ehrlich, German physician, scientist (died 1915)
- 15 March – Emil von Behring, German physiologist, winner of the 1901 Nobel Prize in Physiology or Medicine (died 1917)
- 18 April – Ludwig Levy, German architect (died 1907)
- 11 May - Ottmar Mergenthaler, German inventor of linotype (died 1899)
- 23 August - Moritz Moszkowski, German/Polish composer and pianist (died 1925)
- 1 September – Engelbert Humperdinck, German composer (died 1921)
- 13 September - Hermann von Stein, German general (died 1927)
- Date unknown
  - Wilhelm Walloth, writer (died 1932)

== Deaths ==
- 1 January - Conrad Hinrich Donner, German banker and art collector (born 1774)
- 25 March - Caroline of Nassau-Saarbrücken, German Countess Palatine of Zweibrücken (born 1704)
- 11 April – Karl Adolph von Basedow, German physician (born 1799)
- 27 April - Hermann Abeken, German political writer (born 1820)
- 18 May - Ernst von Bodelschwingh-Velmede, German statesman and politician (born 1794)
- 13 June – Rosina Regina Ahles, German actor (born 1799)
- 20 June - Caroline of Hesse-Homburg (born 1771)
- 6 July – Georg Ohm, German physicist (born 1789)
- 25 July - Johann Samuel Eduard d'Alton, German anatomist (born 1803)
- 2 August – Heinrich Clauren, German writer (born 1771)
- 9 August - Frederick Augustus II of Saxony, king of Saxony (born 1797)
- 20 August - Friedrich Wilhelm Joseph Schelling, German philosopher (born 1775)
- 18 September - Johann Friedrich Meckel, the Elder, German anatomist (born 1724)
- 26 October – Therese of Saxe-Hildburghausen, queen consort of Bavaria (born 1792)
- 23 November - Gottfried Bernhard Göz, German painter (born 1708)
- 13 December - Andreas Buchner, German historian (born 1776)
