= Zopf (surname) =

Zopf is a German surname. Notable people with the surname include:

- Bill Zopf (born 1948), American basketball player
- Friedrich Wilhelm Zopf (1846–1909), German botanist and mycologist
- Johann Heinrich Zopf (1691–1774), German historian
