= 1938 in Germany =

- Decades: 1910s; 1920s; 1930s; 1940s; 1950s
- See also: Other events of 1938; History of Germany; Timeline; Years

Events in the year 1938 in Germany.

== Incumbents ==
=== National level ===
Head of State and Chancellor

- Adolf Hitler (the Führer) (Nazi Party)

== Events ==
- 12 January — The German War Minister Field Marshal Werner von Blomberg (* 1878) marries Luise Gruhn (* 1913) in Berlin; Hermann Göring is best man at the wedding.
- 27 January — Werner von Blomberg resigns, following the revelation that his new wife had previously posed for pornographic photos
- 4 February — Adolf Hitler abolishes the War Ministry and creates the Oberkommando der Wehrmacht (High Command of the Armed Forces), giving him direct control of the German military. In addition, Hitler sacks political and military leaders considered unsympathetic to his philosophy or policies. General Werner von Fritsch is forced to resign as Commander of Chief of the German Army following accusations of homosexuality, and replaced by General Walther von Brauchitsch. Foreign Minister Baron Konstantin von Neurath is sacked and replaced by Joachim von Ribbentrop.
- 12 February — Chancellor Kurt von Schuschnigg of Austria meets Adolf Hitler at Berchtesgaden and, under threat of invasion, is forced to yield to German demands for greater Nazi participation in the Austrian government.
- 3 March — Sir Nevile Henderson, British Ambassador to Germany, presents a proposal to Hitler for an international consortium to rule much of Africa (in which Germany would be assigned a leading role) in exchange for a German promise never to resort to war to change her frontiers; Hitler rejects the British offer.
- 12 March — Anschluss: German troops occupy Austria, which has a 200,000-strong Jewish population mostly in the capital city Vienna.
- 13 March — Annexation of Austria by Germany is declared.
- 10 April — German election and referendum, 1938
- 5 May — General Ludwig Beck, Chief of the German Army's General Staff, submits a memorandum to Hitler opposing Fall Grün (Case Green), the plan for a war with Czechoslovakia, under the grounds that Germany is ill-prepared for the world war likely to result from such an attack.
- 23 May — Temporarily frustrated by the Czechoslovak mobilization and international diplomatic unity in the face of German demands over the Sudetenland, Hitler orders the Foreign Office to assure the Czechoslovaks that he has no demands on their territory. The world at large mistakenly believes the crisis is averted.
- 28 May — In a conference at the Reichs Chancellery, Hitler declares his decision to destroy Czechoslovakia by military force, and orders the immediate mobilization of 96 Wehrmacht divisions.
- 1 July — The new town of Wolfsburg in Lower Saxony is set up to serve the Volkswagen car factory, where production of the Beetle people's car had begun the previous year.
- 10 August — At a secret summit with his leading generals, Hitler attacks General Beck's arguments against Fall Grün, winning the majority of his senior officers over to his point of view.
- 11 August — The Nuremberg synagogue is destroyed by Nazis.
- 18 August — Colonel General Ludwig Beck, convinced that Hitler's decision to attack Czechoslovakia will lead to a general European war, resigns his position as Chief of the Army General Staff in protest.
- 5-12 September — The 10th Nazi Party Congress is held and named the "Rally of Greater Germany" (Reichsparteitag Großdeutschland) in reference to the Anschluss of Austria.
- 10 September — Hermann Göring, in a speech at Nuremberg, calls the Czechs a "miserable pygmy race" who are "harassing the human race." That same evening, Edvard Beneš, President of Czechoslovakia, makes a broadcast in which he appeals for calm.
- 15 September — Neville Chamberlain arrives in Berchtesgaden to begin negotiations with Hitler over the Sudetenland.
- 17 September — Neville Chamberlain returns temporarily to London to confer with his cabinet.
- 22 September — Neville Chamberlain arrives in the city of Godesberg for another round of talks with Hitler over the Sudetenland crisis. Hitler raises his demands to include occupation of all German Sudeten territories by October 1. That night after a telephone conference, Chamberlain reverses himself and advises the Czechoslovaks to mobilize.
- 24 September — At 1:30 AM, Adolf Hitler and Neville Chamberlain conclude their talks on the Sudetenland. Chamberlain agrees to take Hitler's demands, codified in the Godesberg Memorandum, personally to the Czech Government. The Czech Government rejects the demands, as does Chamberlain's own cabinet. The French Government also initially rejects the terms and orders a partial mobilization of the French army.
- 26 September — In a vitriolic speech at Berlin's Sportpalast, Hitler defies the world and implies war with Czechoslovakia will begin at any time.
- 28 September — As his self-imposed October 1 deadline for occupation of the Sudetenland approaches, Adolf Hitler invites Italian Duce Benito Mussolini, French Premier Edourd Deladier, and British Prime Minister Neville Chamberlain to one last conference in Munich. The Czechs themselves are not invited.
- 29 September — Colonel Graham Christie, former British military attaché in Berlin, is informed by Carl Friedrich Goerdeler that the mobilization of the Royal Navy has badly damaged the popularity of the Nazi regime, as the German public realizes that Fall Grün is likely to cause a world war.
- 29 September — Munich Agreement: German, Italian, British and French leaders agree to German demands regarding annexation of the Sudetenland in Czechoslovakia. The Czechoslovak government is largely excluded from the negotiations and is not a signatory to the agreement.
- 30 September — Neville Chamberlain returns to Britain from meeting with Adolf Hitler and declares "Peace for our time".
- 1 October — German troops march into the Sudetenland. The Polish government gives the Czech government an ultimatum stating that the Trans-Olza region must be handed over within twenty-four hours. The Czechs have little choice but to comply. Polish forces occupy Trans-Olza.
- 16 October — The German government expels 12,000 Polish Jews living in Germany; the Polish government accepts 4,000 and refuses admittance to the remaining 8,000, who are forced to live in the no-man's land on the German-Polish frontier.
- 24 October — At a "friendly luncheon" in Berchtesgaden, German foreign minister Joachim von Ribbentrop tells Józef Lipski, the Polish ambassador to Germany, that the Free City of Danzig must return to Germany, that the Germans must be given extraterritorial rights in the Polish Corridor, and that Poland must sign the Anti-Comintern Pact.
- 28 October — Some 17,000 Polish Jews are arrested by Nazis and deported to Poland, which refuses them entry and leaves them stranded on the border of the two countries.
- 7 November — Ernst vom Rath, the Third Secretary at the German Embassy in Paris, is assassinated by Herschel Grynszpan.
- 9 November — Holocaust – Kristallnacht: In Germany, the "night of broken glass" begins as Nazi activists and sympathizers loot and burn Jewish businesses (the all night affair sees 7,500 Jewish businesses destroyed, 267 synagogues burned, 91 Jews killed, and at least 25,000 Jewish men arrested).
- 12 November — Hitler fines the Jewish community 1 billion marks for the death of Ernst vom Rath.
- 6 December — German Foreign Minister Joachim von Ribbentrop visits Paris, where he is allegedly informed by French Foreign Minister Georges Bonnet that France now recognizes all of Eastern Europe as being in Germany's exclusive sphere of influence. Bonnet's alleged statement (Bonnet always denied making the remark) to Ribbentrop is a major factor in German policy in 1939.
- 17 December — Nuclear fission of heavy elements is discovered by German Otto Hahn and his assistant Fritz Strassmann.

=== Undated ===
- The Walther P38 pistol is introduced in Germany.
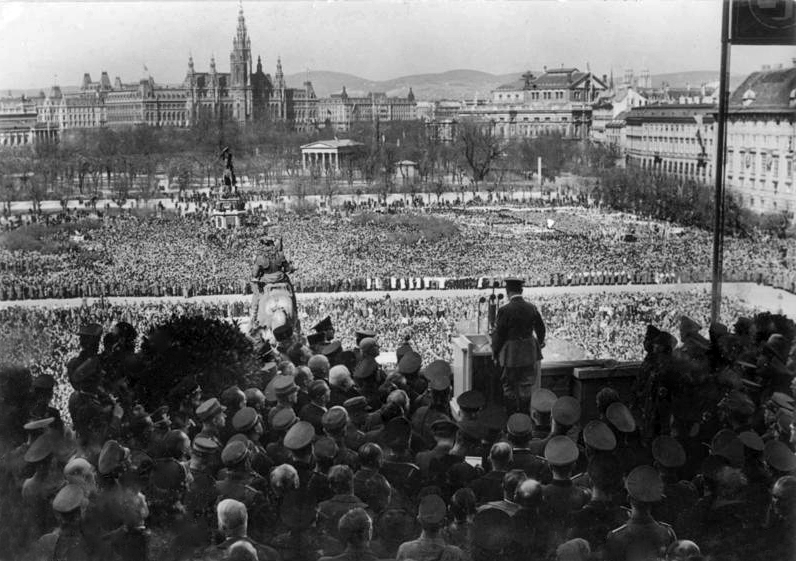
March 15: Hitler announces the Anschluss in Vienna

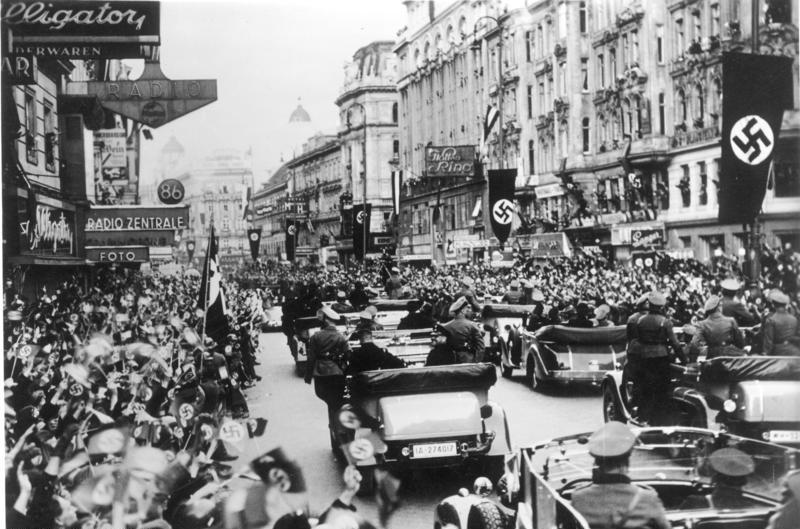
March 15: Vienna crowds cheering the German forces.

== Births ==
- January 7 — Christfried Berger, German evangelical theologian (died 2003)
- January 23 — Georg Baselitz, German painter and sculptor (died 2026 in Austria)
- February 3 - Tony Marshall, German singer (died 2023)
- February 16 - Hans-Dieter Bader, German opera singer (died 2022)
- February 19 - Josef Duchac, German politician
- February 22 — Karin Dor, German actress (died 2017)
- March 4 - F. W. Bernstein, German cartoonist and poet (died 2018)
- March 11 - Christian Wolff, German actor
- March 21 — Fritz Pleitgen, German journalist (died 2022)
- March 25 - Dietrich Stobbe, German politician (died 2011)
- March 30 - Klaus Schwab, German economist, founder of the World Economic Forum
- April 16 - Wolf Hilbertz, German futurist architect, inventor, and marine scientist (died 2007)
- May 13 — Eberhard Schoener, German composer, conductor, arranger and keyboard player
- May 20
  - Rainer Basedow, German actor (died 2022 in Austria)
  - Astrid Kirchherr, German photographer (died 2020)
- May 21 — Helga Paris, German photographer (died 2024)
- May 30 — Hermann Kulke, German historian (died 2026)
- June 5 — Karin Balzer, German athlete (died 2019)
- June 10 - Alexander von Stahl, German lawyer and politician
- July 5 - Vera Oelschlegel, German singer, actress, artistic director, drama director and teacher
- July 7 - Jan Assmann, German egyptologist
- July 10 - Hans Peter Hallwachs, German actor
- July 13 - Michael Verhoeven, German film director
- July 17 - Hartmut Bagger, German general
- July 23 - Götz George, German actor (died 2016)
- July 25 - Günter Lenz, German jazz bassist and composer (died 2026)
- August 9 - Robert Zollitsch, German prelate of Roman Catholic Church
- August 17 - Hubert Markl, German biologist (died 2015)
- August 10 — Grit Boettcher, German actress and comedian
- August 24 - Elmar Altvater, German political scientist (died 2018)
- September 2 - Ursula Lillig, German actress (died 2004)
- September 11 — Peter Iden, German museum director and cultural journalist (died 2026)
- September 23 — Romy Schneider, German actress (died 1982)
- September 28 — Gerd Dudek, German jazz musician (died 2022)
- October 31 - Henning Scherf, German politician
- November 23 — Herbert Achternbusch, German film director and writer (died 2022)
- December 1 — Manfred Schneckenburger, German art historian (died 2019)
- December 3 - Werner Thissen, German bishop of Roman Catholic Church (died 2025)
- December 5 - Klaus Bockisch, German football player (died 2018)
- December 13 — Heino, German singer

== Deaths ==
- 28 January - Bernd Rosemeyer, racing driver. (born 1909)
- 17 February — Bill Drews, German lawyer (born 1870)
- 5 March - Adalbert Seitz, German entomologist(born 1860)
- 27 April - Edmund Husserl, German philosopher (born 1859)
- 4 May - Carl von Ossietzky, German journalist and pacifist (born 1889)
- 15 June — Ernst Ludwig Kirchner, German painter, draftsman, printmaker, sculptor, and writer (born 1880)
- 16 June — Robert Wiene, German filmmaker (born 1873)
- 8 July - Gustav Pauli, German art historian and museum director (born 1866)
- 4 August - Heinrich Held, German politician (born 1868)
- 19 September - Paul Reichard, German explorer (born 1854)
- 24 October — Ernst Barlach, German expressionist sculptor, printmaker and writer (born 1870)
- 24 December - Carl Miele, German businessman (born 1869)
- 25 December - Theodor Fischer, German architect and teacher (born 1862)
