= 1650 in Germany =

- Decades
- See also: Other events of 1650; History of Germany • Timeline • Years

Events from the year 1650 in Germany.

== Events ==
Topographia Bohemiae, Moraviae et Silesiae in Topographia Germaniae is published

== Births ==
- August of Saxe-Weissenfels
- Johann Anton Coberg
- Ernest, Count of Stolberg-Ilsenburg

== Deaths ==
- Sophie Elisabeth of Brandenburg
- Agnes of Hesse-Kassel
- Simon Philip, Count of Lippe
- Heinrich von Schlick
- Bartholomeus Strobel
