= 1850 in Germany =

- Decades: 1830s; 1840s; 1850s; 1860s; 1870s
- See also: Other events of 1850; History of Germany • Timeline • Years

Events from the year 1850 in Germany.

== Incumbents ==
- King of Bavaria – Maximilian II
- King of Hanover – Ernest Augustus
- King of Prussia – Frederick William IV
- King of Saxony – Frederick Augustus II

== Events ==
- 31 January – The Constitution of Prussia is adopted.
- 25 July - Battle of Isted
- 28 August – Richard Wagner's opera Lohengrin premieres in Weimar under the direction of Franz Liszt.
- 24 November - Battle of Lottorf
- 29 November – The Punctation of Olmütz was agreed between the Austrian Empire and Prussia. It granted the Austrians leadership of the revived German Confederation.

== Births ==
- 6 January - Eduard Bernstein, German politician (died 1932)
- 17 February - Georg Theodor August Gaffky, German bacteriologist (died 1918)
- 7 March - Georg von Vollmar, Bavarian politician (died 1922)
- 9 March - Josias von Heeringen, German general (died 1926)
- 18 March - Ernst Büchner, German chemist (died 1924)
- 1 April - Hans von Pechmann, German chemist (died 1902)
- 9 April - Hermann Zumpe, German conductor and composer (died 1903)
- 16 April – Paul von Breitenbach, German railway planner (died 1930)
- 6 June – Karl Ferdinand Braun, winner of the 1909 Nobel Prize in Physics (died 1918)
- 13 June - Max Lenz, German historian (died 1932)
- 12 July - Otto Schoetensack, German anthropologist (died 1912)
- 20 October - Adolf Rosenzweig, German rabbi (died 1918)
- 16 December - Hans Ernst August Buchner, German bacteriologist (died 1902)

== Deaths ==
- 27 January - Johann Gottfried Schadow, German sculptor (born 1764)
- 13 May - Johann Jakob Bernhardi, German physician and botanist (born 1774)
- 21 May – Christoph Friedrich von Ammon, German theological writer, preacher (born 1766)
- 14 July– August Neander, German theologian, church historian (born 1789)
- 22 September – Johann Heinrich von Thünen, German economist (born 1783)
- 4 November – Gustav Schwab, German classical scholar and writer (born 1792)
- 28 December - Heinrich Christian Schumacher, German astronomer (born 1780)
