= 1774 in Germany =

- Decades
- See also: Other events of 1774; History of Germany • Timeline • Years

Events from the year 1774 in Germany.

== Establishments ==
- Philanthropinum

== Births ==
- Ferdinand Oechsle
- Gottfried Daniel Krummacher
- Ferdinand Weerth
- Johann Jakob Bernhardi
- Johann Wilhelm Andreas Pfaff

== Deaths ==
- Johann Heinrich Zopf
- Karl Heinrich von Bogatzky
- Johann Georg Schröpfer
- Christian Wilhelm Ernst Dietrich
- Johann Jakob Reiske
- Susanne von Klettenberg
