= 1614 in Germany =

- Decades
- See also: Other events of 1614; History of Germany • Timeline • Years

Events from the year 1614 in Germany.

== Births ==
- Philip Dietrich, Count of Waldeck
- Emilie of Oldenburg-Delmenhorst
- Philipp Stolle
- Johann Hildebrand
- Konrad Viktor Schneider

== Deaths ==
- Bartholomäus Scultetus (born 1540)
- Jakob Ebert (born 1549)
