= Christian Wernicke =

German epigramist and diplomat

- Born: January 1661; Elbing (Elbląg), Kingdom of Poland
- Died: 1725; Copenhagen, Kingdom of Denmark
- Occupations: Epigramist, diplomat

Christian Wernicke (January 1661 – 5 September 1725) was a German epigramist and diplomat. His surname has also been spelled Wernigke, Warneck, and Werneke.

== Biography ==
Wernicke was born in Elbing (Elbląg), Royal Prussia, Poland. After attending school in Elbing and Thorn (Toruń), Wernicke studied philosophy and poetry under Daniel Georg Morhof at the University of Kiel in Holstein. He then spent three years at the court of Mecklenburg and took educational trips to Holland, France, and England, before settling in Hamburg in 1696, where he worked as a private scholar. From 1714 to 1723 he worked as an ambassador for the court of Denmark.

Wernicke's clear and rationale diction stands in contrast to that of his contemporaries Christian Hoffmann von Hoffmannswaldau and Christian Heinrich Postel. Wernicke was openly hostile to Christian Friedrich Hunold. He died in Copenhagen in 1725.

Wernicke's satirical writings were rediscovered by Johann Jakob Bodmer and were praised by Gotthold Ephraim Lessing and Johann Gottfried Herder in 1749.
