= Susanne von Klettenberg =

German abbess and writer

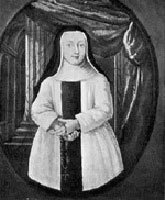
- Born: 19 December 1723
- Died: 16 December 1774 (aged 50)
- Occupations: Author, poet and writer

Susanne Katharina Seiffart von Klettenberg (19 December 1723 – 16 December 1774) was a German abbess and writer. She was a friend of Catharina Elisabeth Goethe, the mother of writer Johann Wolfgang von Goethe. Klettenberg corresponded with Goethe, and he shaped a character, "Beautiful Soul," after her in his novel Wilhelm Meister's Apprenticeship. She was also a friend of Friedrich Christoph Steinhofer (1706–1761), a former co-episcopus of the Moravian Church.
