= Johann Anton Coberg =

German composer

Johann Anton Coberg (1650 in Rotenburg, Hesse – 1708 in Berlin) was a German composer.

He was a student of Clamor Heinrich Abel and Nicolaus Adam Strungk. He was appointed to the new post of town organist at Hannover, and then to the court of Ernest Augustus, Elector of Brunswick-Lüneburg; among his duties including being music teacher to Sophia Charlotte of Hanover.

Several of works have been revived in the late 20th century. In September 2012 the Deutsche Kammerphilharmonie Bremen conducted by Reinhard Goebel included his orchestral suites alongside Johann Sebastian Bach and Johann Jakob Kress.
