= Friedrich Wilhelm Christians =

German banker

- Born: 1 May 1922; Paderborn, Germany
- Died: 24 May 2004 (aged 82); Düsseldorf, Germany
- Occupation: Banker

Friedrich Wilhelm Christians (1 May 1922 – 24 May 2004) was a German banker, who was co-head of Deutsche Bank and president of the Association of German Banks.

He studied law and joined one of the predecessor companies of Deutsche Bank in 1951. He became a member of the executive board of Deutsche Bank in 1965, and became co-chairman in 1976, serving with Wilfried Guth until 1985 and with Alfred Herrhausen until 1988. From 1988 to 1997, he was chairman of the supervisory board. He was President of the Association of German Banks from 1975 to 1979.

== Publications ==
- Wege nach Russland – Bankier im Spannungsfeld zwischen Ost und West. Hoffmann u. Campe, Hamburg 1989, ISBN 3-455-08337-4.
- Unternehmer und Gesellschaft. Arbeitgeberverb. d. Metallindustrie Köln, Köln 1982, ISBN 3-88575-017-1.
