= 1856 in Germany =

- Decades: 1830s; 1840s; 1850s; 1860s; 1870s
- See also: Other events of 1856; History of Germany • Timeline • Years

Events from the year 1856 in Germany.

== Incumbents ==
- King of Bavaria – Maximilian II
- King of Hanover – George V
- King of Prussia – Frederick William IV
- King of Saxony – John of Saxony

== Events ==
- August – Pre-human remains are found in the Neander Valley in Prussia.

== Births ==
- January 6 – Martin von Feuerstein, German painter (d. 1931)
- January 31 – Hermann von François, German general (d. 1933)
- February 12 – Eduard von Böhm-Ermolli, Austrian general, German field marshal (d. 1941)
- February 15 – Emil Kraepelin, German psychiatrist (d. 1926)
- February 17 – Arnold von Winckler, German general (d. 1945)

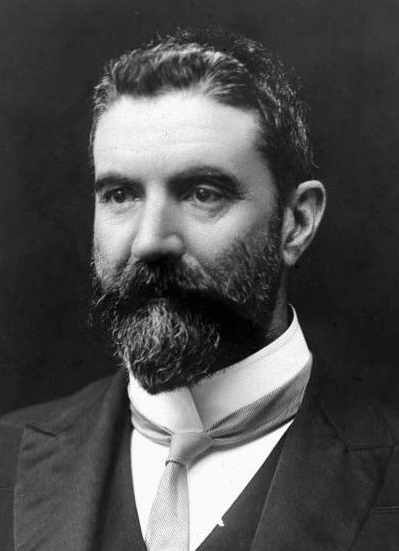
Alfred Deakin

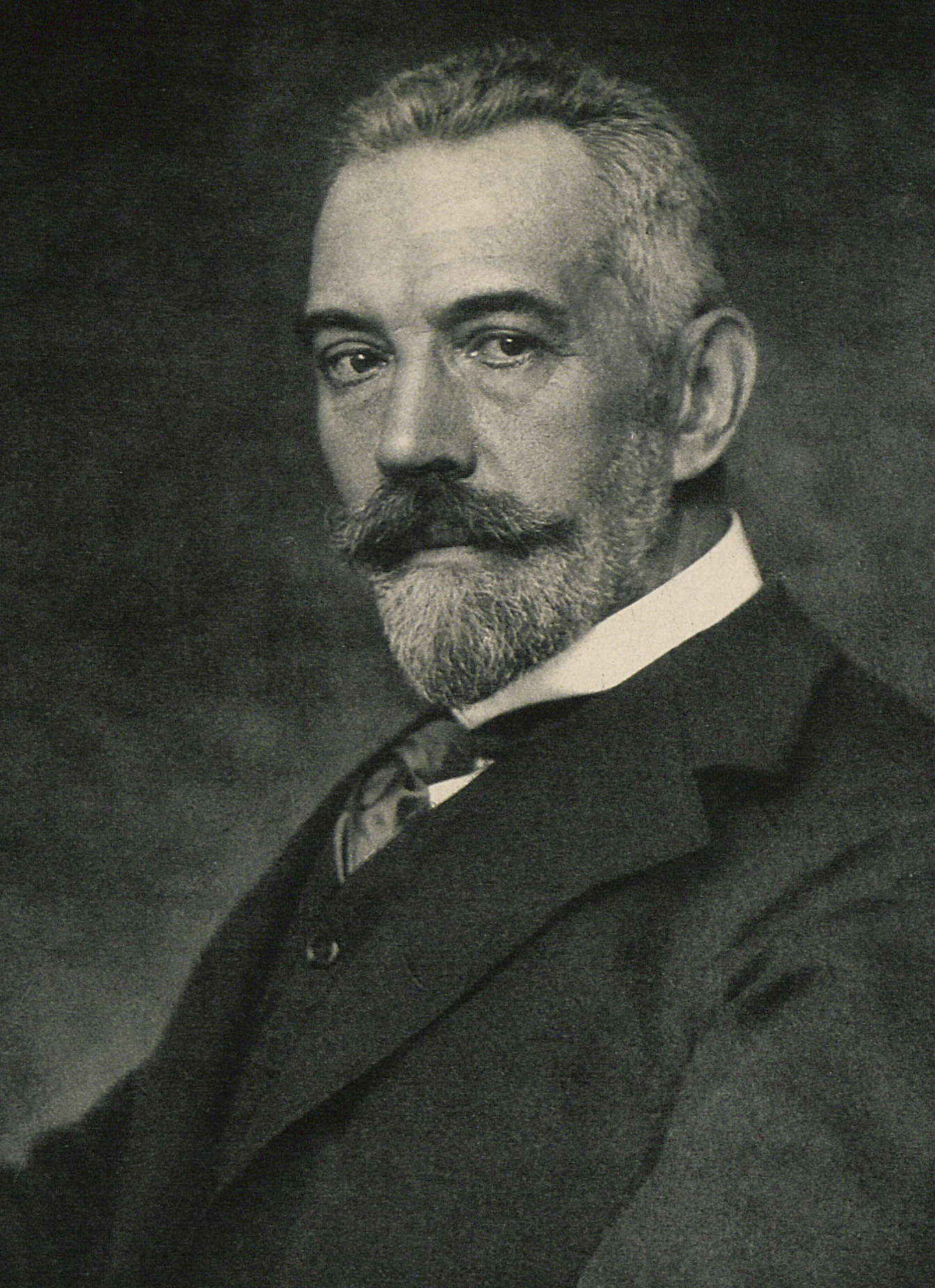
Theobald von Bethmann Hollweg

- July 7 – Georg von der Marwitz, German general (d. 1929)
- September 18 – Wilhelm von Gloeden, German photographer (d. 1931)
- November 16 – Jürgen Kröger, German architect (d. 1928)
- November 29 – Theobald von Bethmann Hollweg, Chancellor of Germany (d. 1921)
- December 25 – Hans von Bartels, German painter (d. 1913)

== Deaths ==
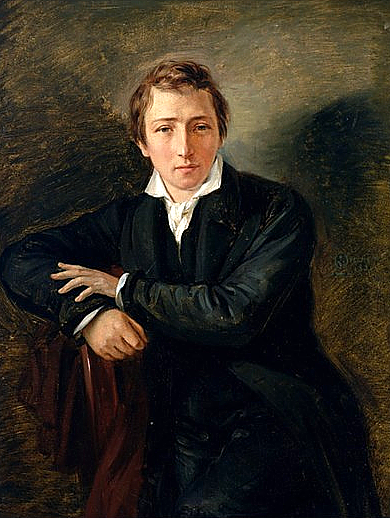
Heinrich Heine

- February 17 – Heinrich Heine, German writer (b. 1797)
- June 26 – Max Stirner, German philosopher (b. 1806)

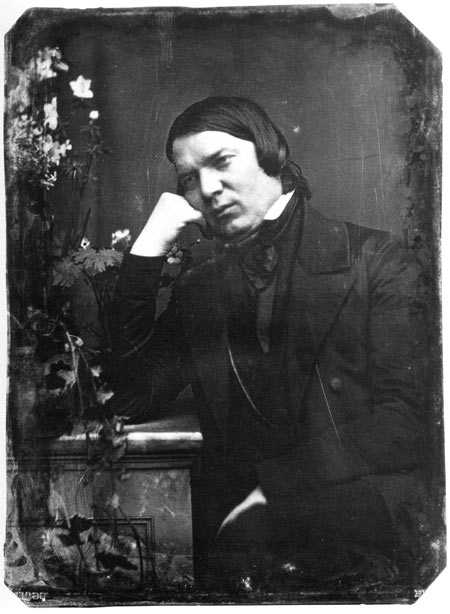
Robert Schumann

- July 29 -Robert Schumann, German composer, pianist (b. 1810)
