= Andreas Buchner (historian) =

German historian (1776–1854)

Joseph Andreas Buchner (28 November 1776, in Altheim – 13 December 1854, in Munich) was a German historian. He was the author of a highly regarded multi-volume work on Bavarian history.

He studied theology at the Georgianum in Munich, and was ordained as a priest in 1799. From 1804, he taught philosophy at the lyceum in Dillingen, then in 1811 relocated as a professor of history to the lyceum in Regensburg. In 1825, he became a member of the Bavarian Academy of Sciences, and during the following year, was named a professor of Bavarian history at the Ludwig-Maximilians-Universität München.

== Selected works ==
- Geschichte von Baiern (10 volumes 1820–55) – History of Bavaria.
- Lehrbuch der allgemeinen Geschichte (1826) – Textbook of general history.
- Neue Beiträge zur vaterländischen Geschichte, Geographie und Statistik : eine Fortsetzung der Westenrieder'schen Beiträge über dieselben Gegenstände (with Lorenz Zierl, 1832) – New contributions to national history, geography and statistics: a continuation of Lorenz von Westenrieder's contributions on the same subjects.
- Ueber die Einwohner Deutschlands im zweyten Jahrhundert der christlichen Zeitrechnung (1838) – On the inhabitants of Germany in the second century of the Christian chronology.
- Krieg des Herzogs Ludwig des Reichen mit Markgraf Albrecht Achilles von Brandenburg vom Jahr 1458-1462 (1842) – War of Louis IX, Duke of Bavaria with Margrave Albrecht Achilles of Brandenburg from the year 1458 to 1462.
- Landtafel der vier Rentämter des Fürstenthums Bayern zu Anfang der Regierung des Herzogs Maximilian I (1848) – Landtafel of the four rentamts of the principality of Bavaria at the beginning of the reign of Duke Maximilian I.
- Der letzte Landtag der altbayerischen Landstände im Jahre 1669 (1851) – The last Landtag of the old Bavarian provinces in 1669.
