= Jürgen Seydel =

German karateka (1917–2008)

- Born: 12 September 1917; Bonn, Germany
- Died: 3 August 2008 (aged 90)
- Style: Shotokan Karate

Other information
- Notable students: Elvis Presley

Jürgen Seydel (September 12, 1917 – August 3, 2008) was a German martial artist. Some have credited him as the father of karate in Germany.

In 1939 Seydel began judo training at the University of Bonn. In 1955, he read an article in a French magazine about karate, which was still unknown in Germany at the time; he traveled to Paris to learn this art. In 1957 Seydel founded according to the JKA the first karate club in Germany in Bad Homburg and soon opened a studio in Usingen. Jürgen learnt from a textbook by Henry Plée and with the knowledge he had acquired on courses. In 1959 he passed the exam for the 1st Dan. Until 1965 he was the only Dan carrier in Germany. Seydel's most prominent student was U.S. musician Elvis Presley, then stationed in Germany during his military service.

Jürgen Seydel was awarded the Order of Merit of the Federal Republic of Germany by Federal President Richard von Weizsäcker for his services to karate in Germany.

== Literature ==
- Werner Lind: Lexikon der Kampfkünste. China, Japan, Okinawa, Korea, Vietnam, Thailand, Burma, Indonesien, Indien, Mongolei, Philippinen, Taiwan u. a. Sportverlag, Berlin 1999, ISBN 3-328-00838-1, (Edition BSK).
