= 1858 in Germany =

- Decades: 1830s; 1840s; 1850s; 1860s; 1870s
- See also: Other events of 1858; History of Germany • Timeline • Years

Events from the year 1858 in Germany.

== Incumbents ==
- King of Bavaria – Maximilian II
- King of Hanover – George V
- King of Prussia – Frederick William IV
- King of Saxony – John of Saxony

== Events ==
- William becomes regent for his brother, Frederick William IV, who has suffered a stroke.
- January 25 – The Wedding March by Felix Mendelssohn becomes a popular wedding recessional, after it is played on this day at the marriage of Queen Victoria 's daughter Victoria, Princess Royal, to Prince Friedrich of Prussia in St James's Palace, London.

== Births ==
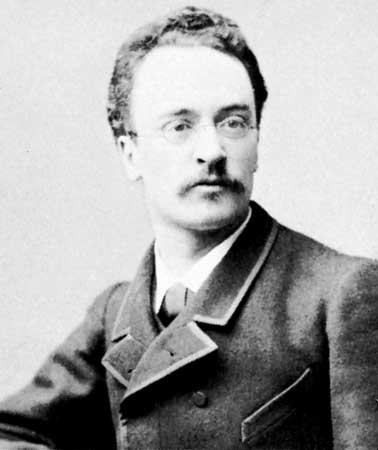
Rudolf Diesel

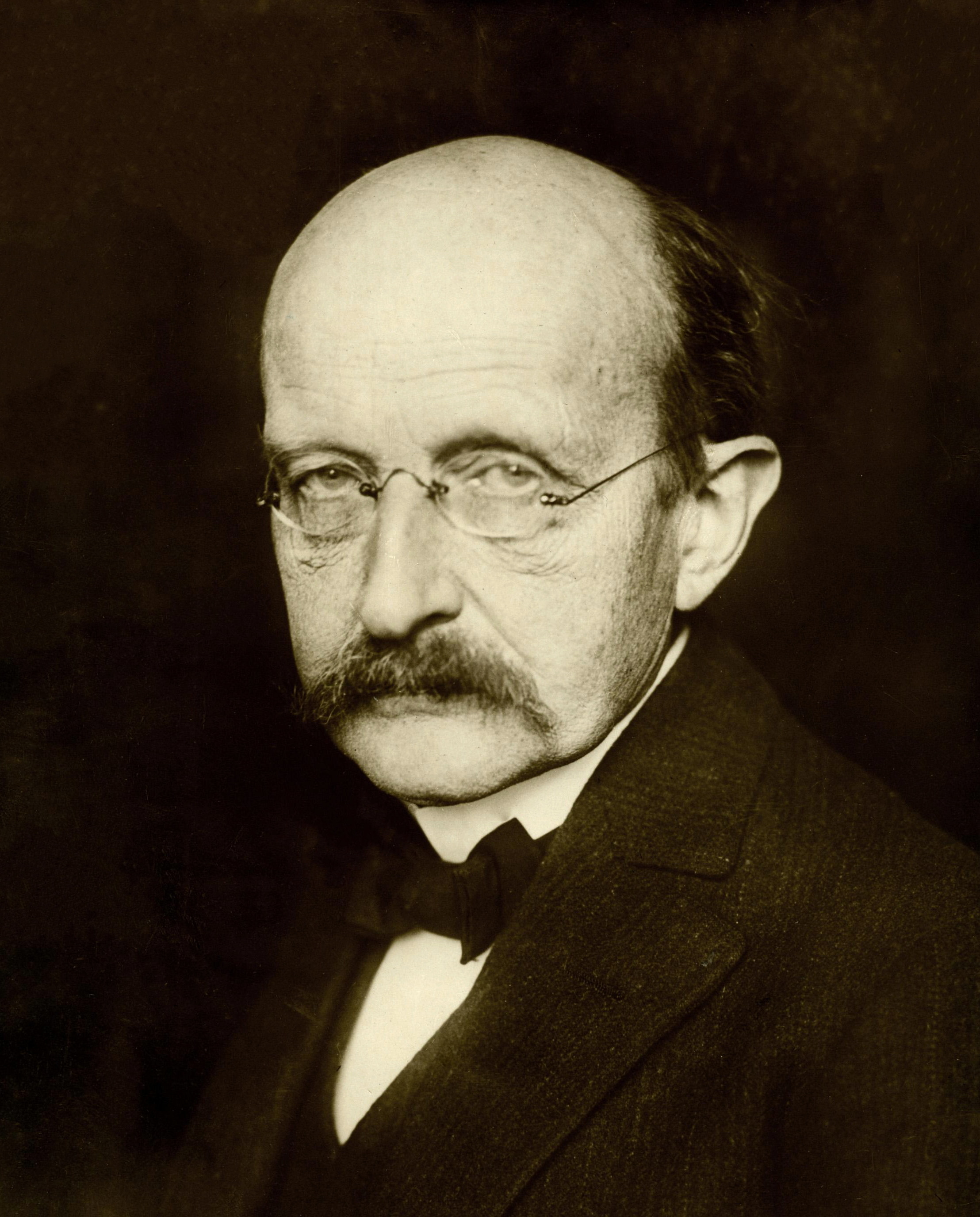
Max Planck

- January 10 – Heinrich Zille, German illustrator, photographer (d. 1929)
- February 18 – Wilhelm Schmidt, German pioneer of superheated steam for use in locomotives (d. 1924 )
- February 24 - Friedrich Schrempf, German editor, politician (d. 1913)
- March 18 – Rudolf Diesel, German inventor, automotive pioneer (d. 1913)
- March 23 – Ludwig Quidde, German pacifist, recipient of the Nobel Peace Prize (d. 1941)
- March 27 – Richard Friedrich Johannes Pfeiffer, German physician, bacteriologist (d. 1945)
- April 23 – Max Planck, German physicist, Nobel Prize laureate (d. 1947)
- July 9 – Franz Boas, German anthropologist (d. 1942)
- November 10 – Heinrich XXVII, Prince Reuss Younger Line (d. 1928)
- December 19 – Adolf Schiel, German-born officer in Boer armed forces (d. 1903)

== Deaths ==
- February 13 – Hermann Heinrich Gossen, economist (b. 1810)
- March 20 – Johannes Gossner, theologian and philanthropist (b. 1810)
- June 3 – Julius Reubke, German composer (b. 1834)
- December 13 – Karl Ludwig Philipp Zeyher, German botanist (b. 1799 )
