= Karl Zilgas =

German footballer

Personal information
- Date of birth: 2 March 1882
- Date of death: 17 June 1917 (aged 35)
- Position: Forward

Senior career*
Years	Team	Apps	(Gls)
- SC Victoria Hamburg

International career
1913	Germany	1	(0)
- * Club domestic league appearances and goals

Karl Zilgas (2 March 1882 – 17 June 1917) was a German international footballer.
