= Johannes Pharamund Rhumelius =

German physician (1597–1661)

Johannes Pharamond Rhumelius (1597–1661) was a German alchemist and physician, and a contemporary of Jan Baptist van Helmont. He was born in Neumark and died in Nuremberg.

He is chiefly notable for his works on alchemical medicine, Opuscula Chemico-Magico-Medica (Noremburgse, 1635), Medicina Spagyrica Tripartita (1648), the Compendium Hermeticum (1635) and the Compendium fortificatorium (1632).

His Spagyric Medicine also appeared in German translation as Medicina Spagyrica oder spagyrische Artzneykunst (Frankfurt, 1662), and in a French edition: Médecine spagyrique (1648).

He is described as the son of the doctor John Conrad Rhumelius, a Catholic, a "discípulo de Paracelso," and he also wrote under the pseudonym of "Solomon Raphael."

== See also ==
- Paracelsus
- Robert Fludd
- Jan Baptist van Helmont

== Bibliography ==
- Allen G. Debus, The Chemical Philosophy, Dover Publications, 2003, pp. 453–4
- Lynn Thorndike, A History of Magic and Experimental Science, part 12, 1923, pp. 192–4
