= Wilhelm Walloth =

German writer

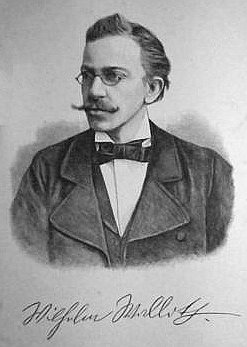
Wilhelm Walloth

Wilhelm Walloth (1854–1932) was a German writer.

== Life ==
His parents died very early, so that Wilhelm Walloth and two-year younger brother Frederick grew up as orphans in a childless couple Hessian. Although well protected, Walloth was often sickly. At age 17, he lost his foster mother.

Early Walloth wrote poems, his idol was Ludwig Uhland . First Walloth saw his future in painting, but then studied in Heidelberg philosophy, aesthetics and literature. During this time, his first poems in 1882 already appeared in book form. In the following years he turned entirely on the painting out and wrote his most important historical novels and contemporary novels. His novels were imbued with the naturalism and leading naturalists as Michael Georg Conrad, Konrad Alberti and Karl Bleibtreu saw Walloth as an innovator of the historical novel. Because of this proximity to the naturalists, the prosecutor discovered his books and in 1890 he became, together with Konrad Alberti and other writers in Leipzig realist process charged with "lewd writings". After his studies back in Darmstadt, he was exposed to new hostilities. Reason was his friendship with the high school students Nodnagel Paul, under the pseudonym G. Ludwig in the literary journal The Company had praised novels Walloths. The boy committed suicide, and because Walloths reputation as a nerd and his role in the literary process, this fact was attributed to the use of the poet. A few years later Walloth moved to Munich, where he remained until his death. There he turned to the writing of plays, but they were received with little success. The study of homoerotic love affairs ( A nerd, Eros ) and a certain pessimism of the author, the main characters often end with suicide, and the bankruptcy of his former publisher Wilhelm Friedrich had a low perception of the works in the public order. Walloths major works' Tiberius and Octavia were reissued in 1917 in the series "novels of world literature" by the publisher Hesse & Becker. His wealth lost due to inflation after the First World War, he had to rely on the help of well-meaning people. In his last years he dealt with the theosophy of Rudolf Steiner .

Wilhelm Walloth continued to write until his death in 1932, but he was almost forgotten and many of his manuscripts from this period were lost.

== Works ==
- 1882 Gedichte
- 1883 Das Schatzhaus des Königs (novel)
- 1885 Oktavia (novel)
- 1886 Paris, der Mime (novel)
- 1886 Seelenräthsel (novel)
- 1887 Aus der Praxis (novel)
- 1888 Am Starnberger See
- 1888 Der Gladiator (novel)
- 1888 Dramen ("Gräfin Pustela", "Johann v. Schwaben", "Marino Falieri")
- 1889 Tiberius (novel)
- 1889 Der Dämon des Neides (novel)
- 1890 Ovid (novel)
- 1890 Gesammelte Gedichte
- 1891 Neue Dramen ("Semiramis", "Das Opfer", "Alboin")
- 1892 Ein Liebespaar (novel)
- 1893 Es fiel ein Reif...! (novel)
- 1894 Narren der Liebe (short story)
- 1897 Im Banne der Hypnose (novel)
- 1901 Ein Sonderling (novel)
- 1906 Eros (novel)
- 1909 Im Schatten des Todes (novel)
- 1909 Der neue Heiland (novel)
- 1911 Walloth Museum (poems in 2 volumes)
- 1924 Die Krone der Königin Zenobia
- 1927 Sokrates (drama)
- 1928 Eine seltsame Leidenschaft
- 1929 Sappho und Lydia (theatre-4 plays)
