= 1860 in Germany =

- Decades: 1840s; 1850s; 1860s; 1870s; 1880s
- See also: Other events of 1860; History of Germany • Timeline • Years

Events from the year 1860 in Germany.

== Incumbents ==
- King of Bavaria – Maximilian II
- King of Hanover – George V
- King of Prussia – Frederick William IV
- King of Saxony – John
- King of Württemberg – William I of Württemberg
- Grand Duke of Baden – Frederick I

== Events ==
- 17 May – The sports club TSV 1860 Munich is founded in the Bavarian capital of Munich
- 3 September – The Karlsruhe Congress of chemists begins

=== Undated ===
- Cologne Zoological Garden is opened.
- Erlenmeyer flask is created by Emil Erlenmeyer.

== Births ==
- 14 February – Eugen Schiffer, German politician (died 1954)
- 25 March – Friedrich Naumann, German politician (died 1919)
- 4 May – Hans Georg Friedrich Groß, German balloonist and airship constructor (died 1924)
- 20 May – Eduard Buchner, German chemist, winner of the 1907 Nobel Prize in Chemistry (died 1917)
- 4 June – Friedrich Schmidt-Ott, German lawyer, scientific organizer, and science policymaker (died (1956)
- 5 July – Albert Döderlein, German obstetrician and gynecologist (died 1941)
- 24 July – Princess Charlotte of Prussia, Prussian princess (died 1919)
- 25 July – Princess Louise Margaret of Prussia, Prussian princess (died 1917)
- 13 September – Konstantin Schmidt von Knobelsdorf, German general (died 1936)
- 28 October – Hugo Preuß, German lawyer and liberal politician (died 1925)
- 24 November — Ulrike Henschke, German women's right activist and education reformer (died 1897)

== Deaths ==
- 9 January – Karl Rudolf Brommy, German naval officer (born 1804)
- 29 January – Ernst Moritz Arndt, historian, writer and poet (born 1769)
- 15 April – Christine Genast, actress, singer and pianist (born 1798)
- 14 May – Ludwig Bechstein, writer (born 1801)
- 18 June – Friedrich Wilhelm von Bismarck, diplomat and military writer (born 1783)
- 21 September – Arthur Schopenhauer, philosopher (born 1788)
- 25 November – Duke Paul Wilhelm of Württemberg, nobleman, explorer and writer (born 1797)
- 21 December – Peter Friedhofen, German Roman Catholic professed religious and the founder of the Brothers of Mercy of Mary Help of Christians (born 1819)
