= Johann Heinrich Zopf =

German historian

Johann Heinrich Zopf (16 April 1691 – 1 February 1774) was a German theologian, historian, and logician. Born in Gera, he studied there and at the University of Jena, receiving a Magister degree in 1714 and the venia legendi in 1715. He later held academic and clerical positions in Halle and Essen, where he served as director of the Evangelical Lutheran Gymnasium and preacher at the Gertrudskirche.
