= Konstantin Schmidt von Knobelsdorf =

German officer (1860–1936)

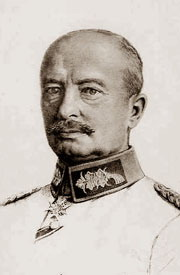
Konstantin Schmidt von Knobelsdorf

Konstantin Schmidt von Knobelsdorf (Frankfurt (Oder), 13 December 1860 – Glücksburg, 1 September 1936) was a Prussian military officer, and a general in the First World War.

He joined the German army at the age of 18. By 1912 he was Major general and Oberquartiermeister of the German General Staff. In 1914 he was promoted to Lieutenant general.

At the outbreak of World War I, he became Chief of Staff of the 5th German Army, which was formally led by Crown Prince Wilhelm of Germany. But the Crown Prince was only thirty-two years old and had never commanded a unit larger than a regiment, and was therefore ordered by his father the Emperor, Wilhelm II, to always follow the advice of his experienced Chief of Staff.

Schmidt von Knobelsdorf was one of the main architects of the plans to launch a major attack against the French at Verdun in February 1916. As de facto leader of the 5th Army, it was also Schmidt von Knobelsdorf who directed the attack and who pushed for victory at all costs. This led to several conflicts with the Crown Prince. When the attacks didn't deliver the expected results, Schmidt von Knobelsdorf was awarded the Pour le Mérite with Oak Leaves on 21 August 1916, and moved to command the X Corps at the Eastern Front. As Chief of Staff of the 5th Army, he was replaced by Walther von Lüttwitz.

Until the end of the war, he remained commander of the X Corps, which was moved to the Western Front by the end of 1916. He was promoted to General of the Infantry just before the Armistice.

Schmidt von Knobelsdorf retired from the Army on 30 September 1919.

He died on 1 September 1936 at the age of 75.
