= Otto Wissig =

Otto Wissig (1853–1933) was a Protestant German parson and author.

Wissig was born in Giessen. He came to Bad Nauheim in October 1892, where he had the Dankeskirche built. After his retirement in 1926 he devoted himself to writing and publishing a number of fictional and historical books; Wynfrid Bonifatius - ein Charakterbild nach seinen Briefen (1929) and its sequel Iroschotten und Bonifatius in Deutschland (1932) are regarded as his main historical works. In those books, he maintains an argument first brought forward by Johannes Heinrich August Ebrard, that Saint Boniface in his missionary work in Germany destroyed a viable church that had been founded by Irish/Scottish missionaries.
