= 1849 in Germany =

- Decades: 1820s; 1830s; 1840s; 1850s; 1860s
- See also: Other events of 1849; History of Germany • Timeline • Years

Events from the year 1849 in Germany.

== Incumbents ==
- King of Bavaria – Maximilian II
- King of Hanover – Ernest Augustus
- King of Prussia – Frederick William IV
- King of Saxony – Frederick Augustus II

== Events ==
- March – The Frankfurt Parliament completes its drafting of a liberal constitution, and elects Frederick William IV emperor of the new German national state.
- April 2 – The German revolutions of 1848–49 fail, as King Frederick William IV of Prussia refuses to accept the offer of the Frankfurt National Assembly to be crowned as German emperor.
- May 3 -The May Uprising in Dresden, last of the German revolutions of 1848–49, begins. Richard Wagner is among the participants.
- May 9 – The May Uprising in Dresden is suppressed by the Kingdom of Saxony.
- June 1 8-German revolutions of 1848–49: The chamber of the Frankfurt Parliament, since reduced to a rump parliament and moved to Stuttgart, was occupied by the Württemberg army. Repression began, which would force the liberal Forty-Eighters into exile.
- December 3 – German missionaries Johann Ludwig Krapf and Johannes Rebmann become the first Europeans to see Mount Kenya . The Abgeordnetenhaus, the lower house of the parliament of the Kingdom of Bavaria, passes a bill granting German Jews the same legal rights as German Christians. The measure draws a strong reaction from Christians across Bavaria, who sign petitions urging the upper house to prevent the equal rights measure from becoming law.

== Births ==
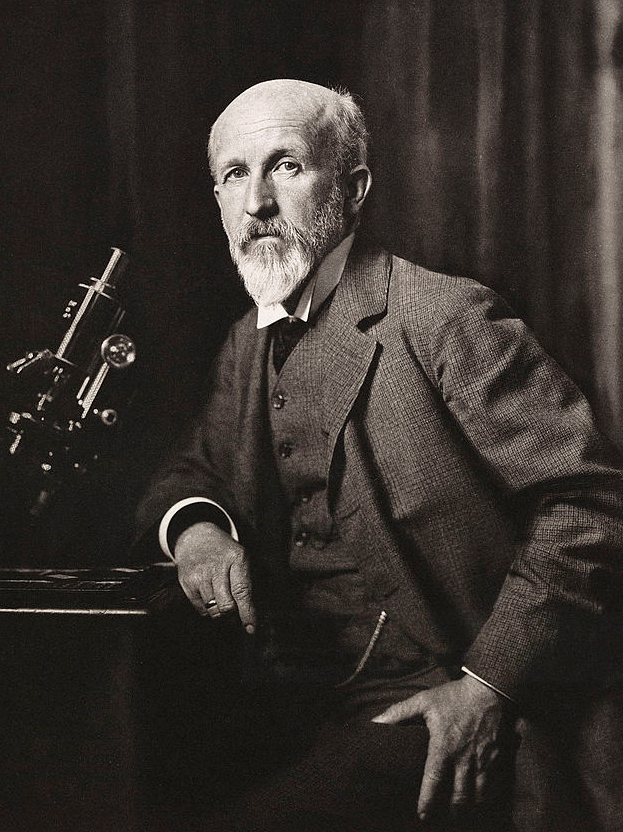
Oscar Hertwig

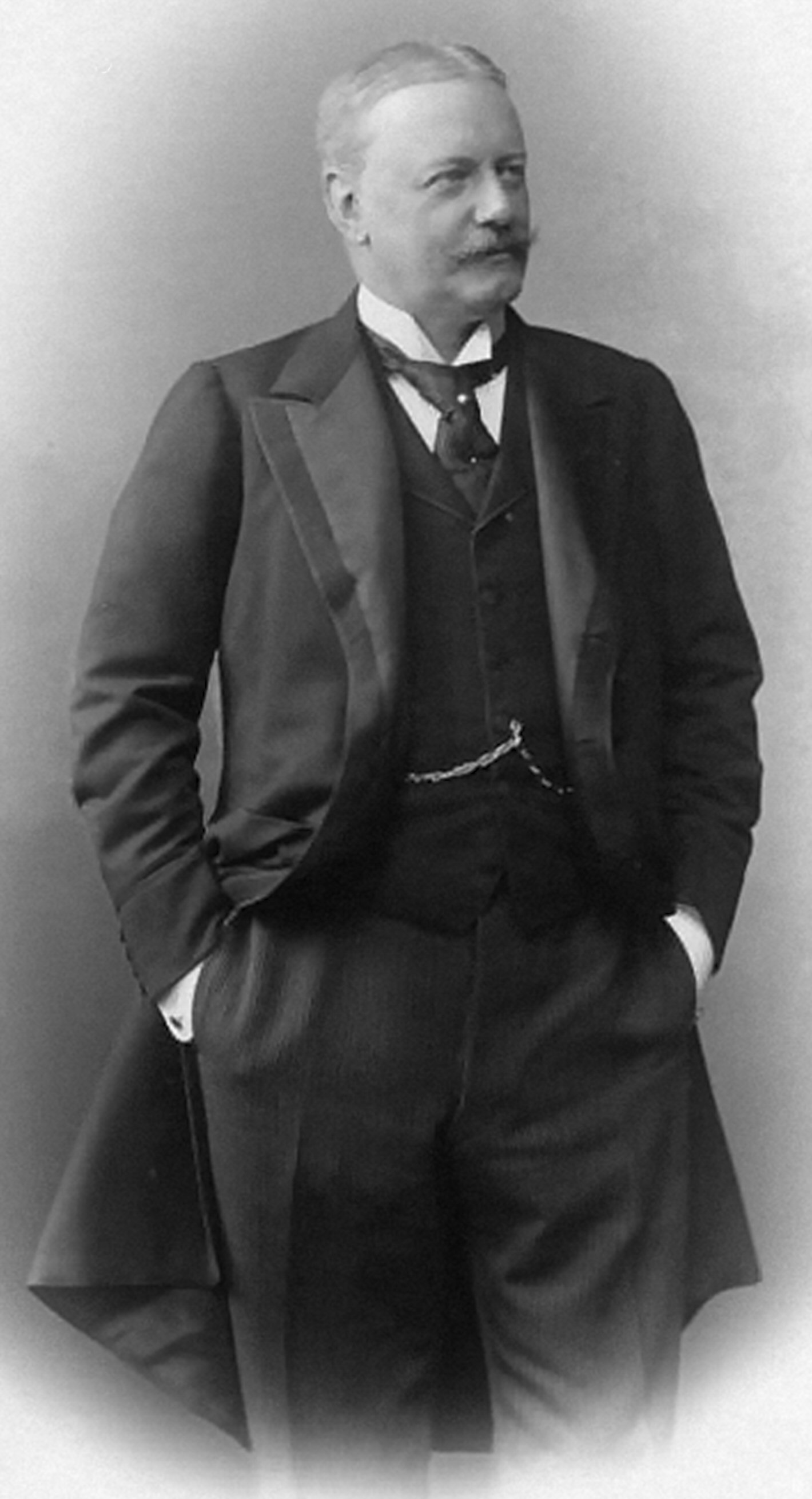
Bernhard von Bülow

- March 19 – Alfred von Tirpitz, German admiral (d. 1930)
- April 21 – Oscar Hertwig, German zoologist (d. 1922)
- April 25 – Felix Klein, German mathematician (d. 1925)
- May 3
  - Bertha Benz, German automotive pioneer (d. 1944)
  - Bernhard von Bülow, 8th Chancellor of Germany (d. 1929)
- July 22 – Emma Lazarus, American author and activist (d. 1887 )
- July 24 – August Scherl, German newspaper magnate (d. 1921)
- July 29 -Edward Theodore Compton, English-German painter, mountain climber (d. 1921 )
- September 23 – Hugo von Seeliger, German astronomer (d. 1924 )
- October 26 – Ferdinand Georg Frobenius, German mathematician (d. 1917 )
- December 5 – Eduard Seler, Prussian scholar, Mesoamericanist (d. 1922 )
- December 6 – August von Mackensen, German field marshal (d. 1945 )

== Deaths ==
- February 28 – Regina von Siebold, German physician, obstetrician (b. 1771)
- March 24 – Johann Wolfgang Döbereiner, German chemist (b. 1780)
- May 11 -Otto Nicolai, German composer, conductor (b. 1810 )
- September 4 – Friedrich Laun, German novelist (b. 1770 )
- September 6 – Andreas Joseph Hofmann, German philosopher and revolutionary (b. 1752 )
