= 1855 in Germany =

- Decades: 1830s; 1840s; 1850s; 1860s; 1870s
- See also: Other events of 1855; History of Germany • Timeline • Years

The following events occurred in Germany in the year 1855.

== Incumbents ==
- King of Bavaria – Maximilian II
- King of Hanover – George V
- King of Prussia – Frederick William IV
- King of Saxony – John of Saxony

== Events ==
- The cocaine alkaloid is first isolated by German chemist Friedrich Gaedcke

== Births ==
- February 17 – Otto Liman von Sanders, German general (d. 1929)
- February 24 – Johannes von Eben, German general (d. 1924 )
- May 9 – Julius Röntgen, German-Dutch classical composer (d. 1932)
- June 28 – Theodor Reuss, German occultist (d. 1923)
- July 26 – Ferdinand Tönnies, German sociologist (d. 1936)
- August 25 – Hugo von Pohl, German admiral (d. 1916)
- August 27 – Hugo von Kathen, German general (d. 1932)
- September 9 – Houston Stewart Chamberlain, British-born German writer (d. 1927)
- October 10 – Eduard von Capelle, German admiral (d. 1931)

== Deaths ==
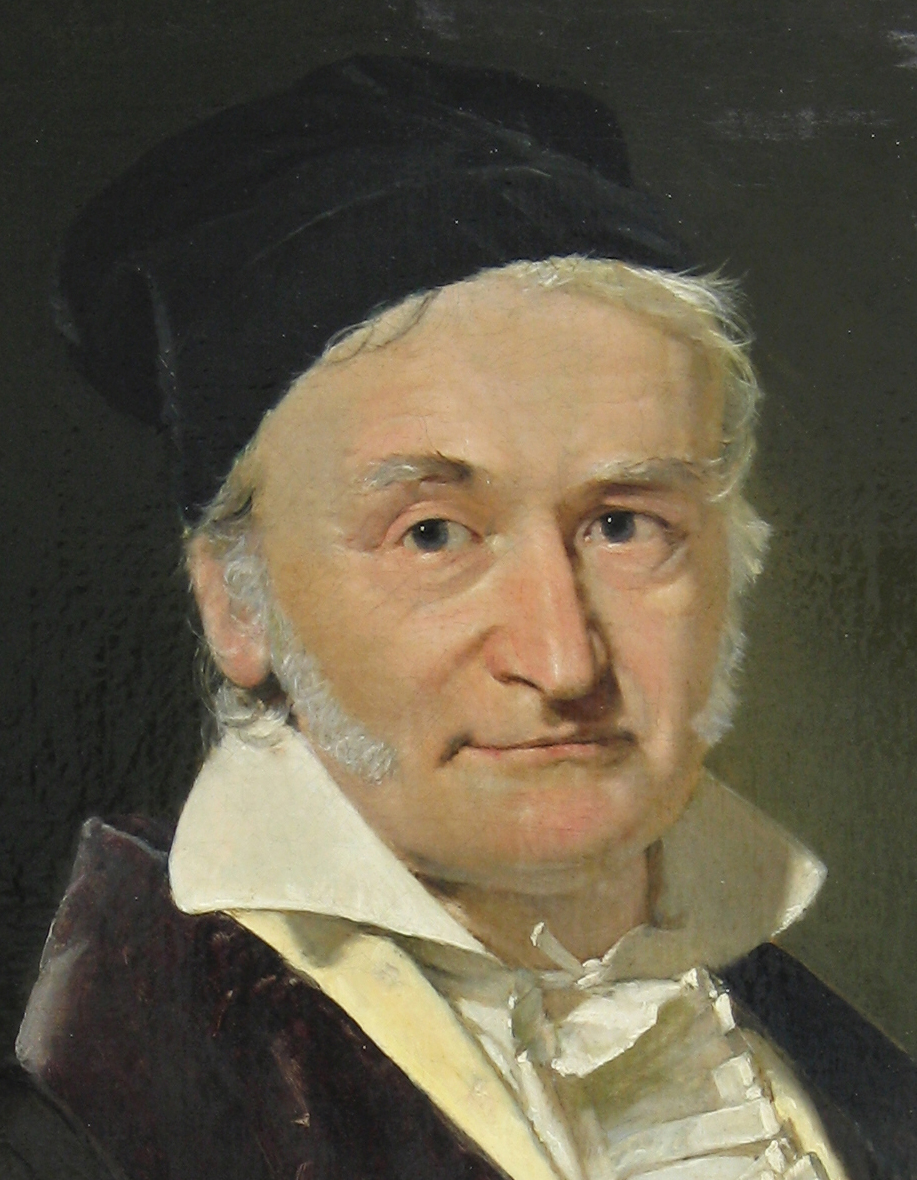
Carl Friedrich Gauss

- February 23 – Carl Friedrich Gauss, German mathematician, astronomer, and physicist (b. 1777)
