= 1852 in Germany =

- Decades: 1830s; 1840s; 1850s; 1860s; 1870s
- See also: Other events of 1852; History of Germany • Timeline • Years

Events from the year 1852 in Germany.

== Incumbents ==
- King of Bavaria – Maximilian II
- King of Hanover – George V
- King of Prussia – Frederick William IV
- King of Saxony – Frederick Augustus II

== Event ==
- 8 May – Prussia signs the 1852 London Protocol, a treaty ending the First Schleswig War by nominally returning Schleswig and Holstein to Denmark, while effectively guaranteeing their independence

== Births ==
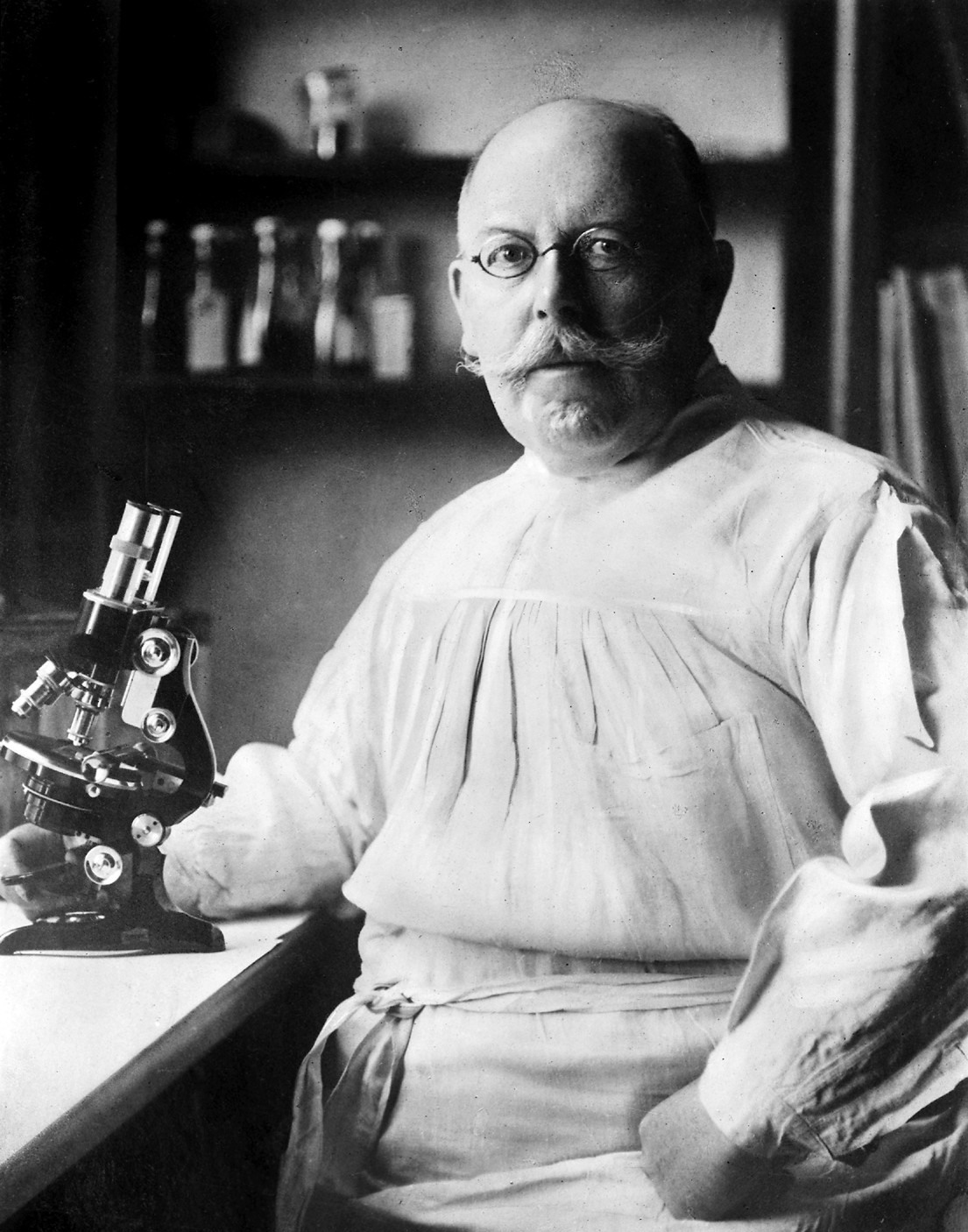
Friedrich Loeffler

- 11 January – Constantin Fehrenbach, Chancellor of Germany (d. 1926)
- 2 May – Max von Gallwitz, German general (d. 1937)
- 31 May -Julius Richard Petri, German bacteriologist (d. 1921)
- 25 June - Friedrich Loeffler, German bacteriologist (d. 1915)
- 9 October – Emil Fischer, German chemist, Nobel Prize laureate (d. 1919)
- 10 December - Felix Graf von Bothmer, German general (d. 1937)
- 19 December – Albert A. Michelson, German-born physicist, Nobel Prize laureate (d. 1931)

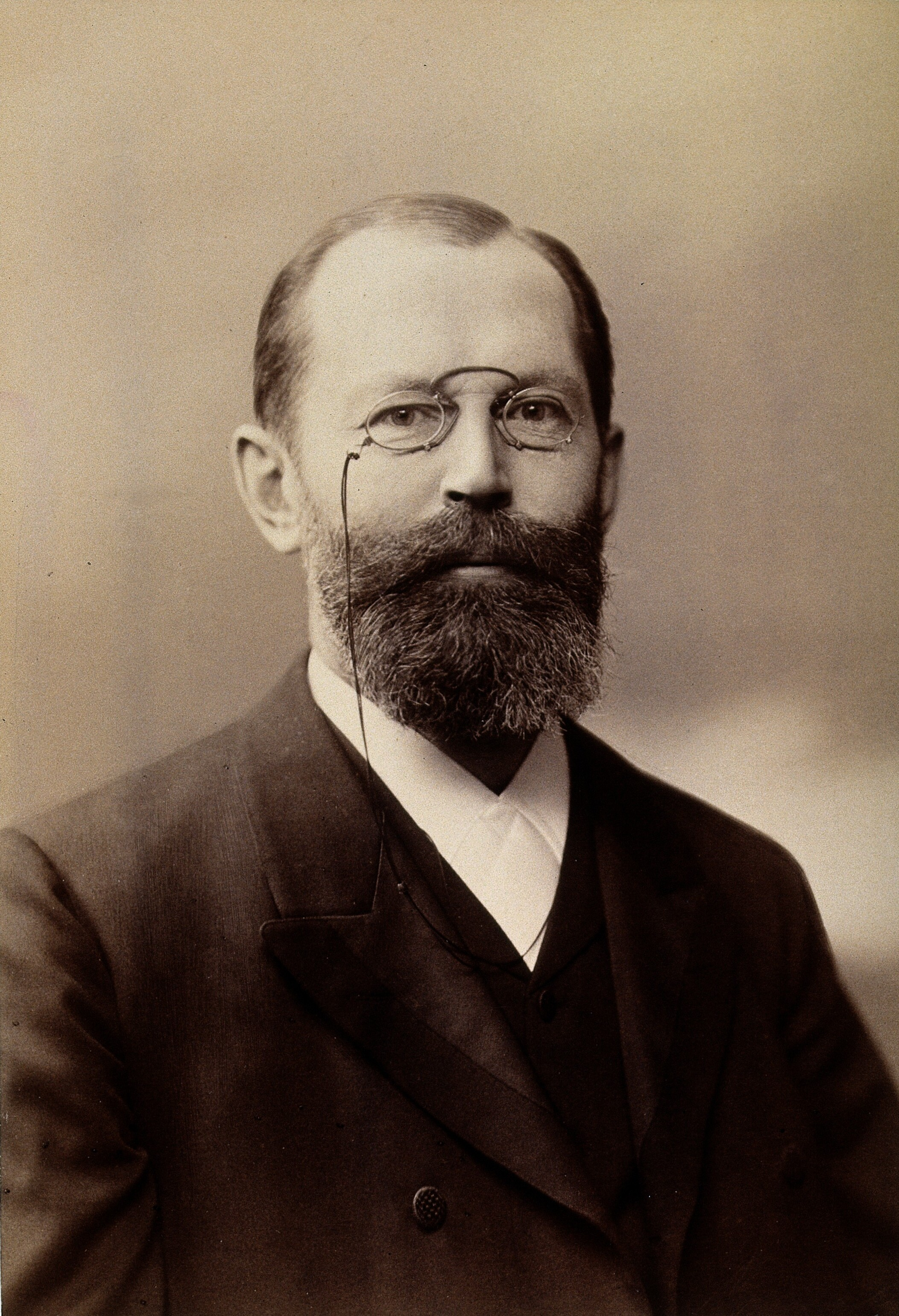
Hermann Emil Fischer

== Deaths ==
- 21 June – Friedrich Fröbel, German pedagogue (b. 1782)
- 15 October – Friedrich Ludwig Jahn, German gymnastics educator (b. 1778)
- 17 November – Adolph Carl August von Eschenmayer, German philosopher (b. 1768)
