= 1857 in Germany =

- Decades: 1830s; 1840s; 1850s; 1860s; 1870s
- See also: Other events of 1857; History of Germany • Timeline • Years

Events from the year 1857 in Germany.

== Incumbents ==
- King of Bavaria – Maximilian II
- King of Hanover – George V
- King of Prussia – Frederick William IV
- King of Saxony – John of Saxony

== Births ==
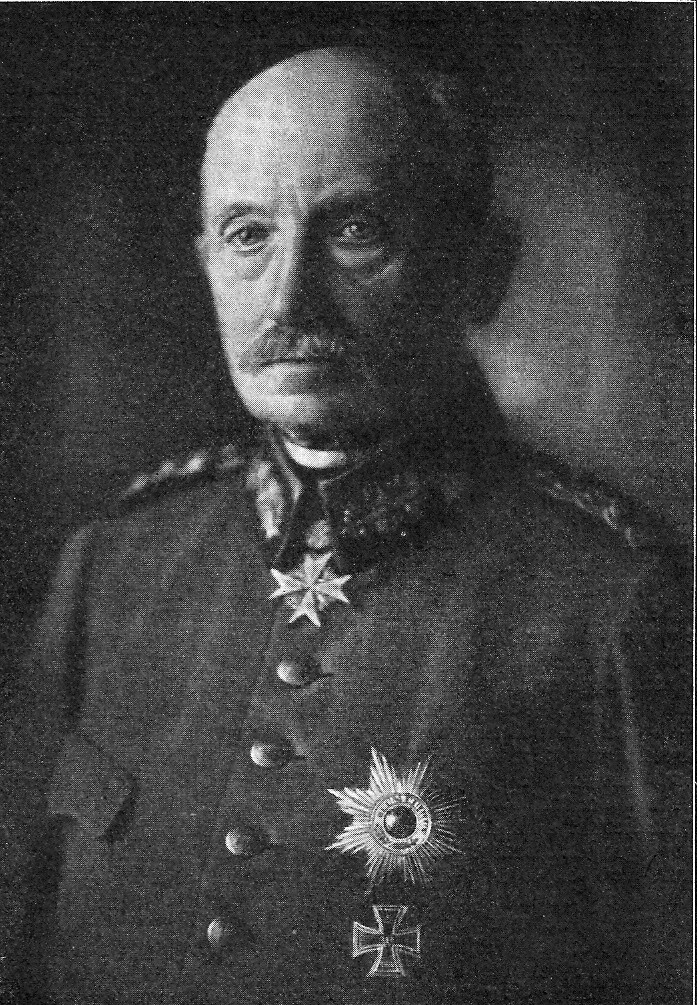
Otto von Below

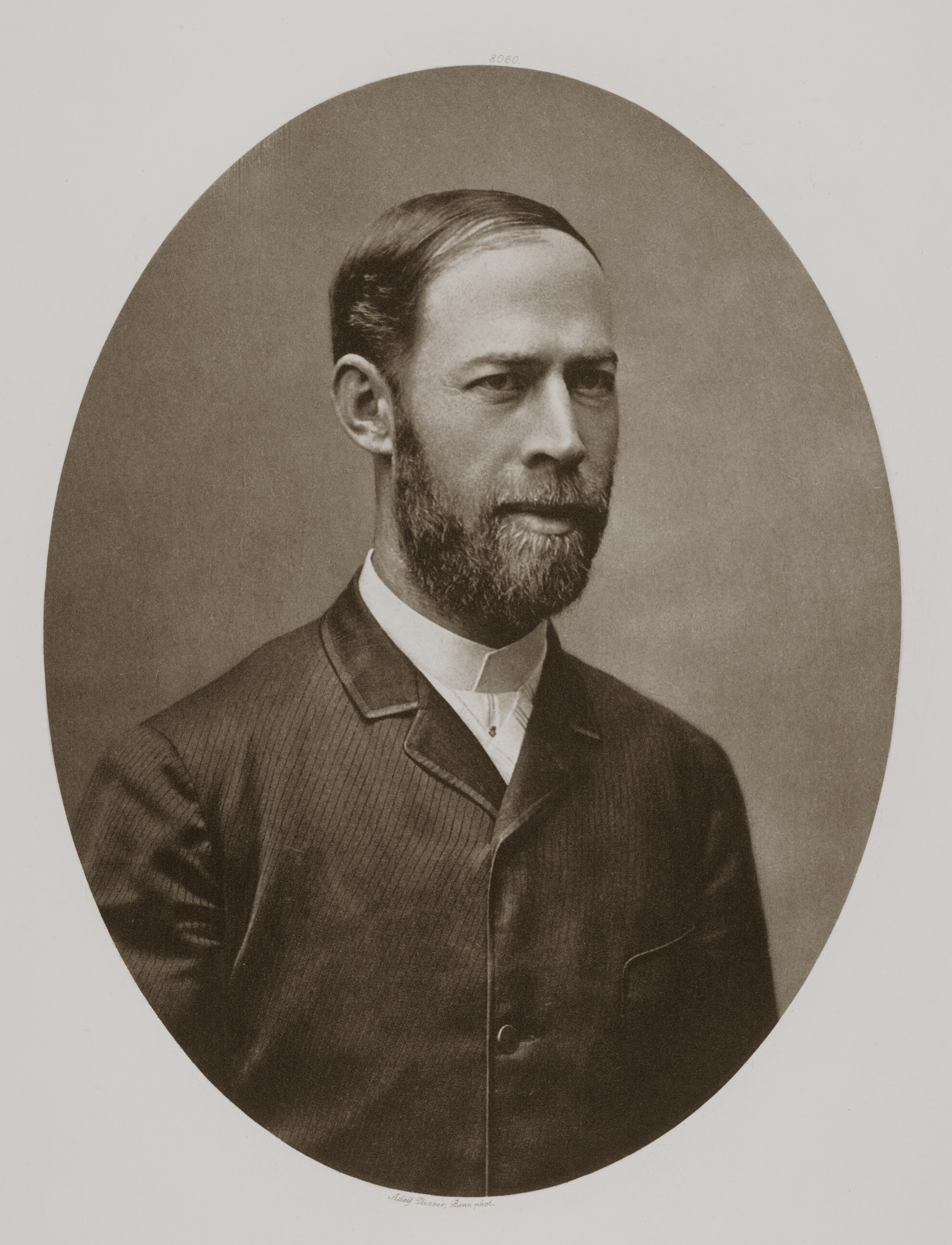
Heinrich Hertz

- January 18 – Otto von Below, German general (d. 1944)
- February 22 - Heinrich Hertz, German physicist (d. 1894 )
- April 30 – Walter Simon, German philanthropist (d. 1920)
- May 27 – Theodor Curtius, German chemist (d. 1928)
- June 30 – Friedrich von Ingenohl, German admiral (d. 1933)
- July 5 – Clara Zetkin, German-born Marxist theorist, activist and women's rights advocate (d. 1933)
- July 19 – Eugen Bamberger, German chemist (d. 1932)
- July 23 – Carl Meinhof, German linguist (d. 1944)
- August 14 – Max Wagenknecht, German composer (d. 1922)
- August 15 – Albert Ballin, German shipping magnate, owner of the Hamburg America Line (d. 1918)
- August 27 – Oskar von Hutier, German general (d. 1934)
- September 8 – Georg Michaelis, Chancellor of Germany (d. 1936)
- November 29 – Theodor Escherich, German pediatrician (d. 1911)
- December 3 – Franz Bunke, German painter (d. 1939 )

== Deaths ==
- January 27 – Dorothea Lieven, Baltic-German diplomat in Russian services (b. 1785)

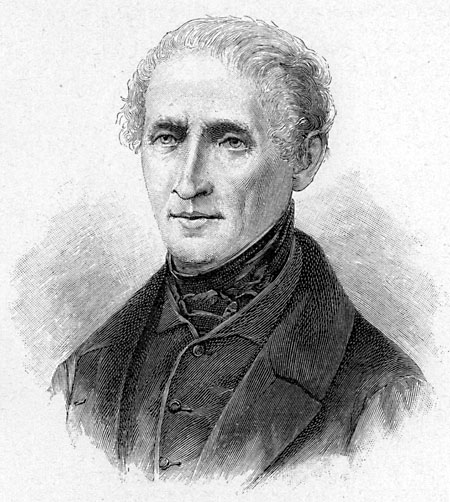
Joseph Eichendorff

- November 26 – Joseph von Eichendorff, German poet (b. 1788)
- December 3 – Christian Daniel Rauch, German sculptor (b. 1777)
