= 1851 in Germany =

- Decades: 1830s; 1840s; 1850s; 1860s; 1870s
- See also: Other events of 1851; History of Germany • Timeline • Years

Events from the year 1851 in Germany.

== Incumbents ==
- King of Bavaria – Maximilian II
- King of Hanover –
  - Ernest Augustus till 18 November 1851
  - George V after 18 November 1851
- King of Prussia – Frederick William IV
- King of Saxony – Frederick Augustus II

== Events ==
- February 1 – Brandtaucher, the oldest surviving submersible craft, sinks during acceptance trials in the German port of Kiel, but the designer, Wilhelm Bauer, and the two crew escape successfully.

== Births ==
- March 24 – Friedrich von Scholtz, German general (d. 1927)
- April 1 – Bruno von Mudra, German general (d. 1931)
- May 7 – Adolf von Harnack, German Lutheran theologian, church historian (d. 1930)

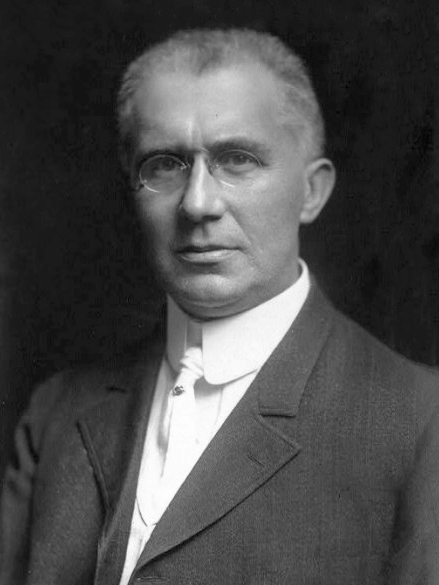
Emile Berliner

- May 20 – Emile Berliner, German-born American telephone and recording pioneer (d. 1929)
- September 21 – Arthur Schuster, German-British physicist (d. 1934)
- November 27 – Friedrich Sixt von Armin, German general (d. 1936)

== Deaths ==
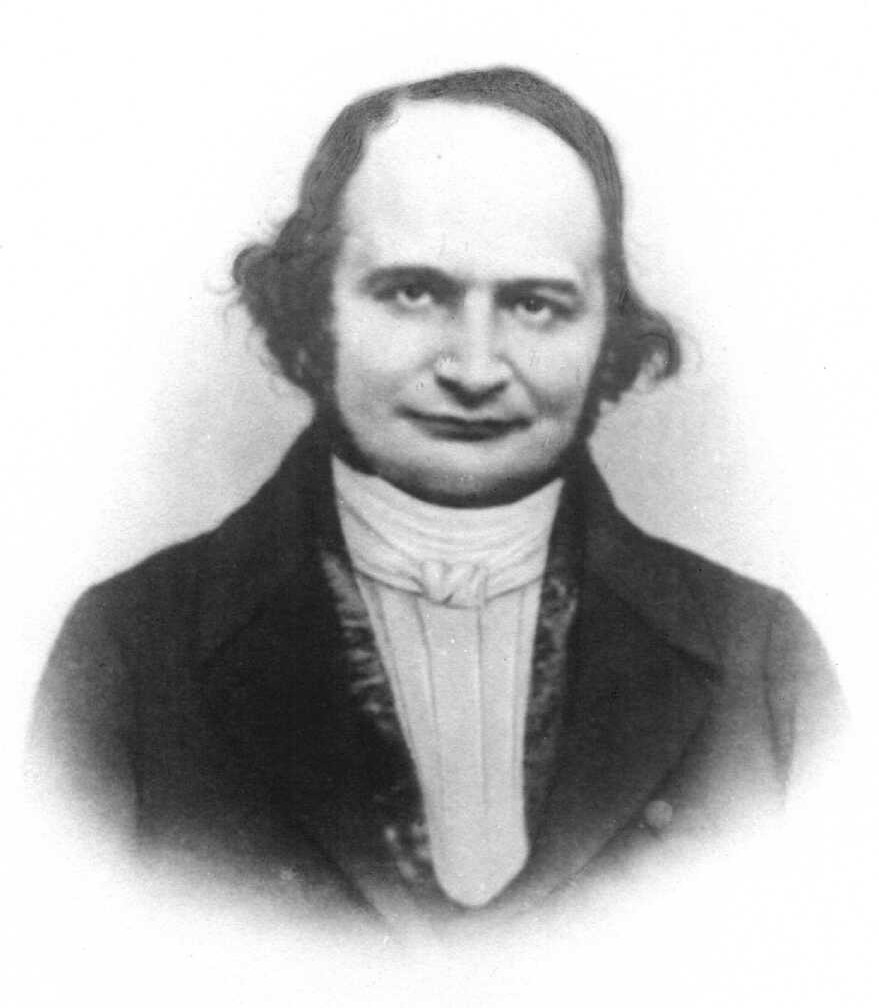
Carl Gustav Jacob Jacobi

- January 10 – Karl Freiherr von Müffling, Prussian field marshal (b. 1775)
- January 21 – Albert Lortzing, German composer (b. 1801)
- February 18 – Carl Gustav Jacob Jacobi, German mathematician (b. 1804)
- July 17 – Roger Sheaffe, British general (b. 1763)
- November 18- Ernest Augustus, King of Hanover (b. 1771)
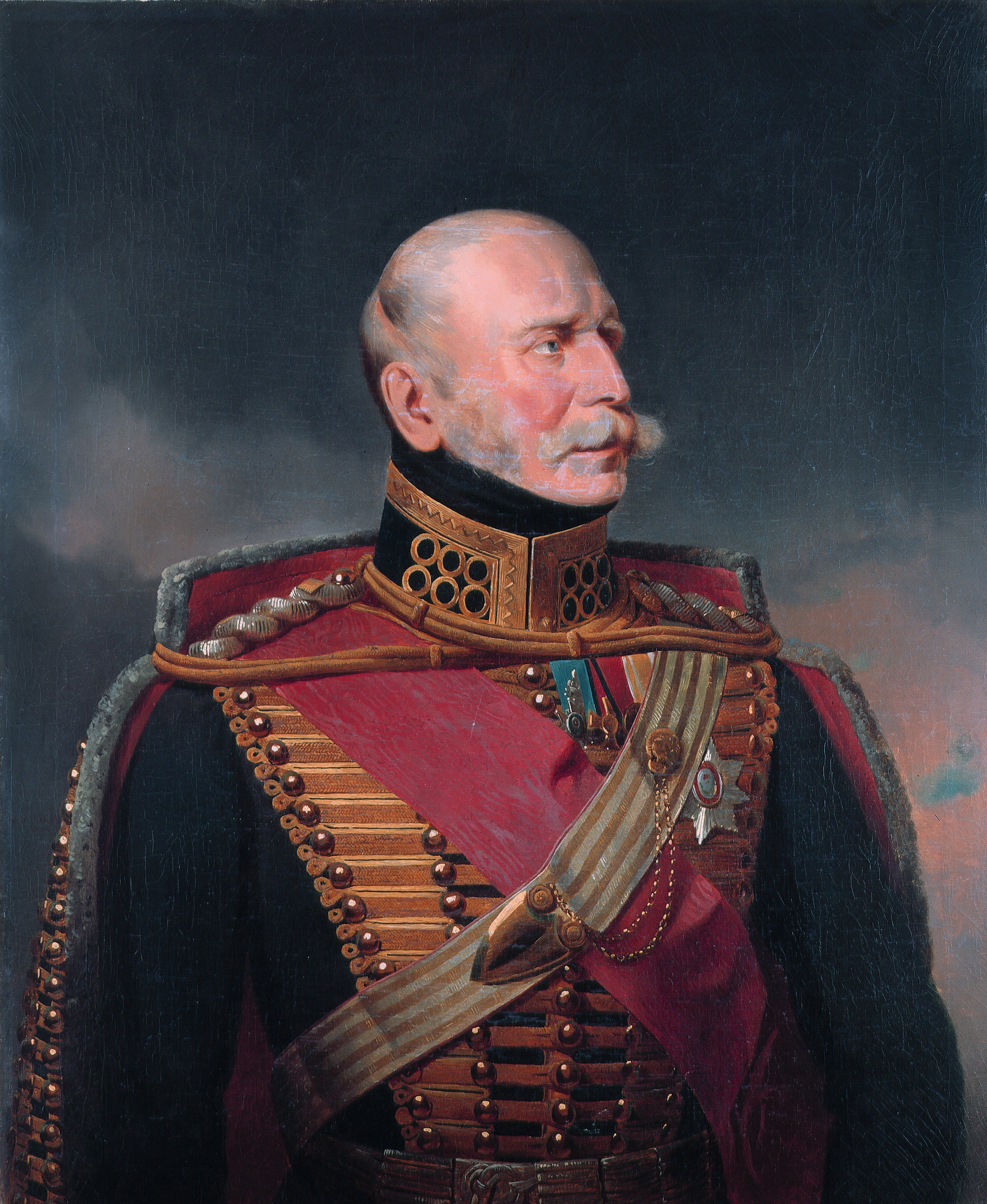
  Ernst August von Hannover
- December 19 – Karl Drais, German inventor (b. 1785)
