= Carlotta (name) =

Carlotta is a Danish, Finnish, German, Italian, Norwegian, Spanish, and Swedish feminine given name and a feminine form of Carlos and Carlo. Notable people with this name include the following:

== Given name ==
- Carlotta (performer) (born 1943), Australian theatre and television personality
- Carlotta, the Lady Aeronaut, professional name of Mary Myers (1849–1932), American professional balloonist
- Carlotta Addison (1849–1914), English actress
- Carlotta Adele Anderson (1876–1956), American educator
- Carlotta Barilli (1935–2020), Italian actress
- Carlotta Berry, American academic in the field of engineering
- Carlotta Brianza (1865–1938), Italian prima ballerina
- Carlotta Brunelli (born 1993), Italian female weightlifter
- Carlotta Cambi (born 1996), Italian volleyball
- Carlotta Case Hall (1880–1949), American botanist
- Carlotta Corpron (1901–1988), American photographer
- Carlotta Dale (c. 1916-1988)), American singer
- Carlotta Dann, New Zealand journalist
- Carlotta de Bevilacqua, Italian architect, designer and entrepreneur
- Carlotta Fedeli (born 1992), Italian racing driver
- Carlotta Ferlito (born 1995), Italian artistic gymnast
- Carlotta Ferrari (1837–1907), Italian composer
- Carlotta Freeman (c. 1877 – 1954), American actress
- Carlotta Gall British journalist and writer for The New York Times
- Carlotta Giovannini (born 1990), Italian artistic gymnast
- Carlotta Grisi (1819–1899), Italian ballet dancer
- Carlotta Ikeda, born Sanae Ikeda, (1941–2014), Japanese dancer
- Carlotta Minna Labowsky, known as Lotte Labowsky (1905–1991), Jewish German classicist
- Carlotta Leclercq (1838–1893), British actress
- Carlotta Loske (born 2007), German sprint canoeist
- Carlotta Maury (1874–1938), American scientist
- Carlotta Maggiorana (born 1992), Italian actress and beauty queen (Miss Italia 2018)
- Carlotta Marchisio (1835–1872), Italian operatic soprano
- Carlotta Mercedes Agnes McCambridge, known as Mercedes McCambridge (1916–2004), American actress
- Carlotta Montanari, Italian film actress and TV host
- Carlotta Monterey, whose birthname was Hazel Neilson Taasinge, (1888–1970), American actress
- Carlotta Monti (1907–1993), film actress and mistress of W. C. Fields
- Carlotta Natoli (born 1971), Italian actress
- Carlotta Nillson (1876–1951), Swedish-born American actress
- Carlotta Nobile (1988–2013), Italian art historian, violinist, writer, and artistic director
- Carlotta Patti (c. 1840 – 1889), Italian operatic soprano
- Carlotta Perry (1839–1914), American poet
- Carlotta Petrina (1901–1997), American illustrator and printer
- Carlotta Ida Popert (1848 – 1923, German-Italian artist
- Carlotta Tagnin (born 1965), Italian swimmer
- Carlotta Thompkins, also known as Lottie Deno (1844–1934), American gambler
- Carlotta Truman (born 1999), German singer-songwriter
- Carlotta Vagnoli (born 1987), Italian feminist activist and author
- Carlotta Valdes (disambiguation)
- Carlotta Walls LaNier (1942), the first black female to graduate from Central High School, Little Rock, Arkansas
- Carlotta Zambelli (1875–1968), Italian ballerina
- Carlotta Zofkova (born 1993), Italian swimmer

== Fictional characters ==
- Carlotta Giudicelli, in the novel and musical The Phantom of the Opera
- Carlotta Vega, in the American soap opera One Life to Live
- Sister Carlotta, in the Ender's Game novel series
- Carlotta, in the 1989 film The Little Mermaid

== See also ==
- Carlotta (disambiguation)
- Carl Otto
- Carlota (name)
- Carlotto (name)
- Charlotta
