= Carlota =

Carlota may refer to:

== People ==
- Carlota (name)

== Places ==
- Carlota Cove, a cove in Antarctica
- Carlota Island, an island in the Philippines
- Lago Carlota National Reserve, in Chile
- Villa Carlota, Mexico, a farming settlement
- Carlota (Mexico), a New Virginia Colony settlement for ex-Confederate soldiers after the American Civil War
- La Carlota (disambiguation)

== Other ==
- Acmaeodera carlota, a beetle species
- Operation Carlota, a Cuban military intervention in Angola during the 1970s
- Carlota, a 1977 children's historical novel by Scott O'Dell

== See also ==
- Carlotta (disambiguation)
