= Carlota (name) =

Carlota is a Catalan, Portuguese, Spanish, and Swedish feminine given name that is an alternate form of Charlotte and a feminine form of Charlot and Carl. Notable people known by this name include the following:

== Given name ==
- Carlota of Mexico, Princess Marie Charlotte Amélie Augustine Victoire Clémentine Léopoldine of Belgium (1840–1927)
- Carlota Alfaro (born 1933), Puerto Rican fashion designer
- Carlota Bustelo (1939–2025), Spanish politician, and feminist
- Carlota Castrejana (born 1973), triple jumper from Spain
- Carlota Ciganda (born 1990), professional golfer from Spain
- Carlota De Camargo Nascimento (Loty) (1904–1974), Brazilian sculptor and poet
- Carlota de Godoy y Borbón, 2nd Duchess of Sueca, Spanish noble
- Carlota Pereira de Queirós (1892–1982), Brazilian feminist and politician
- Carlota Escutia Dotti, Spanish geologist
- Carlota D. EspinoZa (born 1943), American painter
- Carlota Durany (1900–1945), Catalan communist activist
- Carlota Ferreira (1838 – c. 1912), Uruguayan woman
- Carlota Garrido de la Peña (1870–1958), Argentine journalist, writer, teacher
- Carlota Gooden (born 1936), Panamanian sprinter
- Carlota Jaramillo, stage name of María Isabel Carlota Jaramillo, (1904–1987), Ecuadorian singer
- Carlotta Minna Labowsky, known as Lotte Labowsky (1905–1991), Jewish German classicist
- Carlota Joaquina of Spain, Carlota Joaquina Teresa Caetana, Queen consort of Portugal (1775, 1830)
- Carlota Lozano (born 1945), Panamanian beauty queen
- Carlota Lucumí, Carlota (rebel leader) (died 1844), African-born enslaved Cuban woman of Yoruba origin
- Carlota Matienzo (1881–1926), Puerto Rican teacher and feminist
- Carlota O'Neill (1905–2000), Spanish feminist writer and journalist
- Carlota Perez (born 1939), Venezuelan economist
- Carlota Petchamé (born 1990), field hockey player
- Carlota S. Smith (1934–2007), American linguist
- Carlota Sosa (born 1957), Spanish-born Venezuelan actress
- Carlota Ulloa (1944–2021), Chilean hurdling athlete

== Middle name ==
- Princess Maria Luisa Carlota of Parma (1802–1857), Princess of Parma and member of the House of Bourbon

== Fictional ==
- Carlota Casagrande, a character from The Casagrandes
- Carlotta Valdes, a dead person from Vertigo
- Carlotta Montelli, a playable character from Wuthering Waves

== See also ==
- Carlota (disambiguation)
- Carloto
- Carlotta (name)
