= Carlito =

Carlito means "little Carlos". It may refer to:

== Biology ==
- Carlito (genus), a genus of tarsiers
- The Philippine tarsier (Carlito syrichta), the only extant species in the above genus

== People ==
- Carlito (name)
- Carlito (wrestler), a ring name used by professional wrestler, Carlos Edwin Colón Jr.
- Carlito, alias of Jonny Jakobsen

== Other ==
- Carlito (typeface), a typeface released by Google with metrics compatible with Microsoft's Calibri typeface

== See also ==
- Carlitos
- Carloto
- Thiago Carleto
