= Carl Otto =

Carl Otto is a blended given name. Notable people known by this name include the following:

- Carl Otto Bartning (1909–1983), German film editor
- Carl Otto Czeschka (1878–1960), Austrian painter and graphic designer
- Carl Otto Harz (1842–1906), German mycologist, pharmacist and botanist
- Carl Otto Lampland (1873–1951), American astronomer
- Carl Otto Lenz (born 1930), German jurist and politician
- Carl Otto Løvenskiold (1839–1916), Norwegian politician
- Carl Otto Løvenskiold (1898–1969), Norwegian landowner and businessperson
- Carl Otto Løvenskiold (born 1953), Norwegian landowner and businessperson
- Carl Otto Mörner (1781–1868), Swedish courtier
- Carl Otto Nordensvan (1851–1924), Swedish general and military writer
- Carl Otto Reventlow (1817–1873), Danish publisher
- Carl Otto Rosendahl (1875–1956), American botanist
- Carl Otto Svae (1918–1977), Norwegian sailor
- Carl Otto von Eicken (1873–1960), German otorhinolaryngologist
- Carl Otto von Madai (1809–1850), German professor, politician, and statesman

== See also ==
- Carloto
- Carlotta (name)
- Carlotto (name)
- Karl Otto
