= Karl Otto =

Karl Otto or Karl-Otto is a blended given name. Notable people known by this name include the following:

== Given name ==
- Karl-Otto Alberty (born 1933), German actor
- Karl-Otto Apel (1922 – 2017), German philosopher
- Karl Otto Fazer, full name of Karl Fazer (1866 – 1932), Finnish businessman and sport shooter
- Karl Otto Götz (1914 – 2017), German artist
- Karl Otto Hunziker (1841 – 1909), Swiss professor of pedagogy, pastor, and politician
- Karl-Otto Kiepenheuer (1910 – 1975), German astronomer and astrophysicist
- Karl-Otto Koch (1897 – 1945), German SS commander
- Karl Otto Lagerfeld, birthname of Karl Lagerfeld (1933 – 2019), German fashion designer
- Karl Otto Lange (1903 – 1973), German aerospace engineer
- Karl Otto Paetel (1906 – 1975), German political journalist
- Karl Otto Pöhl (1929 – 2014), German economist
- Karl-Otto Saur, Karl Saur (1902 – 1966), German Nazi politician
- Karl Otto Stetter, full name of Karl Stetter (born 1941) German microbiologist
- Karl-Otto Stöhr (born 1942), German mathematician
- Karl Otto Thaning (born 1977), South African actor and swimmer
- Karl Otto Ludwig von Arnim (1779 – 1861), German travel writer
- Karl Otto Georg von Meck (1821 – 1876), German businessman
- Karl Otto Weber (1827 – 1867), German surgeon and pathologist
- Karl Otto Clemens Wittgenstein, full name of Karl Wittgenstein (1847 – 1913), German steel tycoon

== See also ==
- Carl Otto
