= 1861 in Germany =

- Decades: 1840s; 1850s; 1860s; 1870s; 1880s
- See also: Other events of 1861; History of Germany • Timeline • Years

Events from the year 1861 in Germany.

== Incumbents ==
- King of Bavaria – Ludwig II
- King of Hanover – George V
- King of Prussia – Frederick William IV (until 2 Jan) William I (since 2 Jan)
- King of Saxony – John
- King of Württemberg – William I of Württemberg
- Grand Duke of Baden – Frederick I

== Events ==
- 2 January – Frederick William IV of Prussia dies and is succeeded by Wilhelm I.
- 15 April – Watchmaker Junghans is founded.
- 6 June – German Progress Party (Deutsche Fortschrittspartei) is founded as Germany's first modern political party by liberal members of the Prussian House of Representatives in opposition to Bismarck.
- 1 July- Wallraf–Richartz Museum opened in Cologne
- 11 July – German Shooting and Archery Federation is founded in Gotha.
- 14 July – Osckar Becker attempts assassination of William I of Prussia in Baden-Baden.
- 7 August – Allgemeiner Deutscher Musikverein founded by Franz Liszt and Franz Brendel.
- 15 August – First description of Archaeopteryx, based on a feather found in Bavaria; in September the first complete identified skeleton is found near Langenaltheim.
- 1 October – Newspaper Deutsche Allgemeine Zeitung begins daily publication as Nord-deutsche Allgemeine Zeitung.
- Date unknown – Museum Godeffroy in Hamburg is founded.

== Births ==
- 2 January – Wilhelm Bölsche, writer (died 1939)
- 30 January – Charles Martin Loeffler, violist (died 1937 in the United States)
- 4 February – Franz Winter, archaeologist (died 1930)
- 17 February – Princess Helena of Waldeck and Pyrmont, Duchess of Albany, marries into the British royal family (died 1922 in Austria)
- 6 March – Friedrich Eckenfelder, painter (died 1938)
- 21 March – Charles Swickard, silent film director (died 1929 in the United States)
- 14 May – Harro Magnussen, sculptor (died 1908)
- 28 May – Siegfried Czapski, physicist and optician (died 1907)
- 19 June – Ludwig Traube, palaeographer (died 1907)
- 22 June – Maximilian von Spee, admiral (died 1914)
- 16 July – Franz von Blon, composer (died 1945)
- 11 September – Erich von Falkenhayn, general (died 1922)
- 18 September – Walter Schott, sculptor (died 1938)
- 23 September – Robert Bosch, industrialist, engineer and inventor (died 1942)
- 24 September – Walter Simons, lawyer and politician (died 1937)
- 28 September – Wilhelm Diegelmann, actor (died 1934)
- 29 September – Carl Duisberg, chemist and industrialist (died 1935)
- 15 October – Eduard Schmid, politician (died 1933)
- 20 October – Maximilian Harden, journalist (died 1927)
- 10 December
  - Karl Groos, philosopher (died 1946)
  - Elisabeth von Heyking, novelist and travel diarist (died 1925)
- 26 December
  - Friedrich Engel, mathematician (died 1941)
  - Ludolf von Krehl, internist (died 1937)
- 29 December – Kurt Hensel, mathematician (died 1941)

== Deaths ==
- 2 January – Frederick William IV of Prussia, King of Prussia from 1840 to 1861 (born 1795)
- 21 January – Ernst Friedrich August Rietschel, sculptor (born 1804)
- 19 January – Albert Niemann, chemist (born 1834)
- 9 February – Karl Otto Ludwig von Arnim, travel writer and playwright (born 1779)
- 18 February – Theodor Mügge, writer (born 1802)
- 25 October – Friedrich Carl von Savigny, academic lawyer and historian (born 1779)
- 26 November – Wilhelm Hensel, painter (born 1794)
- 1 December – Heinrich August Hahn, theologian (born 1821)
- 18 December – Ernst Anschütz, teacher, organist, poet and composer (born 1780)
