= Carotta =

Carotta (engl. "red house", from venet. ca’ and OIt. rotto) is an Italian surname. Carotta, its plural form Carotte, and the variant Casarotta are also rare toponyms, especially of hamlets and homesteads in northern Italy, for example Fornace Carotta (Fiesso Umbertiano), Carotta (near Quinzano, Verona), and Casarotta (Loro Ciuffenna), but also of regions like Carotte (Pedemonte).

Notable people with the surname Carotta include:

- Gioacchino Carotta (d. 23 April 1556), Italian maestro di cappella and vocalist in the Sistine Chapel
- Francesco Carotta (b. 1946), Italian writer
- Michael Carotta, American author on religion and former director at the NCEA

== See also ==
- Carossa
- Cabianca
- Canova
- Carlotta (disambiguation)
