= Rosemary Woolf =

- Born: 27 December 1925
- Died: 13 April 1978 (aged 52)
- Education: St Hugh's College, Oxford, B. Litt., 1949
- Occupations: Scholar of medieval literature, instructor of English literature
- Organization(s): University College of Hull, Somerville College
- Parent(s): Gladys Capua Woolf and C. M. Woolf

Rosemary Estelle Woolf (27 December 1925 – 13 April 1978) was an English scholar of medieval literature, known especially for her work on medieval English religious lyrics, The English Religious Lyric in the Middle Ages.

== Biography ==
Woolf was the daughter of British film executive C. M. Woolf. She was the first woman in her family to attend university, receiving a B.Litt. from St Hugh's College, Oxford in 1949. She became a lecturer at the University College of Hull in 1948. She became a lecturer in English at Somerville College, Oxford University in 1961, teaching Old and Middle English literature and the history of the English language.

She is commemorated in the Rosemary Woolf Fellowship at Somerville, which was established through a legacy from Lotte Labowsky (1905-1991).
