= Carloto =

Carloto is a name. Notable people with this name include the following:

== Given name ==
- Carloto Cotta (born 1984), Portuguese actor

== Surname ==
- Eduardo Luís Carloto (born 1981), Brazilian footballer

== See also ==
- Carl Otto
- Carlito (disambiguation)
- Carlota (name)
- Carlotto (name)
