= Rüdiger Emshoff =

German oral and maxillofacial surgeon and associate professor

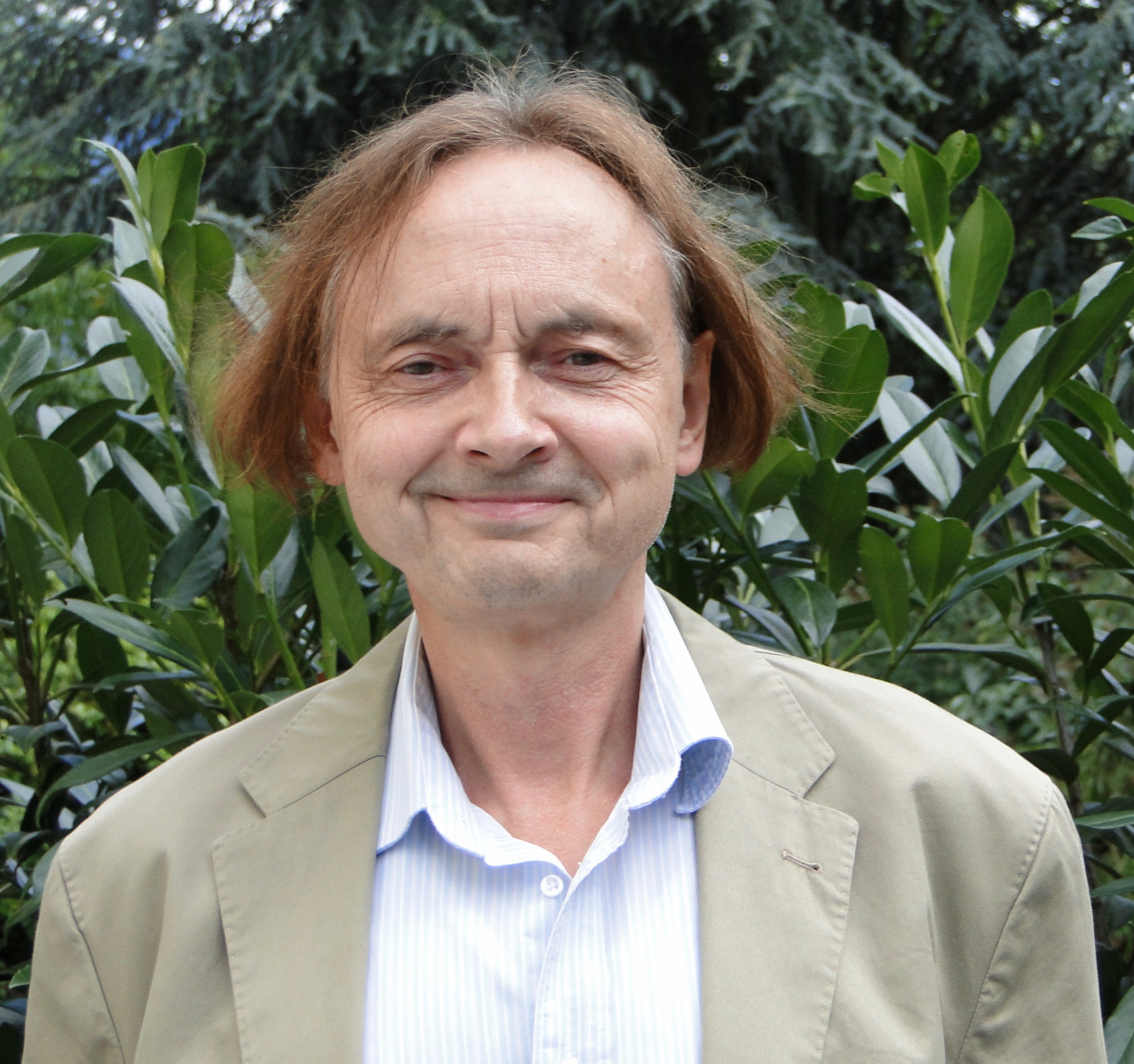
- Emshoff in 2018
- Born: April 5, 1960 (age 66); Mülheim an der Ruhr, Germany
- Occupation: Physician
- Title: Associate professor
- Spouse: Iris Emshoff
- Children: 3

Academic background
- Education: Heinrich-Heine-University (MD) Semmelweis University (DMD)

Academic work
- Discipline: Oral and Maxillofacial Surgery
- Institutions: Medical University of Innsbruck
- Main interests: Chronic orofacial pain Temporomandibular joint dysfunction

Rüdiger Emshoff (born April 5, 1960 in Mülheim an der Ruhr) is a German oral and maxillofacial surgeon and associate professor at the Medical University of Innsbruck, where he is head of the Orofacial Pain and Temporomandibular Disorder Unit. His research focuses on non-invasive and minimally-invasive diagnosis and treatment of temporomandibular joint dysfunction.

== Early life and education ==
Emshoff is the son of Horst Werner and Gisela Sophie-Luise Emshoff of Mülheim an der Ruhr, Germany. Rüdiger Emshoff studied medicine, philosophy and dentistry at the Heinrich-Heine-Universität Düsseldorf and at the Semmelweis-Universität in Budapest. He earned a medical doctorate from the University of Düsseldorf in Germany in 1987. In 1990 he received a dental doctorate from the Semmelweis University in Budapest. Emshoff completed his residency in oral and maxillofacial surgery (1991–1998) at the Medical University of Innsbruck. He is board certified in oral and maxillofacial surgery.

== Scientific career ==
In 2001, Emshoff became an associate professor in oral and maxillofacial surgery at the Medical University of Innsbruck. Since 2001 Emshoff has been a consultant at the University Hospital for Cranio-Maxillofacial and Oral Surgery at the Medical University of Innsbruck. Since 1998 he has been the head of the Orofacial Pain and Temporomandibular Disorder Unit.

== Personal and family ==
Emshoff is married and has three children. Together, the family lives in Innsbruck.

== Clinical research contributions ==
His clinical research focused on the development of rehabilitation methods of treating chronic facial pain. Also he did research on non-invasive imaging techniques to detect internal derangements and degenerative diseases of the temporomandibular joint.

In 1997, he introduced ultrasonography as a new temporomandibular joint imaging modality, a technique used to evaluate the temporomandibular joint.

In the early 2000s, he began using minimally-invasive surgery for certain types of chronic temporomandibular disorder pain.

Since the 2000s, Emshoff and his team have been working on a concept for integrating internal derangements and osteoarthrosis in the diagnostic approach to patients with temporomandibular joint pain. In 2003, Emshoff and colleagues were the first to demonstrate that concomitant morphological abnormalities of disc displacement and osteoarthrosis are not important factors in the pathogenesis of temporomandibular joint pain and dysfunction.

In 2008, Emshoff and coworkers conducted the first human clinical trial of a red low-level laser therapy for temporomandibular joint pain, a rehabilitation method which is currently being used worldwide.

Further, in 2011, he developed a conceptual model for the identification of clinically relevant effects in the field of chronic temporomandibular pain. The model has been used in randomised clinical trials for chronic pain.

== Selected publications ==
Selected publications:

- R. Gassner R, Bösch R, Tuli T, Emshoff R. Prevalence of dental trauma in 6000 patients with facial injuries: implications for prevention. Oral Surgery, Oral Medicine, Oral Pathology, Oral Radiology, and Endodontology. 1999 Jan 1;87(1):27-33. (cited 259 times, according to Google Scholar).
- Emshoff R, Bösch R, Pümpel E, Schöning H, Strobl H. Low-level laser therapy for treatment of temporomandibular joint pain: a double-blind and placebo-controlled trial. Oral Surgery, Oral Medicine, Oral Pathology, Oral Radiology, and Endodontology. 2008 Apr 1;105(4):452-6. (cited 174 times, according to Google Scholar).
- Bertram S, Rudisch A, Innerhofer K, Pümpel E, Grubwieser G, Emshoff R. Diagnosing TMJ internal derangement and osteoarthritis with magnetic resonance imaging. The Journal of the American Dental Association. 2001 Jun 1;132(6):753-61 (cited 155 times, according to Google Scholar).
- Strobl H, Emshoff R, Röthler G. Conservative treatment of unilateral condylar fractures in children: a long‐term clinical and radiologic follow‐up of 55 patients. International Journal of Oral & Maxillofacial Surgery. 1999 Apr;28(2):95-8 (cited 127 times, according to Google Scholar).
- Emshoff R, Bertram S, Rudisch A, Gassner R. The diagnostic value of ultrasonography to determine the temporomandibular joint disk position. Oral Surgery, Oral Medicine, Oral Pathology, Oral Radiology, and Endodontology. 1997 Dec 1;84(6):688-96. (cited 119 times, according to Google Scholar).

== Memberships in scientific organisations ==
He is a member of various professional organizations, including:

- New York Academy of Sciences (NYAS), since 2007.
- Philosophy of Science Association (PSA), since 2007.
- Society for Clinical Trials (SCT), since 2007.
- American Academy of Orofacial Pain (AAOP), since 2012.
- International Association for the Study of Pain (IASP), since 2018.
- American Academy of Craniofacial Pain (AACFP), since 2021.

== Journal editorial positions ==
He has been a member of the editorial board of the journal Case Reports in Medicine, since 2008, Pain and Therapy, since 2018, and Diagnostics, since 2021.

== Honors and awards ==
- Hochschulpreis Endodontologie (Fachzeitschrift Endodontie) (2005).
- Kürschners Deutscher Gelehrten-Kalender (De Gruyter) (2005, 2007, 2009, 2012–2026).
- Sigma Xi Member 2024.
