= Carlette (given name) =

Carlette is a given name that is a variant of Carla. Notable people with the name include:

- Carlette Ewell (born 1971), American boxer
- Carlette Guidry-White (born 1968), American sprinter

== See also ==
- Pamela Charlette
- Carletto
