= Carlotta =

Carlotta may refer to:

== People and fictional characters ==
- Carlotta (name), a list of people and fictional characters with the given name
- Carlotta (performer) (born 1943), Australian cabaret performer and TV personality
- Marguerite Charlotte Lavoie (1912–2005), Canadian dancer known as "Carlotta"
- Mary Myers (1849–1932), American professional balloonist better known as "Carlotta, the Lady Aeronaut"

== Places ==
- Carlotta, California, United States, an unincorporated community
- Villa Carlotta, a house on Lake Como, Italy
- Villa Carlotta (Altadena), a house in Altadena, California
- Villa Carlotta (Hollywood), an apartment building in Hollywood, Los Angeles, California
- Carlotta, Western Australia, a locality of the Shire of Nannup

== Ships ==
- French brig Carlotta (1807), captured by the British in 1810 and redesignated HMS Carlotta
- HMS Carlotta (1812), the French brig Pylades, captured by the British and renamed Carlotta after the wreck of the earlier Carlotta
- SS Carlotta, later name of USS Antona (1863)
- TSS Carlotta (1893), British passenger vessel
- USS Carlotta (SP-1785), a United States Navy patrol boat in service from 1917 to 1918

== Other uses ==
- List of storms named Carlotta, various tropical cyclones
- A fictional town in the 1949 film noir The Bribe
- A fictional town in the 1982 comedy film Dead Men Don't Wear Plaid

== See also ==
- Carlota (disambiguation)
- Carotta (disambiguation)
- Charlotta
- Charlotte (disambiguation)
