= 1859 in Germany =

- Decades: 1830s; 1840s; 1850s; 1860s; 1870s
- See also: Other events of 1859; History of Germany • Timeline • Years

Events from the year 1859 in Germany.

== Incumbents ==
- King of Bavaria – Maximilian II
- King of Hanover – George V
- King of Prussia – Frederick William IV
- King of Saxony – John of Saxony

== Events ==
- 4 February – German scholar Constantin von Tischendorf rediscovers the Codex Sinaiticus, a 4th-century uncial manuscript of the Greek Bible, in Saint Catherine's Monastery on the foot of Mount Sinai, in the Khedivate of Egypt.

== Births ==
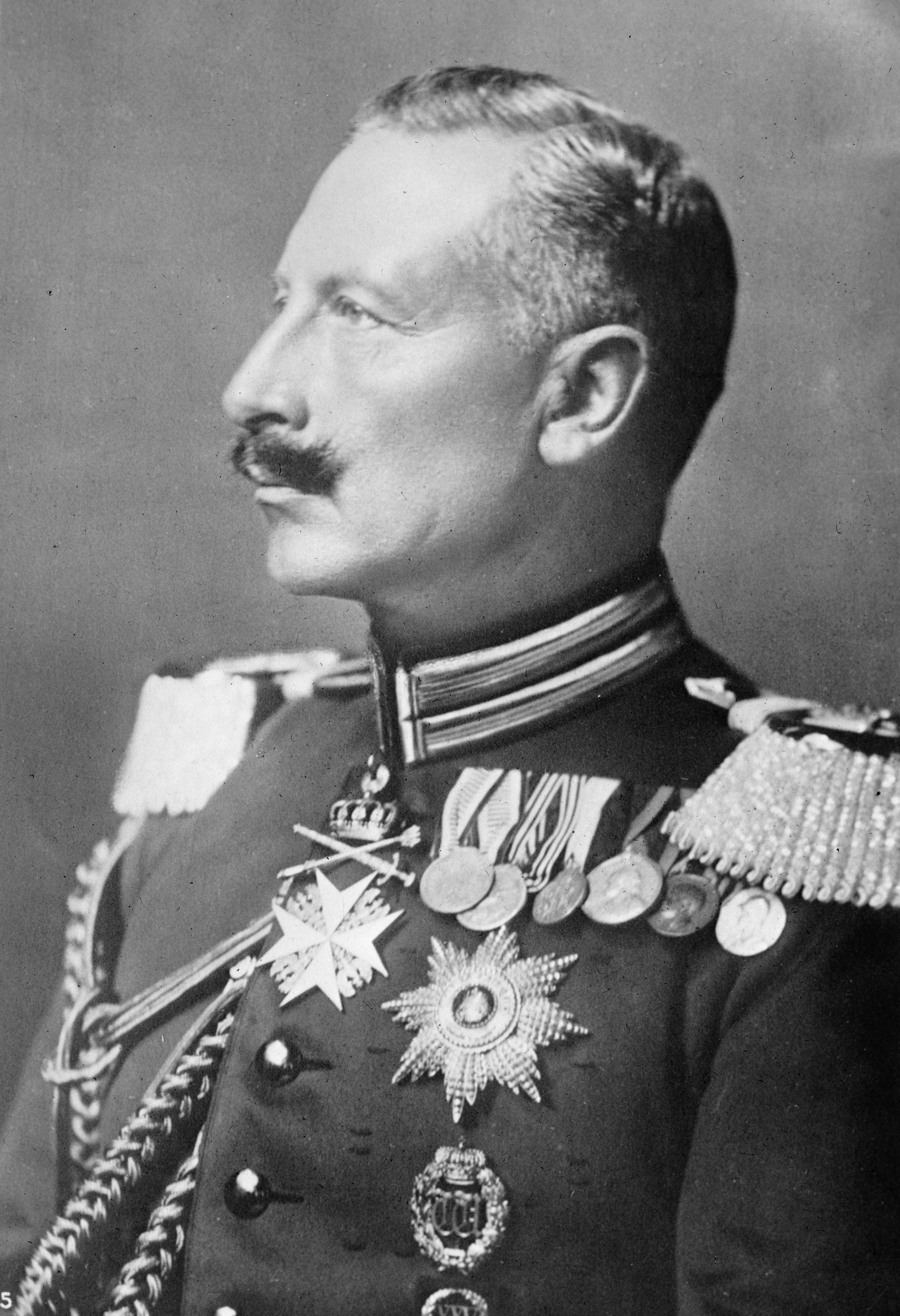
Wilhelm II

- 27 January – Wilhelm II, last Emperor of Germany and King of Prussia (d. 1941 )
- 3 February – Hugo Junkers, German industrialist, aircraft designer (d. 1935)
- 7 April – Jacques Loeb, German–American physiologist, biologist (d. 1924)
- 25 December – Ludwig von Estorff, German general (d. 1943 )

== Deaths ==
- 20 January – Bettina von Arnim, composer and author (born 1785)
- 6 May – Alexander von Humboldt, German naturalist and geographer (b. 1769)

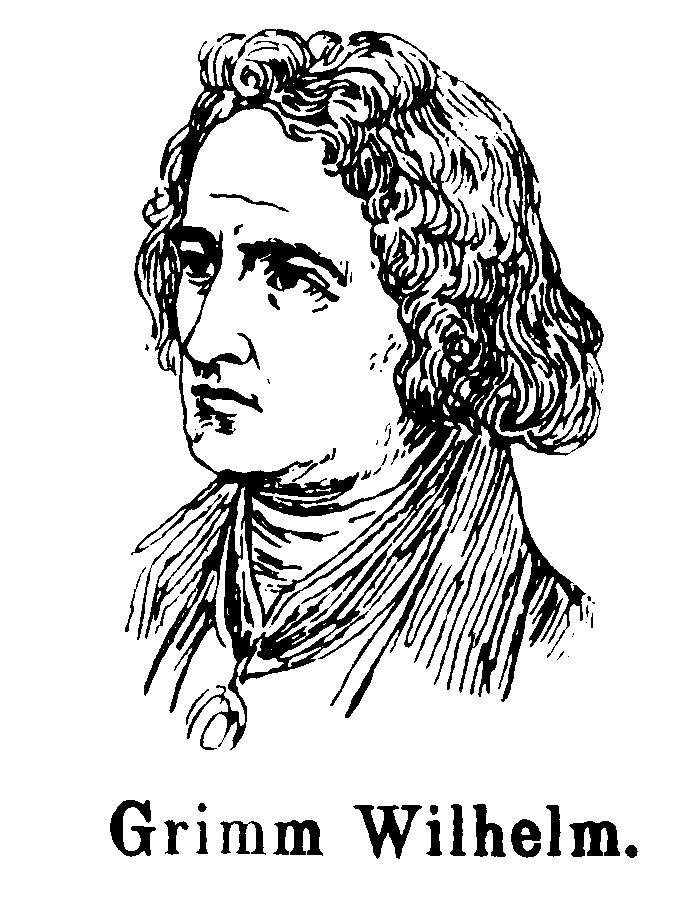
Wilhelm Grimm

- 8 July – Charlotte von Siebold, German gynecologist (b. 1788 )
- 28 September – Carl Ritter, German geographer (b. 1779)
- 4 October – Karl Baedeker, German author, publisher (b. 1801)
- 22 October – Louis Spohr, German violinist, composer (b. 1784)
- 16 December – Wilhelm Grimm, German philologist, folklorist (b. 1786)
