= C. M. Woolf =

British film producer

- Born: Charles Moss Woolf; 10 July 1879; London, England
- Died: 31 December 1942 (aged 63); London, England
- Employer(s): Gaumont British Picture Corporation, General Film Distributors
- Known for: Distributing some of Alfred Hitchcock's first films
- Spouse(s): Second wife, Gladys Capua Woolf
- Children: John and James Woolf, Rosemary Woolf
- Relatives: Eight brothers and sisters

Charles Moss Woolf (10 July 1879 – 31 December 1942) was a British film distributor.

== Biography ==
Woolf made a fortune by financing, distributing and exhibiting films after World War I, including some of Alfred Hitchcock's first films. In 1935 he resigned from the Gaumont British Picture Corporation and formed General Film Distributors. He brought J. Arthur Rank into the film industry.

He was the father of producers John and James Woolf, and of Rosemary Woolf, a scholar of medieval literature.

Michael Balcon called him "an extraordinary man—a high-tension man, capable of great charm-and generosity but also having the capacity to reduce strong men to tears. He was known throughout the film world as ‘C.M.’ and regarded generally with a mixture of awe and affection... not a maker of films in any sense of the word; he rarely visited the studios, but he knew about the end product and had an unparalleled talent for film business—without doubt the shrewdest film salesman of his time."

== Selected filmography ==
- The Lodger: A Story of the London Fog (1927)
- The Vortex (1927)
- Easy Virtue (1928)
- The First Born (1928)
- The Return of the Rat (1929)
- No Monkey Business (1935)
- When Knights Were Bold (1936)
