= Mülheim =

Mülheim an der Ruhr
- City
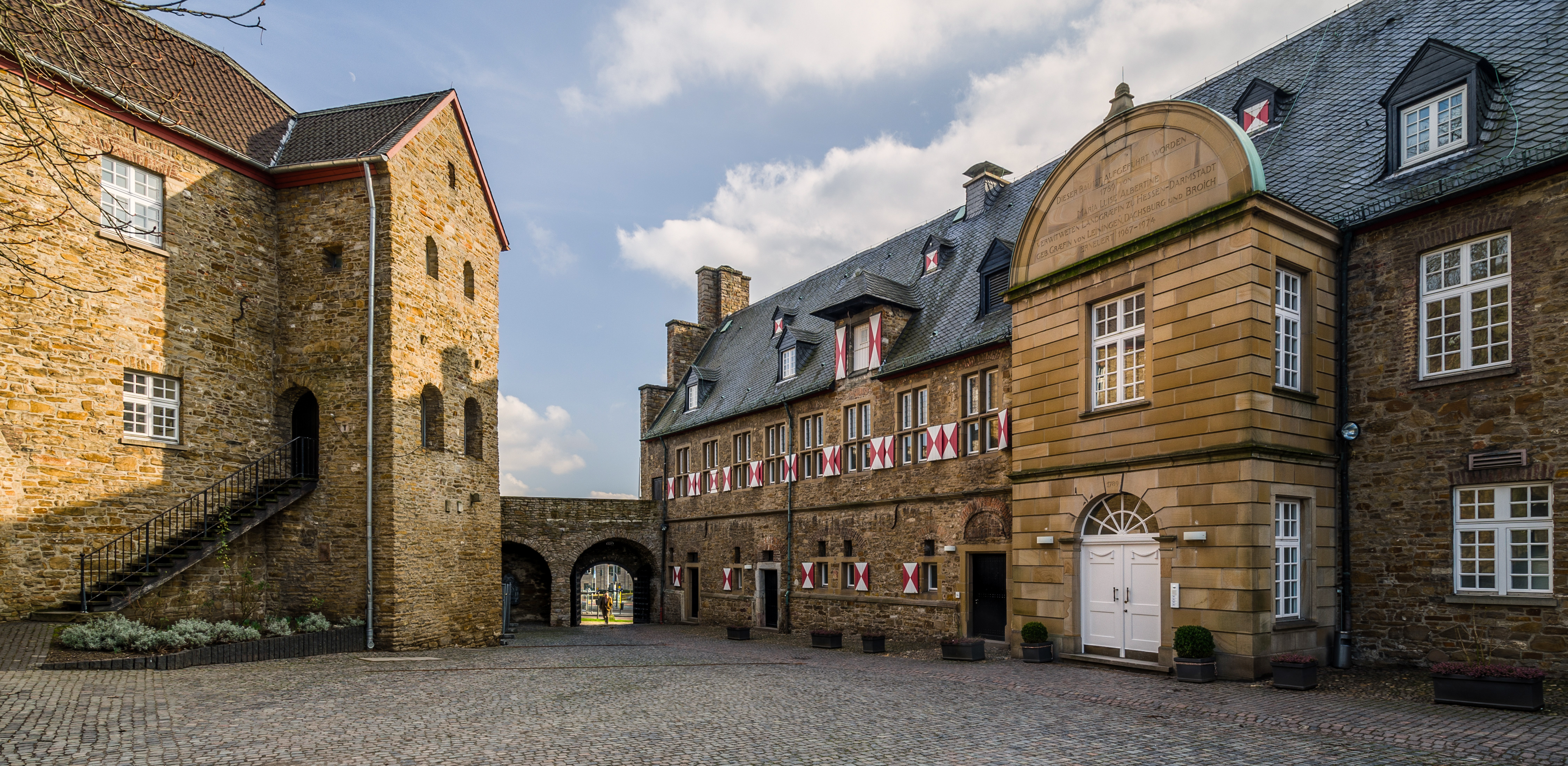
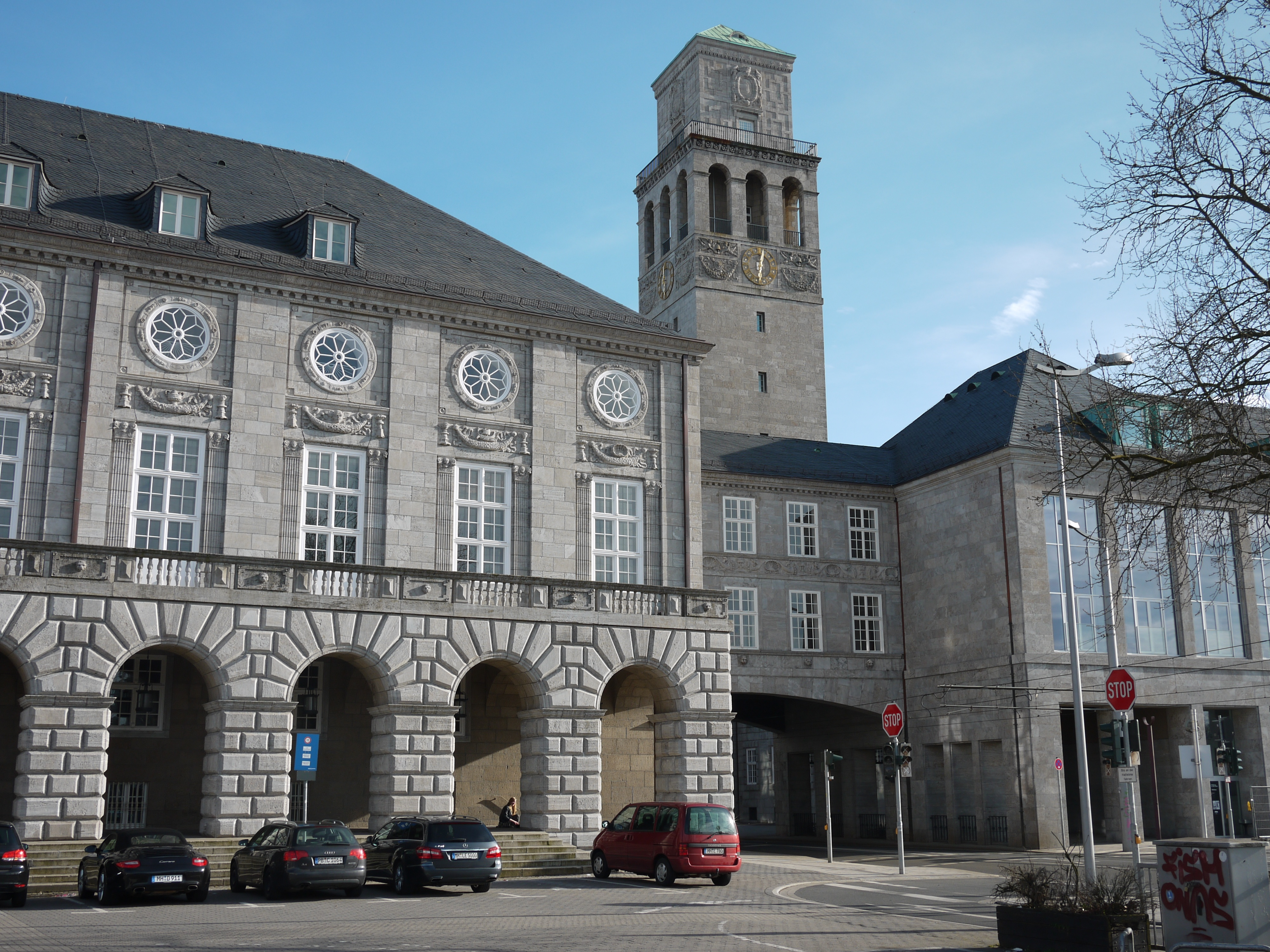
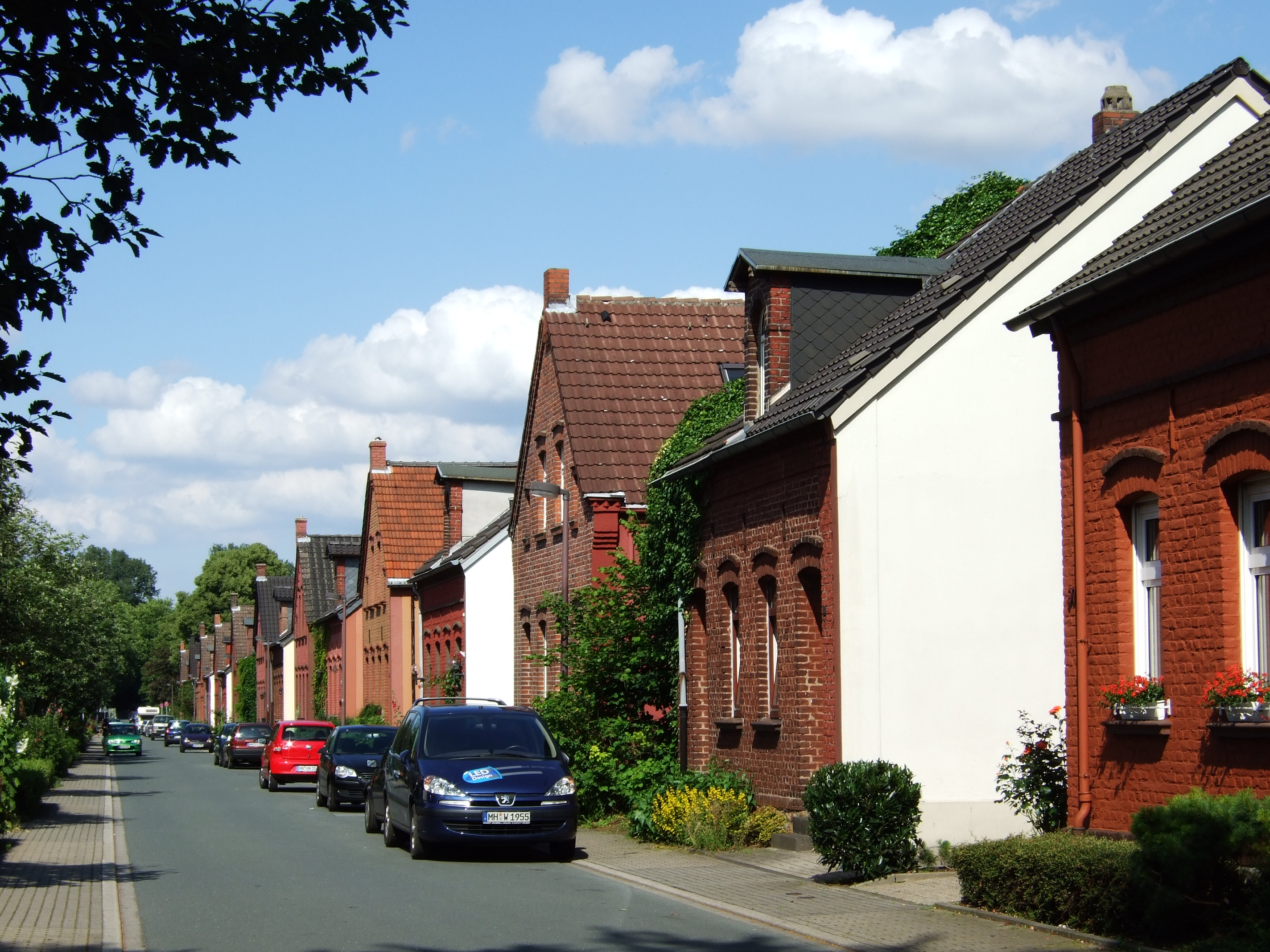
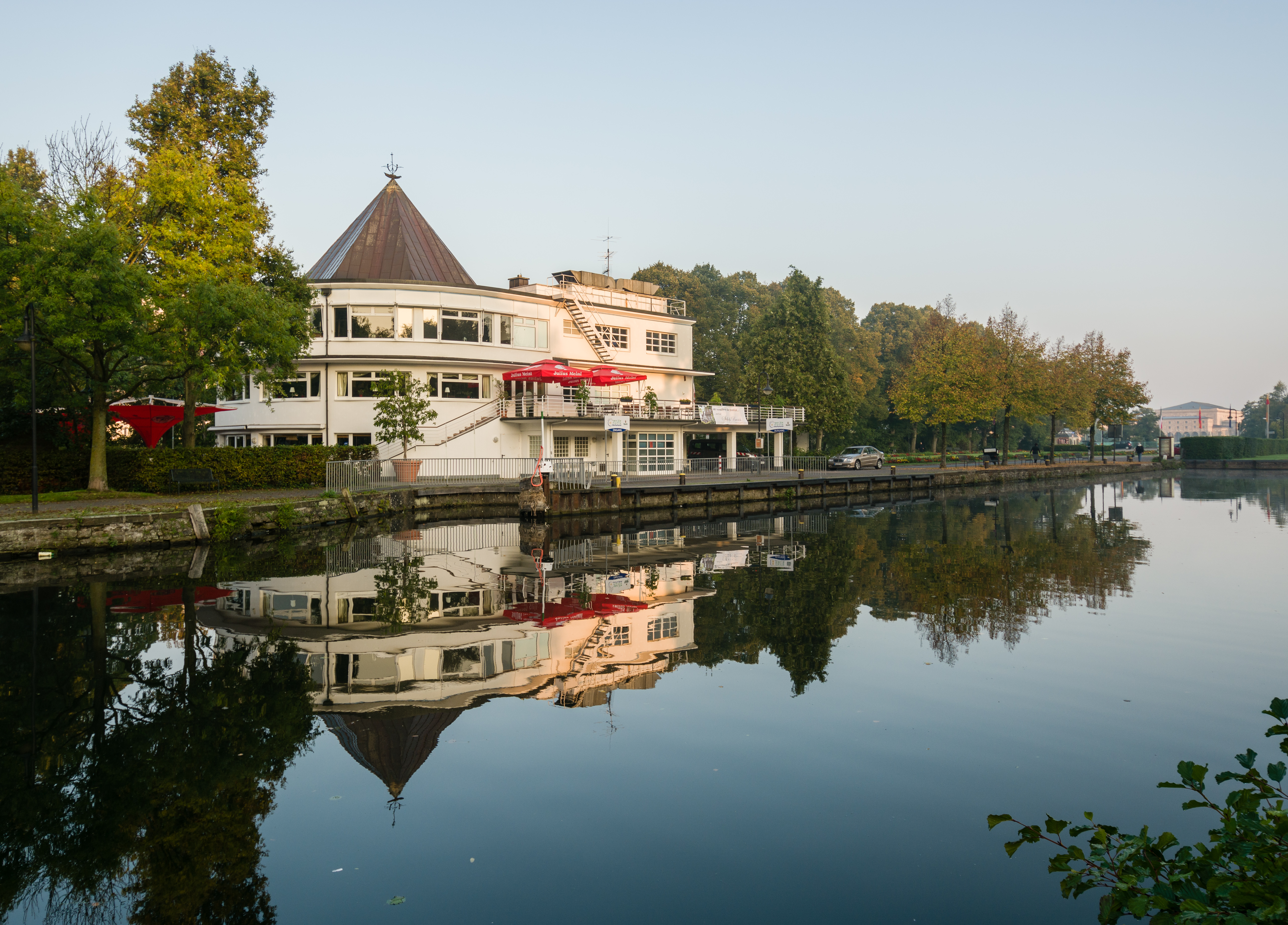
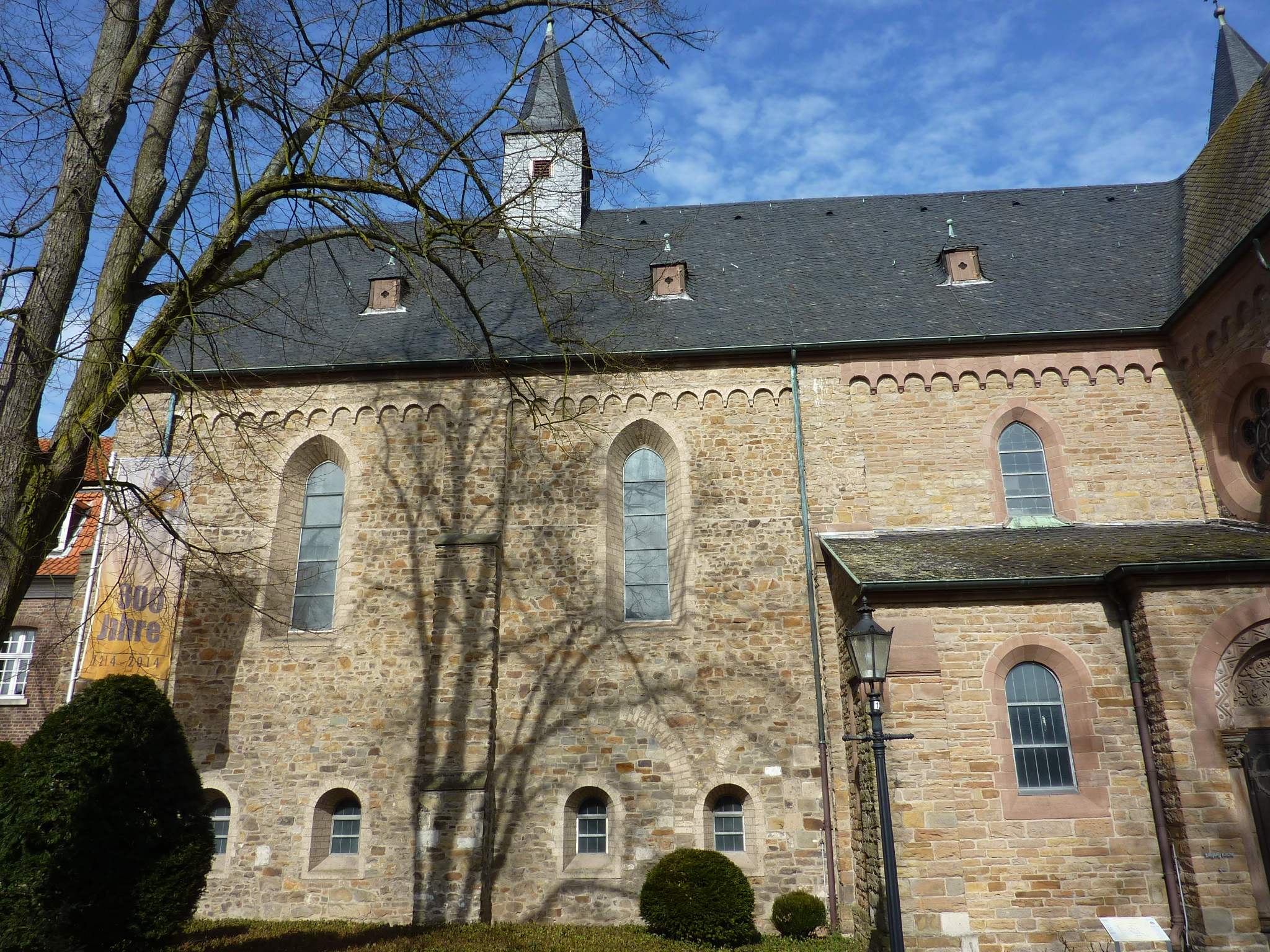
- Broich Castle Town Hall Mausegatt Wasserbahnhof Saarn Closter

- Flag Coat of arms

- Location of Mülheim an der Ruhr within North Rhine-Westphalia
- Interactive map of Mülheim an der Ruhr
- Location within Germany Location within North Rhine-Westphalia
- Coordinates: 51°25′39″N 06°52′57″E
- Country: Germany
- State: North Rhine-Westphalia
- Admin. region: Düsseldorf
- District: Urban district
- Subdivisions: 3 districts, 9 boroughs

Government
  - Mayor (2020–25): Marc Buchholz (CDU)

Area
  - Total: 91.28 km^{2} (35.24 sq mi)
- Elevation: 26–153 m (85–502 ft)

Population (2025-12-31)
  - Total: 171,674
  - Density: 1,881/km^{2} (4,871/sq mi)
- Time zone: UTC+01:00 (CET)
  - Summer (DST): UTC+02:00 (CEST)
- Postal codes: 45468–45481
- Dialling codes: 0208, 02054
- Vehicle registration: MH
- Website: www.muelheim-ruhr.de

Mülheim, officially Mülheim an der Ruhr (German: [ˈmyːlhaɪm ʔan deːɐ̯ ˈʁuːɐ̯], lit. 'Mülheim on the Ruhr'; Low German: Mölm; Kölsch: Müllem) and also described as "City on the River", is a city in North Rhine-Westphalia in western Germany. It is located in the Ruhr Area between Duisburg, Essen, Oberhausen and Ratingen. It is home to many companies, and two Max Planck Institutes.

Mülheim an der Ruhr was granted city rights in 1808, and a century later its population surpassed 100,000, officially making it a major city.

== Geography ==
Mülheim an der Ruhr is located to the southwest of Essen in the Ruhr valley. The city consists of 19 districts, 14 of which are located on the right bank of the Ruhr and 5 on the left bank.

Districts of Mülheim an der Ruhr
Right bank of the Ruhr	Population
Innenstadt (City Centre)³	24000
Dümpten	18800
Styrum	16200
Eppinghofen¹	12500
Mellinghofen¹	11000
Holthausen	10800
Heißen	10000
Heimaterde²	6300
Winkhausen	5000
Raadt	1700
Menden	1200
Ickten	200
Left bank of the Ruhr	Population
Saarn	20500
Speldorf	18900
Broich	14200
Selbeck	1800
Mintard	700

¹ Eppinghofen and Mellinghofen are part of the northern inner city (referred to as Altstadt II).

² The old name for Heimaterde in the land register is Fulerum.

³ officially referred to as Altstadt I.

Figures are estimates based on statistical data from 2025.

The city is divided into three administrative districts (Bezirke), six sub-areas (Teilräume) for planning purposes, and nine (official) districts and 28 statistical districts. There are 27 electoral districts for local elections.

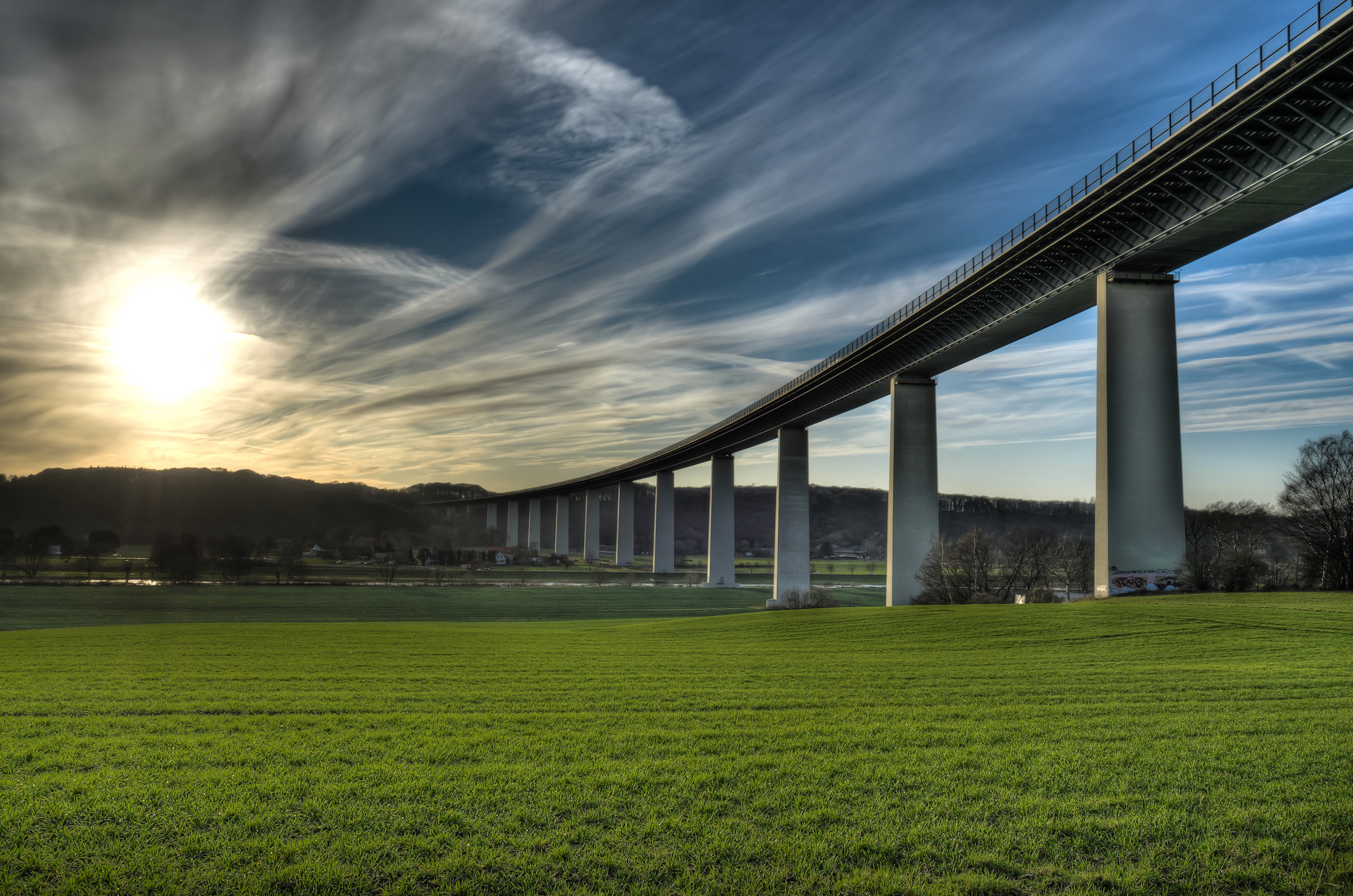
The bridge Mintarder Ruhrtalbrücke in Mülheim, crosses the Ruhr connecting Düsseldorf and Essen

=== Geology ===
The northern foothills of the Rhenish Massif are characterised by the distinctive rock formation of the bare mountain slopes through which run coal-bearing layers which formed during the carboniferous period. Here the Ruhr cuts more than 50 meters deep into this Mittelgebirge. This natural erosion partly uncovered these mineable black coal deposits, which enabled their exploration and extraction using adits. However, the coal-rich layers became ever deeper as one progressed northward, which required setting up mines to extract the black coal. In contrast, the broad bayou (dead arm of a river) of Styrum borough is characteristic of the features of the Lower Rhine Plain.

== Demographics ==
Historical population

Year	Pop.	±% p.a.
1965	191,769	—
1970	192,788	+0.11%
1975	189,262	−0.37%
1980	181,280	−0.86%
1985	171,967	−1.05%
1990	177,681	+0.66%
1995	176,530	−0.13%

Year	Pop.	±% p.a.
2000	172,862	−0.42%
2005	169,917	−0.34%
2010	167,344	−0.30%
2015	169,278	+0.23%
2020	170,921	+0.19%
2025	171,674	+0.09%

Population size may be affected by changes in administrative divisions. Source: Landesdatabank Nordrhein-Westfalen

Rank	Nationality	Population (31.12.2022)
1	Turkey	4,807
2	Syria	2,910
3	Serbia	1,594
4	Iraq	1,423
5	Poland	1,357
6	Ukraine	1,306
7	Romania	1,243
8	Italy	1,149
9	China	1,017
10	Kosovo	964

== History ==
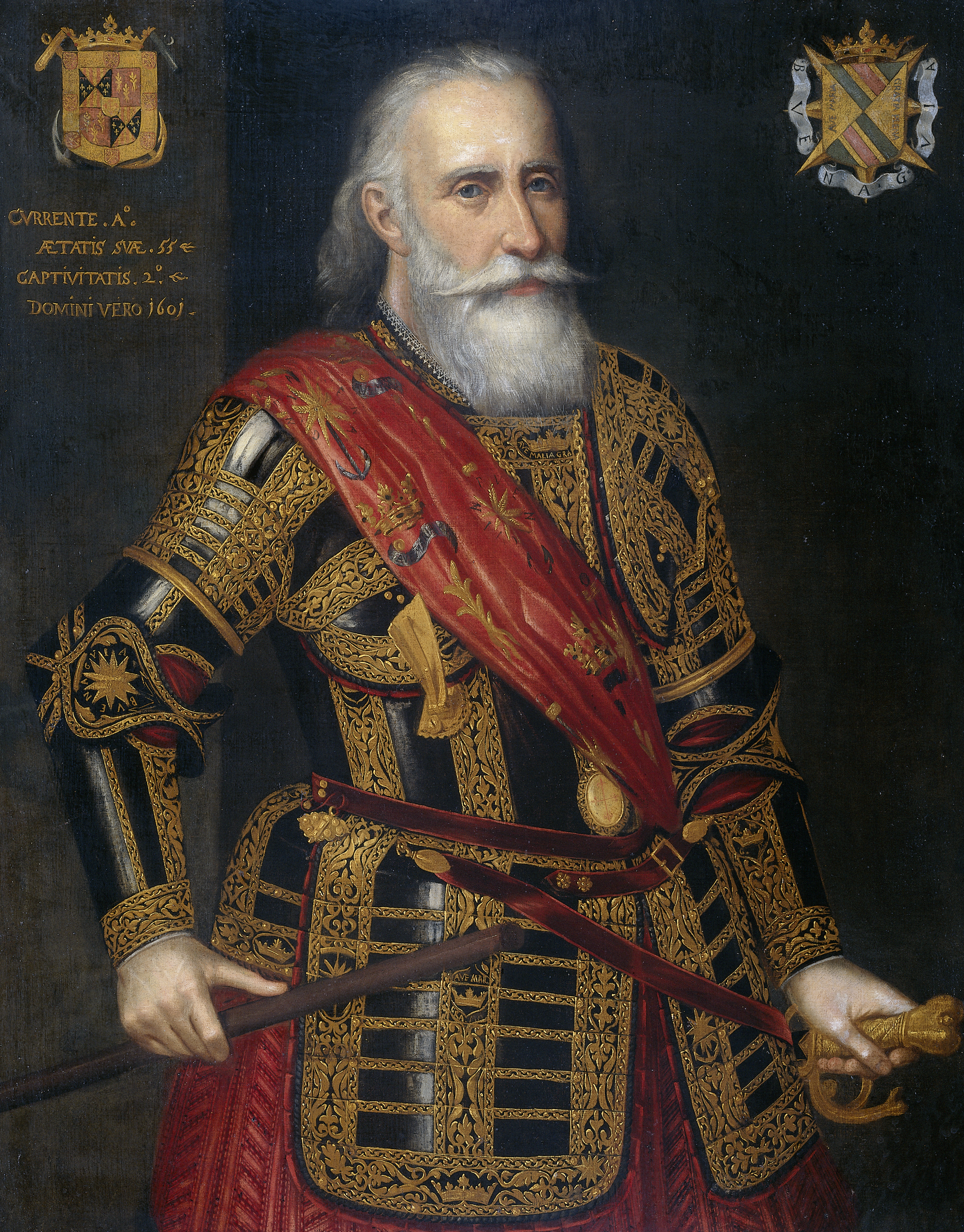
Francisco Lopez de Mendoza (1546-1623)

Mülheim was first mentioned in 1093, associated with the lords of Broich, whose castle still overlooks the city. In 1598, the castle and town were occupied by Spanish troops led by Francisco López de Mendoza y Mendoza and again taken by Ambrosia Spínola in October 1605. In February 1609, its occupation was handed to the United Provinces of the Netherlands. Where it was given back to its lord, Juan Adolfo de Daun.

In 1614, during the crisis of the Juliers-Cleveris succession, it was occupied again by the Spanish troops led by Ambrosia Spinola. He destroyed the city's walls to prevent it from being used as a fortress by the Protestants.

In 1682, the town was inherited by the Leiningen family.

It later was annexed by the Duchy of Berg in 1806, which passed it to Prussia in 1814.

Mülheim was chartered in 1808. Between 1878 and 1929, Mülheim absorbed its neighboring towns, including Broich and Heissen. Later, during World War II, forced laborers of the 3rd SS construction brigade were dispatched in the town by the Nazis in 1943.

In 1993, the city was laureate together with Bocholt with the Europe Prize.

== Transport ==
The U18 metro line connects the city with Essen.

The U79 metro line connects the city with Duisburg.

The nearest airport is Düsseldorf Airport, located 30 km (19 mi) south west of Mülheim. Mülheim also shares an Airfield with Essen.

== Politics ==
=== Mayor ===
The current mayor of Mülheim is Marc Buchholz of the Christian Democratic Union (CDU) since 2020. The most recent mayoral election was held on 14 September 2025, with a runoff held on 28 September. Following results are from 2020:

Candidate	Party	First round		Second round	
Candidate	Party	Votes	%	Votes	%
Marc Buchholz	Christian Democratic Union	16,479	25.4	27,716	56.9
Monika Griefahn	Social Democratic Party	16,385	25.3	20,984	43.1
Wilhelm Steitz	Alliance 90/The Greens	10,178	15.7		
Horst Bilo	Independent	5,394	8.3		
Jürgen Abeln	Independent	4,907	7.6		
Andreas Brings	Die PARTEI	3,940	6.1		
Alexander von Wrese	Alternative for Germany	3,920	6.0		
Amrei Debatin	Free Democratic Party	1,853	2.9		
Jochen Dirk Hartmann	Independent	945	1.5		
Martin Ulrich Fritz	Civic Awakening Mülheim	808	1.2		
Valid votes		64,809	98.7	48,700	98.6
Invalid votes		879	1.3	679	1.4
Total		65,688	100.0	49,379	100.0
Electorate/voter turnout		130,571	50.3	130,561	37.8
Source: State Returning Officer

=== City council ===
Results of the 2020 city council election

The Mülheim city council governs the city alongside the mayor. The most recent city council election was held on 13 September 2020, and the results were as follows:

Party	Votes	%	±	Seats	±
Christian Democratic Union (CDU)	16,970	26.3	▼0.9	14	▼1
Alliance 90/The Greens (Grüne)	15,097	23.4	▲12.4	13	▲7
Social Democratic Party (SPD)	13,765	21.3	▼10.2	12	▼5
Alternative for Germany (AfD)	4,629	7.2	▲1.9	4	▲1
Mülheimer Citizens' Initiative (MBI)	3,043	4.7	▼5.4	3	▼2
Free Democratic Party (FDP)	3,003	4.7	▼0.7	3	±0
Die PARTEI (PARTEI)	2,866	4.4	New	2	New
The Left (Die Linke)	1,751	2.7	▼1.4	1	▼1
We From Mülheim (WIR)	1,560	2.4	▲1.0	1	±0
Civic Awakening Mülheim (BAMH)	1,173	1.8	New	1	New
Alliance for Education (BüfBi)	424	0.7	▼0.3	0	▼1
Independents	226	0.4	–	0	–
Valid votes	64,507	98.3			
Invalid votes	1,144	1.7			
Total	65,651	100.0		54	±0
Electorate/voter turnout	130,571	50.3	0.0		
Source: State Returning Officer

== Education and research ==
Mülheim is home to two Max Planck Institutes, a university campus, and various other educational and scientific institutions.

- Max Planck Institute for Coal Research
- Max Planck Institute for Chemical Energy Conversion
- Ruhr West University of Applied Sciences, main campus
- IWW Water Centre, water research institute of the University of Duisburg-Essen
- 39 Schools, among them 22 primary schools, 12 general secondary schools, 2 vocational schools, 1 Waldorf school, and 2 special schools

== Economy ==
Mülheim an der Ruhr has a longstanding industrial heritage as part of the Ruhrgebiet, historically focused on coal mining, steel, and chemicals. While heavy industry has declined, the city has shifted towards logistics, retail, scientific research, and high-value services.

Mülheim has developed as a local logistics and services center within North Rhine-Westphalia, supported by its proximity to Düsseldorf, Essen, and the Rhine-Ruhr metropolitan region’s transport infrastructure. The local economy includes a developed retail sector and elements of food distribution, along with growing activity in energy and environmental sciences, partly driven by the presence of research institutions such as the Max Planck Institutes and Ruhr West University of Applied Sciences.

== Companies ==
- Siemens Energy (founded 2020), an energy technology company, is the largest employer in Mülheim
- Aldi Süd (founded 1946, split in two parts in 1960, renamed to Aldi Süd in 1962), a discount supermarket chain, has its corporate headquarters in Mülheim
- PVS rhein-ruhr (founded in 1927) handles billing for the healthcare sector
- Europipe GmbH (founded 1991), Europipe produces large seamless pipes for oil and gas pipelines, including Nord Stream
- At ThyssenKrupp Presta, steering systems for the automotive industry are assembled
- Harke Group, formerly Syntana (founded 1965), wholesaler for chemicals

== Sports clubs ==
- 1. FC Mülheim (founded 1923), a football club. The club from the working-class district of Styrum district celebrated its greatest success with promotion to the 2. Bundesliga (Nord) in 1974, where they played for two seasons.
- VfB Speldorf (founded 1919), a football club. The VfB's greatest success was winning the Niederrheinpokal in 2009
- HTC Uhlenhorst Mülheim (founded 1920), a field hockey club

== Twin towns – sister cities ==
Mülheim is twinned with:

- Darlington, United Kingdom (1953)
- Tours, France (1962)
- Opole, Poland (1989)
- Kfar Saba, Israel (1993)
- Beykoz, Turkey (2007)
- Kouvola, Finland (2009)

== Notable people ==
- William Rittenhouse (1644–1708), founder of the first paper mill in North America
- Gerhard Tersteegen (1697–1769), Reformed religious writer
- Carl Arnold Kortum (1745–1824), physician, writer and poet
- August Bungert (1845–1915), opera composer and poet
- Wilibald Nagel (1863–1929), musicologist
- Hugo Stinnes (1870–1924), industrialist and founder of the German People's Party
- Fritz Thyssen (1873–1951), industrialist associated with the Nazi Party
- Carl Otto von Eicken (1873–1960), otorhinolaryngologist
- Heinrich Thyssen (1875–1947), German-Hungarian entrepreneur and art collector
- Arthur Kaufmann (1888–1971), painter
- Walter Hartmann (1891–1977), general of artillery in World War II
- Dagmar Mühlenfeld (born 1951), mayor of Mülheim an der Ruhr
- Otto Pankok (1893–1966), painter, printmaker and sculptor
- Otto Roelen (1897–1993), chemist
- Karl Ziegler (1898–1973), chemist, Nobel Prize winner
- Clärenore Stinnes (1901–1990), car racer, the first person to circumnavigate the world by automobile
- Werner Best (1903–1989), jurist, police chief and Nazi leader
- Carl Balhaus (1905–1968), actor and director
- Karl Thurmann (1909–1943), Korvettenkapitän, Knights Cross of the Iron Cross
- Ferdinand aus der Fünten (1909–1989), SS-Hauptsturmführer, war criminal
- Fritz Buchloh (1909–1998), footballer
- Günther Smend (1912–1944), officer and a resistance fighter involved in the 20 July Plot to assassinate Adolf Hitler
- Karl Albrecht (1920–2014), entrepreneur
- Theo Albrecht (1922–2010), entrepreneur
- Wilhelm Knabe (1923–2021), ecologist, pacifist, civil servant and politician
- Wim Thoelke (1927–1995), TV entertainer
- Hermann Bottenbruch (1928–2019), mathematician and computer scientist
- Jürgen Sundermann (born 1940), football player and manager
- Hans Walitza (born 1945), football player and manager
- Rudolf Seliger (born 1951), footballer
- Bodo Hombach (born 1952), politician
- Monika Griefahn (born 1954), politician
- Hans-Günter Bruns (born 1954), footballer
- Helge Schneider (born 1955), comedian, musician, author, film and theatre director and actor
- Ralph Morgenstern (born 1956), television presenter and actor
- Albrecht von Croÿ (born 1958), journalist
- Ulla Kock am Brink (born 1961), television presenter
- Hannelore Kraft (born 1961), politician, Minister-President of North Rhine-Westphalia
- Ralf Lübke (born 1965), athlete
- Carolin Emcke (born 1967), journalist
- Willi Landgraf (born 1968), footballer
- Sven Meinhardt (born 1971), field hockey player, Olympic winner
- André Lenz (born 1973), footballer
- Lars Burgsmüller (born 1975), tennis player
- Marion Rodewald (born 1976), field hockey player, Olympic winner
- Kai Gehring (born 1977), politician
- Felix Erdmann (born 1978), rowing cox
- Simone Hanselmann (born 1979), actress
- Salih Altın (born 1987), footballer
- Bobby Gunns (born 1992), professional wrestler
- Jonathan Rommelmann (born 1994), rower, Olympic medalist
- Stephanie Stebich (born 1966), art historian
- Rüdiger Emshoff (born 1960), maxillofacial surgeon and associate professor
- Karl Schmitz-Scholl (1868-1933), businessman

== Gallery ==
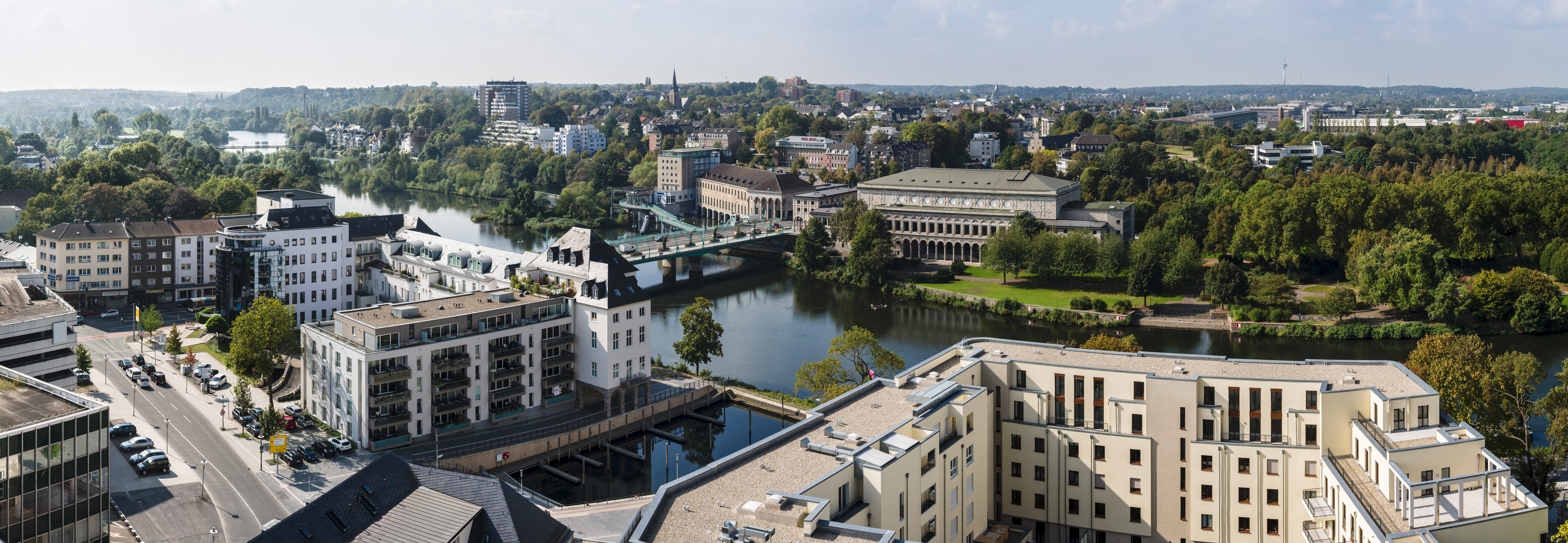
Panorama of Mülheim in 2014
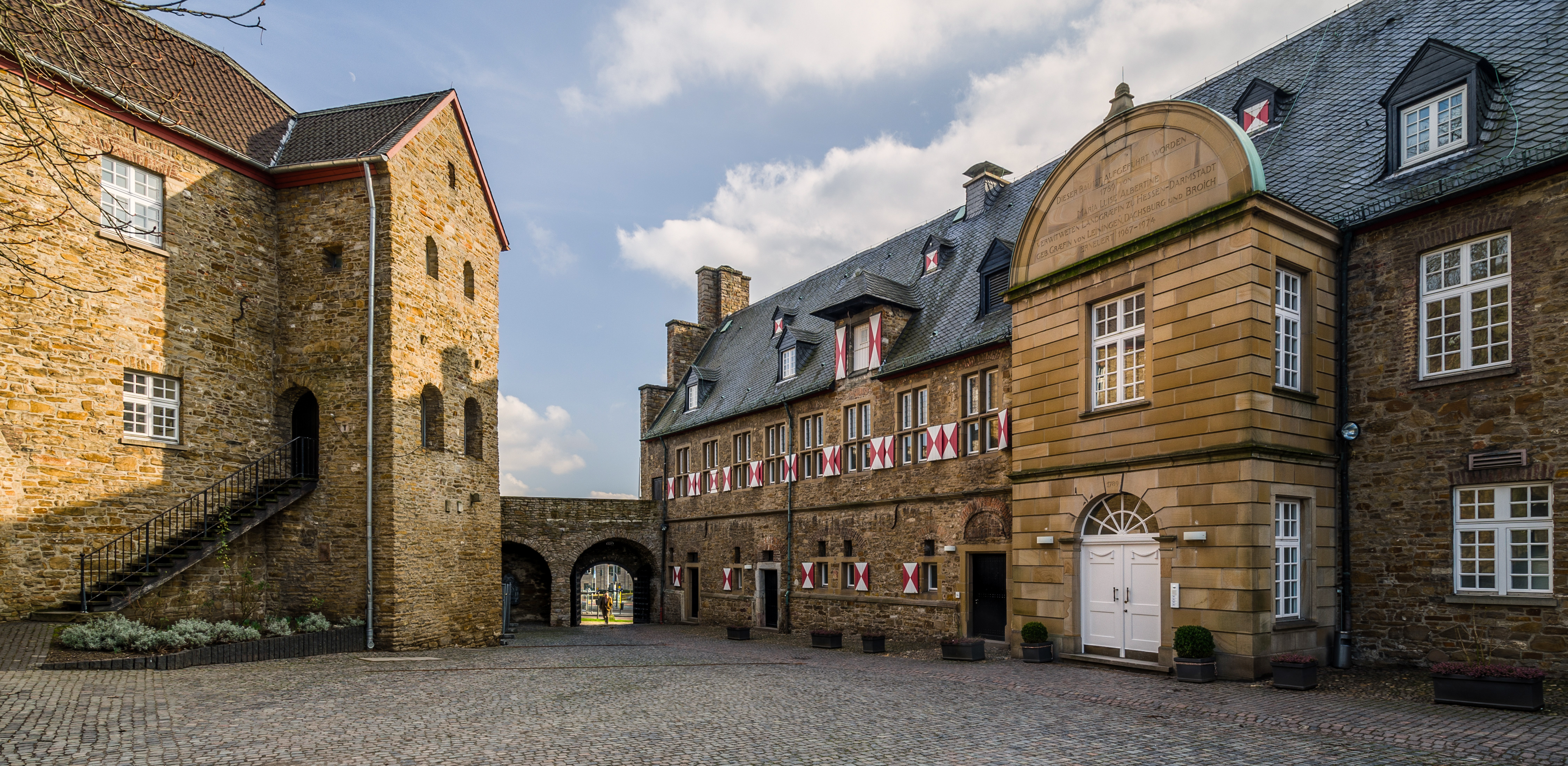
Courtyard of Schloss Broich

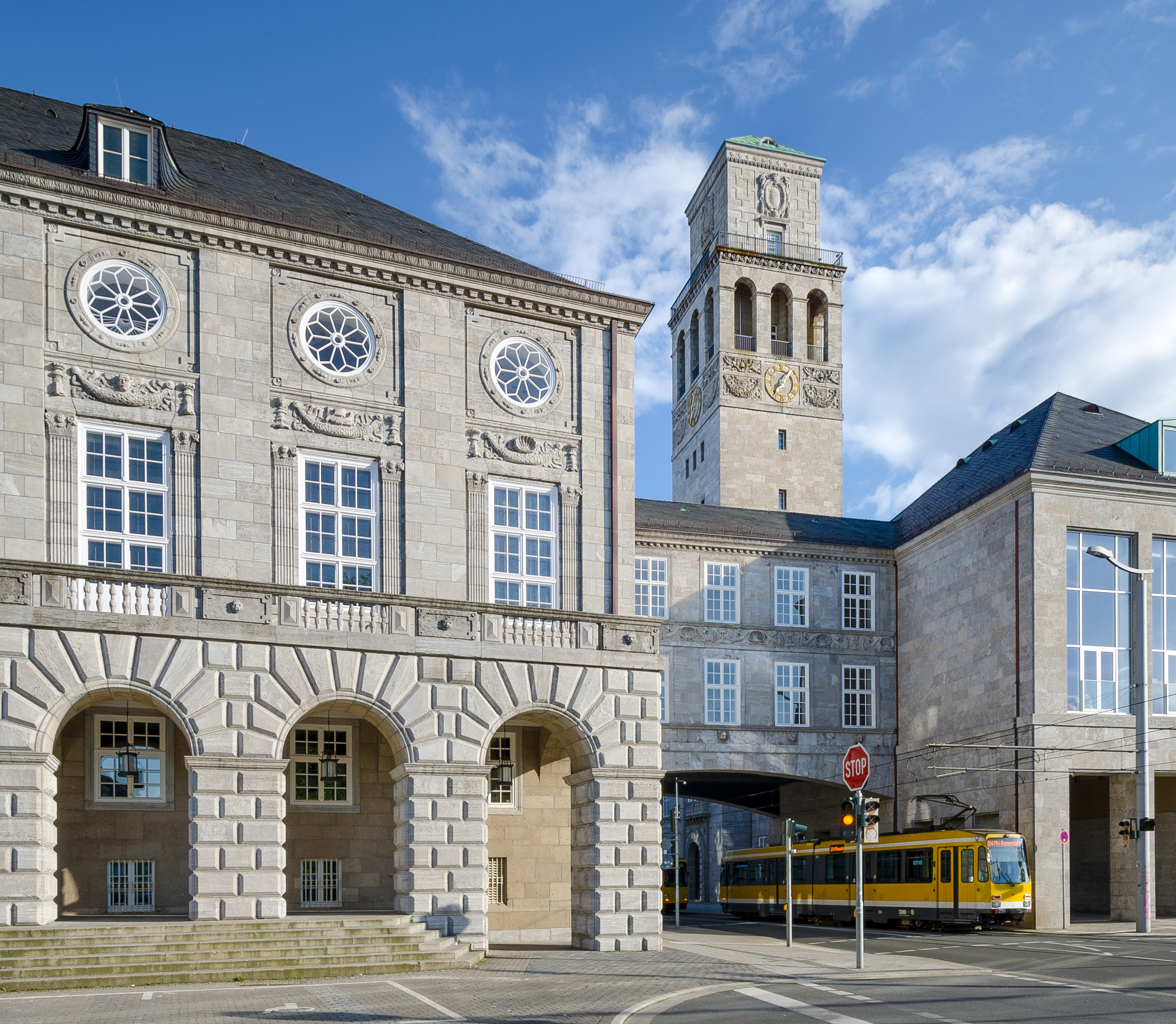
Town Hall

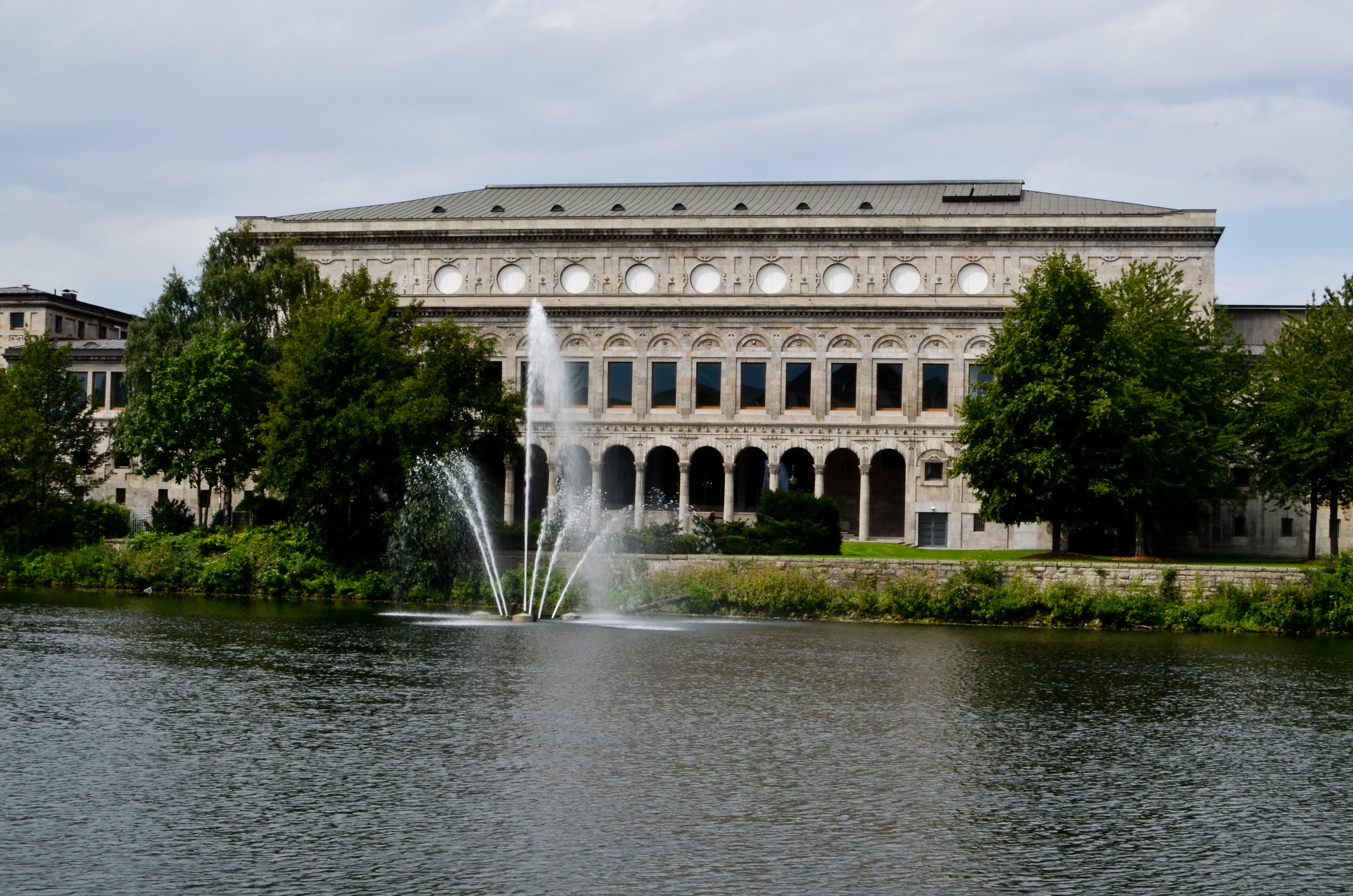
Mülheim Stadthalle

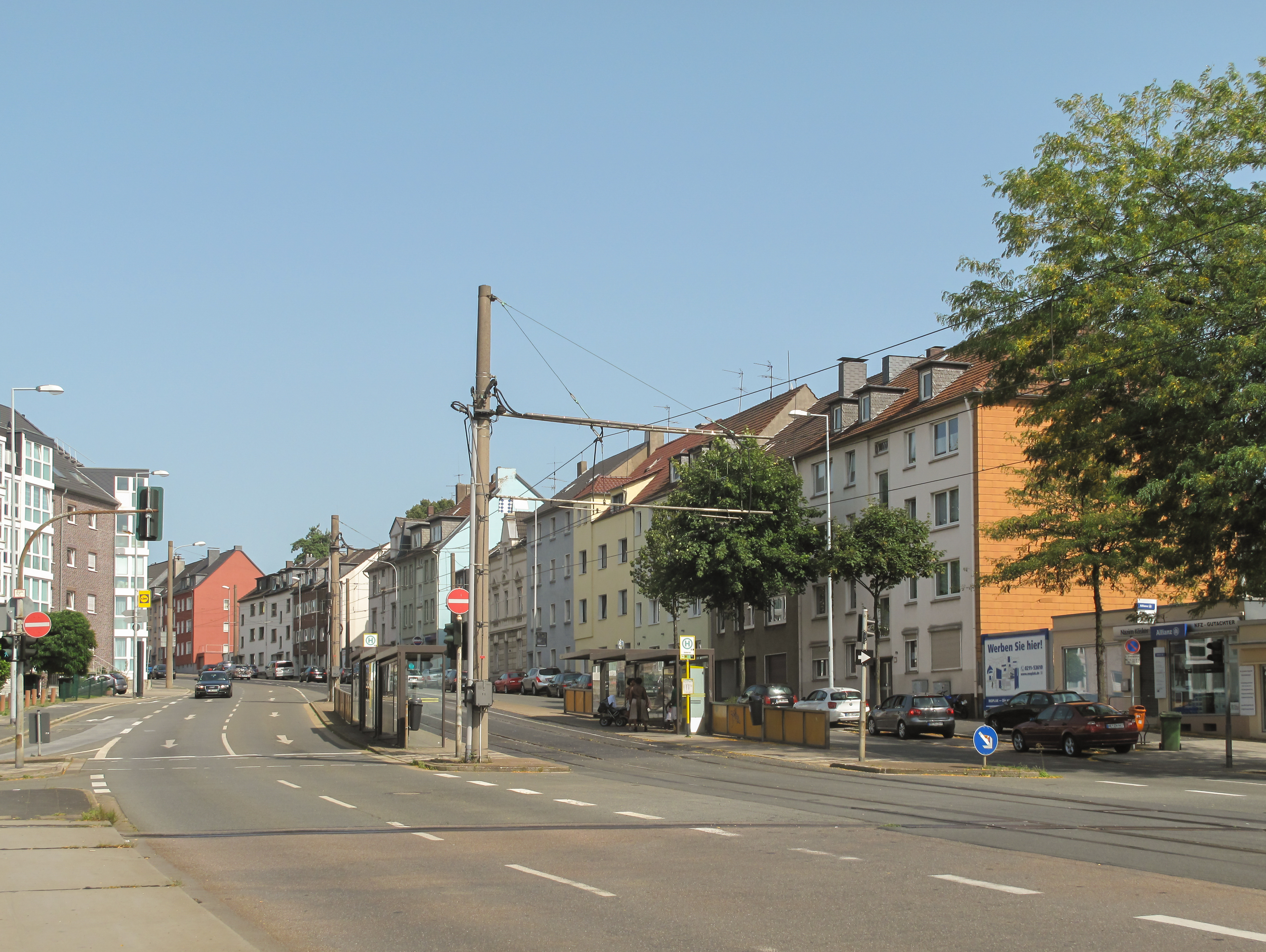
View to the street and tram station Aktienstraße

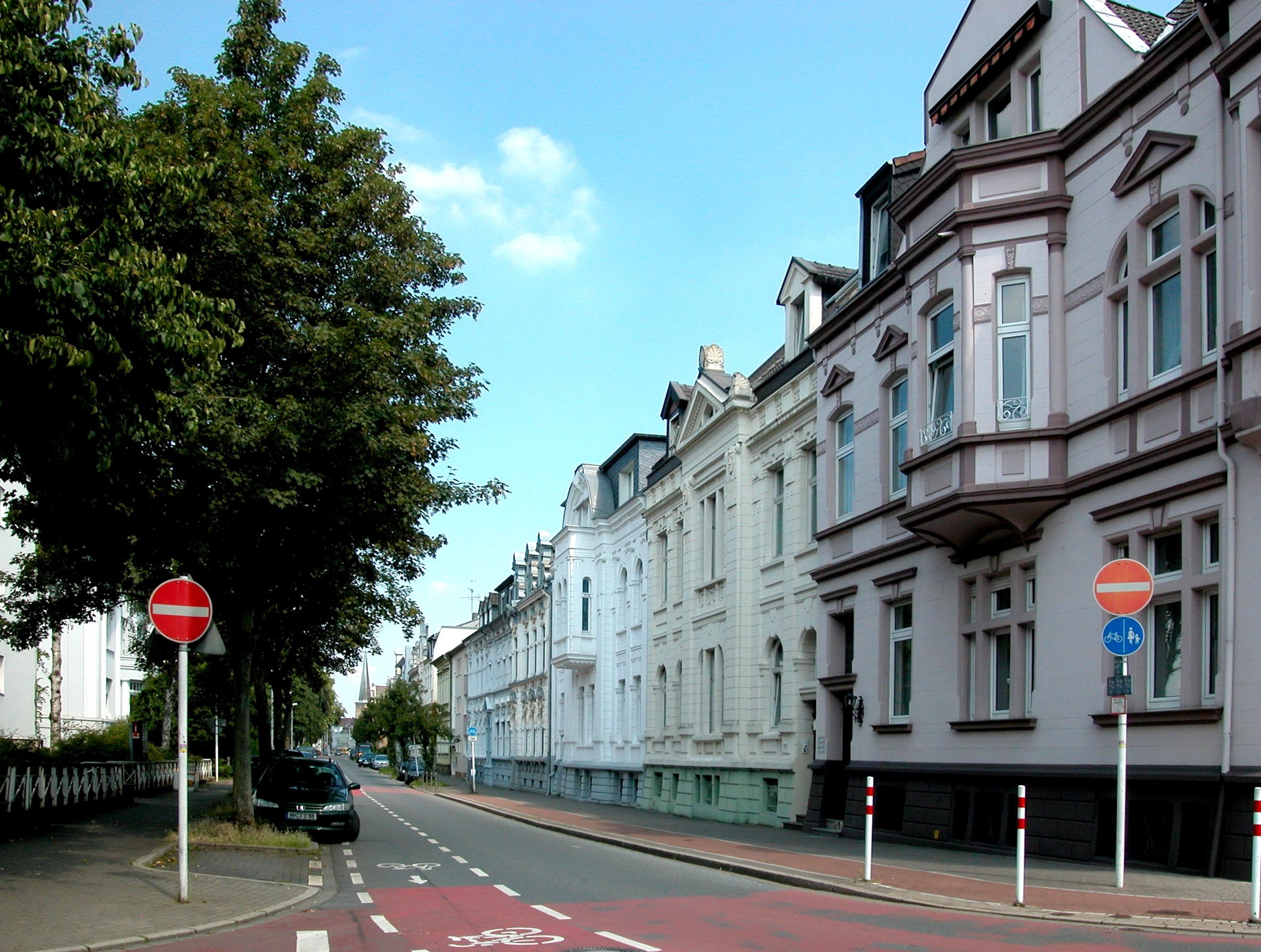
Friedrichstraße

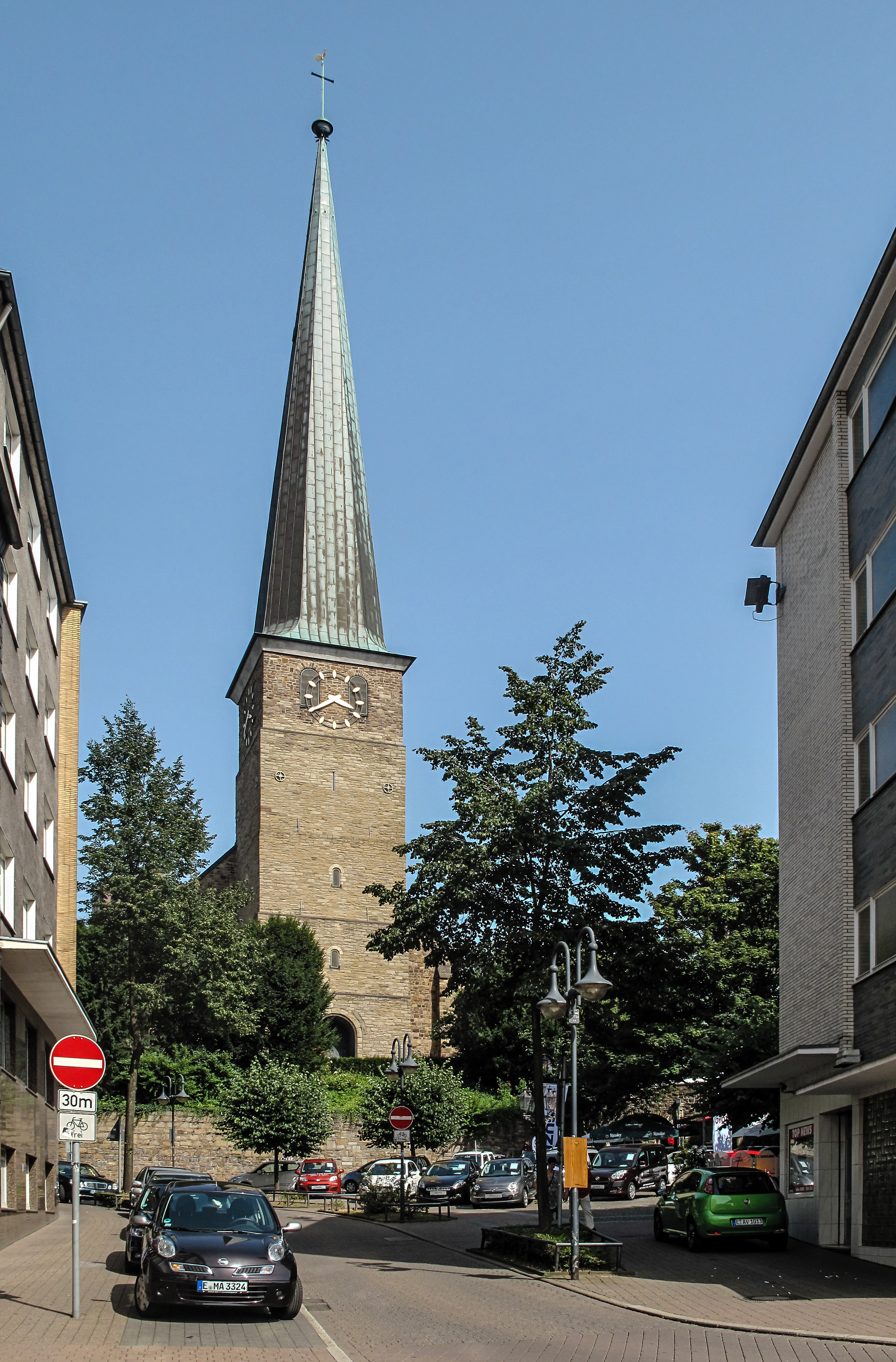
Petrikirche

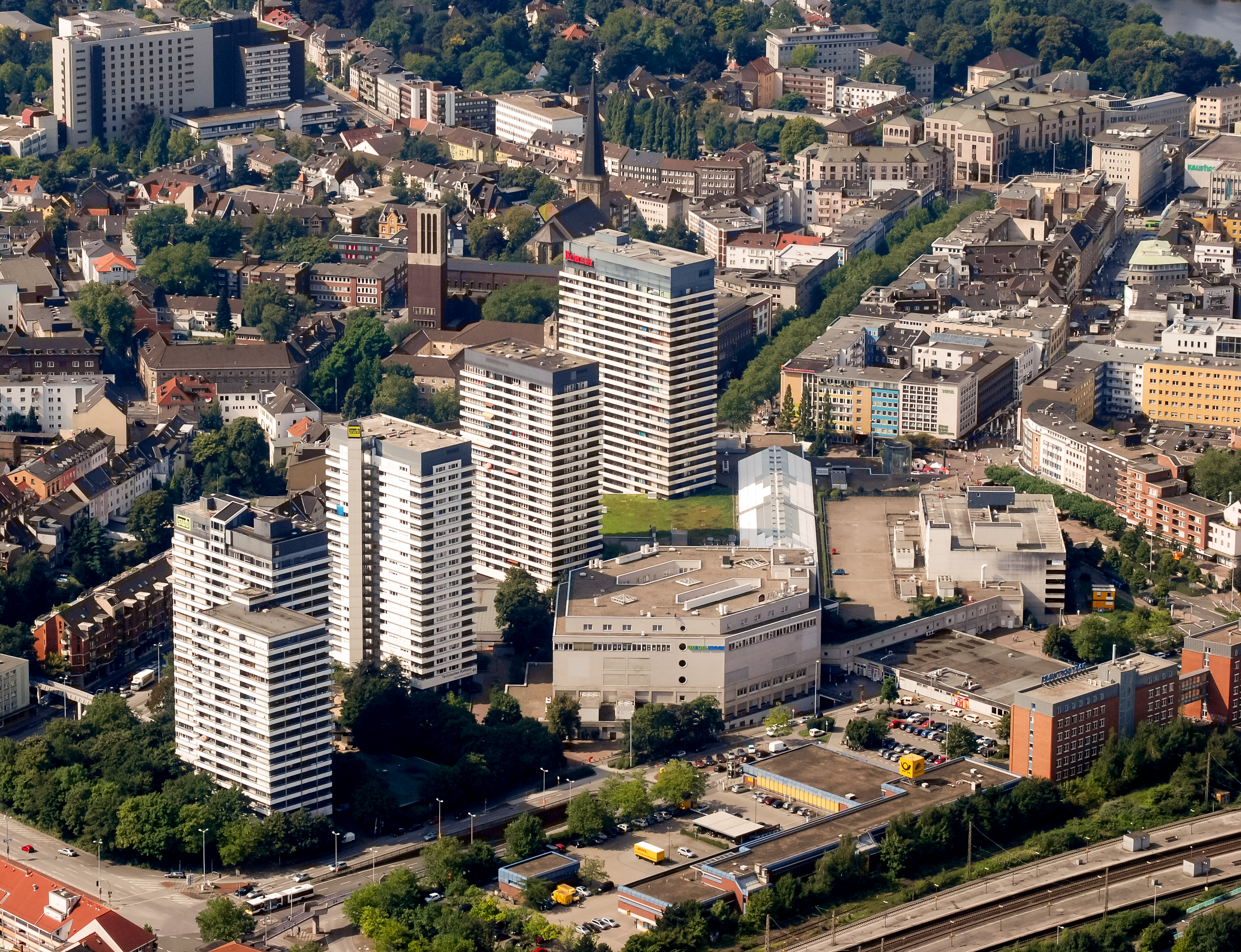
Highrise buildings in the city centre

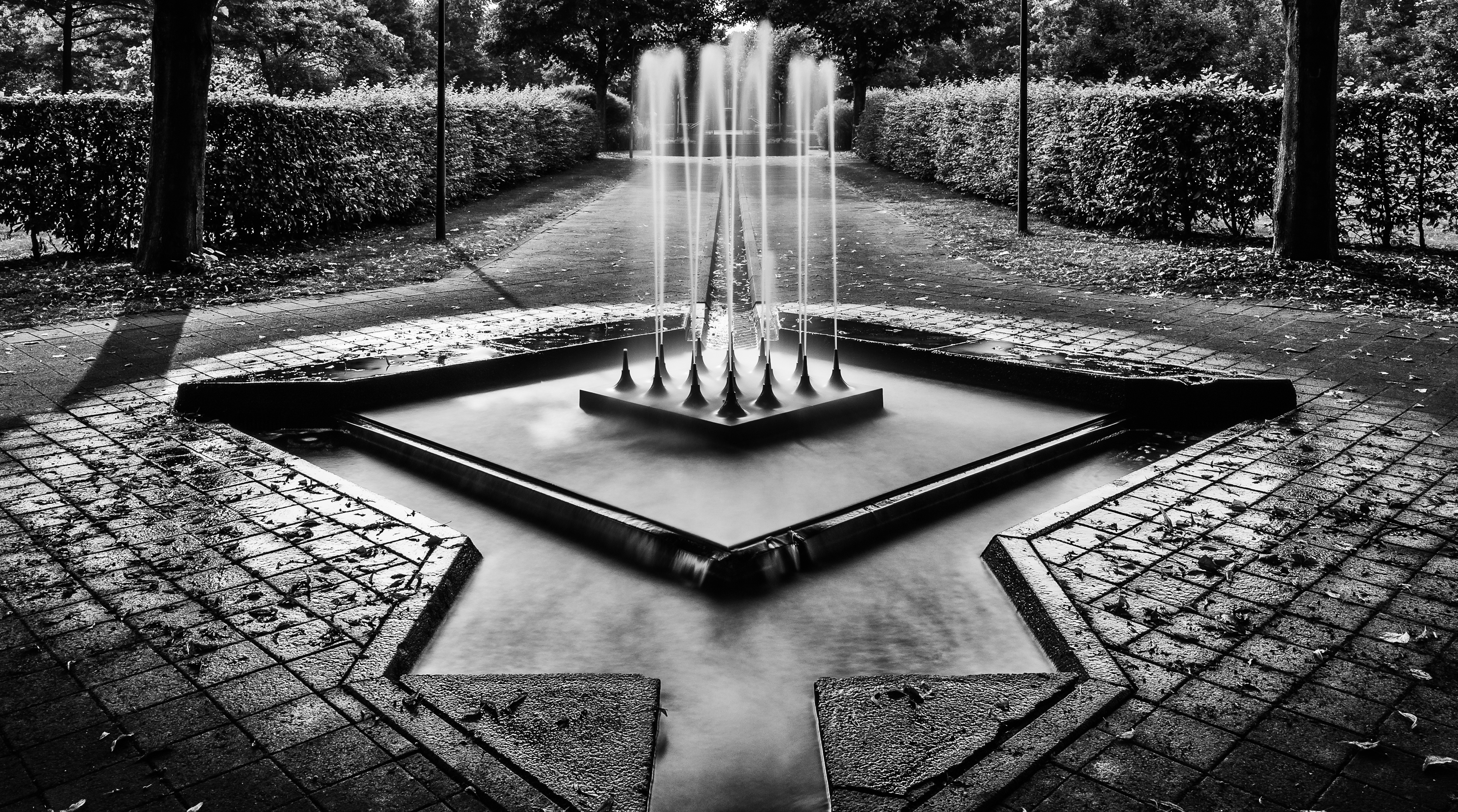
Water feature in MüGa-Park

== See also ==
- Mülheim Hauptbahnhof
