= Dagmar Mühlenfeld =

German politician (born 1951)

Dagmar Mühlenfeld (born March 2, 1951, in Mülheim an der Ruhr) is a German local politician of the SPD and former directly elected Lord Mayor of the city of Mülheim an der Ruhr. Since September 20, 2007, she has been a member of the Supervisory Board of RWE AG.

== Family and career ==
Dagmar Mühlenfeld has lived in the city on the Ruhr since birth; she is married and has a grown-up son. Her husband Rolf Mühlenfeld has been a city councillor in Mülheim an der Ruhr since 1999.

Dagmar Mühlenfeld was originally a teacher; she passed state examinations for the teaching profession at grammar schools in the subjects of German and history. Before taking office as Lord Mayor, she worked as head teacher of the Luisenschule municipal grammar school. Dagmar Mühlenfeld graduated from the same school in 1969.

Dagmar Mühlenfeld is a member of the supervisory board of RWE AG.

== Politics ==
Dagmar Mühlenfeld has been a member of the SPD since May 1, 1975. In 2001, she prevailed in a competitive vote for the chairmanship of the Mülheim SPD against the previous incumbent Thomas Schröer, who had come under criticism within the party. Until then, Dagmar Mühlenfeld had chaired the Heißen SPD local association in Mülheim an der Ruhr for several years.

After the resignation of the previous Lord Mayor Jens Baganz for personal reasons in November 2002, new elections for the office of Lord Mayor were scheduled for March 2003. The Mülheim SPD nominated Dagmar Mühlenfeld as its candidate for the early mayoral elections by ballot. On March 23, 2003, she was first put forward for the run-off election, which she won on April 6, 2003, with just under 53 percent of the votes cast and a little under 40 percent voter turnout against the CDU candidate. In 2003, Dagmar Mühlenfeld handed over the office of Mülheim SPD chairwoman to her former deputy Frank Esser. In the mayoral election on August 30, 2009, Mühlenfeld was confirmed in office for another five years with 43.1% of the vote.

The largest project she has driven forward is the Ruhrbania project.

During her term as mayor, Mühlenfeld was a member of the German delegation to the Committee of the Regions and deputy chairman of the plenary assembly of the Regionalverband Ruhr. She was also co-founder and spokesperson of the Action Alliance "Get out of Debt!" and, from April 25, 2013, until she left office, Deputy President of the Deutschen Städtetag.

On February 9, 2015, it was announced that Mühlenfeld would not be standing for re-election as mayor in 2015. Mülheim voters elected Mühlenfeld's party leader on 13 September 2015. September 2015 Mühlenfeld's party colleague Ulrich Scholten as his successor in the office of Lord Mayor, who took office on October 21, 2015.
