= Carlotto (name) =

Carlotto is an Italian surname. The following are some notable people carrying this last name:

- Carlotto, reference name for Johann Carl Loth (baptized 1632–1698), German painter
- Estela de Carlotto (born 1930), Argentine human-rights activist
- Florencia Carlotto (born 1988), Argentine volleyball player
- Laura Carlotto (1955–1978), Argentine revolutionary
- Massimo Carlotto (born 1956), Italian writer and playwright

== See also ==
- Carl Otto
- Carletto
- Carloto
- Carlotta (name)
- Marie-Arlette Carlotti
