= Carletto =

Carletto is a given name, nickname and surname.

== Nickname ==
- Carletto, nickname of Carlo Ancelotti (born 1959), Italian former football player and manager
- Carletto, nickname of Carlo Caliari (1570–1596), Italian artist
- Carletto, nickname of Carlo Mazzone (born 1937), Italian football player and manager
- Carletto Sposito, stagename of Carlo Sposito (1924–1984), Italian actor

== Surname ==
- Lino Carletto (1943–2026), Italian racing cyclist
- Neto Carletto (born 1996), Brazilian politician
- Piero Carletto (1963–2022), Italian rower

== Fictional characters ==
- Carletto, character in 1974 Italian film, All Screwed Up

== See also ==
- Carlotto (name)
- Carlette (given name)
- Gianpietro Carlesso
- Thiago Carleto
