= Lago Carlota National Reserve =

Chilean national reserve

- IUCN category IV (habitat/species management area)
- Interactive map of Lago Carlota National Reserve
- Location: Chile
- Area: 180.6 km^{2} (69.7 sq mi)
- Designation: Forest reserve, national reserve
- Designated: 1965
- Governing body: Corporación Nacional Forestal (CONAF)

Lago Carlota National Reserve is a national reserve of southern Chile's Aysén del General Carlos Ibáñez del Campo Region.
