= Carlotta Perry =

American poet (1839 or 1848 – 1914)

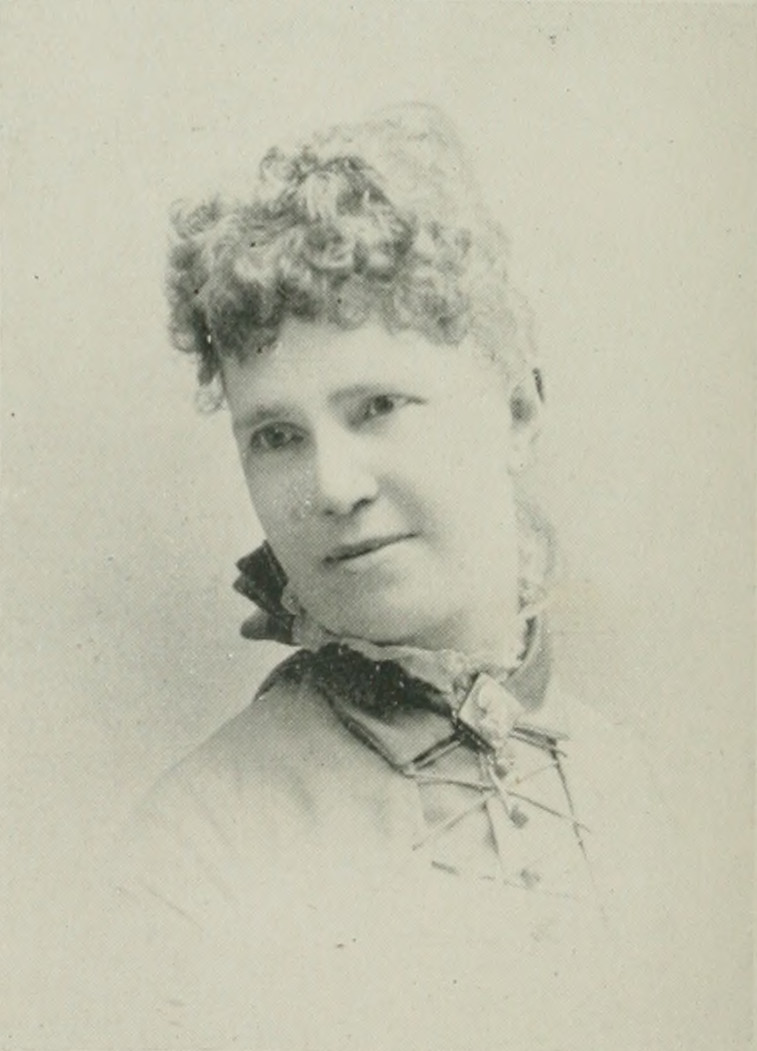
- Born: Michigan
- Died: Chicago

Carlotta Perry (1839 or 1848 – March 4, 1914), the pen name of Charlotte Augusta Perry, was an American writer of poetry and prose. She was among a group of premier women poets of the late 19th century. Her poems, children's stories, and short stories were published in many of the most read publications of the time including Harper's Magazine, Godey's Lady's Book and Lippincott's Monthly Magazine. Some of her verse can still be found today in Christian newsletters and even in an ad for a paint company describing their shades of white. Known mostly for her poetry, she was also a journalist and was active in many of the journalism and women's organizations during her working life.

== Biography ==
Charlotte Augusta Perry was born in Union City, Michigan, in 1839 or October 21, 1848. Her father's name was William Reuben Perry. He was a descendant of English Quakers, who came to the United States in early colonial days. Her mother's maiden name was Louisa M. Kimball. She was of Scotch ancestry. It was she who gave to Carlotta the poetic inclination. The death of her father, when she was eight years of age, and her childhood sorrow were the theme of her first verses.

In 1880, she moved with her mother from Watertown, Wisconsin, where Perry worked for the Watertown Democrat, to Milwaukee, Wisconsin, where she wrote for the Milwaukee Sentinel. Three years later, her mother died.

She then moved to Chicago, and devoted herself more than ever to literary work, though she was from early days a voluminous writer of prose and poetry. The recognition she received and the prompt acceptance of her manuscripts united to give constant encouragement and inspiration. A volume of poems was published in 1889. Some of her work has appeared in a dozen different volumes, notably Kate Sanborn's Wit and Humor of American Women, Jessie Fremont O'Donnell's Love Songs of Three Centuries, Thomas Wentworth Higginson's collections of American Sonnets, and in numerous religious, elocutionary and juvenile works. Several of her best adapted poems were set to music and were frequently included on concert programs. She had the distinction of receiving the best prices for her work of any writer of the Northwest.

Perry was associated with a coterie of writers including Ella Wheeler Wilcox, Sarah Dyer Hobart, Helen Hunt Jackson, Lucy Larcom and others.

In Chicago, Perry was associated with the Starret School for Girls, and belonged to the Chicago Woman's Press League. She worked on the women's building at the World's Columbian Exposition (1893) in Chicago, a member of committee on poetry and imaginative literature.

Perry died in Chicago, March 4, 1914. The burial was in Watertown.

== Selected works ==
Poems

- 1889, Poems
