= Carl Otto von Eicken =

German otorhinolaryngologist

Carl Otto von Eicken (31 December 1873, Mülheim an der Ruhr – 29 June 1960, Heilbronn) was a German otorhinolaryngologist.

== Biography ==
He studied medicine at Kiel University, the University of Geneva, the Ludwig-Maximilians-Universität München, the Friedrich Wilhelm University of Berlin, and Heidelberg University, where he served as an assistant to surgeon Vincenz Czerny. He received his habilitation for laryngo-rhinology (1903) and otology (1909) at the University of Freiburg, and in 1911 he became a full professor at the University of Giessen, where subsequently, he was named head of the newly constructed ear, nose, and throat clinic. From 1920 to 1921, he served as university rector. In 1922, he succeeded Gustav Killian (a former teacher) at the Friedrich Wilhelm University of Berlin, where he maintained a professorship up until 1950.

In May 1935 and November 1944, he removed a polyp from the left vocal cord of Adolf Hitler.

He is largely known for developing methods of examination for the throat and pharynx. The eponymous "Eicken's method" is the facilitation of hypopharyngoscopy by means of forward traction on the cricoid cartilage by a laryngeal probe. He was the author of over 100 medical works — with Alfred Schulz van Treeck, he published an atlas on ear, nose and throat diseases, titled Atlas der Hals-, Nasen-, Ohren-Krankheiten (1940).
