= Carlota S. Smith =

American linguist

Carlota Smith (May 21, 1934, New York City-May 24, 2007, Austin, Texas) was an American linguist. She was professor of linguistics at the University of Texas at Austin for 38 years.

Smith received her M.A. (1964) and Ph.D. (1967) in linguistics at the University of Pennsylvania, studying under Zellig Harris. In 1969, she joined the faculty of the Department of Linguistics at University of Texas at Austin, where she served for the remainder of her life. She was department chair from 1981-1985. She was named the Dallas TACA Centennial Professor in the Humanities in 1991.

During her long career, she made important contributions to three areas of linguistic research. Her early work examined English syntax and child language acquisition. (Shipley et al. 1969 was an influential paper in this area.) She wrote a number of papers and a widely cited book (Smith 1991) on grammatical aspect. A final research interest involved the analysis of discourse units above the level of the sentence, which she categorizes, in Smith (2003) into five ‘discourse modes’ (narrative, report, description, information, and argument).

She spent many years doing linguistic research on Navajo and became a member of the Navajo Language Academy.

== Selected publications ==
- Elizabeth F. Shipley, Carlota S. Smith and Lila R. Gleitman. 1969. A Study in the Acquisition of Language: Free Responses to Commands. Language 45: 322-342.
- Carlota S. Smith. 1991. The parameter of aspect. Kluwer.
- Carlota S. Smith. 2003. Modes of discourse: the local structure of texts. Cambridge University Press.
