= La Carlota =

La Carlota may refer to:

- La Carlota, Negros Occidental, a fourth class city in the central Philippine province of Negros Occidental
- La Carlota, Spain, a municipality in the province of Córdoba, in the autonomous community of Andalusia, Spain
- La Carlota, Argentina, a municipality in the Argentine province of Córdoba
- La Carlota, Miranda, neighborhood in Caracas, Venezuela.
  - Generalissimo Francisco de Miranda Airbase, an urban airbase in Caracas, Venezuela, commonly referred to as "La Carlota"
