= Canova (disambiguation) =

Canova may refer to:

== People ==
- Antonio Canova (1757–1822), Venetian sculptor
- Francesco Canova da Milano (1497–1543), Italian lutenist and composer
- Frank J. Canova (born 1956), Inventor of the smartphone
- Gaudenz Canova (1887–1962), Swiss politician
- Judy Canova (1913–1983), American comedian, actress, singer and radio personality
- Renato Canova (born 1944), Italian athletics coach
- Tim Canova (born 1960), American law professor

== Places ==
- Canova, New Mexico, an unincorporated community in Rio Arriba County, New Mexico
- Canova, South Dakota, a town in Miner County
- Canova, Virginia, an unincorporated community in Prince William County
- Canova, is a locality, in the comune of Galzignano Terme

== Things ==
- 6256 Canova, an asteroid
