= Carl Otto von Madai =

German law professor, politician, and statesman (1809-1850

Carl Otto von Madai (March 23, 1809 – June 4, 1850) was a German law professor, politician, and statesman.

Madai was born in Halle, and studied at the University of Halle. He became a lecturer there in 1832 and professor in 1835. He moved to the Imperial University of Dorpat in 1837, where he stayed until in 1843 he became a private secretary of Duchess Elisabeth von Nassau (died 1845).

In 1845, he became Professor of Law at the University of Kiel, where he took part in the debates over the Schleswig-Holstein Question. He participated in the Frankfurt Parliament in 1848, and then became envoy of the provisional government of Schleswig-Holstein to the German Confederation. In 1849 he also became Professor of Law at the University of Freiburg, where he died in 1850.
