= Carlota Ferreira =

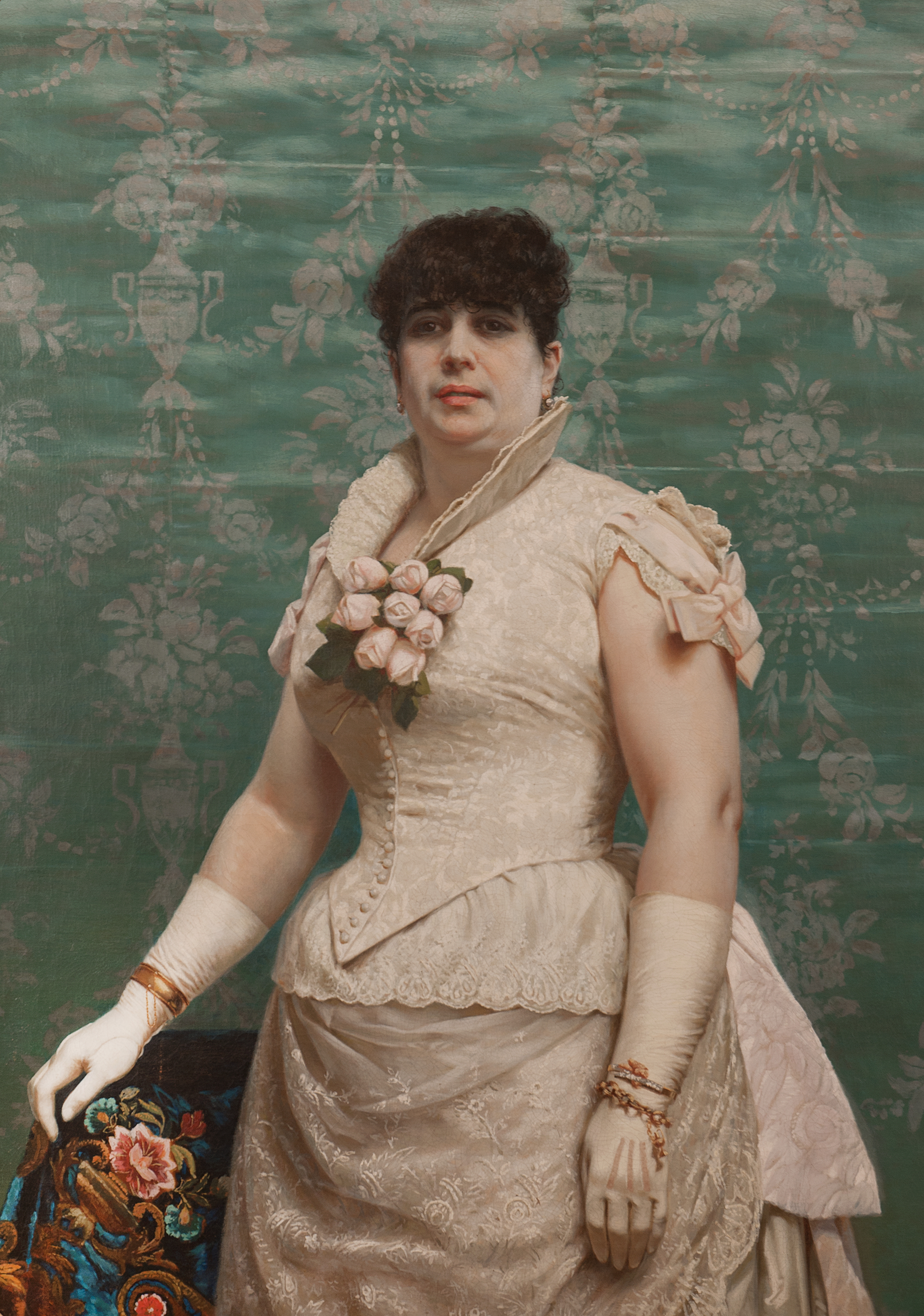
- Portrait of Carlota Ferreira by Juan Manuel Blanes
- Born: Petrona Mercedes Ferreyro García; January 31, 1838; Montevideo, Uruguay
- Died: c. 1912 (approx. 74 years old); Misiones Province, Argentina
- Spouses: Emeterio Regunaga; Ezequiel de Viana Oribe; Nicanor Blanes; Julio Jurkowsky

Carlota Ferreira (born Petrona Mercedes Ferreyro García; 31 January 1838 – c. 1912) was an Uruguayan woman who led a turbulent life of scandal and romance. She was immortalized by Juan Manuel Blanes's 1883 portrait of her likeness, which became an icon of Uruguayan art.

== Biography ==
Little is known of the life of Carlota Ferreira. However, recent research has found documents that suggest that she was the daughter of Mercedes Ferreyro García and was baptized as Petrona Mercedes Ferreyro García on 9 December 1840 in Church of Our Lady of the Mount Carmel.

In 1872, she was widowed by her husband and father of their three children, Dr. Emeterio Celedonio Regunaga, the Uruguayan Minister of Finance 23 years her senior, during the government of Lorenzo Batlle y Grau. In 1881, she remarried to Ezequiel de Viana Oribe in Buenos Aires, but was once again widowed. The family of her second husband, descended from José Joaquín de Viana, were embarrassed over the short-lived marriage.

It was 1883 when Ferreira visited the studio of Juan Manuel Blanes as the widow of Dr. Regunaga to request a portrait of her deceased husband, armed with photographs for reference.
