= Carlotta Ida Popert =

Italian painter

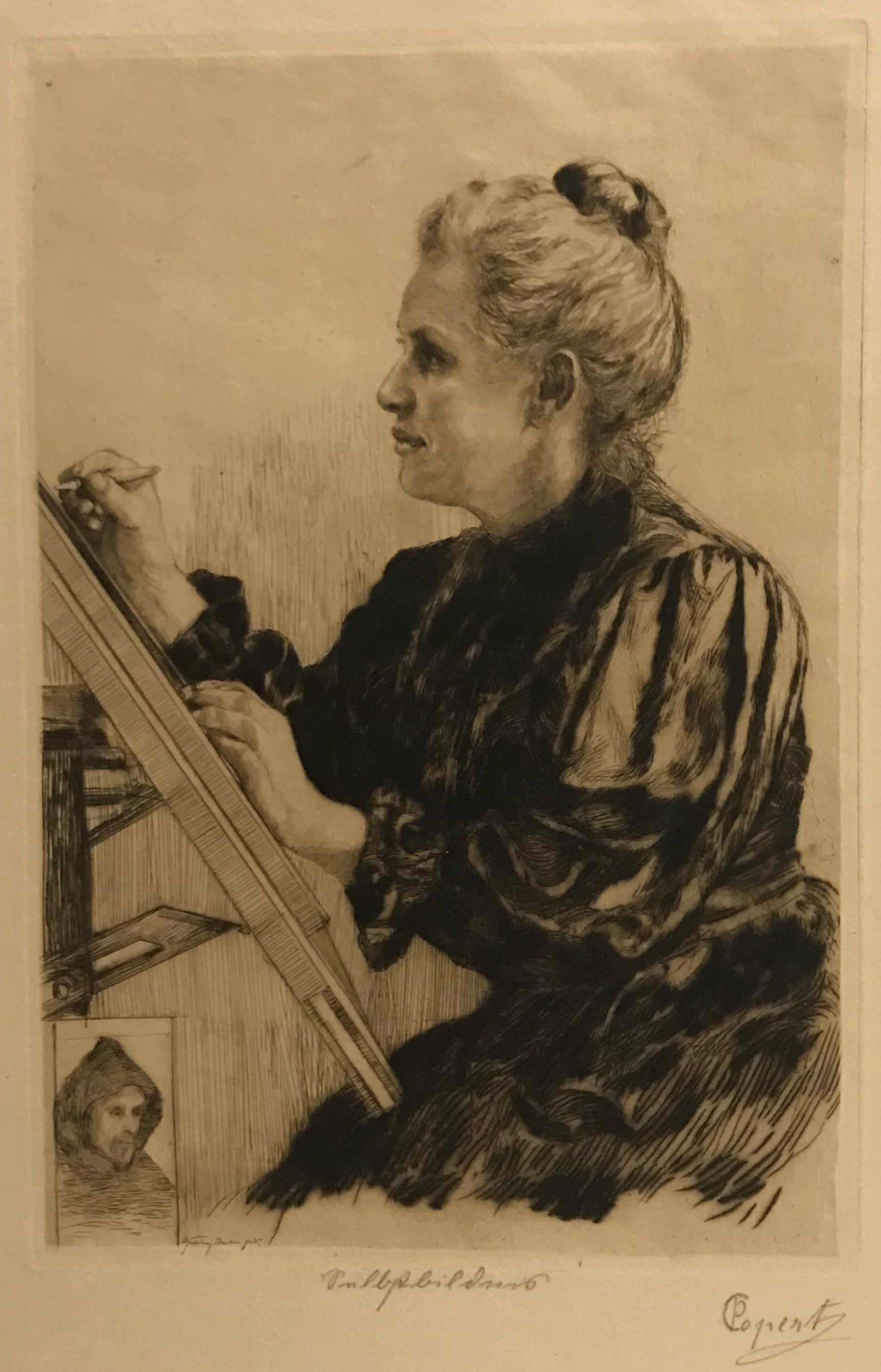
Charlotte Poppert, self-image, etching

Carlotta Ida Popert (1848 – 1923) was a German-Italian artist. She painted, mainly in watercolor, and also made etchings.

== Biography ==
Popert was born in Hamburg, and studied there with Friedrich Preller the Elder. She lived in Rome for many years, where she studied with Pio Joris, moving there in the early 1880s. She exhibited in 1883 at Rome: Nel tempio di Betlemme. Other works include: The grandmother in the sixteenth century, exhibited in 1884 at Turin; a Portrait in watercolor, exhibited in 1887 at Venice and at the 1890 Exhibition Beatrice in Florence, where she won a silver medal. She died in Rome in 1923.
