= Carlotta Valdes =

Carlotta Valdes or Valdez may refer to:

- Carlotta Valdes, fictional dead person in Hitchcock's film Vertigo
- "Carlotta Valdez", song on Harvey Danger's 1997 album Where Have All the Merrymakers Gone?
- Carlotta Valdes or Valdez, character in film Sex and Death 101
- Carlotta Valdez, character in film Hail, Caesar!
