= Lotta Dann =

New Zealand journalist (born 1971)

Lotta Dann MNZM
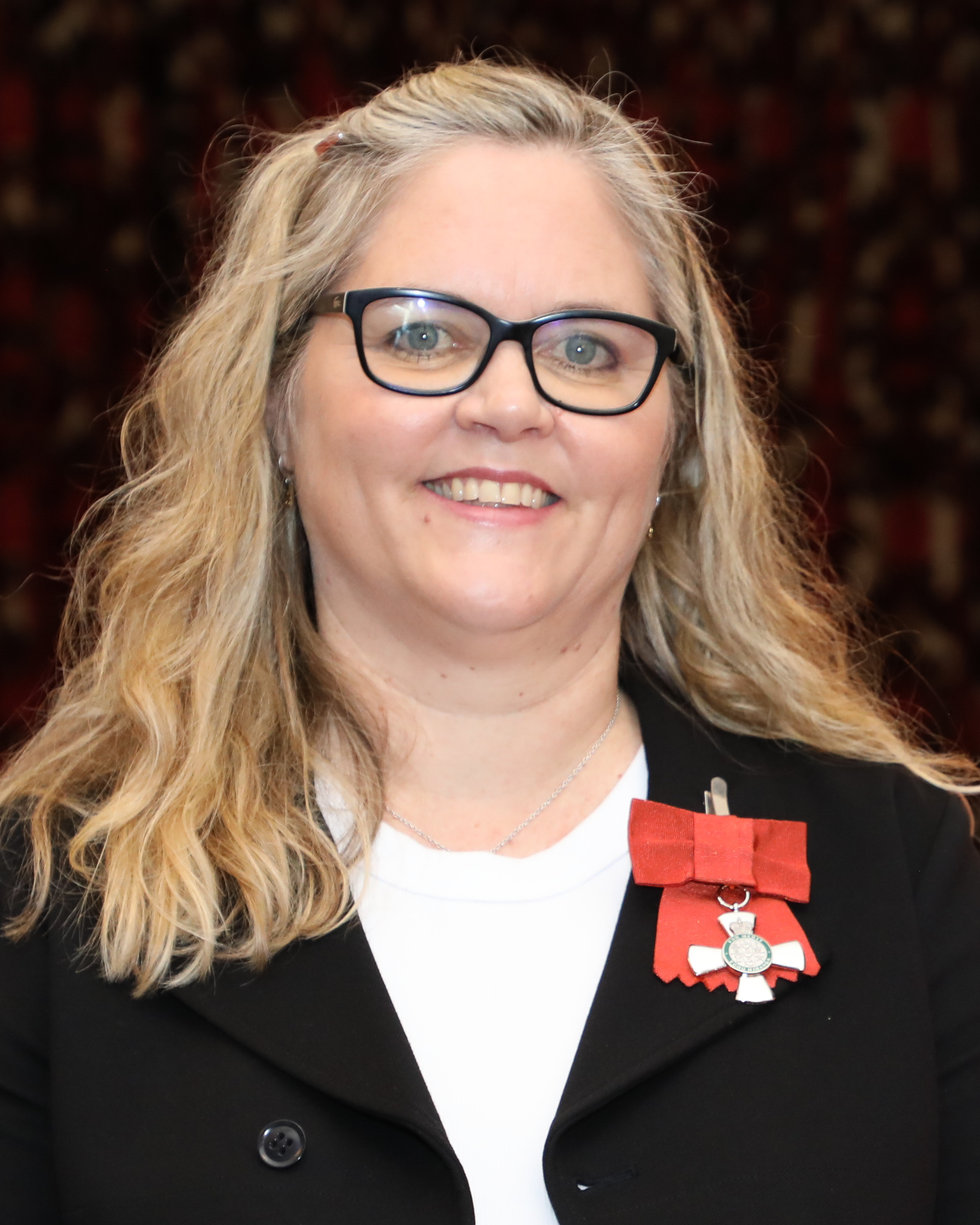
- Dann in 2023
- Born: Carlotta Brigid McVeigh; 1971 (age 54–55)
- Awards: Member of the New Zealand Order of Merit

Academic background
- Education: University of Auckland
- Thesis: Is that really me?: Power, Emotion & Knowledge in Reality TV (2013)
- Academic advisors: Valentina Cardo, Amy West

Carlotta Brigid Dann MNZM (née McVeigh) is a New Zealand journalist, author and addiction services advocate. In 2023 Dann was appointed a Member of the New Zealand Order of Merit for services to addiction advocacy.

== Academic career ==
Dann grew up in Christchurch, and was the second of four girls. Her father is KC Chris McVeigh. Dann completed a media studies Master's degree titled Is that really me?: Power, Emotion & Knowledge in Reality TV at the University of Auckland in 2013. She also has a postgraduate degree in counselling.

Dann is married to political editor Corin Dann, and the couple have three children. When Dann found herself hiding wine bottles from her husband to disguise the amount she was drinking, she decided to get sober. In 2011 she began an anonymous blog, Mrs D is Going Without, to detail her daily struggle with stopping drinking. She had been drinking since she was 15, and by that time says she had been a functioning alcoholic for 24 years. After several years sober, Dann published a memoir, also named Mrs D is Going Without. Dann partnered with agencies including the New Zealand Drug Foundation, Te Hiringa Hauora Health Promotion Agency and Matua Raki to create Living Sober, an online community to support New Zealanders living with alcohol addiction. An independent evaluation found that living sober reached 25,000 people in 2021, and 68% of members reporting becoming sober since joining the community.

Dann has also published on the emotional recovery after becoming sober (Mrs D is Going Within, 2017), and on the ways the alcohol industry targets women (The Wine O'Clock Myth, 2020). In 2025, Dann published a book on recovering from her negative experiences with diet culture (Mrs D is Not on a Diet, 2025).

== Honours and awards ==
In the 2023 New Year Honours Dann was appointed a Member of the New Zealand Order of Merit for services to addiction advocacy.

== Selected works ==
- Dann, Lotta (25 June 2014). Mrs D is Going Without. A&U New Zealand. ISBN 9781877505393.
- Dann, Lotta (24 May 2017). Mrs D is Going Within: How a frantic, sugar-binging, internet-addicted, recovering-alcoholic housewife found her Zen. Allen & Unwin.
- Dann, Lotta (16 June 2020). The Wine O'Clock Myth: The Truth You Need to Know About Women and Alcohol. 9781988547220. ISBN 9781988547220.
- Dann, Lotta (4 February 2025). Mrs D is (Not) on a Diet. Allen & Unwin. ISBN 9781991006257.
