= Carlitos =

- Gender: Male

Origin
- Meaning: Alternate spelling for Carlos (Charles)

Other names
- Related names: Carlito

Carlitos is a Spanish or Portuguese nickname (usually a diminutive for Carlos). It may refer to:

== Persons ==
- Carlitos (footballer, born 1921) (1921–2001), Brazilian former football striker
- Carlitos (footballer, born 1976), full name Carlos Domínguez Domínguez, Spanish former football forward
- Carlitos (footballer, born 1977), full name Carlos Manuel da Silva Cunha, Portuguese former football winger
- Carlitos (footballer, born 1981), full name Carlos Pereira Rodrigues, Portuguese former football defender
- Carlitos (footballer, born 1982), full name Carlos Alberto Alves Garcia, Portuguese former football winger
- Carlitos (footballer, born March 1985), full name Juan Carlos Moreno Rojo, Spanish former football midfielder
- Carlitos (footballer, born April 1985), full name Carlos Emanuel Soares Tavares, Cape Verdean former football defender
- Carlitos (footballer, born July 1985), full name João Carlos Dias Correia, Portuguese football forward
- Carlitos (footballer, born 1988), full name Carlos Miguel Gomes de Almeida, Angolan football winger
- Carlitos (footballer, born 1990), full name Carlos Daniel López Huesca, Spanish football forward
- Carlitos (footballer, born 1993), full name Carlos Miguel Tavares Oliveira, Portuguese football winger
- Carlos Alcaraz (born 2003), Spanish tennis player
- Carlos Arroyo (born 1979), Puerto Rican basketball player
- Carlos Balá (1925–2022), Argentine actor who specialized in children's entertainment
- Carlos Chimomole (born 1984), Mozambican football midfielder
- Carlos Colón Sr. (born 1948), Puerto Rican professional wrestler
- Carlos Gardel (1890–1935), Argentine Tango singer
- Carlos Páez Rodríguez (born 1953), survivor in the "Cordillera de los Andes" disaster
- Carlos Sainz Jr. (born 1994), Formula 1 driver — nicknamed by family and friends
- Carlos Tevez (born 1984), Argentine football striker

== Fictional ==
- The Tramp, a Charlie Chaplin character
- Carlitos Casagrande, a character from the animated series The Casagrandes

== See also ==
- Carlito (name)
- Callitos Lopez
