= Carlotta Vagnoli =

Italian feminist activist and author (born 1987)

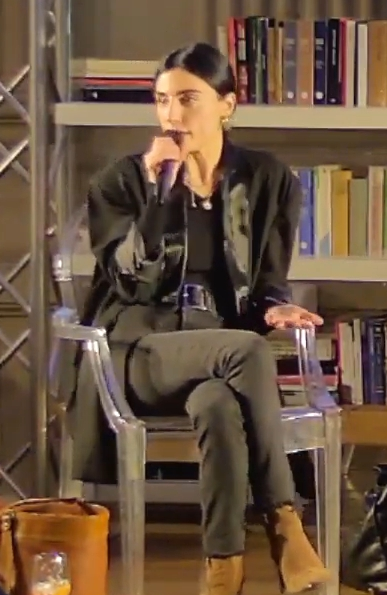
- Vagnoli in 2022
- Born: 6 November 1987 (age 38); Florence, Tuscany, Italy
- Occupations: Activist; writer; Internet personality
- Writing career
- Language: Italian
- Years active: 2015–present
- Genres: Essay; novel; theatre play
- Subjects: Gender equality; sexual consent; gender-based violence
- Notable work: Memoria delle mie puttane allegre

Carlotta Vagnoli (Italian pronunciation: [karˈlɔtta vaɲˈɲɔːli]; born 6 November 1987) is an Italian feminist activist and author. Her activity, ranging between book and article writing, theatre plays, and social media content, focuses on gender equality, sexual consent, and gender-based violence.

== Early life ==
Born in Florence and raised in Marina di Castagneto Carducci, Vagnoli moved to Milan to attend university. During her college years, she also worked as a barista in a night club.

== Career ==
In 2015, Vagnoli began collaborating as a sex columnist for GQ and Playboy. In 2016, following the end of an abusive relationship, she started exploring the topics of gender equality and gender-based violence, writing an article about the death of Tiziana Cantone for GQ, which she has referred to as a "turning point".

In the following years, she gained prominence as one of the main Italian feminist activists on the Internet, due to her activity on social media – particularly Instagram – to raise awareness on consent, gender equality, and the need to deconstruct harmful gender stereotypes. In 2021, Fabbri Editori published her first book Maledetta sfortuna ("Damn Misfortune"), an essay analyzing cultural stereotypes and patriarchal structures at the basis of violence against women. The essay was well received by the public, debuting in third place on the ranking of best-selling non-fiction books in Italy and remaining in the top ten for four weeks. The same year, Einaudi published her e-book Poverine. Come non si racconta il femminicidio ("Poor Things – How You're Not Supposed to Speak About Femicide"), critical of the language the press uses to frame cases of femicide; in the book, Vagnoli presents what poet Alida Airaghi has described as "a deontological handbook that media should rely on when reporting on femicides: avoid sensationalism, morbid details, trauma porn, victim blaming, and any encouragement of imitation."

Since 2022, she has appeared alongside Vanessa Giovagnoli on the Rai Radio 1 programme Il mondo nuovo, as an expert of youth and social media. She has often featured as a commentator on the La7 TV broadcast Otto e mezzo. In 2022, her book Memoria delle mie puttane allegre ("Memories of My Happy Whores", playing on Memories of My Melancholy Whores by Gabriel García Márquez) was published by Marsilio, in which, reflecting on her lived experience, Vagnoli argues that women in Western culture are viewed dichotomously as either saints or prostitutes. For the book, she was awarded the Fuori Passaggi Prize at the Passaggi Festival in Fano. Two years later, Einaudi published her first novel, titled Animali notturni ("Nocturnal Animals"), set in Milan in the 2000s and partly based on her work experience at night clubs.

Since 2023, she has co-hosted the Basement Café podcast on YouTube in pair with Antonio Dikele Distefano, which is recorded live from a theatre. In 2024, she wrote the theatrical monologue Le solite stronze ("The Usual Bitches"), which reflects on the stereotypes used to portray women through the analysis of both real and fictional female figures – such as Emma Bovary, Catherine Earnshaw, Carola Rackete, and Laura Boldrini. In March 2025, her play Una stanza tutta per noi ("A Room All to Ourselves") premiered at Teatro Carcano in Milan. She currently writes for D – la Repubblica delle donne, a magazine attached to la Repubblica.

== Legal issues ==
In October 2025, Vagnoli was notified by the public prosecutor's office of Monza that she was under investigation for stalking and aggravated defamation alongside influencer Valeria Fonte and writer Benedetta Sabene; the three were accused of conducting an online campaign claiming that a former partner of one of their friends had been responsible for psychological abuse, resulting in him developing suicidal thoughts.

Vagnoli and Fonte were also reported for stalking by social media strategist Serena Mazzini, who was the victim of a smear campaign accusing her of being part of a Telegram group in which homophobic and body shaming posts were shared. Writing for Il Fatto Quotidiano, journalist Selvaggia Lucarelli reported that prosecutors had found on their cell phones private chats where, along with other activists, they made sexist, antisemitic and generally degrading comments about a number of Italian public figures. They were also reported to have organized smear campaigns against other figures, exploiting cancel culture in an attempt to permanently discredit and isolate them.

In mid-February 2026, the prosecutors requested that all stalking accusations against Vagnoli, Fonte and Sabene be dropped, citing the lack of substantial evidence. Mazzini's legal team announced that they would file against the archiviation.

== Works ==
=== Books ===
- Maledetta sfortuna. Vedere, riconoscere e rifiutare la violenza di genere (2021, Fabbri Editori; ISBN 978-88-91-58519-6)
- Poverine. Come non si racconta il femminicidio (2021, Einaudi, Quanti series; ISBN 978-88-58-43813-8)
- Memoria delle mie puttane allegre (2022, Marsilio; ISBN 978-88-29-71518-3)
- Animali notturni (2024, Einaudi, I coralli series; ISBN 978-88-58-44288-3)

=== Plays ===
- Le solite stronze (2024)
- Una stanza tutta per noi (2025)
