= Carlito (name) =

Carlito is a Spanish or Portuguese masculine given name, nickname that is a diminutive form of Carlos. Notable people with this name include the following:

== Given name ==
- Carlito Joaquin Cenzon (1939 – 2019), Filipino Roman Catholic bishop
- Carlito Fermina (born 2000), Dutch footballer
- Carlito Galvez Jr. (born 1962), Filipino general
- Carlito A. Lanada, Sr. (born 1939), Filipino martial artist
- Carlito Puno, Filipino technocrat

== Nickname ==
- Carlito, one of many stage names of Jonny Jakobsen (born 1963), eurodance artist
- Carlito Caribbean Cool, former stage name of Carlos Edwin Colón Jr., who is known as Carly Colón (born 1979), Puerto Rican wrestler
- Carlito Olivero, professional name of Carlos Emmanuel Olivero (born 1989), American singer
- Hypno Carlito, stage name of Robert Roger Amparan (born 1989), American rapper, singer, and songwriter

== Fictional characters ==
- Carlito, crime syndicate leader in Crank film
- Carlito Brigante antihero of Carlito's Way media franchise
- Carlito Keyes, mayor antagonist in first game of Dead Rising series.

== See also ==
- Carlino (name)
- Carlitos
