= Karl Otto Ludwig von Arnim =

German travel writer (1779–1861)

Karl Otto Ludwig von Arnim (1 August 1779 in Berlin – 9 February 1861 in Berlin) was a German travel writer.

He studied at Halle and Göttingen, and then traveled through Europe. He was then an attaché in Stockholm, at times directing the royal theater in Berlin. In 1835, he began another series of travels, this time through southern Europe. His books of travel in France, Italy, Spain, Russia, and the orient, Hurried remarks of a traveler in a hurry (German: Flüchtigen Bemerkungen eines flüchtigen Reisenden, Berlin, 6 vols., 1838–50), were much valued.

In his earlier years, he also wrote for the stage: New means for paying old debts (German: Neues Mittel, alte Schulden zu bezahlen, a play in five acts after Massinger; debuted 19 January 1821 in Berlin) and Der Smaragdring (in 4 acts; debuted under the name of C. Marinof's on 10 April 1828 in Berlin).
