= Lotte Labowsky =

Jewish German classicist (1905–1991)

Carlotta Minna "Lotte" Labowsky (1905–1991) was a Jewish German classicist who left Germany in 1934 and became a Fellow of Somerville College, Oxford. She specialised in "the transmission of ancient Greek thought to the western world", working on the Corpus Platonicum Medii Aevi series and on the library of Bessarion.

== Early life and education ==
Labowsky was born 23 April 1905 in Hamburg to a Jewish family. She studied classics and philosophy in Munich and then took a doctorate in Heidelberg in 1932. She volunteered in the Warburg Library in Hamburg, established by Aby Warburg whose daughters had been her school-friends. After anti-Jewish legislation was introduced in 1933, the Warburg Library moved to London and became the Warburg Institute, and she was invited to continue her research there; she was a senior research fellow of the Warburg Institute 1946–1951.

== Refugee and scholar ==
Labowsky moved to Oxford in 1934, and was supported initially by the Society for the Protection of Science and Learning (SPSL, later the Council for At-Risk Academics). She managed to bring her parents, and their furniture, out of Germany before the outbreak of war. By January 1939 the SPSL's support had reduced, and Somerville College offered to support Labowsky through free meals in the Senior Common Room and then through a research grant. The principal of the college, Helen Darbishire, wrote letters to protect Labowsky from internment as an enemy alien, and to ask for her father Norbert to be released after he was interned in June 1940.

Somerville offered her the post of acting librarian in 1943, and in 1946 she was appointed as the Lady Carlisle Senior Research Fellow. She subsequently became an Additional Fellow and a member of the governing body of the college, and was an honorary research fellow from 1972 to 1991.

Her scholarly work included the Corpus Platonicum Medii Aevi, working on this from 1936 along with Raymond Klibansky and continuing alone after 1941. She studied the Greek manuscripts which Bessarion gave to the Republic of Venice, publishing Bessarion's Library and the Biblioteca Marciano in 1979, and wrote his biography for the Dizionario Biografico degli Italiani. On her death in 1991, Labowsky's legacy to Somerville included a collection of antiquarian books, a painting by Paula Modersohn-Becker and funding for a fellowship named for Rosemary Woolf.

Labowsky proof-read the German text for the posthumous publication of Ludwig Wittgenstein's Remarks on Colour (1977) and advised the translation of On Certainty (1969) and Remarks on the Foundations of Mathematics (1956).

She died in Oxford on 28 July 1991, aged 86. Her obituary in The Times said that she "...embodied the humanist tradition of a bygone age in Europe".

== Selected publications ==
- Die ethik des Panaitios : untersuchungen zur geschichte des decorum bei Cicero und Horaz (1934, Leipzig : F. Meiner)
- Corpus platonicum medii aevi. Auspiciis Academiae Britannicae adiuvantibus Instituto Warburgiano Londinensi unitisque academiis edidit Raymundus Klibansky. vol. 1. Meno. Interprete Henrico Aristippo. Edidit Victor Kordeuter. Recognovit et praefatione instruxit. Carlotta Labowsky. (1940–1953)
- Bessarion's library and the Biblioteca Marciana : six early inventories (1979, Warburg Institute)
