= 2020 in Germany =

- Decades: 2000s; 2010s; 2020s; 2030s
- See also: Other events of 2020; History of Germany • Timeline • Years

The following is a list of events from the year 2020 in Germany.

== Incumbents ==
- President: Frank-Walter Steinmeier
- Chancellor: Angela Merkel

== Events ==
=== January ===
- 5 January – Beginning of Volleyball at the 2020 Summer Olympics – Men's European qualification
- 6 January – End of 2019–20 Four Hills Tournament, a ski jumping event co-hosted by Germany and Austria
- 17 January – Beginning of 2020 Men's EuroHockey Indoor Nations Championship
- 20 January – Beginning of 2020 German Masters
- 21 February – 2020 Junior World Luge Championships
- 24 January – 2020 Rot am See shooting
- 27 January – The first recorded infection of the COVID-19 pandemic in Germany occurs in Bavaria.

=== February ===
- 5 February – The Start of the 2020 Thuringian government crisis. The Crisis was triggered by the election of Thomas Kemmerich from Free Democratic Party (Germany) FDP as Thuringian Minister President with votes from the Alternative for Germany (AfD), Christian Democratic Union of Germany (CDU) and (FDP). The election attracted considerable national and international attention because, for the first time in the history of the Federal Republic of Germany, a Minister President was elected with votes from a far-right populist party, in this case the AfD.
- 8 February – Kemmerich resigns as the Thuringian Minister President.
- 19 February – Hanau shootings
- 20 February – 70th Berlin International Film Festival
- 21 February
  - Beginning of IBSF World Championships 2020
  - Beginning of 2020 Judo Grand Slam Düsseldorf
- 22 February – 2020 German Indoor Athletics Championships
- 23 February – 2020 Hamburg state election: the SPD remains in first place with 39% of the vote.
- 24 February – Volkmarsen ramming attack
- 26 February – Beginning of 2020 UCI Track Cycling World Championships

=== March ===
- 9 March – First death in Essen in COVID-19 pandemic in Germany
- 12 March – The Federal Office for the Protection of the Constitution (BfV) classified the Flügel a far-right faction within Germany's Alternative for Germany (AfD) as "a right-wing extremist endeavor against the free democratic basic order" that was incompatible with Germany's Basic Law, and placed the group under intelligence surveillance.
- 16 March – COVID-19 pandemic in Germany; All schools in Germany are closed

=== April ===
- 20 April – 2020 coronavirus pandemic in Germany, Germany reopens shops with cloth face mask restriction for buyers, but Chancellor Angela Merkel warns of a second coronavirus wave in the country in autumn 2020.
- 30 April – 2020 coronavirus pandemic in Germany - After a summit between Angela Merkel and state leaders, the federal government allowed opening of museums, monuments, botanical gardens and zoos, and religious services under strict social distancing conditions.

=== May ===
- 5 May – German Bundesverfassungsgericht decided, that the expanded asset-purchase programme (EAPP) since 2015 by European Central Bank violates German law.
- 7 May – German parliament Bundestag bans conversion therapy for those under 18 years nationwide and forbids advertising of conversion therapy. It also forbids conversion therapy for adults, if they decided by force, fraud or pressure.
- 15 May – Germany's Bundestag votes to make the burning of the EU flag or that of another country a hate crime equivalent to that of burning the German flag - carrying a sentence of up to three years in prison. The only major party that opposed the move was the right-wing Alternative for Germany.

=== July ===
- 21 July – The government of Baden-Württemberg bans full-face coverings burqas, niqabs for all school children. the rule will apply to primary and secondary education. Winfried Kretschmann the Ministers-President said that full-face veiling did not belong in a free society.

=== August ===
- 22 August – Alexai Navalny, a seriously ill Russian opposition leader, is taken to Berlin for treatment.
- 29 August – hundreds of protesters try to storm the Reichstag. Early in the day tens of thousands protested against government measures for the coronavirus.

=== September ===
- 2 September – The German government claims to have "unequivocal proof" that Alexai Navalny was poisoned with Novichok.
- 3 September – 2020 Solingen killings

=== October ===
- 4 October – 2020 Dresden knife attack.

=== December ===
- 1 December – 2020 Trier attack.

== Deaths ==
=== January ===
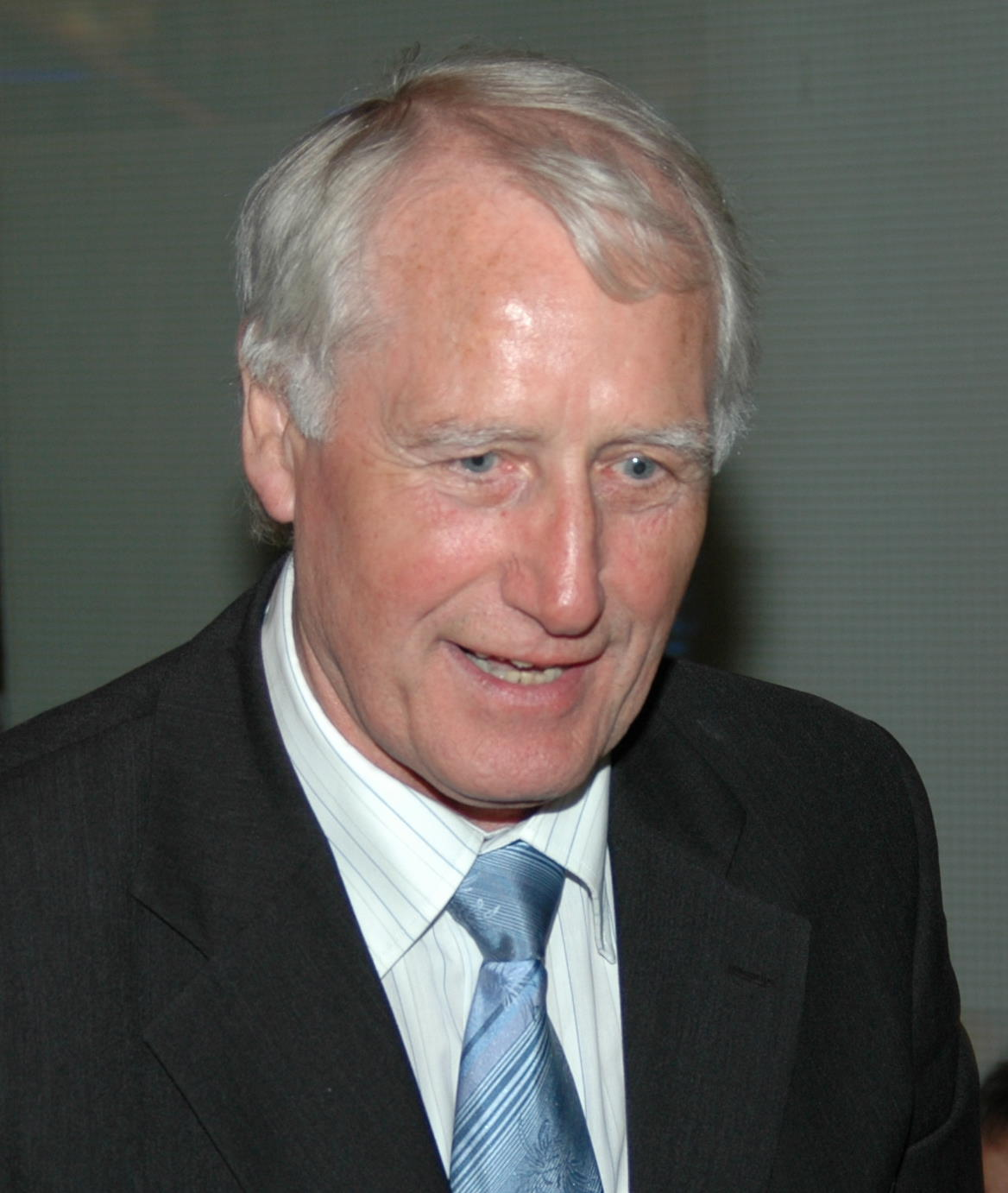
Hans Tilkowski in 2005

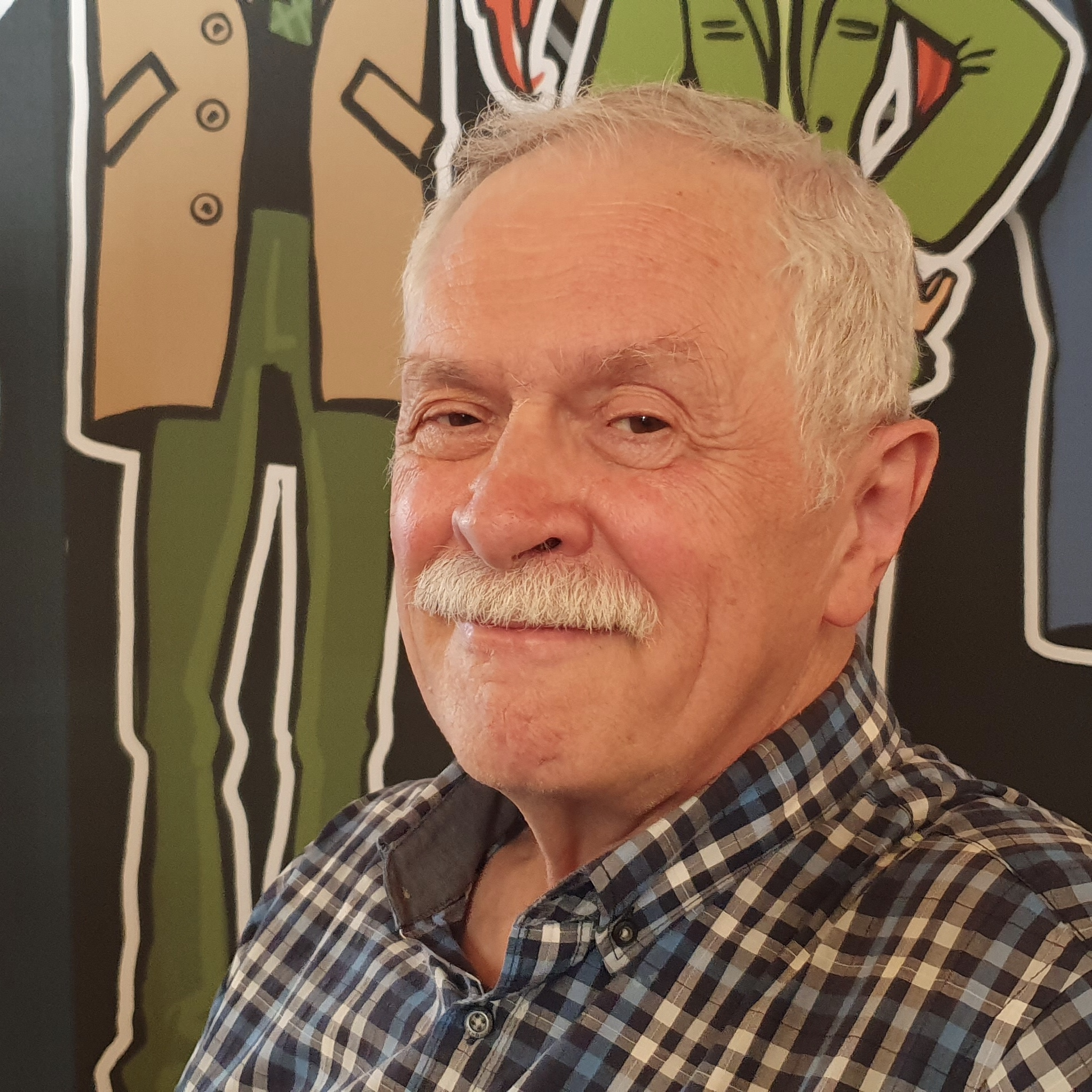
Wolfgang J. Fuchs in 2019

- 2 January – Veronika Fitz, actress (b. 1936).
- 4 January – Herbert Binkert, footballer (b. 1923).
- 5 January – Hans Tilkowski, footballer (b. 1935)
- 10 January – Wolfgang Dauner, jazz pianist (b. 1935)
- 11 January – Sabine Deitmer, author (b. 1947).
- 13 January – Sophie Kratzer, ice hockey forward (b. 1989).
- 16 January – Maik Hamburger, translator, writer and dramaturge (b. 1931).
- 20 January – Wolfgang J. Fuchs, author and journalist (b. 1945).
- 21 January
  - Herbert Baumann, composer (b. 1925).
  - Hermann Korte, academic specialising in German literature (b. 1949).
- 23 January – Gudrun Pausewang, writer (b. 1928)
- 24 January – Martin Matschinsky-Denninghoff, sculptor (b. 1921).
- 29 January
  - Othmar Mága, dirigent (b. 1929).
  - Christoph Meckel, author (b. 1935).

=== February ===
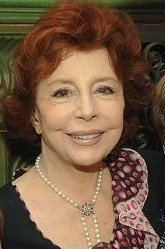
Sonja Ziemann in 2006

- 4 February – Volker David Kirchner, violist and composer (b. 1942).
- 7 February – Lucille Eichengreen, Holocaust survivor and memoirist (b. 1925).
- 8 February – Volker Spengler, actor (b. 1939).
- 9 February – Karl-Heinz Rädler, astrophysicist (b. 1935).
- 11 February – Joseph Vilsmaier, film director (b. 1939).
- 12 February – Hansjoachim Linde, inspector general (b. 1926).
- 14 February – Alwin Brück, politician (b. 1931).
- 15 February – Karl Ludwig Schweisfurth, businessman (b. 1930).
- 17 February
  - Ror Wolf, writer and poet (b. 1932).
  - Sonja Ziemann, actress (b. 1926).
- 20 February – Peter Dreher, painter (b. 1932).
- 26 February – Hans Deinzer, clarinetist (b. 1934).
- 27 February – Burkhard Driest, actor, writer and director (b. 1936).

=== March ===
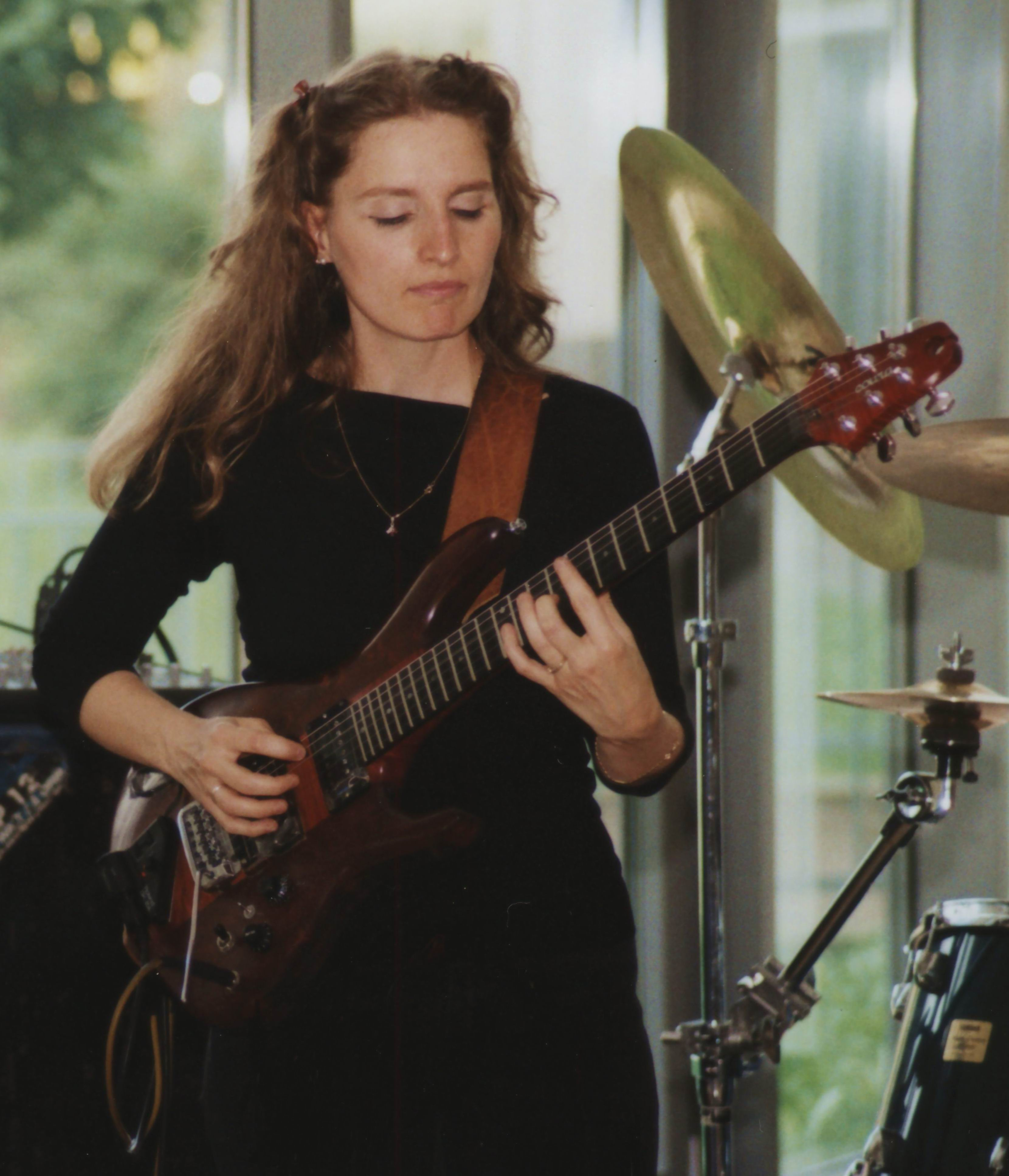
Susan Weinert in 2002

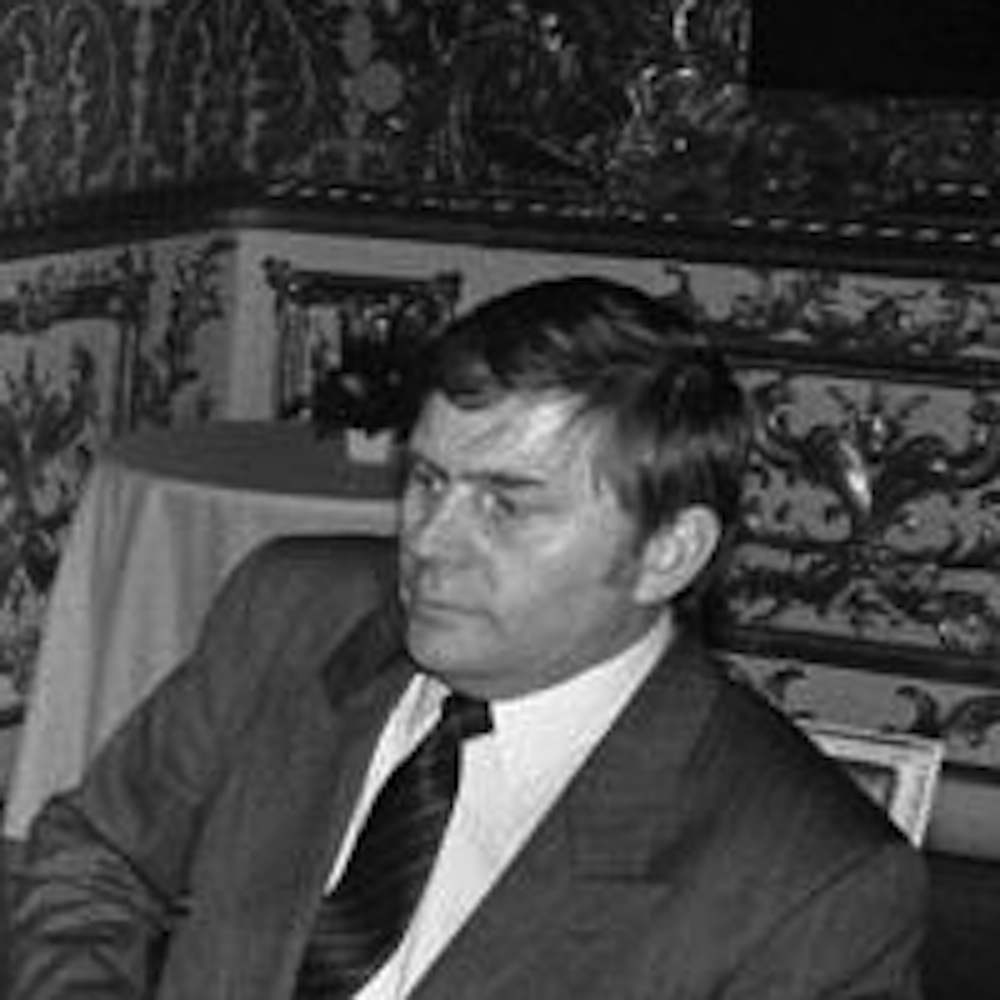
Alfred Gomolka

- 1 March – Carsten Bresch, physicist and geneticist (b. 1921).
- 2 March
  - Tabea Blumenschein, actress (b. 1952).
  - Viktor Josef Dammertz, Roman Catholic prelate (b. 1929).
  - Ulay, performance artist (b. 1943).
  - Susan Weinert, guitarist (b. 1965).
  - Peter Wieland, singer and entertainer (b. 1930).
- 3 March
  - Freimut Duve, politician and author (b. 1936).
  - Günther Müller, conductor (b. 1925).
- 9 March – Dietmar Rothermund, historian (b. 1933).
- 11 March – Burkhard Hirsch, politician (b. 1930).
- 12 March – Wolfgang Hofmann, judoka (b. 1941).
- 13 March – Giwi Margwelaschwili, German-Georgian writer and philosopher (b. 1927).
- 21 March – Hellmut Stern, violinist (b. 1928)
- 24 March – Alfred Gomolka, politician (CDU) (b. 1942).
- 26 March – Rolf Huisgen, chemist (b. 1920).
- 28 March – Thomas Schäfer, politician (b. 1966).
- 31 March – Reimar Lüst, astrophysicist (b. 1923).

=== April ===
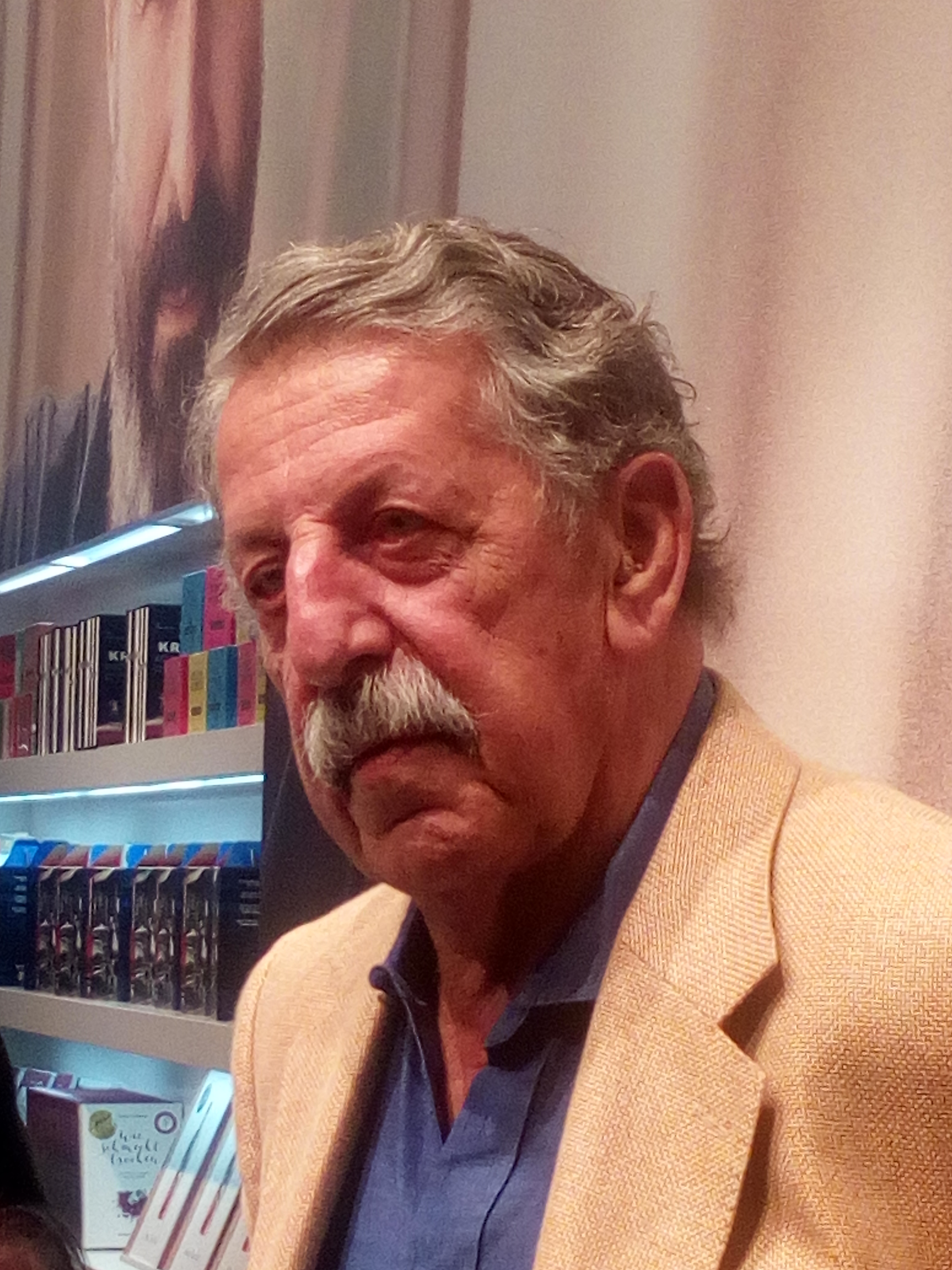
Ulrich Kienzle

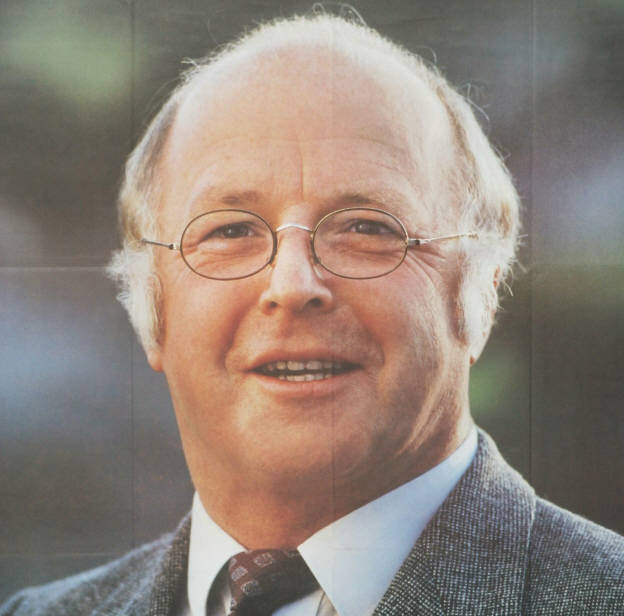
Norbert Blüm

- 1 April – Rüdiger Nehberg, human rights activist and survival expert (b. 1935).
- 2 April – Oskar Fischer, politician (b. 1923).
- 12 April – Sascha Hupmann, basketball player (b. 1970).
- 16 April – Ulrich Kienzle, journalist and author (b. 1936).
- 19 April – Margit Otto-Crépin, equestrian (b. 1945).
- 20 April – Hein Bollow, jockey (b. 1920)
- 21 April – Florian Schneider, musician (b. 1947)
- 22 April – Hartwig Gauder, race walker (b. 1954)
- 23 April – Norbert Blüm, politician (b. 1935).
- 30 April – Gerhard Zebrowski, footballer (b. 1940).

=== May ===
- 1 May
  - Judith Esser-Mittag, German gynecologist (b. 1921)
  - Sabine Zimmermann, TV host (b. 1951).
- 6 May – Herbert Frankenhauser, politician (CSU) (b. 1945).
- 8 May – Roy Horn, German-American magician and entertainer (b. 1944)
- 12 May
  - Astrid Kirchherr, photograph and artist (b. 1938)
  - Hans-Peter Naumann, philologist (b. 1933).
- 13 May – Rolf Hochhuth, author and playwright (b. 1931)
- 17 May
  - Hermann Fellner, politician (CSU) (b. 1952).
  - Hans-Joachim Gelberg, writer and publisher of children's books (b. 1930).
  - Peter Thomas, film music composer (b. 1925).
- 21 May – Julitta Münch, journalist (b. 1959).
- 25 May – Renate Krößner, actress (b. 1945).
- 26 May – Irm Hermann, actress (b. 1942).

=== June ===
- 1 June – Christoph Sydow, journalist (b. 1985).
- 5 June
  - Werner Böhm, musician and singer (b. 1941).
  - Friedrich Stelzner, academic surgeon, scientist and educator (b. 1921).
- 6 June – Dietmar Seyferth, chemist (b. 1929).
- 7 June – Bettina Heinen-Ayech, painter (b. 1937).
- 8 June – Klaus Berger, Roman Catholic theologian (b. 1940).
- 10 June
  - Hans Cieslarczyk, football player (b. 1937).
  - Hans Mezger, automobile engineer (b. 1929).
- 11 June – Hermann Salomon, javelin thrower (b. 1938).
- 15 June – Anton Schlembach, Roman Catholic bishop (b. 1932).
- 18 June
  - Claus Biederstaedt, actor (b. 1928).
  - Anna Blume, photograph (b. 1936).
- 25 June – Peter E. Toschek, experimental physicist (b. 1935).
- 26 June – Katrin Beinroth, judoka (b. 1981).
- 29 June – Gernot Endemann, film and television actor (b. 1942).
- 30 June – Ludwig Finscher, musicologist (b. 1930).

=== July ===
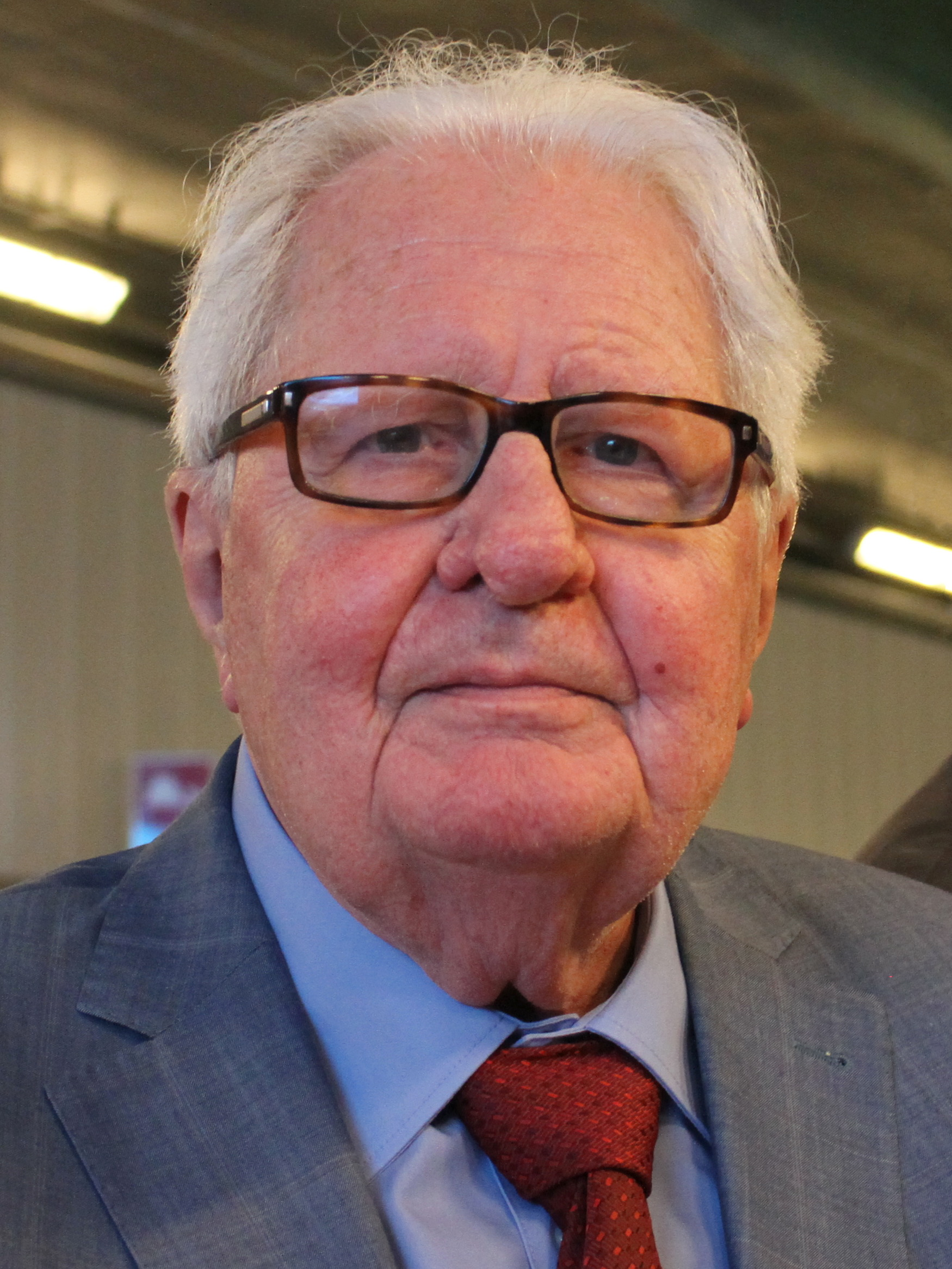
Hans-Jochen Vogel

- 1 July – Georg Ratzinger, Roman Catholic priest and musician (b. 1924).
- 2 July – Tilo Prückner, German television and film actor. (b. 1940)
- 5 July – Willi Holdorf, German football player (b. 1940)
- 26 July – Hans-Jochen Vogel, lawyer and politician (b. 1926).

=== August ===
- 3 August – Ralf Metzenmacher, German painter and designer (b. 1964)
- 7 August – Fred Stillkrauth, German actor (b. 1939)
- 13 August – Bernd Fischer, German mathematician (b. 1936)
- 16 August – Georg Volkert, German football player (b. 1945)
- 28 August
  - Wolfgang Stahl, German spectroscopist (b. 1956)
  - Uli Stein, German artist (b. 1946)
- 30 August – Ingrid Stahmer, German politician (SPD) (b. 1942)

=== September ===
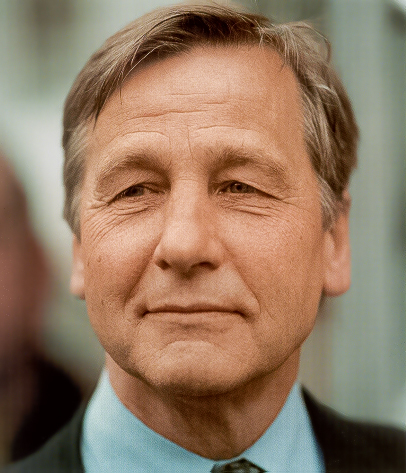
Wolfgang Clement

- 18 September – Joachim Kunert, German film director and screenwriter (b. 1929)
- 22 September – Michael Gwisdek, German actor and film director (b. 1942)
- 24 September – Gerry Weber, German designer and entrepreneur (b. 1941)
- 27 September – Wolfgang Clement, German politician (b. 1940)

=== October ===
- 1 October – Otfried Nassauer, German journalist (b. 1956)
- 2 October – Heinz Kördell, German football player (b. 1932)
- 4 October – Günter de Bruyn, German writer (b. 1926)
- 6 October
  - Folker Bohnet, German actor and theatre director (b. 1937)
  - Herbert Feuerstein, German comedian (b. 1937)
- 15 October – Tom Maschler, German-born British publisher, founder of the Booker Prize (b. 1933).
- 25 October – Thomas Oppermann, German politician (b. 1954)

=== November ===
- 14 November – Peter Pagé, German computer scientist (b. 1939)
- 15 November – Rudolf Kippenhahn, German astrophysicist (b. 1926)

=== December ===
- 12 December – Jack Steinberger, German-born American Nobel physicist (b. 1921)
