= 1942 in Germany =

- Decades: 1920s; 1930s; 1940s; 1950s; 1960s
- See also: Other events of 1942; History of Germany • Timeline • Years

Events in the year 1942 in Germany.

== Incumbents ==
=== National level ===
Head of State and Chancellor

- Adolf Hitler (the Führer) (Nazi Party)

== Events ==
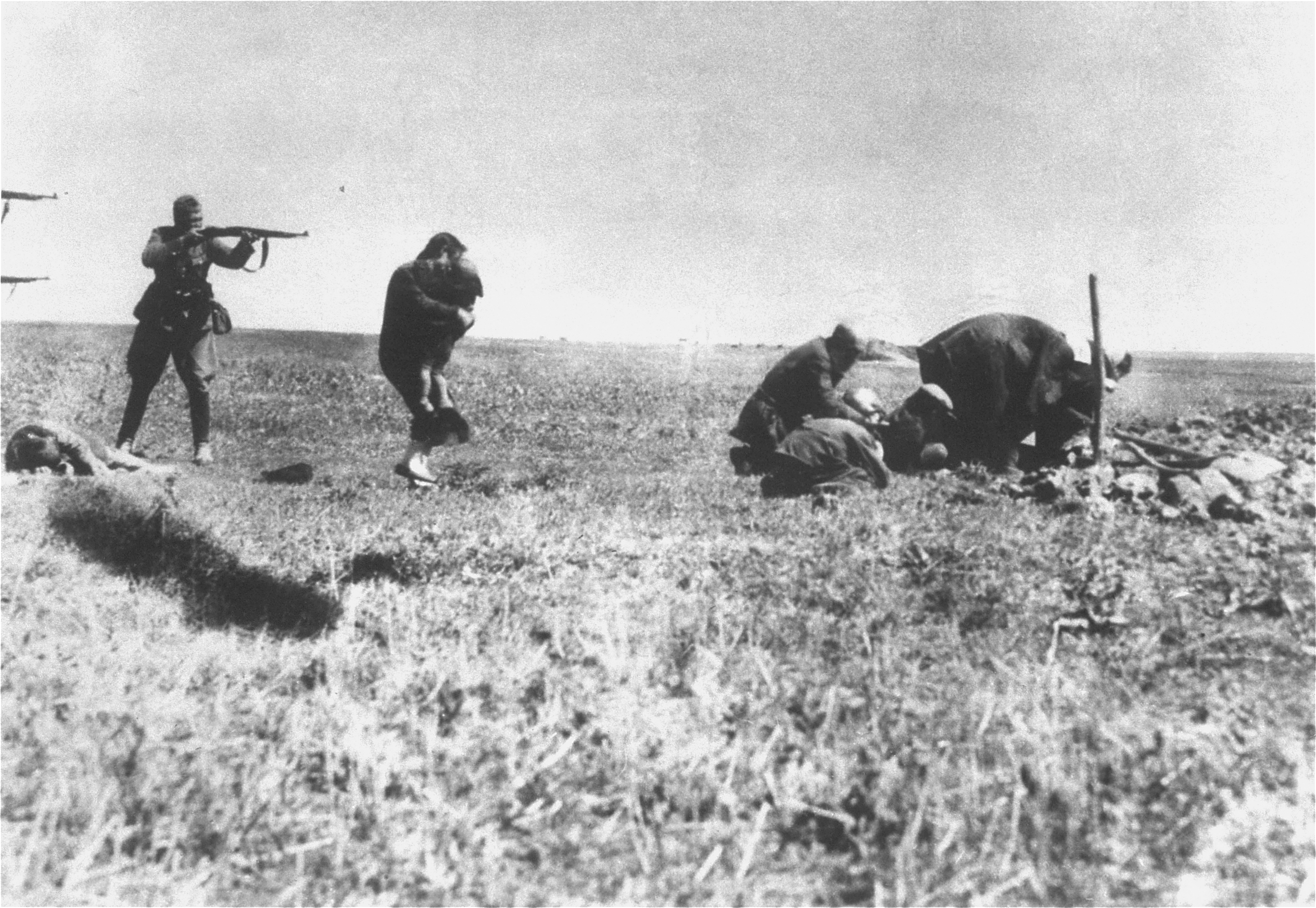
Executions of Kiev Jews by German army mobile killing units (Einsatzgruppen) near Ivangorod.

- 13 January — Heinkel test pilot Helmut Schenk becomes the first person to escape from a stricken aircraft with an ejection seat.
- 20 January — World War II: Nazis at the Wannsee Conference in Berlin decide that the "Final Solution to the Jewish problem" is deportation, and later extermination.
- 21 January — World War II: Erwin Rommel launches his new offensive in Cyrenaica.
- 3 February — World War II: Rommel suspends his offensive in Cyrenaica.
- 17 March — Holocaust: the Nazi German extermination camp Belzec opens in occupied Poland about 1 km south of the local railroad station of Belzec in the Lublin district of the General Government. Between March 1942 and December 1942, at least 434,508 people were killed there.
- 24 March - The deportation of Slovak Jews to Auschwitz begins.
- 27 March - The first French Jews are deported to Auschwitz.
- April — Holocaust: the Nazi German extermination camp Sobibor opens in occupied Poland on the outskirts of the village of Sobibór. Between April 1942 and October 1943, at least 160,000 people were killed in the camp.
- Spring — Holocaust: the Nazi German extermination camp Treblinka II opens in occupied Poland near the village of Treblinka. Between July 1942 and October 1943, around 850,000 people were killed there, more than 800,000 of whom were Jews.
- 12 May — World War II – Second Battle of Kharkov: In the eastern Ukraine, the Soviet Army initiates a major offensive. During the battle the Soviets capture the city of Kharkov from the German Army, only to be encircled and destroyed.
- 21 May — World War II: Mexico declares war against Germany after the sinking of the Mexican tanker Faja de Oro by the German U-boat, U-160, off Key West.
- 27 May — World War II – Operation Anthropoid: Czech paratroopers attempt to assassinate Reinhard Heydrich in Prague. He survives, but is seriously injured.
- 4 June — World War II: Reinhard Heydrich succumbs to wounds sustained on May 27 from Czechoslovak paratroopers acting in Operation Anthropoid.
- 4 June - World War II: Hitler and Mannerheim recording
- 9 June — World War II: Nazis burn the Czech village of Lidice in reprisal for the killing of Reinhard Heydrich.
- 10 June — World War II: The Gestapo massacres 173 male residents of Lidice, Czechoslovakia also in reprisal for the killing of Heydrich in the village.
- 11 June — Plans are made for the deportation of Jews from France, Belgium and the Netherlands.
- 23 June — The experimental early type of a nuclear reactor led to Leipzig L-IV experiment accident, becoming the first nuclear accident in history and consisting of steam explosion and reactor fire in Leipzig.
- 1 July — 27 July — World War II: the First Battle of El Alamein.
- 2 July — Soviet, American and British newspapers report that more than 1,000,000 Jews have already been exterminated by the Nazi regime across occupied Europe.
- 4 July — World War II: Twenty-four ships are sunk by German bombers and submarines after Convoy PQ 17 to the Soviet Union is scattered in the Arctic Ocean to evade the German battleship Tirpitz.
- 14 July — World War II: Germany introduces the Ostvolk Medal for Soviet personnel in Wehrmacht, on the same day that the first Dutch Jews are deported to Auschwitz.
- 18 July — World War II: Germany test flies the Messerschmitt Me 262 (using only its jet engines) for the first time.
- 19 July — World War II – Battle of the Atlantic: German Grand Admiral Karl Dönitz orders the last U-boats to withdraw from their United States Atlantic coast positions, in response to an effective American convoy system.
- 22 July — Holocaust: The systematic deportation of Jews from the Warsaw Ghetto begins, with many being transported to the new extermination camp at Treblinka.
- August - Deportation of Croatian Jews to Auschwitz begins.
- 22 August — Brazil breaks diplomatic relations and declares war on Germany and Italy.
- 30 August — Luxembourg is formally annexed to the German Reich.
- 31 August - 5 September — World War II: Battle of Alam Halfa
- 3 September — A German attempt to liquidate the Jewish ghetto in Lakhva leads to an uprising.
- 27 September — World War II – Both commerce raiding German auxiliary cruiser Stier and Liberty ship Stephen Hopkins sink following a gun battle in the South Atlantic. Stier is the only commerce raider to be sunk by Defensively Equipped Merchant Ships.
- 3 October — The first A-4 rocket is successfully launched from Test Stand VII at Peenemünde, Germany. The rocket flies 147 kilometers wide and reaches a height of 84.5 kilometers, becoming the first man-made object to reach space.
- 5 October - Himmler orders all Jews in concentration camps across Germany to be transferred to Auschwitz or Majdanek.
- 14 October — A German U-boat sinks the ferry SS Caribou, killing 137.
- 23 October—4 November – World War II – Second Battle of El Alamein: British troops go on the offensive against the Axis forces.
- 3 November — World War II – Second Battle of El Alamein: German forces under Erwin Rommel are forced to retreat during the night.
- 10 November — World War II: In violation of a 1940 armistice, Germany invades Vichy France, following French Admiral François Darlan's agreement to an armistice with the Allies in North Africa.
- 19 November — World War II – Battle of Stalingrad: Soviet Union forces under General Georgy Zhukov launch the Operation Uranus counter-attacks at Stalingrad, turning the tide of the battle in the USSR's favor.
- 22 November — World War II – Battle of Stalingrad: The situation for the German attackers of Stalingrad seems desperate during the Soviet counter-attack Operation Uranus, and General Friedrich Paulus sends Adolf Hitler a telegram saying that the German Sixth Army is surrounded.
- 23 November — A German U-boat sinks the SS Benlomond off the coast of Brazil. One crewman, a Chinese second steward named Poon Lim, is separated from the others and spends 130 days adrift until he is rescued on 3 April 1943.
- 28 December -
  - - Hitler orders Greece and Crete to be fortified and Balkan rebellions to be suppressed firmly and approves the withdrawal of Army Group A from the Caucasus.
  - - Sterilization experiments begin on women at Birkenau.

== Births ==
- 17 January — Ulf Hoelscher, German violinist
- 28 January — Hans Jürgen Bäumler, German figure skater, actor, pop singer and television host
- 21 February — Margarethe von Trotta, German actress, film director, and writer
- 28 March — Conrad Schumann, East German border guard (died 1998)
- 18 April — Jochen Rindt, German-born racing driver (died 1970)
- 22 April – Rudolf Jaenisch, German-American biologist
- 2 June — Thomas Danneberg, German actor (died 2023)
- 6 June - Klaus Bednarz, German journalist (died 2015)
- 12 June — Bert Sakmann, German physiologist, Nobel Prize in Physiology or Medicine laureate
- 23 June — Ute Walther, German mezzo-soprano (died 2026)
- 30 June — Claus Wisser, German businessman and philanthropist (died 2023)
- 5 July — Hannes Löhr, German football player
- 21 July — Alfred Gomolka, German politician
- 26 July – Hannelore Elsner, German actress (died 2019)
- 6 August — Evelyn Hamann, German actress (died 2007)
- 24 August — Hans Peter Korff, German actor (died 2025)
- 29 August — Gottfried John, German actor (died 2014)
- 5 September
  - Werner Herzog, German filmmaker
  - Norbert Trelle, German Roman Catholic prelate, Bishop of Hildesheim
- 9 September - Ted Herold, German rock and roll singer (died 2021)
- 12 September - Carola von Braun, German politician (died 2026)
- 15 September - Thomas Astan, German Roman Catholic priest and actor (died 2024)
- 16 September - Ingrid Stahmer, German politician (died 2020)
- 18 September
  - Gerhard Kentschke, German football player and coach
  - Wolfgang Schäuble, German politician (died 2023)
- 20 September - Jürgen Hart, German cabaret performer (died 2002)
- 25 September - Volker Rühe, German politician
- 26 September - Ingrid Becker, German athlete
- 1 October — Gunther Wallraff, German investigative journalist
- 20 October
  - Christel DeHaan, German-American businesswoman and philanthropist (died 2020)
  - Christiane Nüsslein-Volhard, German biologist, recipient of the Nobel Prize in Physiology or Medicine
- 21 November - Heidemarie Wieczorek-Zeul, German politician
- 25 November - Rosa von Praunheim, German film director, author and painter
- 2 December - Ulrich Wickert, German journalist
- 3 December - Alice Schwarzer, German feminist and publisher

== Deaths ==
- 26 January — Felix Hausdorff, German mathematician (born 1868)
- 8 February — Fritz Todt, German engineer (born 1891)
- 12 March - Robert Bosch, German industrialist (born 1861)
- 14 March — Friedrich Karl Georg Fedde, German botanist (born 1873)
- 3 August - Richard Willstätter, German chemist (born 1872)
- 30 August — Martin Kirschner, German surgeon (born 1879)
- 1 November — Hugo Distler, German composer (born 1908)
- 3 December — Henner Henkel, German tennis champion (born 1915)
- 22 December — Kurt Schumacher, German sculptor (born 1905)
