= 1940 in Germany =

- Decades: 1920s; 1930s; 1940s; 1950s; 1960s
- See also: Other events of 1940; History of Germany • Timeline • Years

Events in the year 1940 in Germany.

== Incumbents ==
=== National level ===
Head of State and Chancellor

- Adolf Hitler (the Führer) (Nazi Party)

== Events ==
=== January ===
- 4 January – World War II: (Axis powers): Luftwaffe General Hermann Göring assumes control of most war industries in Germany.
- 10 January – World War II: Mechelen Incident: A German plane carrying secret plans for the invasion of western Europe makes a forced landing in Belgium, leading to mobilization of defense forces in the Low Countries.

=== February ===
- 16 February – World War II: Altmark Incident: The British destroyer HMS Cossack pursues the German tanker Altmark into the Jøssingfjorden in southwestern Norway.

=== March ===
- 18 March – World War II: Axis powers: Adolf Hitler and Benito Mussolini meet at Brenner Pass in the Alps and agree to form an alliance against France and the United Kingdom.
- 31 March – World War II: Commerce raiding hilfskreuzer Atlantis, leaves the Wadden Sea for what will become the longest warship cruise of the war. (622 days without in-port replenishment or repair).

=== April ===
- 9 April
  - World War II: Germany carries out Operation Weserübung, and invades Denmark and Norway. German forces land in several Norwegian ports and take Oslo; The Norwegian Campaign lasts two months. The Allied campaign in Norway is simultaneously commenced.
  - German invasion of Norway: German heavy cruiser Blücher is sunk by gunfire and torpedoes from the Norwegian coastal fortress Oscarsborg in the Oslofjord. Of the 2,202 German crew and troops on board, some 830 died (at least 320 of them crewmen). Most either drowned or burnt to death in the flaming oil slick surrounding the wreck.
- 20 April – On his 51st birthday, Hitler orders the formation of a new SS regiment, containing Norwegians and Danes as well as Germans.

=== May ===
- 10 May – World War II: Battle of France begins – German forces invade Low Countries.
- 13 May – World War II: German armies open a 60-mile (97 km) wide breach in the Maginot Line at Sedan, France.
- 13–14 May – Rotterdam is subjected to savage terror bombing by the Luftwaffe; 980 are killed, and 20,000 buildings destroyed.
- 17 May – Brussels falls to German forces.
- 20 May
  - World War II: German forces (2nd Panzer division), under General Rudolf Veiel, reach Noyelles on the English Channel.
  - Holocaust: The Nazi German concentration and extermination camp Auschwitz-Birkenau, the largest of the German concentration camps, opens in occupied Poland near the town of Oświęcim. Between May 1940 and January 1945, around 1.1 million people were killed there.

=== June ===
- 3 June
  - The Holocaust: Nazi leader Franz Rademacher proposes the Madagascar Plan, under which the Jewish population of Europe would be relocated to the island of Madagascar.
  - World War II: Paris is bombed by the Luftwaffe for the first time.
- 10 June – World War II: Norway surrenders to German forces.
- 14 June – World War II: Fall of Paris to German occupation.
- 15 June – World War II: Verdun falls to German forces.
- 17 June – A Luftwaffe Junkers Ju 88 bomber sinks the British ship RMS Lancastria, which was evacuating troops from near Saint-Nazaire, France, killing some 5,800 men. (Wartime censorship prevents the story from becoming public.)
- 21 June – World War II: Vichy France and Germany sign an armistice at Compiegne, in the same wagon-lit railroad car used by Marshal Ferdinand Foch to accept the surrender of Germany in 1918.
- 23 June – World War II: German leader Adolf Hitler surveys newly defeated Paris in now occupied France.
- 30 June – World War II: German forces land in Guernsey, marking the start of the 5-year Occupation of the Channel Islands.

=== July ===
- 14 July – World War II: Winston Churchill, in a worldwide broadcast, proclaims the intention of Great Britain to fight alone against Germany whatever the outcome.
- 19 July – World War II: Adolf Hitler promotes 12 generals to field marshal during the 1940 Field Marshal Ceremony following the swift victory over France, and makes a peace appeal to Britain in an address to the Reichstag. Lord Halifax, British foreign minister, flatly rejects peace terms in a broadcast reply on 22 July.

=== August ===
- 8 August – World War II: Wilhelm Keitel signs the "Aufbau Ost" directive, which eventually leads to the invasion of the Soviet Union.
- 30 August – Second Vienna Award: Germany and Italy compel Romania to cede half of Transylvania to Hungary.

=== September ===
- 5 September – World War II: Commerce raiding hilfskreuzer Komet enters the Pacific Ocean via the Bering Strait after crossing the Arctic Ocean from the North Sea with the help of Soviet icebreakers Lenin, Stalin, and Kaganovich.
- 7 September – World War II: The Blitz – Germany begins to rain bombs on London (the first of 57 consecutive nights of strategic bombing).
- 22 September – The first flight of Heinkel He 280 occurs.
- 27 September – World War II: Germany, Italy and Japan sign the Tripartite Pact.

=== October ===
- 18–19 October – World War II: Thirty-two ships are sunk from Convoy SC 7 and Convoy HX 79 by the most effective wolfpack of the war including Kretschmer, Prien and Schepke.

=== November ===
- 11 November – World War II: The German Hilfskreuzer (commerce raider) Atlantis captures top secret British mail, and sends it to Japan.
- 14 November – World War II: The city of Coventry, England is destroyed by 500 German Luftwaffe bombers (150,000 fire bombs, 503 tons of high explosives, and 130 parachute mines level 60,000 of the city's 75,000 buildings; 568 people are killed).
- 16 November – World War II: In response to Germany levelling Coventry 2 days before, the Royal Air Force begins to bomb Hamburg (by war's end, 50,000 Hamburg residents will have died from Allied attacks).
- 18 November – World War II: German leader Adolf Hitler and Italian Foreign Minister Galeazzo Ciano meet to discuss Benito Mussolini's disastrous invasion of Greece.

=== December ===
- 12 December & 15 December — World War II: "Sheffield Blitz" – The City of Sheffield is badly damaged by German air-raids.
- 16 December – World War II: Operation Abigail Rachel – RAF bombing of Mannheim.
- 29 December – World War II: Luftwaffe carries out a massive incendiary bombing raid on London, UK, starting 1,500 fires. Many famous buildings, including the Guildhall and Trinity House, are either damaged or destroyed.
4 June: German troops on parade after the surrender of Paris

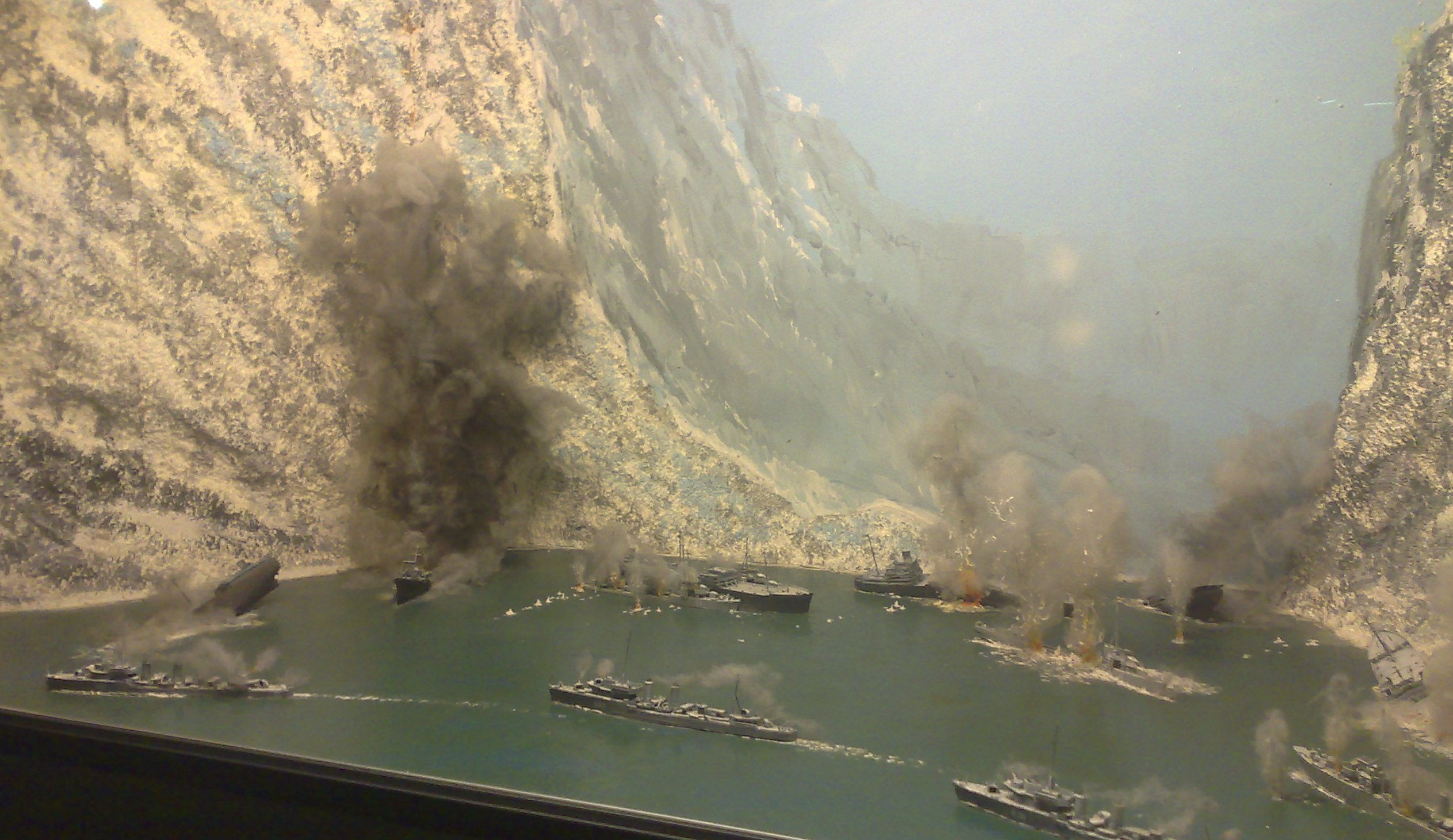
British destroyers attack the German fleet during the Battle of Narvik

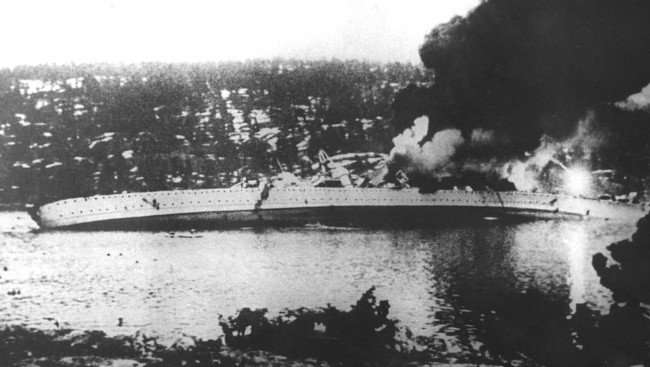
9 April: the German ship "Blücher" is sunk by the Norwegian shore defences at the Battle of Drøbak Sound.

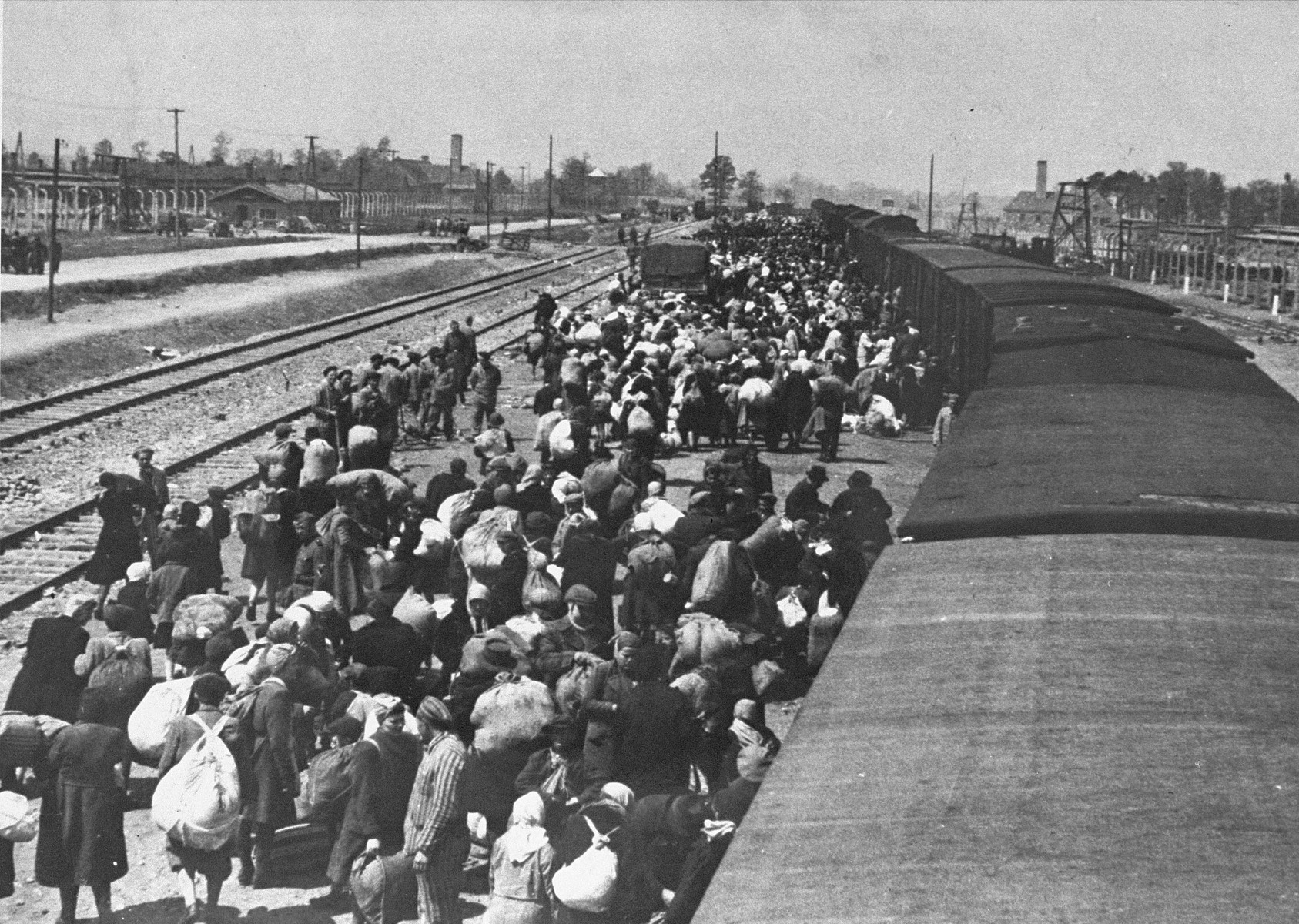
20 May: The Nazi German concentration and extermination camp Auschwitz-Birkenau opens in occupied Poland

=== Date unknown ===
- In 1940, German optometrist Heinrich Wöhlk invented plastic Contact lenses.
- Hülsta (hülsta-werke Hüls GmbH & Co. KG), a German furniture manufacturer is founded in Stadtlohn.

== Births ==
- 4 January — Helmut Jahn, German architect (died 2021)
- 14 January — Siegmund Nimsgern, German bass-baritone (died 2025)
- 16 January — Franz Müntefering, German politician
- 22 January - Eberhard Weber, German double bassist and composer
- 23 January - Armin Maiwald, German author, television director and producer
- 24 January — Joachim Gauck, President of Germany
- 28 January - Bernd Klingner, German sport shooter
- 31 January - Werner Franke, German biologist (died 2022)
- 9 February — Hubert Burda, German publisher
- 17 February
  - Willi Holdorf, German athlete (died 2020)
  - Winfried Hassemer, German judge (died 2014)
- 18 February - Peter Meyer, German footballer (died 2026)
- 19 February - Renate Hellwig, German politician
- 20 February - Christoph Eschenbach, German conductor
- 29 February - Margit Carstensen, German actress (died 2023)
- 2 March — Lothar de Maizière, German politician
- 4 March — Wolfgang Hoffmann-Riem, German judge
- 7 March — Rudi Dutschke, German radical student leader (died 1979)
- 16 March — Claus Offe, German sociologist (died 2025)
- 17 March — Gottfried Münzenberg, German chemist (died 2024)
- 21 March — Paul Friedrichs German motocross racer (died 2012)
- 26 March — Victor von Halem, German operatic bass (died 2022)
- 4 April — Michael Ruetz, German photographer (died 2024)
- 19 April — Reinhard Bonnke, German Pentecostal evangelist (died 2019)
- 22 April — Berndt Seite, German politician
- 3 May — Conny Plank, German musician (died 1987)
- 18 May – Anita Kupsch, German actress (died 2025)
- 7 June — Lambert Hamel, German actor (died 2026)
- 11 June — Volkmar Sigusch, German sexologist, physician and sociologist (died 2023)
- 15 June — Franz Wegner, German physicist
- 20 June — Eugen Drewermann, German theologian
- 21 June
  - Brigitte Boehme, German lawyer and church administrator in Bremen
  - Notker Wolf, German monk (died 2024)
- 22 June — Egon Henninger, German Olympic swimmer (died 2025)
- 25 June — Peer Augustinski, German actor and comedian (died 2014)
- 7 July
  - Wolfgang Clement, German politician (died 2020)
  - Rosel Zech, German actress (died 2011)
- 26 July
  - Jürgen Kesting, German journalist and music critic (died 2026)
  - Jürgen Kurbjuhn, German footballer (died 2014)
- 27 July — Pina Bausch, German choreographer (died 2009)
- 7 August — Martin Heisenberg, German neurobiologist
- 9 August — Marie-Luise Marjan, German actress
- 13 August — Dirk Sager, German journalist (died 2014)
- 15 August — Dietmar Schwager, German football player (died 2018)
- 18 August — Sigrid Metz-Göckel, German sociologist (died 2025)
- 25 August — Wilhelm von Homburg, German boxer, actor and wrestler (died 2004)
- 25 September — Werner Münch, German politician
- 27 September — Rudolph Moshammer, German fashion designer (died 2005)
- 1 October — Gertrude Degenhardt, German artist (died 2025)
- 2 October — Werner Dörflinger, German politician (died 2021)
- 18 October — Ruth Wagner, German politician (died 2025)
- 26 October — Tilo Prückner, German actor (died 2020)
- 29 October — Heinrich Mussinghoff, German bishop of Roman Catholic Church
- 2 November — Carolin Reiber, German television presenter
- 15 November — Klaus Ampler, German cyclist (died 2016)
- 22 November — Frank Duval, German composer, conductor, songwriter and singer
- 24 November — Hermann Otto Solms, German politician
- 7 December — Klaus Tschira, German entrepreneur (died 2015)
- 12 December — Ulla Wiesner, German singer
- 18 December — Klaus Wennemann, German actor (died 2000)
- 22 December — Eberhard Schöler, German table tennis player
- 29 December — Brigitte Kronauer, German writer (died 2019)
- 30 December — Renate Jaeger, German judge

== Deaths ==
- 2 January — Albert Richter, German cyclist (born 1912)
- 2 February — Carl Grünberg, German philosopher (born 1861)
- 9 February — William Dodd, United States Ambassador to Germany from 1933 to 1937, historian and author (born 1869)
- 27 February — Peter Behrens, German architect (born 1868)
- 29 February — Josef Swickard, German actor (born 1866)
- 3 March — Karl Muck, German conductor (born 1859)
- 15 March — Robert Leffler, German actor and singer (born 1866)
- 20 March — Alfred Ploetz, German physician, biologist, and eugenicist (born 1860)
- 25 April
  - Otto Hintze, German historian (born 1861)
  - Wilhelm Dörpfeld, German architect and archaeologist (born 1853)
- 26 April — Carl Bosch, German chemist and Nobel Prize laureate (born 1874)
- 26 May — Prince Wilhelm of Prussia (born 1906)
- 6 June — Arthur Zimmermann, German diplomat (born 1864)
- 22 June — Walter Hasenclever, German poet and playwright (born 1890)
- 5 July — Friedrich Robert von Beringe, German army officer (born 1865)
- 19 July — Max Bodenheimer, lawyer (born 1865)
- 21 July — Elisabeth von Eicken, painter (born 1862)
- 1 August — Paul Hirsch, German politician (born 1868)
- 24 August — Paul Nipkow, German technician and inventor (born 1860)
- 26 September — Walter Benjamin, German philosopher and cultural critic (born 1892)
- 11 October – Adolf von Trotha, German admiral (born 1868)
- 28 November — Helmut Wick, wing commander in the Luftwaffe (born 1915)
- 1 December — Johann Viktor Bredt, German jurist and politician (born 1879)
- 3 December — Wolff von Stutterheim, Wehrmacht general and Knight's Cross recipient (born 1893)
- 11 December — Fritz Erler, German painter (born 1868)
