= Tomorrow's Dream =

Tomorrow's Dream may refer to:

- "Tomorrow's Dream", a 1969 song by Al Green from Green Is Blues
- "Tomorrow's Dream", a 1972 song by Jackie Cain and Roy Kral from Time & Love
- "Tomorrow's Dream", a 1972 song by Black Sabbath from Vol. 4
- "Tomorrow's Dream", a 1981 song by Madness from 7
- Tomorrow's Dream, a 1998 jazz album by David Friesen
- Tomorrow's Dream, a 1998 novel by T. Davis Bunn and Janette Oke
- Tomorrow's Dream, a 2010 novel by Susan Weinert
