= Martin Schoell =

German geochemist

- Education: LMU Munich; Clausthal University
- Awards: 2008 Alfred Treibs Award 1995 AAPG Best Paper Award
- Scientific career
- Fields: Geochemistry
- Workplaces: German Geological Survey Chevron Oil Field Research Company (1984-2001) GasConsult International, Inc. (2001-2015) GasXapse (2019-current)

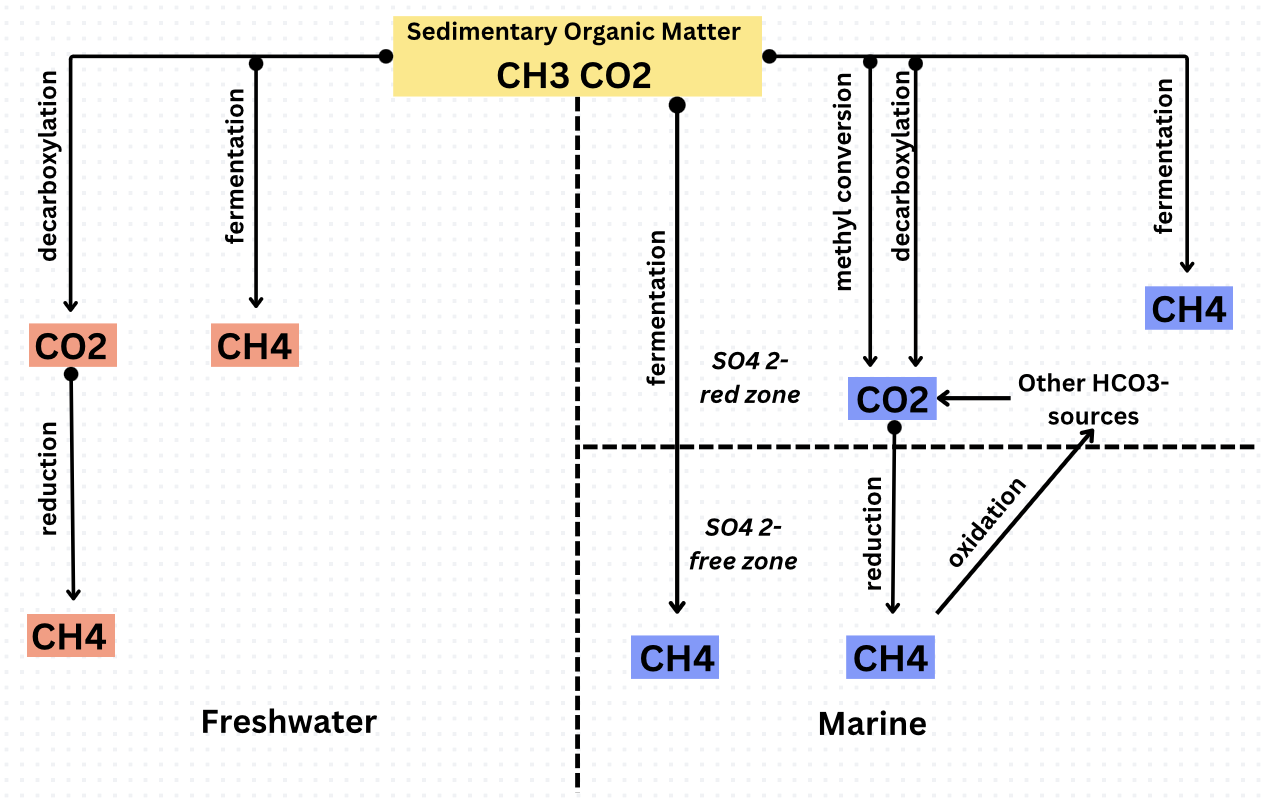
Pathways of methane formation in freshwater and marine environments via acetate fermentation and carbon dioxide reduction as described by Martin Schoell in "Biogenic methane formation in marine and freshwater environments: CO_{2} reduction vs. acetate fermentation".

Martin Schoell is a German geochemist. His research focuses on using stable isotopes to characterize the geochemistry of petroleum. Schoell is known for his work regarding CO_{2}, sedimentary rocks, methane, natural gas, carbon isotopes, and acetate fermentation and how these factors enable identification of the origins of greenhouse gasses. Schoell was the founder, CEO and president of Gas Consult International, Inc., a private natural gas consulting firm, from 2001 to 2015. Schoell was awarded the Alfred Treibs Award by the Geochemical Society in 2008.

== Education ==
Martin Schoell attended LMU Munich for his undergraduate career in 1961 and in 1964 attended Clausthal University, Germany for graduate school where he obtained a PhD in geochemistry. While at Clausthal University, in 1966 Schoell delivered his Diplomarbeit (Master's Thesis) on the geochemistry of strontium in a deposit of barite. Later, in 1981, Schoell continued his education in Germany by obtaining his Habilitation (the highest possible academic degree offered in German academia). Schoell was mentored by Wolfgang Stahl, who inspired Schoell's interest in hydrogen isotope geochemistry with respect to natural gas research.

== Career ==
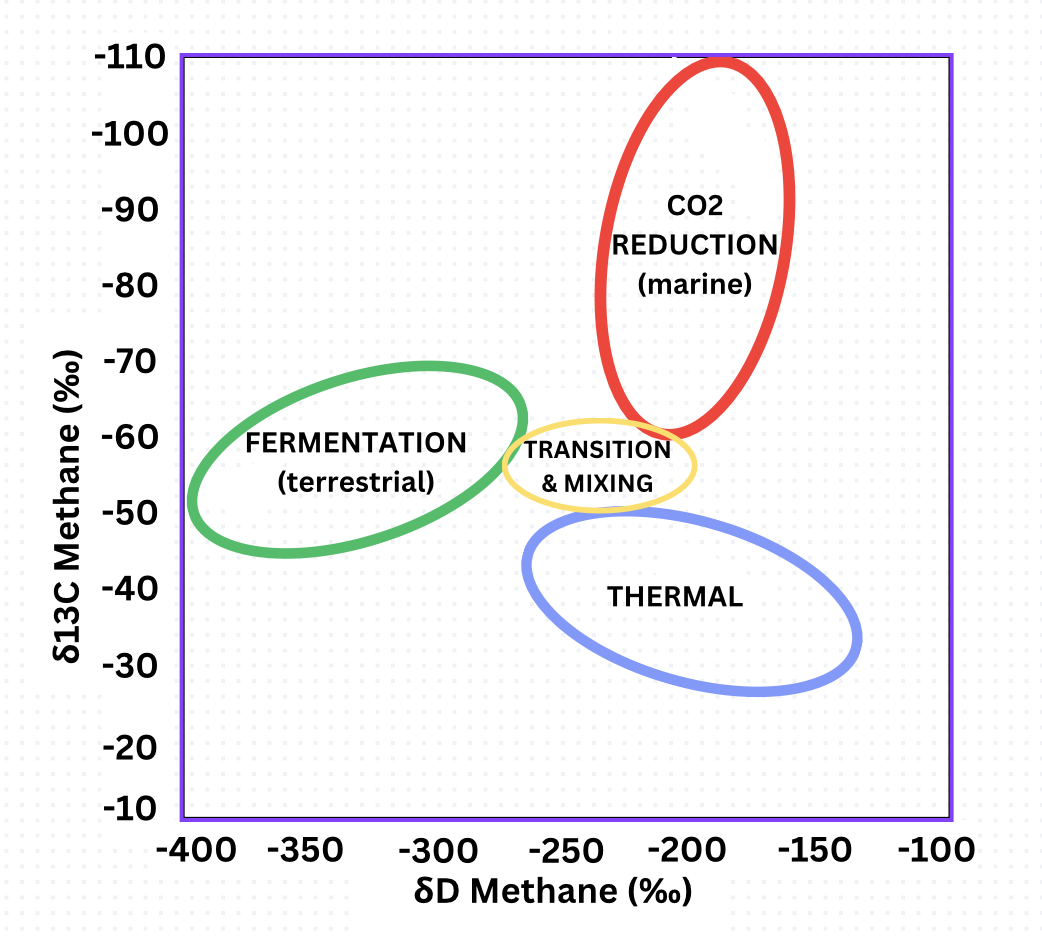
Shown is a map which can be used to classify a natural gas based on the δ13C and δD content of methane in the sample as suggested by the work of Martin Schoell in his work "Biogenic methane formation in marine and freshwater environments: CO_{2} reduction vs. acetate fermentation--Isotope Evidence".

Following his completion of his PhD, Schoell began working for the German Geological Survey focusing on hyper saline hydrothermal vents in the Red Sea. From 1984 to 2001, Schoell worked for Chevron Oil Field Research Company in La Habra. During this time, he published his most cited paper, "Biogenic methane formation in marine and freshwater environments: CO_{2} reduction vs. acetate fermentation—Isotope evidence". In this paper, Schoell et al. discussed how hydrogen and carbon isotope composition analysis can be used to identify different biogenic methane production pathways from its water and CO_{2} precursors. This paper went on to win the 1995 AAPG Best Paper Award. In addition to this, while working for Chevron in 1984 Schoell requested funding from Chevron to fund John Hayes of Indiana University to develop continuous-flow compound-specific isotope analysis. This development allowed Schoell to make a variety of discoveries including the ability of steranes and hopanes in the Lacustrine Green River Formation could be used as a proxy for water paleo-depths.

During his time with Chevron, Schoell introduced Mudgas isotope analysis to Chevron and the natural gas industry, and worked in a variety of international locations including locations throughout the Americas, Southeast Asia and Africa as well as parts of Oceania.

In 2001, Schoell went on to establish a natural gas consulting company, GasConsult International, Inc. of which he was the CEO and president of until 2015. GasConsult specializes in ZR-LNG (zero-refrigeration liquified natural gas), LH2 (liquid hydrogen) and OHL (optimized liquid hydrogen) technologies and offers clients opportunities to transition to these technologies, and is now under the direction of Bill Howe.

In 2019, Schoell founded GasXpse which applies geochemical fundamentals to provide natural gas related consulting services and provide scientific advising for natural gas-related subjects. Further, Schoell has co-authored 76 publications in the field of geochemistry.

== Research ==
Schoell has made many contributions to geochemistry with emphasis on the applications of stable isotope analysis. The results of Schoell's work have included identifying the pathways of formation that distinguish methane of biogenic origin from that of thermogenic origin using stable isotope analysis. In the paper, "Biogenic methane formation in marine and freshwater environments: CO_{2} reduction VS. acetate fermentation-Isotope evidence", Schoell et al. identify that the two primary methods for aquatic and marine methane production are carbon dioxide reduction and acetate fermentation, respectively. By recognizing the difference in δ^{13}C and δD fractionation of the water environments and observing the differences in δ^{13}C and δD fractionations of the methane product, Schoell et al. concluded that the dominant pathway of methane in marine environments is via acetate fermentation, while methane in freshwater environments arises from CO_{2} reduction. By analyzing the CH_{4} and H_{2}O fractionation, Schoell, et al. offer a technique for identifying the original environment in which methane was produced.

Schoell continued his work with methane origin studies expanding his research to consider how stable isotopes can provide insight regarding the temperature of the environment for both thermogenic and biogenic methane production. Specifically, Schoell collaborated on the paper "Formation temperatures of thermogenic and biogenic methane" authored by D. Stolper, which used "clustered isotope" techniques to determine the temperature at which methane was produced. This approach has become useful for identifying the thermal conditions of methane formation for both the high temperatures of thermogenic methane production and the relatively lower temperatures of microbial methane production as well as characterizing the contribution of both producers to a mixed sample.

While the majority of Schoell's work has revolved around identifying the origins and pathways of methane production, he has also done work using stable isotope analysis to address how environmental factors affect preservable products of biological activity. Schoell addresses this topic in the paper, "Sensitivity of biomarker properties to depositional environment and/or source input in the Lower Toarcian of SW-Germany". In addition to this, his career has included the research of how stable isotope analysis can be used to identify the mixing and composition of natural gasses, as discussed in "Use of Gas Isotope Analyses for Reservoir Management".

== Personal life ==
Schoell was born in Germany, although the bulk of his career and adult life he has spent in the United States. Since retiring, Schoell resides in California. Aside from his research, Schoell has experience in winemaking.

== Awards ==
Schoell received the 1995 AAPG Best Paper Award and was recognized by the American Association of Petroleum Geologists as authoring one of the top twenty most notable geology-related papers of the 1980s. Specifically, the AAPG recognized Schoell for his paper "Genetic Characterization of Natural Gasses" which describes how the correlation between C_{2+} concentration, the variation of carbon and hydrogen isotopes in methane, and carbon isotope variation in ethane can be used to qualitatively characterize the composition of natural gasses.

In 2008, Schoell received the annual Alfred Treibs Award. This award is given on a yearly basis by the Geochemical Society in recognition of scientists whose research has made significant contributions to the understanding of geochemical processes. Schoell received this honour in response to his work with stable isotope analyses which revolutionized fossil fuel research and greenhouse gas tracing.
