= Aufbau Ost =

Aufbau Ost (German for: [re-]building [up] the East) may refer to:

- Aufbau Ost (1940), a Nazi military plan;
- "Aufbau Ost", a term for the economic challenge which Germany faced after its 1990 reunification.
