= Thomas Astan =

German Roman Catholic priest and actor (1942–2024)

- Born: 15 September 1942; Schmallenberg, Gau Westphalia-South, Germany
- Died: 11 October 2024 (aged 82); Soyen, Bavaria, Germany
- Occupations: Roman Catholic priest Actor

Thomas Astan (15 September 1942 – 11 October 2024) was a German Roman Catholic priest and actor.

== Biography ==
Born in Schmallenberg on 15 September 1942, Astan appeared in television series such as Der Kommissar, The Old Fox, and Derrick. However, in 1996 he was ordained a Catholic priest and joined the Salesians of Don Bosco. He became a member of the Künstlerseelsorge of the Archdiocese of Berlin in 1999, a position he left in 2015. He also directed Sunday school at the church of Saint Thomas Aquinas in Mitte. In 2015, he joined the Benediktbeuern Abbey and taught at the Zentrum für Umwelt und Kultur Benediktbeuern. He was also president of the Impulse für die Straßenkinder e. V.

Astan died in Soyen on 11 October 2024, at the age of 82.

== Filmography ==
- Der Tod läuft hinterher (1967)
- Der Kommissar (1969–1976)
- Tatort (1974–1986)
- Derrick (1975–1991)
- The Old Fox (1977–1984)
- Notarztwagen 7 (1977)
