= 1941 in Germany =

- Decades: 1920s; 1930s; 1940s; 1950s; 1960s
- See also: Other events of 1941; History of Germany • Timeline • Years

Events in the year 1941 in Germany.

== Incumbents ==
=== National level ===
Head of State and Chancellor

- Adolf Hitler (the Führer) (Nazi Party)

== Events ==
=== January ===
- 3 January — A decree in Germany outlaws the use of Blackletter Gothic typefaces in favour of Antiqua, thus putting an end to the Antiqua–Fraktur dispute.

=== February ===
- 3 February — The Nazis forcibly restore Pierre Laval to office in occupied Vichy France.
- 12 February — Erwin Rommel arrives in Tripoli.
- 19 February - 22 February — Three Nights' Blitz over Swansea, South Wales: Over these 3 nights of intensive bombing, which last a total of 13 hours and 48 minutes, Swansea's town centre is almost completely obliterated by the 896 high explosive bombs employed by the Luftwaffe. 230 deaths and 397 casualties reported.

=== March ===
- 24 March — Rommel launches his first offensive in Cyrenaica.

=== April ===
- 6 April — Germany invades Yugoslavia and Greece.
- 12 April — German troops enter Belgrade.
- 27 April — German troops enter Athens.

=== May ===
- 9 May — The German submarine U-110 is captured by the British Royal Navy. On board is the latest Enigma cryptography machine, which Allied cryptographers later use to break coded German messages.
- 10 May — The British House of Commons is damaged by the Luftwaffe in an air raid.
- 12 May — Konrad Zuse presents the Z3, the world's first working programmable, fully automatic computer, in Berlin.
- 20 May — The Battle of Crete begins as Germany launches an airborne invasion of Crete.
- 24 May — In the North Atlantic, the German battleship Bismarck sinks battlecruiser HMS Hood, killing all but 3 crewmen aboard the pride of the Royal Navy.
- 26 May — In the North Atlantic, Fairey Swordfish aircraft from the carrier HMS Ark Royal cripple the steering of Bismarck in an aerial torpedo attack.
- 27 May — Bismarck is sunk in the North Atlantic, killing 2,000+

=== June ===
- 14 June — All German and Italian assets in the United States are frozen.
- 16 June — All German and Italian consulates in the United States are ordered closed and their staffs to leave the country by 10 July.
- 22 June — Germany invades the Soviet Union under Operation Barbarossa.

=== July ===
- 4 July — The mass murder of Polish scientists and writers is committed by German troops in the captured Polish city of Lwów.
- 5 July — German troops reach the Dnieper River.
- 7 July — German troops take over Estonia from the Soviets
- 25 July — The Postal Code system is introduced for the first time in Germany.
- 31 July — Under instructions from Adolf Hitler, Nazi official Hermann Göring orders S.S. General Reinhard Heydrich to "submit to me as soon as possible a general plan of the administrative material and financial measures necessary for carrying out the desired Final Solution of the Jewish question", starting the Holocaust.

=== August ===
- 18 August — Adolf Hitler orders a temporary halt to Nazi Germany's systematic euthanasia of the mentally ill and handicapped due to protests. However, graduates of the T-4 Euthanasia Program are then transferred to concentration camps, where they continue in their trade.
- 22 August — The German Occupation Authority in France announces that anyone found either working for or aiding the Free French will be sentenced to death.
- 23 August - Hitler orders the end of the Action T4 programme, which has seen the euthanasia of up to 100,000 people with physical and mental disabilities.
- 24 August — A Luftwaffe bomb hits an Estonian steamer Eestirand with 3,500 Soviet-mobilized Estonian men on board, killing 598 of them.

=== September ===
- 6 September — The requirement to wear the Star of David with the word "Jew" inscribed, is extended to all Jews over the age of 6 in German-occupied areas.
- 8 September — The Siege of Leningrad begins: German forces begin a siege against the Soviet Union's second-largest city, Leningrad.
- 15 September — The Estonian Self-Administration, headed by Hjalmar Mäe, is appointed by the German military administration.
- 22 September — The town of Reshetylivka in the Soviet Union is occupied by German forces.
- 29 September - 30 September — Babi Yar massacre – German troops, assisted by Ukrainian police and local collaborators, killed 33,771 Jews of Kiev, Ukraine.

=== October ===
- 1 October — The Nazi German extermination camp Konzentrationslager Lublin (commonly known as "Majdanek") opens in occupied Poland on the outskirts of Lublin. Between October 1941 and July 1944 at least 200,000 people were killed in the camp.
- 2 October — Operation Typhoon begins as Germany launches an all-out offensive against Moscow.
- 8 October — In their invasion of the Soviet Union, Germany reaches the Sea of Azov with the capture of Mariupol.
- 21 October — The Germans rampage in Yugoslavia, killing thousands of civilians.
- 31 October — The destroyer USS Reuben James is torpedoed by a German U-boat near Iceland, killing more than 100 United States Navy sailors.

=== November ===
- 7 November — The Soviet hospital Ship Armenia is sunk by German planes while evacuating refugees, wounded military and the staff of several Crimean hospitals. It is estimated that at least 5,000 died in the sinking.
- 12 November — As Battle of Moscow begins, temperatures around Moscow drop to −12 °C, and the Soviet Union launches ski troops for the first time against the freezing German forces near the city.
- 13 November — The aircraft carrier HMS Ark Royal is hit by German U-boat U-81. the carrier capsized and sunk a day later.
- 18 November — Operation Crusader in North Africa begins
- 19 November — Both commerce raiding hilfskreuzer Kormoran and Australian cruiser HMAS Sydney sink following a battle off the coast of Western Australia. There are no survivors from the 645 Australian sailors aboard Sydney.
- 22 November — HMS Devonshire sinks commerce raiding hilfskreuzer Atlantis, ending the longest warship cruise of the war. (622 days without in-port replenishment or repair)
- 27 November — German troops get as close to Moscow as they ever will; they are subsequently frozen by cold weather and attacks by the Soviets.

=== December ===
- 6 December — Soviet counterattacks begin against German troops encircling Moscow. Wehrmacht is subsequently pushed back over.
- 8 December — The Nazi German extermination camp Chelmno opens in occupied Poland near a small village called Chełmno nad Nerem. Between December 1941-April 1943 and June 1944-January 1945 at least 153,000 people were killed in the camp.
- 11 December — Germany and Italy declare war on the United States.
- 19 December — Hitler becomes Supreme Commander-in-Chief of the German Army.
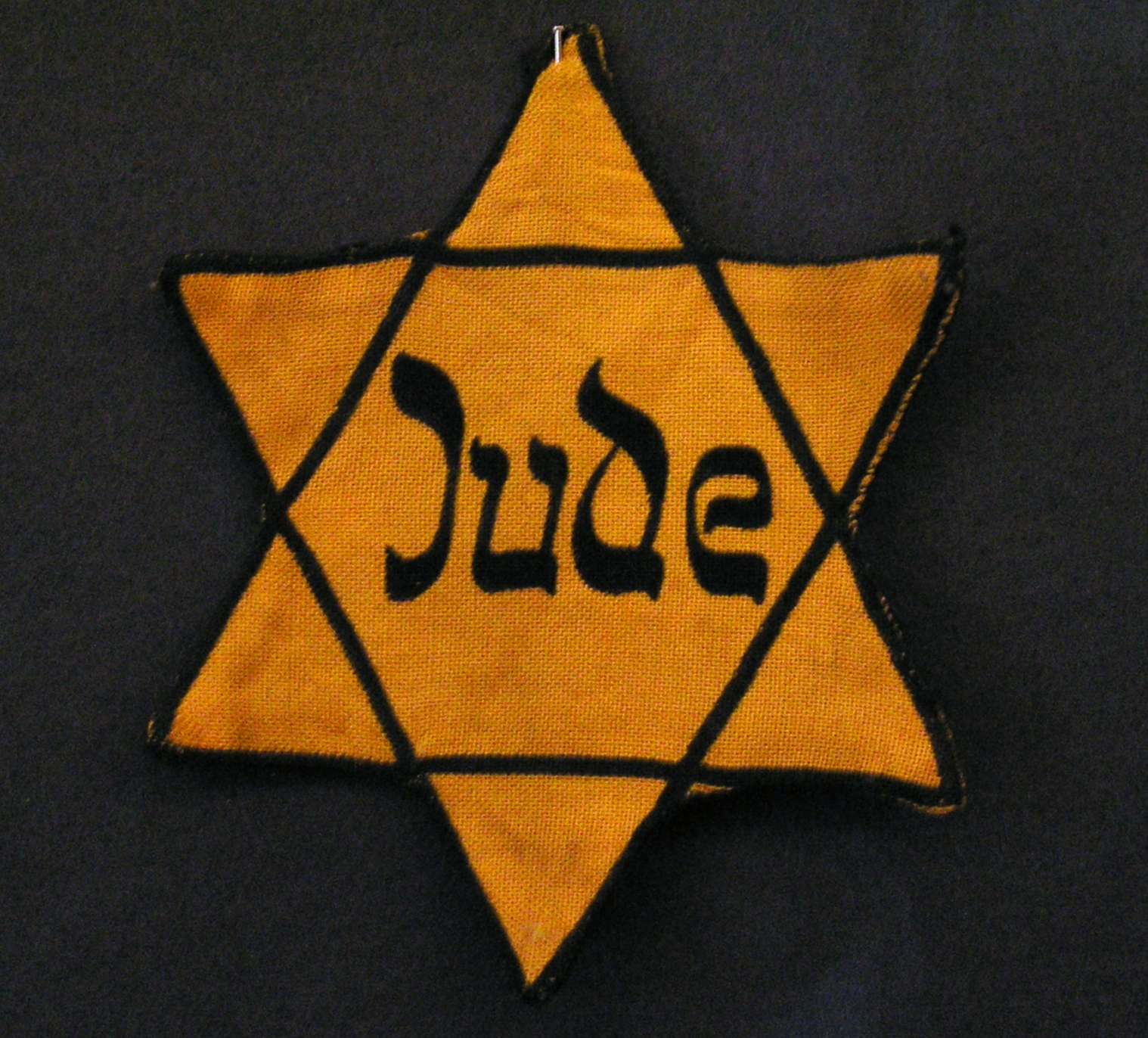
6 September: The requirement to wear the Star of David with the word "Jew" inscribed, is extended to all Jews over the age of 6 in German-occupied areas.

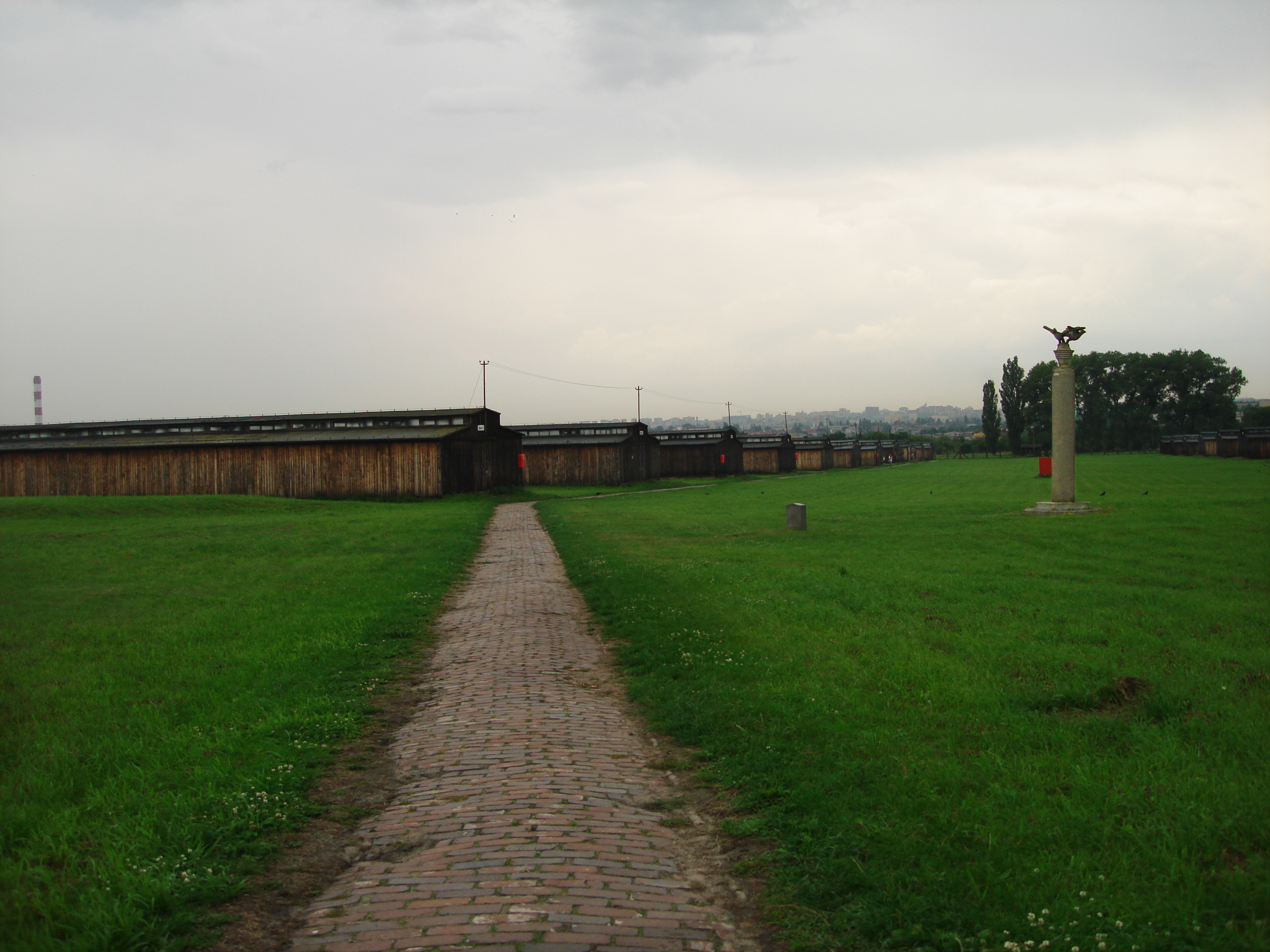
1 October: the Nazi German extermination camp Konzentrationslager Lublin opens in occupied Poland

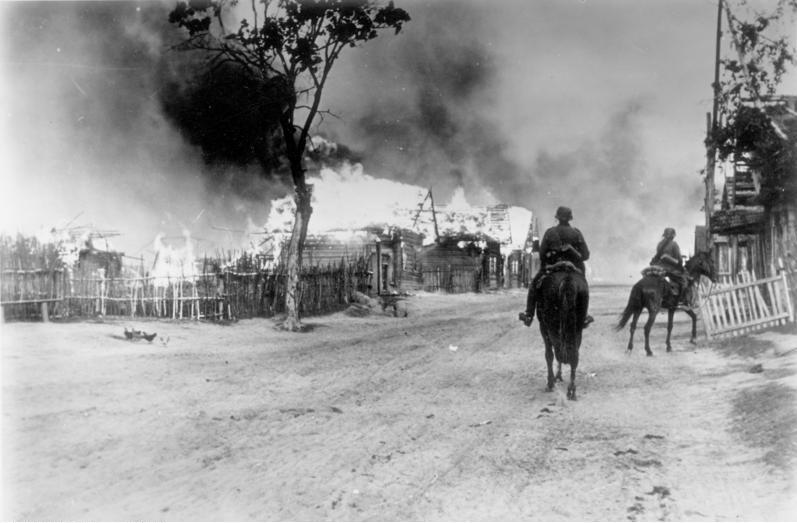
German soldiers beside a Russian village they destroyed during Operation Barbarossa, 16 July 1941

== Births ==
- 17 January — Manfred Schellscheidt, German-born American soccer coach
- 25 January — Theo Berger, German criminal (died 2003)
- 28 January - Jochen Busse, German comedian
- 1 February - Karl Dall, German comedian (died 2020)
- 11 February - Rudolf Brunnenmeier, German football player (died 2003)
- 13 February — Sigmar Polke, German painter (died 2010)
- 3 March — Jutta Hoffmann, German actress
- 6 March — Dieter Rexroth, German musicologist and dramaturge (died 2024)
- 14 March — Wolfgang Petersen, German film director (died 2022)
- 28 March — Rolf Zacher, German actor (died 2018)
- 2 April — Heinz Hermann Thiele, German businessman (died 2021)
- 3 April - Eric Braeden, German actor
- 19 April — Jürgen Kocka, German historian
- 10 May — Winfried Bischoff, German-English banker and businessman
- 25 May — Uta Frith, German-born British psychologist
- 31 May — Hans Neuenfels, German theatre and opera director (died 2022)
- 10 June - Jürgen Prochnow, German actor.
- 20 June
  - Dieter Mann, German actor and director (died 2022)
  - Ulf Merbold, German physicist and astronaut
- 21 June — Liz Mohn, German businesswoman
- 29 June - Margitta Gummel, German shot putter (died 2021).
- 30 June - Otto Sander, German actor (died 2013)
- 3 July — Hertha Haase, German Olympic swimmer
- 5 July — Margot Hellwig, German folk singer
- 17 July - Jürgen Flimm, German theatre and opera director (died 2023)
- 18 July - Frank Farian, German record producer and songwriter
- 19 July – Uta Nickel, German economist and politician
- 20 July - Frank Natterer, German mathematician
- 17 August
  - Maria-Elisabeth Schaeffler, German entrepreneur
  - Fritz Wepper, German actor.
- 24 September - Alexander Lang, German actor and stage director (died 2024)
- 28 September - Edmund Stoiber, German politician
- 29 September - Hans-Jochen Jaschke, German Roman Catholic prelate (died 2023)
- 28 October — Jochen Hasenmayer, German cave diver
- 30 October - Theodor W. Hänsch, German physicist
- 13 November — Eberhard Diepgen, German politician
- 23 November - Lothar Emmerich, German footballplayer (died 2003)
- 24 December - Hans Eichel, German politician

== Deaths ==
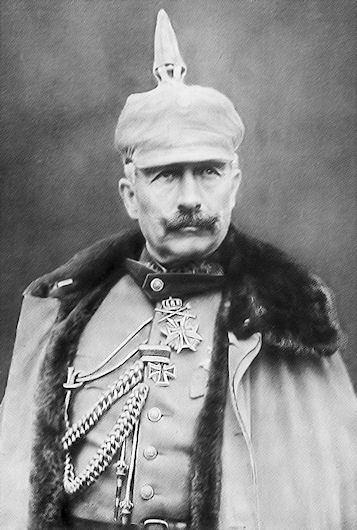
Wilhelm II

- 11 February — Rudolf Hilferding, German economist and Minister of Finance (born 1877)
- 16 February – Frida Felser, opera singer and actress (born 1872).
- 24 February — Lothar von Arnauld de la Perière, German submariner (born 1886)
- 4 March – Ludwig Quidde, German pacifist (born 1858)
- 1 June — Hans Berger, German neurologist (born 1873)
- 4 June — Wilhelm II, last Emperor of Germany (born 1859)
- 26 June — Hans Ludendorff, German astronomer (born 1873)
- 15 July — Walter Ruttmann, German director (born 1887)
- 12 September — Hans Spemann, German embryologist, recipient of the Nobel Prize in Physiology or Medicine (born 1869)
- 8 October — Gus Kahn, German songwriter (born 1886)
- 18 November — Walther Nernst, German chemist, Nobel Prize laureate (born 1864)
- 22 November — Werner Mölders, German fighter pilot (born 1913)
- 30 November – Elfriede Wever, German Olympic runner (born 1900)
