= Carsten Bresch =

German physicist and geneticist (1921–2020)

- Born: 5 September 1921; Berlin, Germany
- Died: 1 March 2020 (aged 98)
- Occupations: Physicist; Geneticist
- Organizations: Max Planck Institute for Physical Chemistry; University of Cologne; Southwest Center for Advanced Studies; University of Freiburg
- Known for: Classical and Molecular Genetics

Carsten Bresch (5 September 1921 – 1 March 2020) was a German geneticist and physicist. He was a professor at the University of Freiburg at the Faculty of Biology. Working in Göttingen, Cologne, Dallas, and Freiburg, he was a pioneer of genetics of bacteriophages, writing the standard Classical and Molecular Genetics.

== Biography ==
Bresch was born on 5 September 1921 in Berlin. He studied physics and in 1947 he was one of the first students of Max Delbrück in postwar Berlin. Since 1949, he worked as an assistant at the reestablished Max Planck Institute for Physical Chemistry (today Max Planck Institute for Biophysical Chemistry) in Göttingen, where he introduced bacteriophages as an object of study in the genetics.

In 1958, Bresch went from Göttingen to the University of Cologne, where he prepared the foundation of a Genetics-Institute by order of Delbrück and the botany professor Joseph Straub. After completion, Bresch, Delbrück, Walther Harm, Peter Starlinger as well as the nucleic acid chemist Ulf Hennig moved into the Institute. In 1965, Bresch left the institute, in order to lead the Biology Division of Southwest Center for Advanced Studies (SCAS) in Dallas, Texas. Since 1968, Bresch held the chair for genetics at the University of Freiburg. At the same time he was the leader of the "Zentrallabor für Mutagenitätsprüfung der Deutschen Forschungsgemeinschaft" (Central Laboratory of Mutagenicity of the German Research Foundation).

His main scientific work area was the genetics of bacteriophages. Bresch is the author of the book Classical and Molecular Genetics, which was considered as the international definitive book of genetics for many years. In addition to his research and teaching activities he got involved with interdisciplinary subjects concerning theology and natural science.

Bresch died on 1 March 2020 at age 98.

== Work ==
Bresch's book Zwischenstufe Leben – Evolution ohne Ziel? (life as an intermediate stage – evolution without intention?) was much discussed and is his ideological main work. In this book he attempts to develop perspectives for the future of mankind based on secured evolutionary knowledge. All natural phenomena derive from the basic principle of increasing integration, which leads to higher integrated and thus more complex forms. Based on Teilhard de Chardin, he distinguishes three stages of evolution: the evolution of matter, life, mind and culture. At this point, he asks the question whether the evolution has come to an end or will go beyond? He is convinced that evolution will outlast mankind and end in a last destination called point omega. "Thus the book is a seminal contribution for a new world view of modern man, who is at a loss with the meaning of life." (From the introduction of "Zwischenstufe Leben", München 1977, Piper Verlag).

Bresch's book Zwischenstufe Leben represents a scientific description of Teilhard de Chardin´s universal and theological evolutionary concept. His latest book Evolution appeared in November 2010.

== Books ==
As author:

- Klassische und molekulare Genetik. Berlin: Springer, 1964 ISBN 3-540-05802-8 (3rd extended edition 1972)
- Zwischenstufe Leben. Evolution ohne Ziel? Munich: Piper, 1977. ISBN 3-492-02270-7
- Des Teufels neue Kleider. Munich: TR-Verlagsunion, 1978 ISBN 3-8058-0903-4
- Evolution – Was bleibt von Gott. Stuttgart: Schattauer, 2010 ISBN 3-7945-2757-7

As editor:

- AGEMUS - Rundbrief: Arbeitsgemeinschaften Evolution, Menschheitszukunft und Sinnfragen. Freiburg 1981 to 1983
- Kann man Gott aus der Natur erkennen? Freiburg im Breisgau: Herder, 1990 ISBN 3-451-02125-0
- Gut und Böse in der Evolution. Naturwissenschaftler, Philosophen und Theologen im Disput. Stuttgart: S. Hirzel, 1995 ISBN 3-8047-1423-4
