= 2020 Rot am See shooting =

Mass shooting in Rot am See, Germany

- Location: Rot am See, Baden-Württemberg, Germany
- Date: 24 January 2020; 12:45 pm (UTC+01:00)
- Attack type: Mass shooting, familicide
- Weapon: 9mm Walther Q5 Match Champion semi-automatic pistol
- Deaths: 6
- Injuries: 2
- Perpetrator: Adrian Schurr
- Motive: Unknown, possibly an inheritance dispute

On 24 January 2020, six people were killed and two others were wounded in a mass shooting in Rot am See, Germany. One suspect, a 26-year-old German citizen, was arrested after reporting himself to the police.

== Shooting ==
The shooting occurred in a restaurant located next to the train station. The motive is suspected to be a family dispute. Three men and three women were killed, aged from 36 to 69. The victims were family members of the shooter, including his parents. The shooting happened around 12:45 local time (11:45 UTC). German authorities on Saturday increased their investigation into the motivation behind the shooting. Criminologist and criminal psychologist Rudolf Egg said that the shooter acted impulsively and explosively, ruling out the possibility that the attack was premeditated. The shooter had no prior criminal record. The shooter accused his mother of trying to "poison him with female hormones" and said that she "destroyed his life". There was no evidence supporting the shooter's claims. The shooter also claimed that his mother verbally abused him as a child and resented him for being born male since she wanted a second daughter instead.

=== Victims ===
Three of the victims killed were men aged 36, 65 and 69, while the three others were women aged 36, 56 and 62. The police confirmed that two of the deceased were the suspect's parents.

Two other victims were alive and being treated in a local hospital, one with life-threatening injuries. Two people were found inside the house, and four people in front of it. The two injured victims were a man and a woman, whom the authorities said were "not locals." Officials were trying to determine what relationship they might have had to the suspect.

On the Saturday night after, citizens of Rot am See placed memorial candles for the victims in the place.

== Aftermath ==
The shooter was sentenced to 15 years in prison and placement in a psychiatric hospital.
