= Soyen =

- Municipality
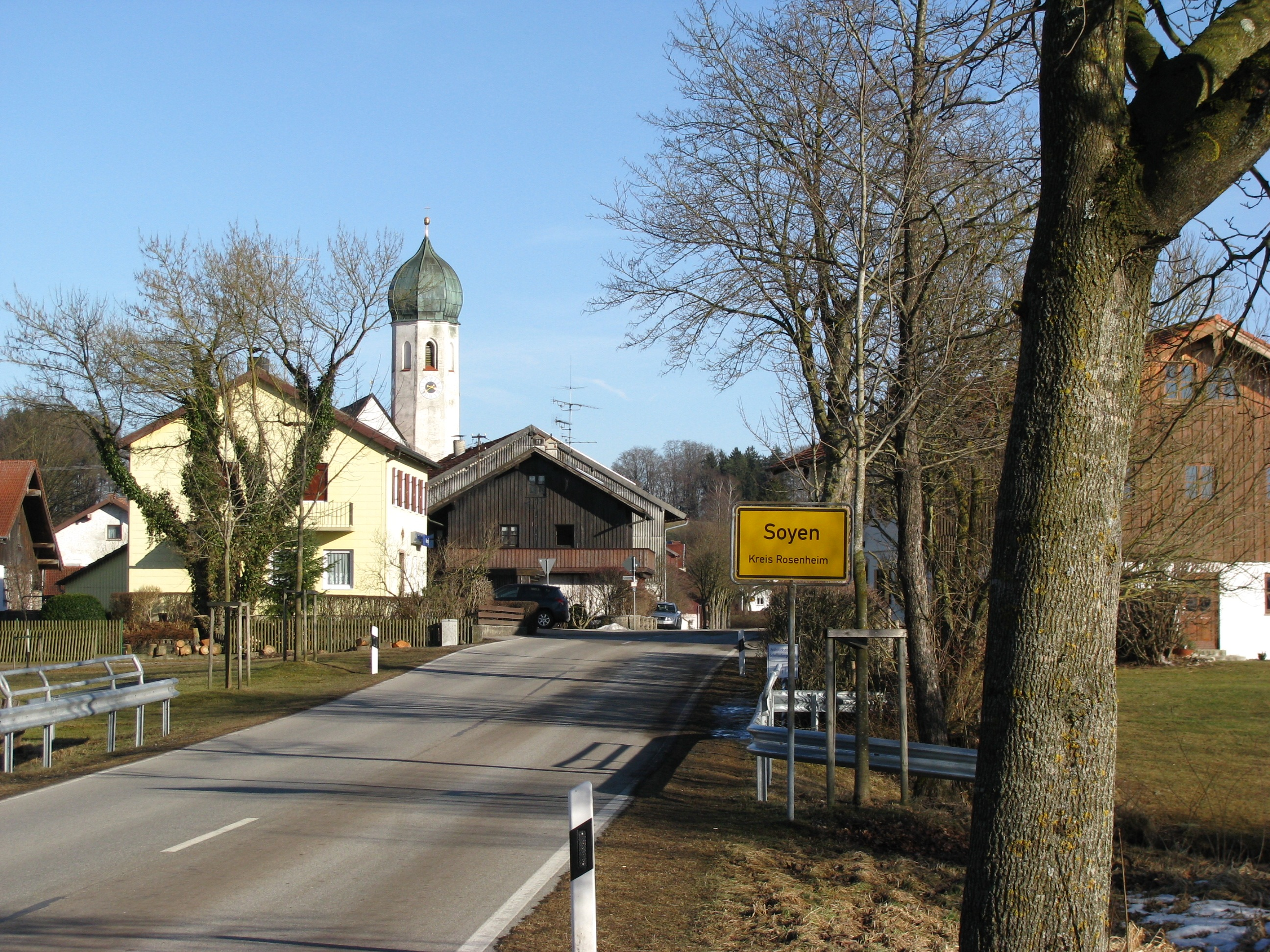
- Entering the village from the west

- Coat of arms

- Location of Soyen within Rosenheim district
- Interactive map of Soyen
- Location within Germany Location within Bavaria
- Coordinates: 48°07′N 12°12′E
- Country: Germany
- State: Bavaria
- Admin. region: Oberbayern
- District: Rosenheim

Government
  - Mayor (2020–26): Thomas Weber

Area
  - Total: 28.94 km^{2} (11.17 sq mi)
- Elevation: 475 m (1,558 ft)

Population (2025-12-31)
  - Total: 2,947
  - Density: 101.8/km^{2} (263.7/sq mi)
- Time zone: UTC+01:00 (CET)
  - Summer (DST): UTC+02:00 (CEST)
- Postal codes: 83564
- Dialling codes: 08071
- Vehicle registration: RO
- Website: www.soyen.de

Soyen is a municipality in the district of Rosenheim in Bavaria in Germany. It lies on the river Inn.
