= Christoph Sydow =

German journalist (1985–2020)

- Born: 11 February 1985; East Berlin, East Germany
- Died: 1 June 2020 (aged 35); Berlin, Germany
- Occupation: Journalist
- Children: 2

Christoph Sydow (February 11, 1985 – 1 June 2020) was a German journalist who worked for Der Spiegel as a foreign correspondent in the Middle East.

== Life ==
Sydow had been interested in political journalism from an early age, often carrying around issues of his later employee's magazine and impressing classmates by acting as a "walking encyclopedia". While working on his degree in Islamic Studies at the Free University of Berlin, he co-founded the Alsharq blog in 2005, a platform for students to publish own articles about the Middle East. In 2013, this blog was nominated for the Grimme Online Award.

In 2009, he began working for zenith, an independent German magazine specialized on events in the Arab world. During the Arab Spring in 2011, Sydow first became known to a wider audience by appearing as an expert on the topic in several forms of media. Sydow joined Der Spiegel in 2012 and soon became their main correspondent in the Middle Eastern region, soon acquiring an internal reputation for his particularly meticulous and precise methods.

Sydow, who was married and had two children, killed himself on 1 June 2020.
