= 2020 Solingen killings =

Child killings in Germany

- Location: Solingen, North Rhine-Westphalia, Germany
- Date: 3 September 2020
- Deaths: 5
- Injuries: 1 (the perpetrator)

The 2020 Solingen killings occurred on 3 September 2020, at 11:45 a.m. local time, when a 27-year-old mother, Christiane K., killed five of her six children in an apartment in the Hasseldelle district of Solingen, a city in North Rhine-Westphalia, Germany. The children, aged one, two, three, six and eight, were sedated with large doses of medications and then either drowned or suffocated. Prior to the killings, the eldest sixth child, an 11-year-old boy, had been sent by the woman to stay with his grandmother, who alerted the authorities.

The motive for the woman's murders was attributed to her discovery of a photograph of her former partner with his new romantic interest. In response to this discovery, the woman wrote to him that he would never see his children again. After the killings, the woman attempted suicide by jumping in front of a train at the Düsseldorf train station, but survived with serious injuries.

In a ruling by an expert appointed by the court, it was determined that the woman did not suffer from a serious mental illness, though she has been diagnosed with narcissistic personality disorder. The Wuppertal court found the mother guilty and sentenced her to life imprisonment, citing the aggravated nature of the crime, which typically precludes the possibility of parole after 15 years, otherwise a common outcome in similar cases in Germany.

== See also ==
- Hanau shootings
