= Uli Stein (artist) =

German cartoonist (1946–2020)

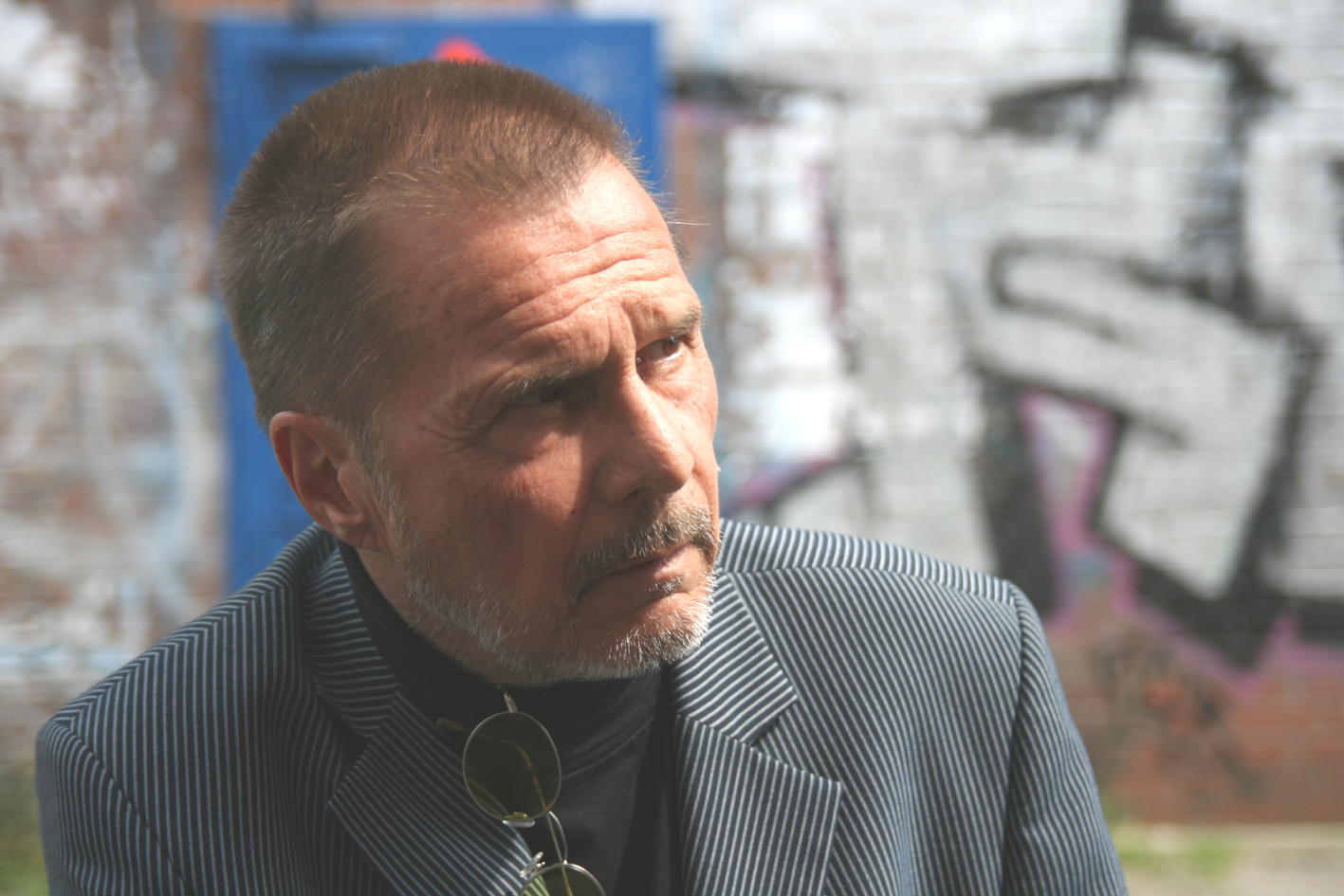
- Uli Stein in 2007
- Born: Ulrich Steinfurth; 26 December 1946; Hanover, Lower Saxony, Allied-occupied Germany
- Died: 28 August 2020 (aged 73); Hanover, Lower Saxony, Germany
- Known for: cartoonist
- Website: www.ulistein.de

Ulrich Steinfurth, better known as Uli Stein, (26 December 1946 – 28 August 2020) was a German cartoonist.

== Personal life ==
Stein was born Ulrich Steinfurth in Hanover as a son of a housewife and a public servant. He graduated the Goetheschule in Hanover. After a two-year conscription in the Bundeswehr, he moved to West Berlin where he studied German, Geography and Biology at the Freie Universität Berlin. Shortly before graduating, he quit his studies to work as a journalist, amongst others six years for the Saarländischer Rundfunk. At the end of the 70s, he focused on cartoons full-time.

Stein died on 28 August 2020 in his hometown of Hanover from Parkinson's disease.

== Cartoons ==
Stein's cartoons mainly focus on day-to-day-situations, often with anthropomorphic mice, cats, dogs, penguins and pigs. He also created cartoons for other events and subjects, such as politics or soccer. Although he mainly sold books and post cards with his cartoons, there is a variety of other products based on them, such as games and articles of daily use.

By 2008, Stein had sold more than 90 million post cards and 9 million books in Germany alone and his works have been translated into a number of languages. From 1998 onward, he drew a weekly cartoon for TV Hören und Sehen, a German TV guide. With the advent of widespread internet usage, Stein began using the web as a medium for his cartoons, but was skeptical towards its use as a medium for books.

== Bibliography ==
- Uli Stein: Mein Tagebuch. Lappan Verlag GmbH, Oldenburg 2006, ISBN 3-8303-3136-3.
