= Ralf Metzenmacher =

German artist (1964–2020)

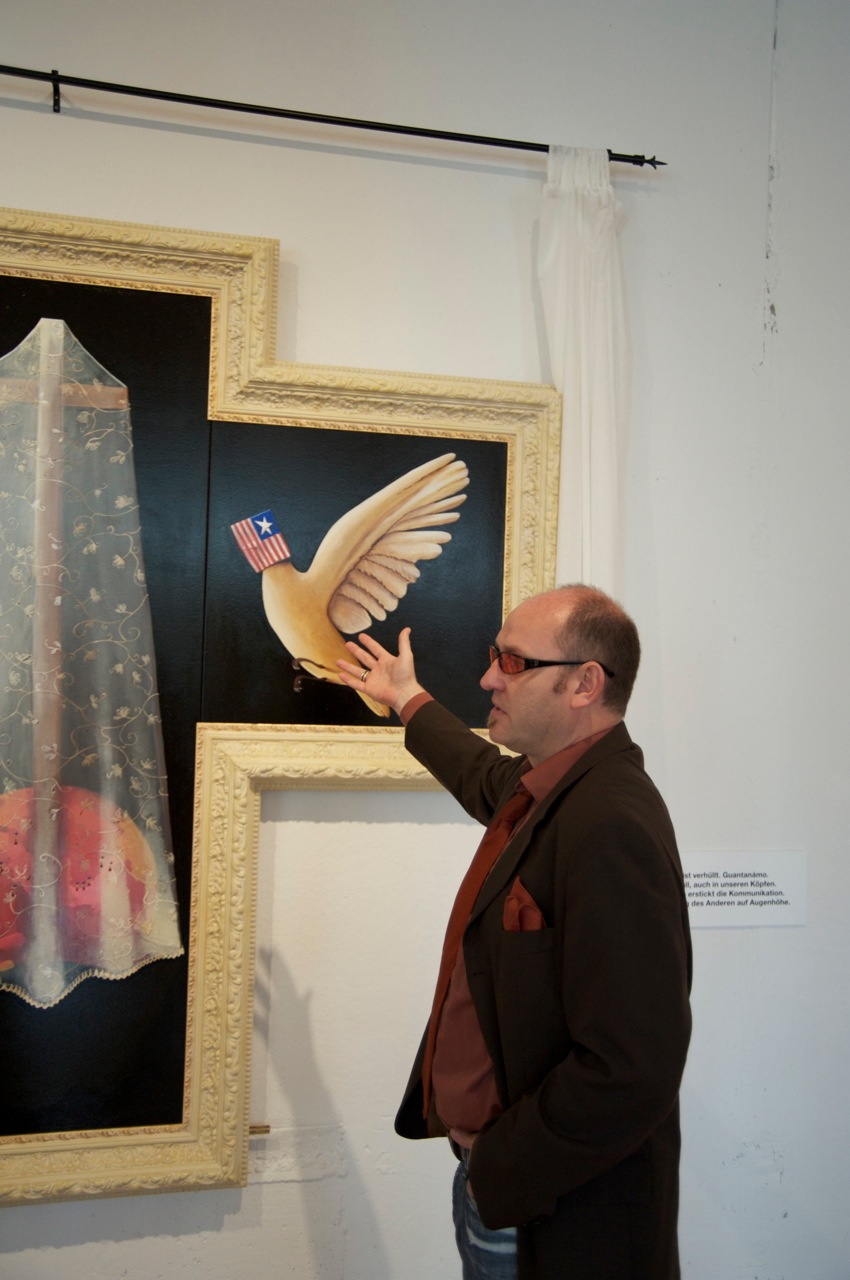
- Metzenmacher in 2009
- Born: 26 July 1964; Aachen, West Germany
- Died: 3 August 2020 (aged 56)
- Education: Aachen University of Applied Sciences (FH Aachen): Product Design
- Known for: Painting, Design
- Movement: Retro-Art, Pop art, Still life

Ralf Metzenmacher (26 July 1964 – 3 August 2020) was a German painter and designer. He was an exponent and pioneer of Retro-Art, a synthesis between art and product design. Metzenmacher saw his Retro-Art technique as a revitalization of 17th century still life painting and as a further development of pop art.

== Biography ==
Metzenmacher was born in Aachen. He attended Aachen University of Applied Sciences (FH Aachen) from 1986 to 1991. There he studied object- and product design under Professors Christiane Maether and Ulf Hegewald, specializing in painting technique and drawing. Between 1991 and 2004 he worked as a designer for Puma. As director, towards the end of his time there he was responsible for the Footwear Europe and Accessories International division. He played a significant role in the process of transforming the sports manufacturers into an international Sports-Lifestyle brand.

From the early 1980s onwards, Metzenmacher spent more and more of his time concentrating on painting technique. He produced a multitude of paintings (genre scenes and still lifes) during his degree and alongside his job as designer. These are all documented in his book “The other world” (self-published). He worked as a freelance artist from 2004 on and lived and worked in Bamberg.

== Retro-Art ==
=== Concepts ===
Metzenmacher used his painting technique to polarize and surprise through the regeneration of numerous concepts. He described himself as a “paintbrush artist” and referred to his exhibition rooms as “schooruum”, an onomatopoeic reference to the English word “showroom”. He propagated the term “Retro-Art” to describe his own painting technique. As self-proclaimed “pioneer” in this area, his aim was to successfully integrate this synthesis of art and design into the Fine art world and to establish its position in the art market.

The term “retro” or “retro-aesthetic” became popular in the mass culture of the nineties, rather than through any art connection. As a movement that has penetrated film, fashion, music and custom design to a similar extent, retro has become a specific expression of a cultural orientation – the spirit of the times in the last decade of the twentieth century.

=== “Further development” of Pop art ===
Retro-art painting technique is reminiscent of Pop art, with intensive strong colours and a reduction and simplification in its presentation. However, whilst Pop art links art with graphics, Retro-Art combines art with product design. “Classic” Pop art generally uses two-dimensional images from comics or advertisements to depict (American) symbols as icons of folk culture. In contrast, Retro-Art uses three-dimensional representations and adopts a critical standpoint on current issues and trends in youth culture and lifestyle.

=== “Revitalisation” of still life painting technique ===
Some of Metzenmacher's pictures (e.g. “The Crown”) feature surreal elements, reminiscent of Salvador Dalí’s work. However, Metzenmacher did not see himself as a surrealist, but rather; more as a modern ambassador for the classical still life painting technique. The works and painting techniques of Spanish artist Francisco Zurbarán had a lasting influence upon him, as did the still life paintings of Italian artist Giorgio Morandi.

Retro-Art painting technique is effectively a “revitalisation” of 17th century still life painting technique. As a result, Metzenmacher predominately painted modern still life paintings. Depending on the particular theme, he selected simple objects in daily use (e.g. cigars, punching bags, cars) and portrayed them in an unusual way. He also used familiar symbols from the history of art (e.g. mussels, snails), often modifying or distorting them.

Individual objects are portrayed with a disciplined graphical precision. They are separated from their usual surroundings either to stand-alone or to be presented in an artistically engineered context surrounded by ethereal space. The luminescent contrasting colours distort the materiality of the objects and confound the viewer. Frames in the style of those from times gone by form an essential part of each picture.

=== Target group and collections ===
His painting technique appeals primarily to a young and young at heart public whose interests lie in fashion, design and lifestyle products. As a result, Metzenmacher with his history in product design added “collections” to go with each original. These collections are printed art pieces which differ in colour, size and fittings (frames). This idea of different collections came from the fashion industry and were transferred to the world of art by Metzenmacher. He called his collections “edition” and “rallipan”.

=== Picture cycles ===
Metzenmacher preferred to paint picture cycles. For example, in the cycle “The Crowning of Creation” he portrayed primary and secondary female characteristics in a thought-provoking manner using snails, mussels and melons. Titles for his work include such idiosyncratic examples as “The Cherry Rose” and “The Melon Princess”. In the cycle “The Lord of the Crown” he employed sports cars and a smoldering cigar with a cock ring as symbols of masculinity.

Picture cycles from Ralf Metzenmacher

- Tales from 1001 Nights (1988–89)
  - Subject matter: Tales from 1001 nights
  - Quantity: 17 paintings, various drawings – sketch book
- Rallipan (1989–2004)
  - Subject matter: Self-portraits
  - Quantity: 9 paintings, several drawings – sketch book
- Objects come into the picture (1991)
  - Subject matter: Does still-life painting still make sense today? A pictorial investigation.
  - Quantity: 43 paintings, 30 drawings
- Beach of my Dreams (2003)
  - Subject matter: Human egoism and improvidence
  - Quantity: 14 paintings, various drawings – sketch book
- The Crowning of Creation (2004–05)
  - Subject matter: Femininity
  - Quantity: 22 paintings, various drawings – sketch book
- The Lord of the Crown (2006, work in progress)
  - Subject matter: Masculinity
  - Quantity: 9 paintings, various drawings – sketch book

=== Painting technique and materials ===
- A glazing technique comprising layer upon layer of translucent and opaque paint, based on 17th-century methods.
- Undercoat of acrylic and emulsion paint, which contrasts the smooth oil surface with the characteristic style of the top coat brush strokes.
- Oils on primed canvas.
- Stretcher frames in sizes appropriate to the theme.

== Exhibitions (selection) ==
=== Solo exhibitions ===
- Kunstmeile Kohlenhof, Bamberg, La Trecera – does still life painting still make sense today?, 23 July – 24 August 2004
- Sparkasse Bamberg, The Crowning of Creation, 6 February – 3 March 2006
- 11th Bamberg Art & Antiquities week 2006, schooruum, Obere Sandstr. 2, 21 July – 21 August 2006
- Kirstin Ellen Vietze Stylist & Beautician GmbH, Friedrichstr. 82, Berlin, 7 September – 10 December 2006

=== Group exhibitions ===
- Humanity and nature in accord – Tales of art, Giechburg, September to October 2005
- CURRICULUM ARTE. Christiane Maether and her students – the Aachen years 1982–2006, Suermondt-Ludwig-Museum, 20 May – 23 July 2006

== See also ==
- Retro
- Kehinde Wiley
- John Currin

== Sources ==
- Wolfgang Pauser: Retro-Ästhetik. In: Hubertus Butin (Ed.): DuMonts Begriffslexikon zur zeitgenössischen Kunst. DuMont Verlag, Köln 2002, S.266–270, ISBN 3-8321-5700-X, text in German
- Adam C. Oellers (Ed.): Christiane Maether und SchülerInnen – Die Aachener Jahre 1982–2006. Suermondt-Ludwig-Museum, Aachen 2006, S. 102, ISBN 3-929203-61-8, text in German
- Elizabeth E. Guffey: Retro: The Culture of Revival. Reaktion, London 2006, ISBN 1-86189-290-X
