= Sabine Deitmer =

German writer (1947–2020)

- Born: 21 October 1947; Jena
- Died: 11 January 2020 (aged 72); Dortmund
- Occupations: writer and educator

Sabine Deitmer (21 October 1947 – 11 January 2020) was a German crime writer known for her character, Beate Stein.

== Life ==
Sabine Deitmer was born in Jena in Germany in 1947 and brought up in Düsseldorf before studying literature and languages in Bonn. By, Bye, Bruno was her first published novel which she wrote after travelling to Brighton, Bristol, Berlin and Lake Constance. She lived in the Ruhr.

== Work ==
- Perfekte Pläne, ISBN 978-3-8105-0414-2
- Scharfe Stiche, 2004, ISBN 3-8105-0415-7
- Die schönsten Männer der Stadt, 1997, ISBN 3-596-13620-2
- NeonNächte, 1995, ISBN 3-596-12761-0
- Dominante Damen (Kriminalroman), 1994, ISBN 3-596-12094-2
- Kalte Küsse (Kriminalroman), 1993, ISBN 3-596-11449-7
- Auch brave Mädchen tun's (Mordgeschichten), 1990, ISBN 3-596-10507-2
- Bye-bye, Bruno. Wie Frauen morden (Kriminalgeschichten), 1988, ISBN 3-596-24714-4
