= Ted Herold =

German singer (1942–2021)

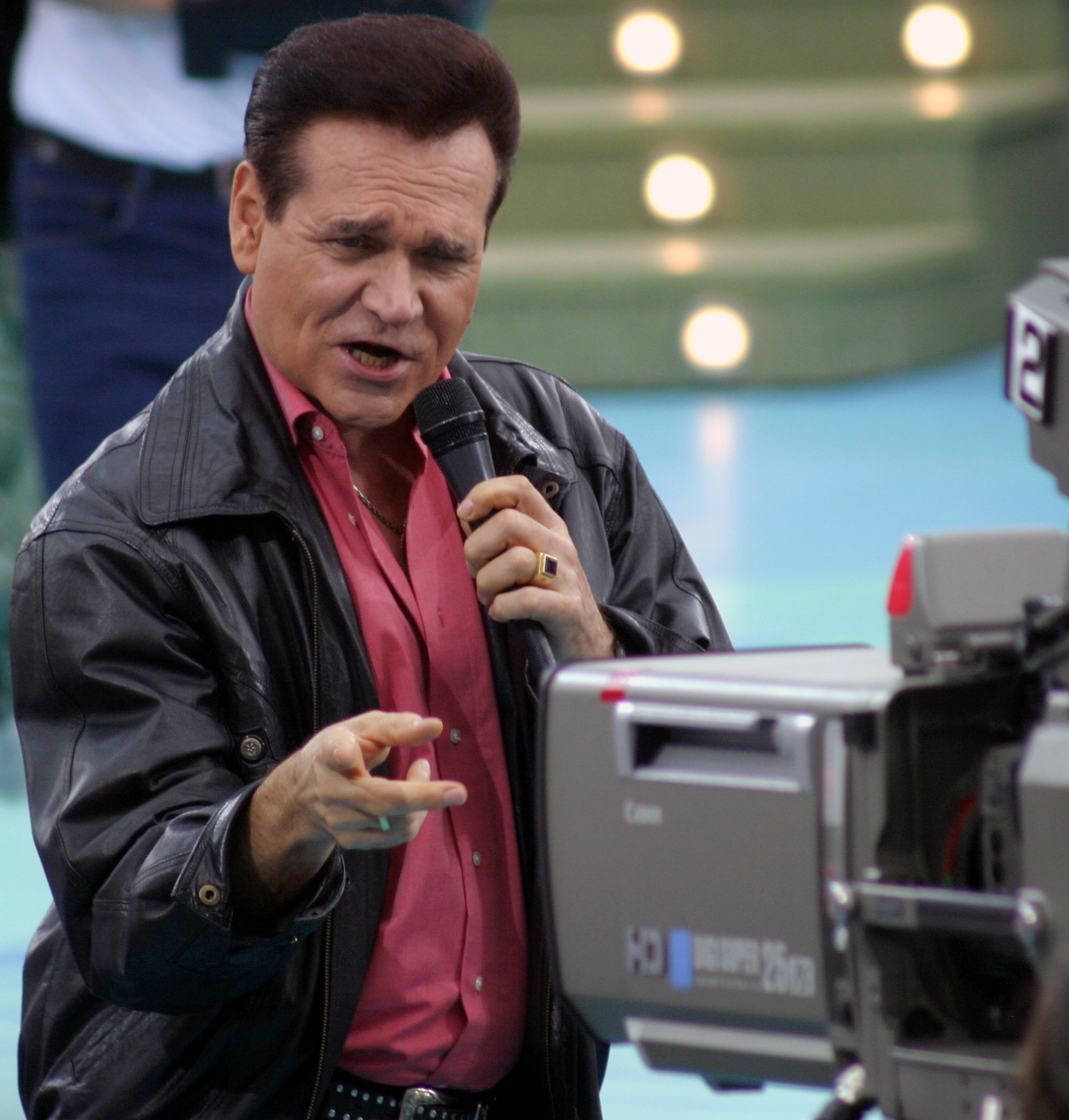
Herold in 2005

Harald Walter Bernhard Schubring (9 September 1942 – 20 November 2021), known professionally as Ted Herold, was a German rock and roll singer.

== Life ==
Harald Walter Bernhard Schubring was born on 9 September 1942, in Berlin-Schöneberg, Prussia, Germany. Besides an extensive discography, Herold also acted in several films in the 1960s.

Herold died on 20 November 2021, along with his wife in a house fire in Dortmund, aged 79.
