= Wolfgang Stahl =

German spectroscopist (1956–2020)

Wolfgang Stahl (1 April 1956 in Kiel – 28 August 2020 in Aachen) was a German spectroscopist. He was a professor at the RWTH Aachen University.

== Life ==
Wolfgang Stahl finished his diploma in chemistry at the University of Kiel in 1983. He received his doctorate in 1987 at the University of Kiel. In 1992, he finished his habilitation in physical chemistry at the University of Kiel. Since 1995, he was professor for molecular spectroscopy at the RWTH Aachen University. For many years he was chairman of the examination board for chemistry and person in charge for the Erasmus Programme in chemistry.

== Research ==
His research focused on following topics in the field of microwave spectroscopy:

- Large amplitude motions in molecules
- Theory of rotational spectra
- Quantum mechanical and group theoretical calculation
- Nuclear quadrupole coupling

== Publications (selection) ==
He published 149 journal articles. A selected number of his articles for different topics:

=== Instrumental work for Fourier transform microwave (FTMW) spectroscopy ===
- Grabow, Jens‐Uwe; Stahl, Wolfgang; Dreizler, Helmut (1996-12-01). "A multioctave coaxially oriented beam‐resonator arrangement Fourier‐transform microwave spectrometer". Review of Scientific Instruments. 67 (12): 4072–4084. Bibcode:1996RScI...67.4072G. doi:10.1063/1.1147553. ISSN 0034-6748.
- Grabow, J.-U.; Stahl, W. (1990-08-01). "Notizen: A Pulsed Molecular Beam Microwave Fourier Transform Spectrometer with Parallel Molecular Beam and Resonator Axes". Zeitschrift für Naturforschung A. 45 (8): 1043–1044. Bibcode:1990ZNatA..45.1043G. doi:10.1515/zna-1990-0817. ISSN 0932-0784. S2CID 95622302.
- Stahl, W.; Fliege, E.; Dreizler, H.; Schwarz, R. (1984-04-01). "A Microwave Fourier Transform Spectrometer for the Lower K-band" (PDF). Zeitschrift für Naturforschung A. 39 (4): 354–356. Bibcode:1984ZNatA..39..354S. doi:10.1515/zna-1984-0406. ISSN 0932-0784. S2CID 93099446.
- Dreizler, H.; Fliege, E.; Mäder, H.; Stahl, W. (1982-11-01). "Microwave Fourier Transform Double Resonance Experiment and Theory" (PDF). Zeitschrift für Naturforschung A. 37 (11): 1266–1271. Bibcode:1982ZNatA..37.1266D. doi:10.1515/zna-1982-1109. ISSN 0932-0784. S2CID 3504895.

=== Naturally occurring substances and fragrances ===
- Van, Vinh; Stahl, Wolfgang; Nguyen, Minh Tuyen; Nguyen, Ha Vinh Lam (2020-06-01). "The smell of coffee: the carbon atom microwave structure of coffee furanone validated by quantum chemistry" (PDF). Canadian Journal of Physics. 98 (6): 538–542. Bibcode:2020CaJPh..98..538V. doi:10.1139/cjp-2019-0475. ISSN 0008-4204. S2CID 209929044.
- Andresen, Maike; Kleiner, Isabelle; Schwell, Martin; Stahl, Wolfgang; Nguyen, Ha Vinh Lam (2020-02-20). "Microwave Spectrum and Internal Rotations of Heptan-2-one: A Pheromone in the Gas Phase" (PDF). The Journal of Physical Chemistry A. 124 (7): 1353–1361. Bibcode:2020JPCA..124.1353A. doi:10.1021/acs.jpca.9b11577. ISSN 1089-5639. PMID 31985229. S2CID 210922430.
- Sutikdja, L. W.; Jelisavac, D.; Stahl, W.; Kleiner, I. (2012-12-01). "Structural studies on banana oil, isoamyl acetate, by means of microwave spectroscopy and quantum chemical calculations". Molecular Physics. 110 (23): 2883–2893. Bibcode:2012MolPh.110.2883S. doi:10.1080/00268976.2012.679630. ISSN 0026-8976. S2CID 95993258.
- Mouhib, Halima; Van, Vinh; Stahl, Wolfgang (2013-08-01). "Sulfur-Containing Flavors: Gas Phase Structures of Dihydro-2-methyl-3-thiophenone". The Journal of Physical Chemistry A. 117 (30): 6652–6656. Bibcode:2013JPCA..117.6652M. doi:10.1021/jp4041748. ISSN 1089-5639. PMID 23815419.

=== Nuclear quadrupole coupling constants ===
- Nguyen, Thuy; Van, Vinh; Gutlé, Claudine; Stahl, Wolfgang; Schwell, Martin; Kleiner, Isabelle; Nguyen, Ha Vinh Lam (2020-04-02). "The microwave spectrum of 2-methylthiazole: 14N nuclear quadrupole coupling and methyl internal rotation" (PDF). The Journal of Chemical Physics. 152 (13): 134306. Bibcode:2020JChPh.152m4306N. doi:10.1063/1.5142857. ISSN 0021-9606. PMID 32268740. S2CID 215599741.
- Nguyen, Ha Vinh Lam; Kannengießer, Raphaela; Stahl, Wolfgang (2012-08-01). "Microwave survey of the conformational landscape exhibited by the propeller molecule triethyl amine" (PDF). Physical Chemistry Chemical Physics. 14 (33): 11753–11758. Bibcode:2012PCCP...1411753N. doi:10.1039/C2CP41385J. ISSN 1463-9084. PMID 22828862. S2CID 29043485.
- Merke, Ilona; Lüchow, Arne; Stahl, Wolfgang (2006-01-03). "Internal rotation, quadrupole coupling and structure of (CH3)3SiI studied by microwave spectroscopy and ab-initio calculations". Journal of Molecular Structure. 780–781: 295–299. Bibcode:2006JMoSt.780..295M. doi:10.1016/j.molstruc.2005.07.011. ISSN 0022-2860.
- Kretschmer, U.; Consalvo, D.; Knaack, A.; Schade, W.; Stahl, W.; Dreizler, H. (1996-04-10). "The 14N quadrupole hyperfine structure in the rotational spectrum of laser vaporized urea observed by molecular beam Fourier transform microwave spectroscopy". Molecular Physics. 87 (5): 1159–1168. Bibcode:1996MolPh..87.1159K. doi:10.1080/00268979600100771. ISSN 0026-8976.
