= Susan Weinert =

German guitarist and songwriter (1965–2020)

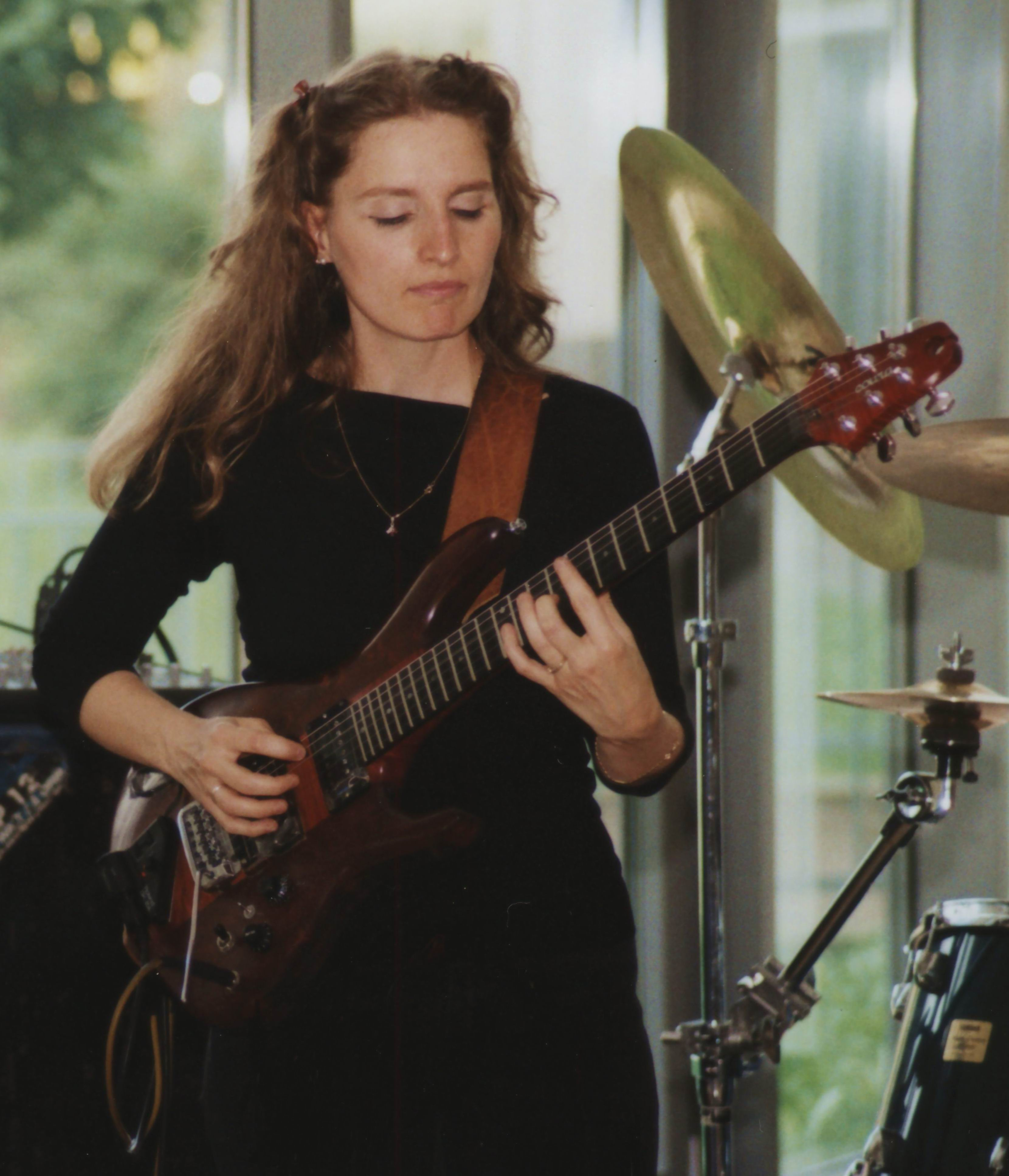
- Susan Weinert in Saarbrücken 2002.

Background information
- Born: 24 June 1965; Neunkirchen, West Germany
- Died: 2 March 2020 (aged 54); Neunkirchen, Saarland, Germany
- Genres: Jazz, jazz fusion
- Instrument: Guitar
- Years active: 1982–2020
- Labels: veraBra, Tough Tone
- Website: Official site

Susan Weinert (24 June 1965 – 2 March 2020) was a German guitarist and songwriter.

== Career ==
Weinert was born in Neunkirchen. Called one of the masters of jazz fusion, she played over 3,000 performances.

On her first album in 1992, WDR radio chose Mysterious Stories as jazz production of the year. In 2004, Weinert with her husband Martin Weinert on bass, singer Francesco Cottone, and Hardy Fischötter on drums recorded Running Out of Time.

Weinert died from cancer at the age 54 on 2 March 2020.

== Discography ==
- Mysterious Stories (veraBra, 1992)
- Crunch Time (veraBra, 1994)
- The Bottom Line (veraBra, 1996)
- Point of View (Intuition, 1999)
- Triple Talk Live (Skip, 2002)
- Synergy with Martin Weinert (Skip, 2002)
- Running Out of Time (Tough Tone, 2004)
- Dancing On the Water (Tough Tone, 2006)
- Tomorrow's Dream (Tough Tone, 2007)
- Thoughts & Memories (Tough Tone, 2010)
- Fjord with Martin Weinert (Tough Tone, 2015)
- Beyond the Rainbow (Tough Tone, 2018)
