= Aufbau Ost (1940) =

Nazi German mobilization to invade the Soviet Union

Aufbau Ost (lit. 'Buildup in the East') was the German operational code name for the mobilisation of forces before the start of Operation Barbarossa and the subsequent invasion of the Soviet Union.

On 7 August 1940, Adolf Hitler ordered Walter Warlimont, deputy to Alfred Jodl, Chief of Staff of the Wehrmacht, to determine the positions of Soviet troops in the east. The appropriate directive was signed the next day by Wilhelm Keitel. It stated that due to the threat of British air attack on Western Germany it was necessary to use the eastern territories for drawing and preparing the new units. In compliance with the directive, the building organization of Fritz Todt started equipping the battleground while the rear organs managed the logistical support in the East. Meanwhile, preparations for adjusting the Soviet rail gauge to match the Western European were taking place. On 5 August 1940, the order was given to start equipment production for the Ostheer (German "East Army"), but the actual production wasn't started till November 1940 because of Economic reasons. The production was led by Hermann Göring's 4 year plan bureau.
