= 1926 in Germany =

- Decades: 1900s; 1910s; 1920s; 1930s; 1940s
- See also: Other events of 1926; History of Germany • Timeline • Years

Events in the year 1926 in Germany.

== Incumbents ==
=== National level ===
- President - Paul von Hindenburg (Non-partisan)
- Chancellor - Hans Luther (German People's Party) (to 12 May), Wilhelm Marx (Centre) (from 17 May)

== Events ==
- 1 January – the city of Cologne is badly hit by flooding in the river Rhine.
- 6 January – Deutsche Luft Hansa is formed by the merger of Deutsche Aero Lloyd and Junkers Luftverkehr
- 7 January – Deutschlandsender, a radio transmitter, is opened for the first time.
- 20 January – Chancellor Hans Luther is forced to reconstitute his cabinet as a minority government, having lost the support of some of his partners the previous December.
- 8 February – The Reich government under Chancellor Hans Luther unanimously decides to formally apply for Germany’s admission to the League of Nations.
- 14 February – The Nazi Party holds the Bamberg Conference in an attempt to strengthen Adolf Hitler's control over the party.
- 21 February – A major rally of the republican organization Black, Red, Gold Banner of the Reich takes place in Hamburg, with speeches by Prussian Minister-President Otto Braun and Reichstag President Paul Löbe.
- 19 March – Max Wolf of the University of Heidelberg discovers the asteroid 2732 Witt.
- 11 April – Hermannplatz railway station opens in Berlin.
- 24 April – Treaty of Berlin (1926) is signed with the Soviet Union promising a five-year period of non-involvement if either state is attacked by a third party.
- 12 May – The Luther government falls as a result of its support for a modified imperial flag for use at the Republic's foreign missions.
- 16 May – Wilhelm Marx succeeds Luther as Chancellor although otherwise the make-up of the Cabinet is not altered.
- 20 June – A referendum on expropriating former royal properties without compensation fails due to a low voter turnout.
- 24 June – the liner Padua is launched. Other ships launched this year (all with date of launch unknown) include SS Amrum, SS Ilse L M Russ and SS Siegmund.
- 28 June – German company Daimler-Benz was founded.
- 3 July – The second NSDAP Party Congress is held in Weimar, featuring elaborate staging to promote Adolf Hitler.
- 4 July –
  - The architectural collective Der Ring is founded in Berlin, with prominent members including Walter Gropius and Ludwig Mies van der Rohe.
  - At the Nazi Party Day held in Weimar, Adolf Hitler proclaims the SS (Schutzstaffel) as his elite organization and entrusts them with the "Blood Flag".
- 3 September – Funkturm Berlin radio tower is opened to the public.
- 10 September – Germany officially joins the League of Nations.
- 17 September – French Foreign Minister Aristide Briand and German Foreign Minister Gustav Stresemann reach a mutual agreement on major foreign policy goals, including early return of the Saar Basin and Rhineland evacuation.
- 6 October – Hans von Seeckt resigns as Head of the Heeresleitung after a dispute over an unauthorized Reichswehr maneuver and tensions with Defence Minister Geßler and President Hindenburg.
- 1 November –
  - Joseph Goebbels is appointed Nazi Gauleiter of Berlin.
  - Franz Pfeffer von Salomon is appointed commander of the SA (Sturmabteilung) across Germany.
- 4 December – The Bauhaus is re-established in Dessau and gains state recognition as a Hochschule für Gestaltung.
- 10 December – Foreign Minister Gustav Stresemann and his French counterpart Aristide Briand receive the Nobel Peace Prize for their work on the Locarno Treaties.
- 16 December – Philipp Scheidemann of the Social Democratic Party reveals that the Reichswehr is secretly working with the Soviet Red Army and anti-republican groups in Germany.
- 17 December – The Marx administration loses a vote of confidence and, although Marx continues as Chancellor, he does so without the involvement of previous coalition partners the German Democratic Party.

=== Date unknown ===
- The National Socialist German Students' League is established.
- The Old Social Democratic Party of Germany and the Reich Party for Civil Rights and Deflation are both established.
- Gustav Stresemann is awarded the Nobel Peace Prize along with fellow architect of the Locarno Treaties Aristide Briand.
- German company Südzucker was founded.

== Popular culture ==
=== Arts ===
- 27 March – Der Protagonist, an opera by Kurt Weill, is performed for the first time at Semperoper in Dresden.
- 6 October – Friedrich Wilhelm Murnau’s film Faust premieres at the Ufa-Palast in Berlin.
- 22 October – Frank Wedekind’s play Lulu premieres at the Schauspielhaus in Berlin.
- 9 November – Paul Hindemith's opera Cardillac is premiered at the Staatsoper, Dresden.
- 14 November – Der Golem, an opera by Eugen d'Albert receives its premiere at the Alte Oper in Frankfurt.
- 27 November – Ernst Krenek's opera Orpheus und Eurydike premieres at the Staatstheater in Kassel.
- The Adventures of Prince Achmed by Lotte Reiniger is released. It is the oldest surviving animated feature film.

=== Sport ===
- 11 July – The German Grand Prix makes its first appearance on the sporting calendar. The event is won by Rudolf Caracciola.
- 1. FC Nürnberg are crowned German football champions.
- SV Wehen Wiesbaden and FSV 1926 Fernwald are amongst the new association football clubs set up.
- Berliner RC, a Rugby Union club, are established.

== Births ==
- 2 January – Valéry Giscard d'Estaing, President of France (died 2020 in France)
- 3 January – W. Michael Blumenthal, German-American economist and politician
- 5 January – Walther Leisler Kiep, German politician (died 2016)
- 6 January – Walter Sedlmayr, actor (died 1990)
- 24 January – Hans-Jürgen Borchers, mathematical physicist (died 2011)
- 26 January – Kurt-Heinz Stolze, pianist (died 1970)
- 28 January – Meier Schwarz, Israeli plant physiologist (died 2022 in Israel)
- 29 January – Ernst Träger, judge (died 2015)
- 31 January:
  - Johannes Joachim Degenhardt, Archbishop of Paderborn (died 2002)
  - Horst Giese, actor (died 2008)
  - Rudi Kopp, cross country skier (died 2022)
  - Maria Emanuel, Margrave of Meissen, nobleman (died 2012)
- 2 February – Fritz Stern, German-American historian (died 2016)
- 3 February:
  - Franz Islacker, footballer (died 1970)
  - Hans-Jochen Vogel, politician (died 2020)
- 6 February – Elisabeth Guttenberger, Holocaust survivor and human rights activist (died 2024)
- 8 February – Sonja Ziemann, actress (died 2020)
- 11 February – Ursula Buckel, opera singer (died 2005)
- 16 February – Margot Frank, sister of Anne Frank (died 1945)
- 20 February – Adolf Bechtold, footballer (died 2012)
- 23 February – Christian Habicht, historian (died 2018)
- 11 March:
  - Albrecht Dietz, German entrepreneur and scientist (died 2012)
  - Heinz Kiessling, musician (died 2003)
  - Peer Schmidt, actor (died 2010)
- 17 March – Siegfried Lenz, writer of novels, short stories and essays (died 2014)
- 25 March – Georg Schäfer (artist), painter and writer (died 1991)
- 26 March – Heinz Staab, German chemist (died 2012)
- 8 April:
  - Jürgen Moltmann, German theologian (died 2024)
  - Elisabeth Wiedemann, German actress (died 2015)
- 18 April:
  - Horst Käsler, handball player (died 1987)
  - Günter Meisner, actor (died 1994)
- 22 April – Harald Leipnitz, actor (died 2000)
- 26 April – Michael Mathias Prechtl, artist (died 2003)
- 8 May – David Hurst, actor (died 2019)
- 17 May – Franz Sondheimer, German-born Israeli-British chemist (died 1981)
- 19 May – Peter Zadek, film director (died 2009)
- 24 May – Rudolf Kippenhahn, astrophysicist (died 2020)
- 28 May – Gerhard Beil, politician (died 2010)
- 5 June – Johannes, 11th Prince of Thurn and Taxis, businessman (died 1990)
- 6 June – Klaus Tennstedt, conductor (died 1998)
- 14 June – Hermann Kant, writer (died 2016)
- 20 June – Hans-Dieter Lange, journalist and television presenter (died 2012)
- 21 June – Johanna Quandt, business woman (died 2015)
- 24 June – Walter Hirrlinger, German politician (died 2018)
- 22 June – Elyakim Haetzni, Israeli lawyer and politician (died 2022)
- 1 July:
  - Carl Hahn, businessman (died 2023)
  - Hans Werner Henze, composer (died 2012)
- 2 July – Berthold Wulf, priest (died 2012)
- 4 July – Wolfgang Seidel, racing driver (died 1987)
- 12 July – Oswald Mathias Ungers, architect (died 2007)
- 15 July – Hans Frankenthal, writer and Holocaust survivor (died 1999)
- 16 July – Stef Wertheimer, German-born Israeli entrepreneur and industrialist (died 2025)
- 24 July – Hans Günter Winkler, showjumper (died 2018)
- 25 July – August Lütke-Westhüs, equestrian (died 2000)
- 1 August – Theo Adam, opera singer (died 2019)
- 6 August – Moritz, Landgrave of Hesse (died 2013)
- 9 August – Gustav Schmidt, sprint canoer (died 2016)
- 21 August – Ben-Zion Orgad, (German-born) Israeli composer (died 2006)
- 27 August – Karl-Heinz Heddergott, football manager (died 2021)
- 30 August – Rudi Gutendorf, footballer and manager (died 2019)
- 3 September:
  - Rudi Arnstadt, East German border guard (died 1962)
  - Jochen Bleicken, professor of ancient history (died 2005)
- 4 September – Helmut Ringelmann, film producer (died 2011)
- 6 September – Prince Claus of the Netherlands (died 2002)
- 10 September – Gerda Munsinger, prostitute and alleged spy (died 1998)
- 17 September:
  - Hermann Bausinger, cultural scientist (died 2021)
  - Klaus Schütz, politician (died 2012)
- 1 October:
  - Manfred Messerschmidt, historian (died 2022)
  - Gerhard Stolze, opera singer (died 1979)
- 4 October – Klaus Koch, theologian (died 2019)
- 5 October – Gottfried Michael Koenig, composer (died 2021)
- 8 October – Günter Mittag, politician (died 1994)
- 14 October – Günther Schwarberg, journalist (died 2008)
- 15 October – Karl Richter, conductor (died 1981)
- 18 October – Klaus Kinski, actor (died 1991)
- 19 October – Udo Schaefer, Baháʼí author (died 2019)
- 20 October – Ursula Happe, swimmer (died 2021)
- 21 October – Leo Kirch, media entrepreneur (died 2011)
- 26 October – Bernhard Klodt, footballer (died 1996)
- 30 October – Dieter Zechlin, pianist (died 2012)
- 1 November – Günter de Bruyn, writer (died 2020)
- 11 November – Werner Schmieder, politician
- 15 November:
  - Alfred Biehle, politician (died 2014)
  - Manfred Müller, German bishop or Roman Catholic Church (died 2015)
  - Helmut Fischer, actor (died 1997)
- 26 November:
  - Peter van Pels, German-Dutch boyfriend of Anne Frank (died 1945)
  - Ralf Wolter, actor (died 2022)
- 28 November – Eberhard von Brauchitsch, industrialist (died 2010)
- 9 December – Erhard Eppler, politician and businessman (died 2019)
- 10 December – Jacob Birnbaum, Jewish activist (died 2014)
- 16 December – Alfred Koerppen, musician (died 2022)
- 19 December – Hans Henn, bobsledder (died 1993)
- 20 December – Otto Graf Lambsdorff, politician (died 2019)
- 21 December – Herbert Ehrenberg, politician (died 2018)
- 23 December – Heinz Graffunder, architect (died 1994)

== Deaths ==
- 2 February – Karl von Weizsäcker, politician (born 1853)
- 4 January – Franz Stockhausen, conductor (born 1839)
- 7 January – Paul Cassirer, art dealer (born 1871)
- 29 January – Wilhelm Heitmüller, theologian (born 1869)
- 5 February – Gustav Eberlein, sculptor and painter (born 1847)
- 6 February – Wolf Wilhelm Friedrich von Baudissin, theologian (born 1847)
- 11 February – Friedrich Wilhelm Kuhnert, painter (born 1865)
- 13 February – Friedrich Krafft Graf von Crailsheim, German politician (born 1841)
- 20 February – Georg Friedrich Knapp, economist (born 1842)
- 28 February – Gustav Otto, aircraft engineer (born 1883)
- 7 March – Paul Matschie, zoologist (born 1861)
- 24 March – Sizzo, Prince of Schwarzburg, nobleman (born 1860)
- 26 March – Constantin Fehrenbach, politician (born 1852)
- 4 April – August Thyssen, industrialist (born 1842)
- 21 May – Friedrich Kluge, lexicographer (born 1856)
- 23 May – Hans von Koessler, composer (born 1853)
- 3 June – Rudolf Oeser, politician (born 1858)
- 5 June – Richard Wolffenstein, chemist (born 1864)
- 22 July – Otto Wilhelm Madelung, surgeon (born 1846)
- 23 July – Kurt Wüsthoff, fighter pilot (born 1897)
- 5 September – Karl Harrer, journalist and politician (born 1890)
- 15 September – Rudolf Christoph Eucken, philosopher (born 1846)
- 7 October – Emil Kraepelin, psychiatrist (born 1856)
- 9 October – Josias von Heeringen, Army general (born 1850)
- 15 October – Mathilde Bauermeister, opera singer (born 1849)
- 17 October – Otto Heubner, internist and pediatrician (born 1843)
- 26 November – Fritz Cassirer, conductor (born 1871)
- 2 December – Karl Joseph Eberth, pathologist (born 1835)
- 11 December – Carl Magnus von Hell, chemist (born 1849)
