= List of ship launches in 1926 =

The list of ship launches in 1926 includes a chronological list of ships launched in 1926.

	Ship	Class	Builder	Location	Country	Notes
14 January	Stentor	Cargo ship	Caledon Shipbuilding & Engineering Company	Dundee	United Kingdom	For China Mutual Steam Navigation Company
14 January	Carnarvon Castle	Ocean liner	Harland & Wolff	Belfast	United Kingdom	For Union-Castle Line
14 January	Tetela	Reefer ship	Cammell Laird	Birkenhead	United Kingdom	For Fyffes Line
15 January	Ambuscade	Destroyer	Yarrow Shipbuilders	Glasgow	United Kingdom	For Royal Navy
18 January	Oakbank	Cargo ship	Harland & Wolff	Belfast	United Kingdom	For Bank Line.
27 January	Amazon	Destroyer	John I Thornycroft & Company	Woolston	United Kingdom	For Royal Navy
28 January	Caldergate	Tanker	Amble Shipbuilding Co. Ltd.	Amble	United Kingdom	For Anglo-American Oil Co. Ltd.
29 January	Nova Scotia	Ocean liner	Vickers	Barrow-in-Furness	United Kingdom	For Warren Line (Liverpool)
12 February	Director	Cargo ship	Harland & Wolff	Belfast	United Kingdom	For T. & J. Harrison.
14 February	Monte Piana	Cargo ship	Cantiere Navale Triestino	Monfalcone	Italy	For Navigazione Generale Gerolimich & Compagnia Società in Anzioni
16 February	Suffolk	County-class cruiser	Portsmouth Dockyard	Portsmouth	United Kingdom	For Royal Navy
25 February	Speybank	Cargo ship	Harland & Wolff	Govan	United Kingdom	For Bank Line.
26 February	Roma	Cruise liner	Ansaldo Shipyards	Genoa	Italy	For Navigazione Generale Italiana.
11 March	Cornwall	County-class cruiser	Devonport Dockyard	Plymouth	United Kingdom	For Royal Navy
14 March	Île de France	Ocean liner	Chantiers et Ateliers de Saint‑Nazaire–Penhoët	Saint Nazaire	France	For Compagnie Générale Transatlantique
15 March	I-54 (I-154)	Kaidai III-type submarine	Sasebo Naval Arsenal	Sasebo	Japan	For Imperial Japanese Navy
15 March	Stuartstar	Reefer ship	Palmers Shipbuilding & Iron Company	Hebburn	United Kingdom	For Blue Star Line
16 March	Cumberland	County-class cruiser	Vickers-Armstrongs	Barrow-in-Furness	United Kingdom	For Royal Navy
16 March	Kent	County-class cruiser	Chatham Dockyard	Chatham, Kent	United Kingdom	For Royal Navy
16 March	Maidstone	Ferry	Harland & Wolff	Belfast	United Kingdom	For Southern Railway.
18 March	Accra	Passenger ship	Harland & Wolff	Belfast	United Kingdom	For Elder Dempster.
18 March	Ro-67	Type L4 submarine	Mitsubishi	Kobe	Japan	For Imperial Japanese Navy
20 March	Katsonis	Katsonis-class submarine	Forges et Chantiers de la Gironde	Lormont	France	For Hellenic Navy
30 March	City of Bath	Cargo Ship	William Gray & Company	West Hartlepool	United Kingdom	For Ellerman Lines
31 March	Nerissa	Cargo liner	William Hamilton & Company	Glasgow	United Kingdom	For Bowring Brothers
2 April	British Diplomat	Tanker	John Brown & Company	Clydebank	United Kingdom	For British Tanker Company
3 April	Arcadia	Motor yacht	Newport News Shipbuilding	Newport News, Virginia	United States	
12 April	Holland	Submarine tender	Puget Sound Naval Shipyard	Bremerton, Washington	United States	For United States Navy
13 April	Ringwood	Ferry	Harland & Wolff	Belfast	United Kingdom	For Southern Railway.
13 April	Springbank	Cargo ship	Harland & Wolff	Glasgow	United Kingdom	For Bank Line.
15 April	Begonia	Oil barge	Harland & Wolff	Belfast	United Kingdom	For Aregentine Navigation Co.
15 April	San Nicolas	Tanker	Harland & Wolff	Belfast	United Kingdom	For Lago Shipping Co.
23 April	Pol III	Whaler	Akers Mekaniske Verksted	Oslo	Norway	
28 April	Boltonia	Oil barge	Harland & Wolff	Belfast	United Kingdom	For Argentine Navigation Co.
11 May	Africstar	Reefer ship	Palmers Shipbuilding & Iron Company	Hebburn	United Kingdom	For Blue Star Line
15 May	Kikuzuki	Mutsuki-class destroyer	Maizuru Naval Arsenal	Maizuru	Japan	For Imperial Japanese Navy
20 May	George Livesey	Tug	Harland & Wolff	Belfast	United Kingdom	For Southern Gas Co.
20 May	Papudo	Tug	Harland & Wolff	Belfast	United Kingdom	For Pacific Steam Navigation Company.
25 May	Minazuki	Mutsuki-class destroyer	Uraga Dock Company	Uraga	Japan	For Imperial Japanese Navy
29 May	Robador	Motor yacht	Newport News Shipbuilding	Newport News, Virginia	United States	
3 June	Ambrosio	Tanker	Harland & Wolff	Belfast	United Kingdom	For Lago shipping Co.
24 June	Giovanni Nicotera	Destroyer	Pattison	Naples	Italy	For Regia Marina.
24 June	Padua	Flying P-Liner (Barque)	Joh. C. Tecklenborg	Geestemunde	Germany	For F. Laeisz, Hamburg.
26 June	Malolo	Ocean Liner	William Cramp & Sons	Philadelphia	United States	
29 June	Almeda	Reefer ship	Cammell Laird	Birkenhead	United Kingdom	For Blue Star Line
30 June	Oxley	Odin-class submarine	Vickers-Armstrongs	Barrow in Furness	United Kingdom	For Royal Navy
12 July	Mikazuki	Mutsuki-class destroyer	Sasebo Naval Arsenal	Sasebo	Japan	For Imperial Japanese Navy
24 July	Sánchez Barcáiztegui	Churruca-class destroyer	Sociedad Española de Construcción Naval	Cartagena	Spain	For Armada Española
5 August	Sirius	Fishing trawler	J. C. Tecklenborg	Geestemünde	Germany	For Sirius Handels GmbH
10 August	Dolores de Urquiza	Train ferry	Harland & Wolff	Belfast	United Kingdom	For Entre Ríos Railway Co.
24 August	Banda	Steam lighter	Harland & Wolff	Belfast	United Kingdom	For Elder Dempster.
24 August	Berma	Steam barge	Harland & Wolff	Belfast	United Kingdom	For New York & West Africa Steam Navigatio Co.
24 August	Rohna	Cargo liner	Hawthorn Leslie	Hebburn-on-Tyne	United Kingdom	For British India Steam Navigation Company
24 August	Tourville	Duquesne-class cruiser	Lorient Navy Yard		France	For Marine Nationale
26 August	Apapa	Ocean liner	Harland & Wolff	Belfast	United Kingdom	For Elder Dempster Lines.
26 August	Koolinda	Cargo liner	Harland & Wolff	Glasgow	United Kingdom	For Stateships
7 September	Otway	Odin-class submarine	Vickers-Armstrongs	Barrow-in-Furness	United Kingdom	For Royal Australian Navy
9 September	Algonquin	Ocean liner	Newport News Shipbuilding	Newport News, Virginia	United States	For Clyde-Mallory Line
9 September	London Mammoth	Crane pontoon	Harland & Wolff	Belfast	United Kingdom	For Port of London Authority.
15 September	Berwick	County-class cruiser	Fairfield Shipbuilding & Engineering Company	Govan	United Kingdom	For Royal Navy
16 September	Adventure	Schooner	John F James & Son	Essex, Massachusetts	United States	
22 September	Rajula	Cargo liner	Barclay Curle	Glasgow	United Kingdom	For British India Steam Navigation Company
23 September	Alcantara	Passenger ship	Harland & Wolff	Belfast	United Kingdom	For Royal Mail Line.
26 September	Rhenania		Götaverken	Gothenburg	Sweden	For Marinen
6 October	Nagatsuki	Mutsuki-class destroyer	Ishikawajima Shipyards	Tokyo	Japan	For Imperial Japanese Navy
13 October	De Ruyter	Admiralen-class destroyer			Netherlands	For Royal Netherlands Navy
24 October	Kinugasa	Aoba-class cruiser	Kawasaki Heavy Industries	Kobe	Japan	For Imperial Japanese Navy
25 October	Ro-66	Type L4 submarine	Mitsubishi	Kobe	Japan	For Imperial Japanese Navy
18 November	Claus Bolten	Fishing trawler	Schiffsbau Unterweser mbH	Wesermünde	Germany	For Cuxhavener Hochseefischerei
13 December	Augustus	Cruise liner	Ansaldo Shipyards	Genoa	Italy	For Navigazione Generale Italiana.
18 December	Vulcania	Ocean liner	Cantiere Navale Triestino	Monfalcone	Italy	For Cosulich Line
Unknown date	Alabamian	Schooner	Thomas F McMannus	Pensacola, Florida	United States	For Bar Pilots Association
Unknown date	Amrum	Coaster	Nordseewerke	Emden	Germany	For Schröder, Hölken & Fischer
Unknown date	Bembridge	Pilot boat	Aldous Ltd.	Brightlingsea	United Kingdom	For Trinity House.
Unknown date	Blue Dolphin	Schooner	Shelburn Shipbuilding Co	Shelburn, Nova Scotia	Canada	
Unknown date	Cellina	Cargo ship	Stabilimento Tecnico Triestino	Trieste	Italy	For private owner.
Unknown date	Florence	Dragger	Franklin G Post	Mystic River, Connecticut	United States	
Unknown date	Ilse L M Russ	Cargo ship	Flensberger Schiffbau Gesellschaft	Flensburg	Germany	For Schiffarts und Assekuranz GmbH
Unknown date	Reomar IV	Motor yacht	Defoe Boat and Motor Works	Bay City, Michigan	United States	
Unknown date	Robert L. Holt	Cargo ship			United Kingdom	For John Holt & Co (Liverpool).
Unknown date	Siegmund	Cargo ship	Ostseewerft	Stettin	Germany	For Emil R Retzlaff
Unknown date	Veracity	Motor drifter	S. Richards & Co.	Lowestoft	United Kingdom	For private owner.
Unknown date	8 unnamed vessels	Barges	Alabama Drydock and Shipbuilding Company	Mobile, Alabama	United States	For private owners.
Unknown date	3 unnamed vessels	Barges	Alabama Drydock and Shipbuilding Company	Mobile, Alabama	United States	For Tennessee Coal, Iron and Railroad Company.
