= 2018 in Germany =

- Decades: 1990s; 2000s; 2010s; 2020s
- See also: Other events of 2018; History of Germany • Timeline • Years

Events in the year 2018 in Germany.

== Incumbents ==
- President: Frank-Walter Steinmeier
- Chancellor: Angela Merkel

== Events ==
=== January ===
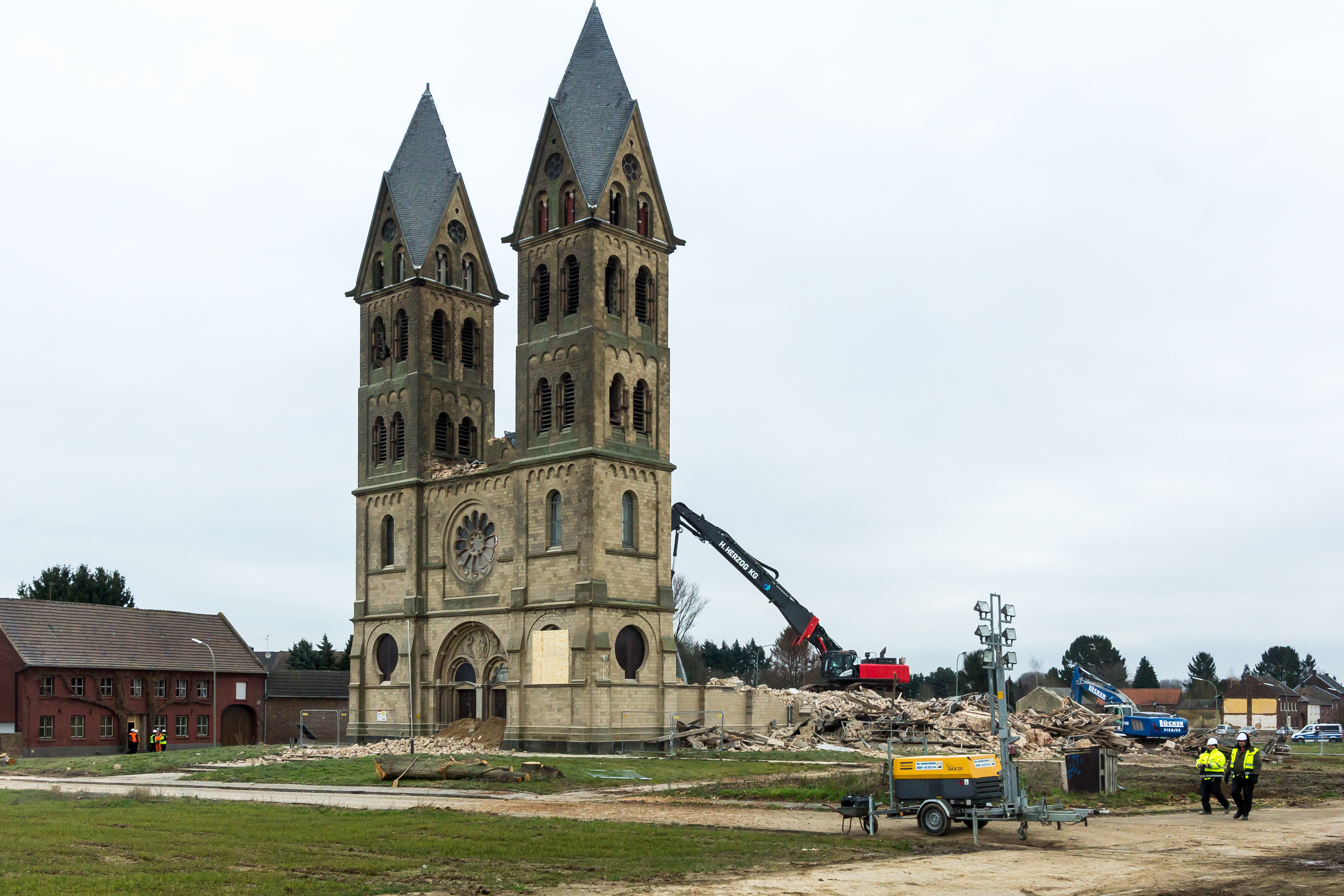
Demolition of the Church of St. Lambertus on 9 January

- In January 2018, American company Energizer takes control over German company VARTA.
- 9 January - The Church of St. Lambertus in Immerath is demolished.

=== February ===
- 15–25 February - 68th Berlin International Film Festival
- 22 February - Germany in the Eurovision Song Contest 2018

=== March ===
- 7 March - Murder of Keira Gross: 14-year-old Keira Gross is stabbed to death in Berlin.
- 14 March - The Fourth Merkel cabinet led by Angela Merkel is sworn in.

=== April ===
- 7 April - 2018 Münster attack - a man crashes into a restaurant in Münster, killing four and wounding twenty before killing himself.
- 12 April - 2018 Hamburg stabbing attack - an immigrant murders his divorced wife and infant.

=== May ===
- 22 or 23 May - 14-year-old German Jewish girl Susanna Feldmann is raped and murdered in Viersen

=== June ===
- 1 June - The state Bavaria pass a Kreuzpflicht Law that requires crosses in all public buildings.
- June: German chemical giant Bayer takeover of American company Monsanto
- 26 June - For the first time the German football team does not reach the knockout stage in the 2018 FIFA World Cup.
- 30 June - German company ThyssenKrupp outsources steel production to a new company, with company seat in Amsterdam. The new company is a fusion of ThyysenKrupp steel production and Indian company Tata Steel.

=== July ===
- 1 July - Interior minister Horst Seehofer offers to resign after rejecting Chancellor Angela Merkel's EU migration deal.

=== August ===
- 6–12 August - 2018 European Athletics Championships in Berlin
- 30 August - In the city of Chemnitz, 8,000-strong far right protests are held after a German man is killed by an Iraqi and a Syrian asylum seeker.

=== September ===
- September - Fusion of German companies Kaufhof and Karstadt
- 18 September - Hans-Georg Maaßen the President of the Federal Office for the Protection of the Constitution is moved from his role to a role as state secretary in Horst Seehofer ministry. after he caused controversy following the 2018 Chemnitz protests, when Maaßen questioned whether there was any credible evidence for such "hunts", and stated that his security agency had in fact not seen any such evidence.

=== October ===
- 14 October - At least three people die and eight are injured when a small plane crashes into a crowd in Fulda.
- 14 October - After Bavarian state election, 2018 the party CSU forms a new government with party Free Voters of Bavaria.
- 28 October - Hessian state election, 2018

=== November ===
- 2 November - The German state of Hesse scraps the death penalty provision from Hesse's state constitution by popular vote, with 83% of the votes in favor.
- 30 November - German company Jack Wolfskin is sold to American company Callaway Golf Company
- November - German company HSH Nordbank is sold to American private equity companies like Cerberus Capital Management and J.C. Flowers & Co.

=== December ===
- 7 December - Annegret Kramp-Karrenbauer succeeds Angela Merkel as the new chairperson of the Christian Democratic Union, one of the major political parties in Germany.

== Deaths ==
=== January ===
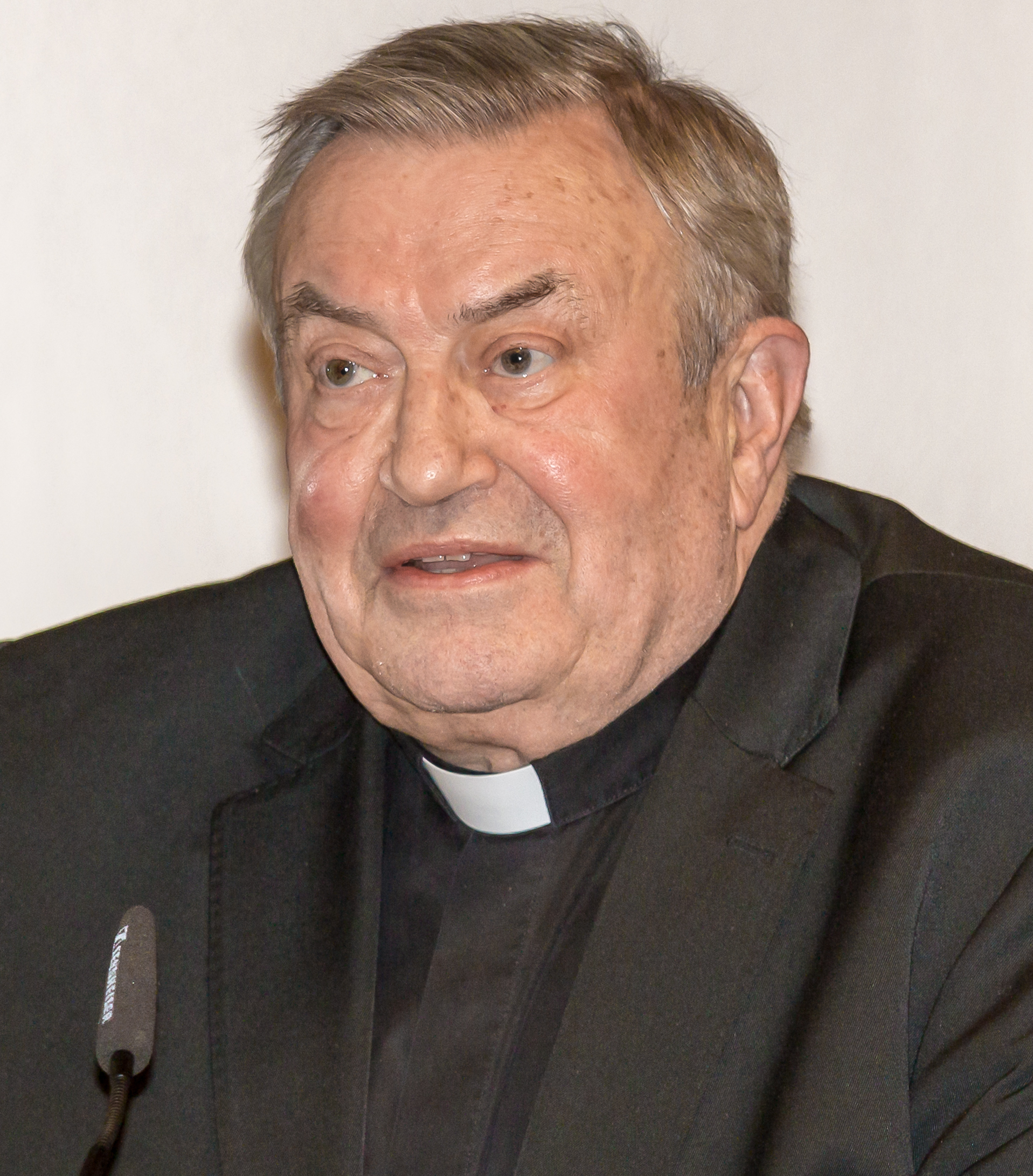
Karl Lehmann

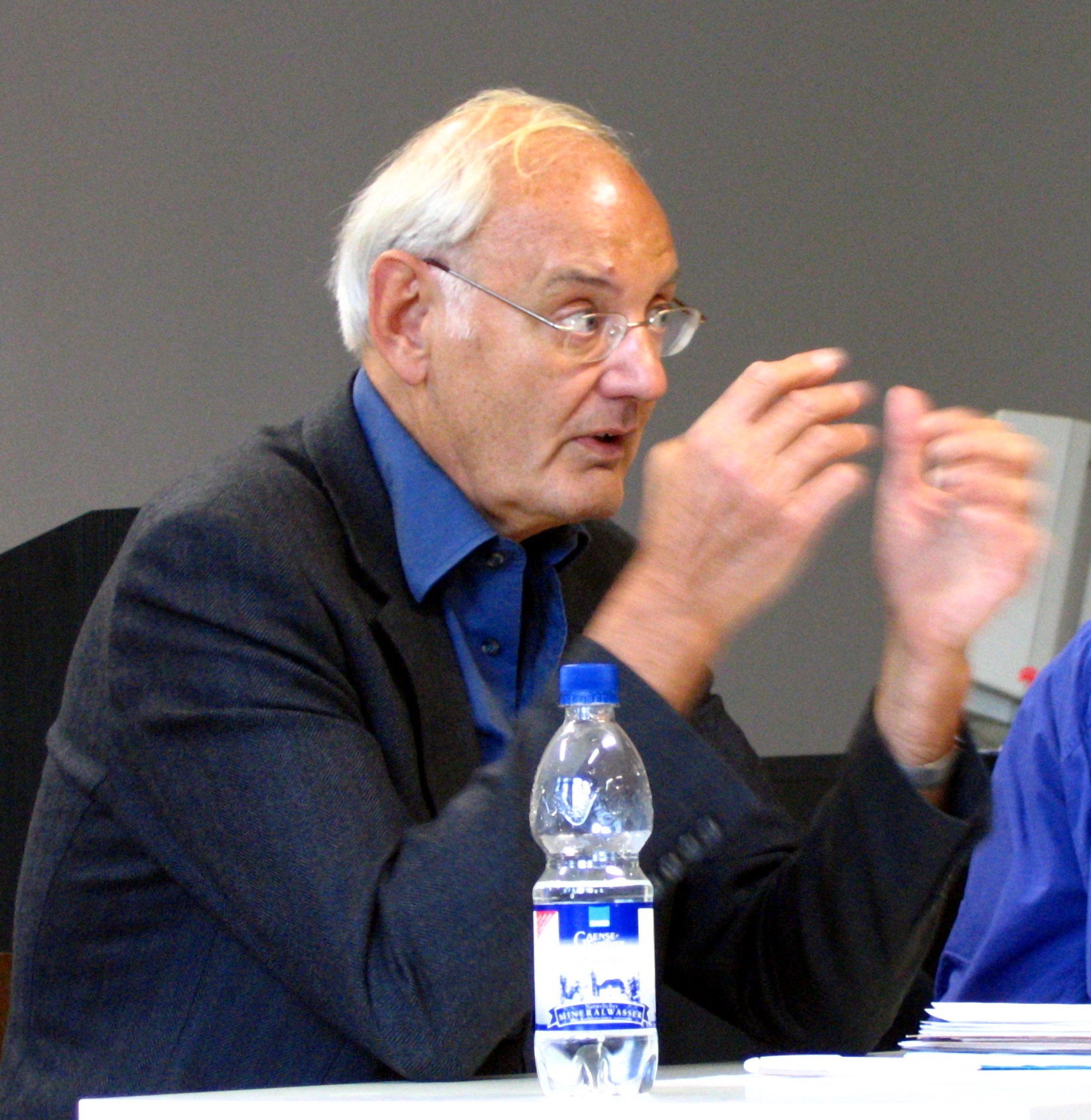
Elmar Altvater

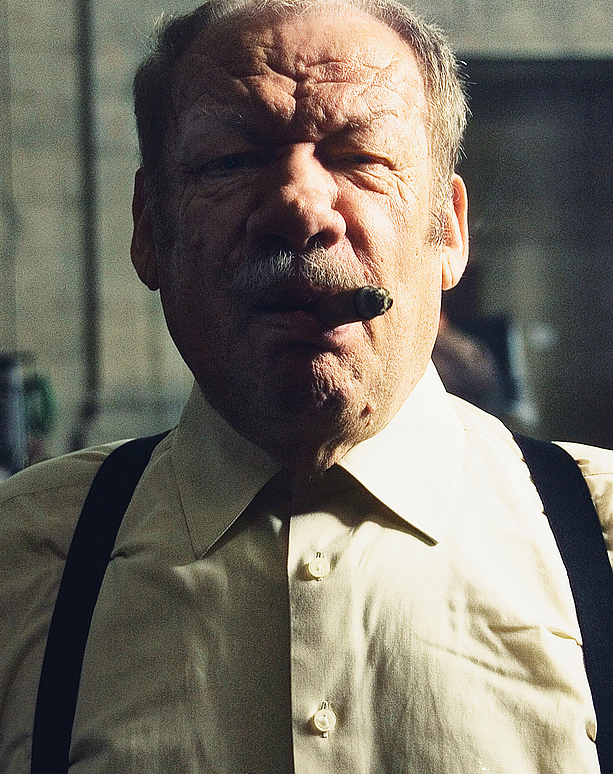
Wolfgang Völz

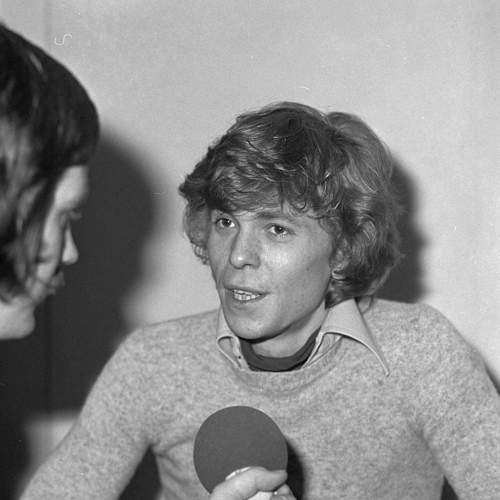
Jürgen Marcus

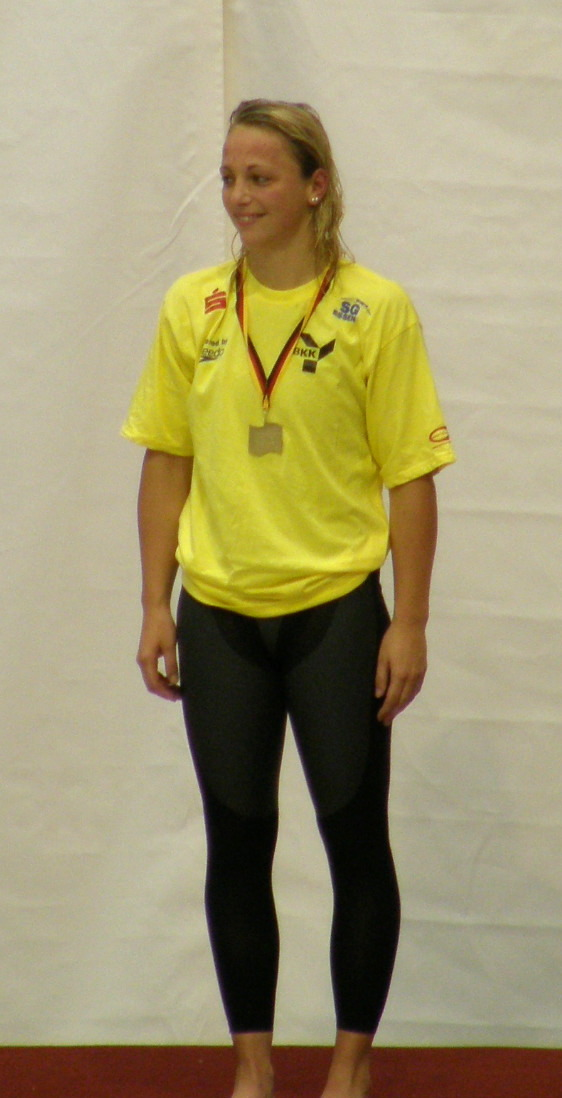
Daniela Samulski

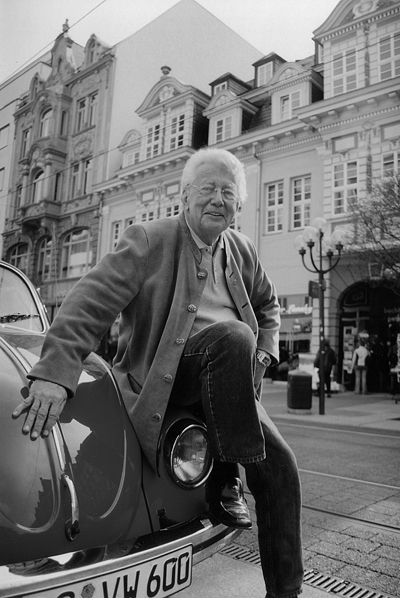
Dieter Thomas Heck

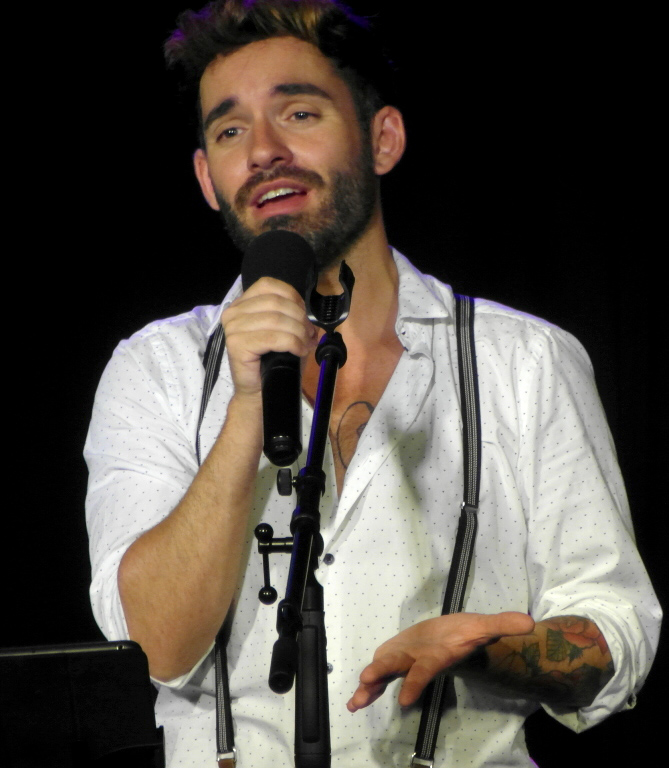
Daniel Küblböck

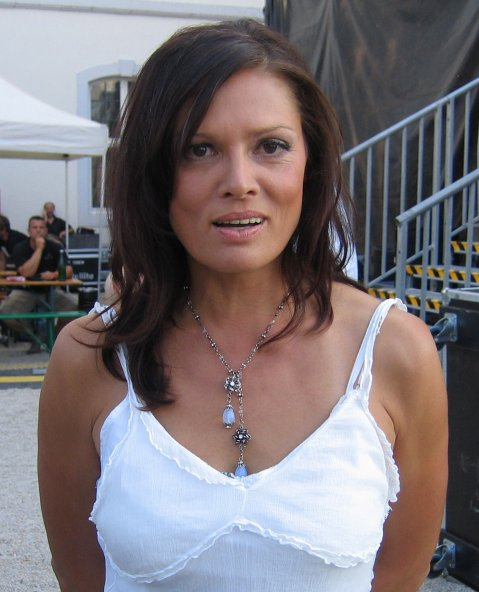
Stefanie Tücking

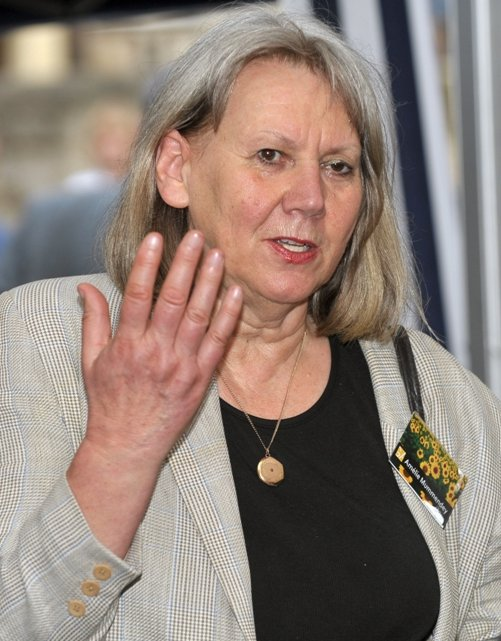
Amélie Mummendey

- 2 January - Michael Pfeiffer, professional football player and manager (born 1925)
- 4 January - Philipp Jenninger, politician (born 1932)
- 5 January - Hans Werner Kettenbach, writer (born 1928)
- 10 January - Leopold Ahlsen, writer and playwright (born 1927)
- 12 January - Heinrich von Stietencron, Indologist (born 1933)
- 15 January - Karl-Heinz Kunde, cyclist (born 1938)
- 30 January - Rolf Schafstall, footballer (born 1937)

=== February ===
- 3 February - Rolf Zacher, actor (born 1941)
- 8 February - Verena Butalikakis, politician (born 1955)
- 14 February - Anton Regh, footballer (born 1940)
- 20 February - Herbert Ehrenberg, politician (born 1926)

=== March ===
- 10 March - Ralf Waldmann, German motorcycle racer (born 1966)
- 11 March - Lorenz Dittmann, art historian (born 1928)
- 11 March - Siegfried Rauch, actor (born 1932)
- 11 March - Karl Lehmann, Roman Catholic Cardinal prelate, Bishop of Mainz (born 1936)
- 17 March - Michael Rutschky, German author, Heinrich-Mann-Prize (born 1943)

=== April ===
- 7 April - Peter Grünberg, German physicist, and Nobel Prize in Physics laureate (born 1939)
- 17 April - Karl Rawer, physicist, specialist in radio wave propagation and the ionosphere (born 1913)
- 19 April - Herbert Pilch, linguist and celtologist (born 1927)
- 25 April - Hans Dresig, Professor for Applied mechanics and Theory of Mechanisms and Machines (born 1937)
- 26 April - Wolfgang Zapf, sociologe (born 1937)

=== May ===
- 1 May - Elmar Altvater, political scientist (born 1938)
- 2 May - Harald Range, German lawyer (born 1948)
- 2 May - Wolfgang Völz, actor (born 1930)
- 17 May - Jürgen Marcus, singer (born 1948)
- 20 May - Dieter Schnebel, composer (born 1930)
- 20 May - Roland Vogt, politician (born 1941)
- 22 May - Daniela Samulski, swimmer (born 1984)

=== June ===
- 9 June - Reinhard Hardegen, German U-boat commander (born 1913)
- 15 June - Enoch zu Guttenberg, conductor (born 1946)
- 18 June - Paul Gratzik, German poet and novelist (born 1935)
- 29 June - Franz Beyer, German musicologist (born 1922)

=== July ===
- 3 July - Karin Eckhold, German actress (born 1938)
- 9 July - Hans Günter Winkler, showjumper (born 1926)
- 14 July - Christa Dichgans, painter (born 1940)
- 24 July - Duke Carl Gregor of Mecklenburg, German nobleman and musician (born 1933)
- 24 July - Walter Hirrlinger, German politician (born 1926)

=== August ===
- 1 August - Rotraut Wisskirchen, biblical archaeologist and academic (b. 1936)
- 23 August - Dieter Thomas Heck, German television moderator (born 1937)
- 26 August - Inge Borkh, German soprano (born 1921)

=== September ===
- 3 September:
  - Klaus Gerwien, German footballer (born 1940)
  - Maria Beig, German author (born 1920)
- 7 September - Hans Oleak, German astrophysicist (born 1930)
- 9 September - Daniel Küblböck, German singer (born 1985)
- September - Rudolf Schieffer, German historian (born 1947)
- 12 September - Hans Kloss, German artist (born 1938)
- 14 September - Walter Remmers, German politician (born 1933)
- 20 September - Conrado Walter, German prelate of Roman Catholic Church in Brazil (born 1923)
- 22 September - Ottokar Runze, German film director (born 1925)

=== October ===
- 1 October - Graciano Rocchigiani, German boxer (born 1963)
- 4 October - Kurt Malangré, German politician (born 1934)
- 4 October - Karl Mildenberger, German boxer (born 1937)
- 11 October - Dieter Kemper, German cyclist (born 1937)
- 16 October - Berthold Leibinger, German entrepreneur (born 1930)
- 16 October - Wilfried Scharnagl, German journalist (born 1938)
- 17 October - Fritz Wittmann, German politician and lawyer (born 1933)
- 22 October - Friedrich Ostermann, German auxiliary bishop of Roman Catholic Church (born 1932)

=== November ===
- 14 November - Rolf Hoppe, German film actor (born 1930)
- 18 November - Klaus Bockisch, German football player (born 1938)
- 20 November - Dietmar Schwager, German football player (born 1940)
- 29 November - Ulrich Leyendecker, German composer (born 1946)
- 30 November - Dagobert Lindlau, German composer (born 1930)

=== December ===
- 1 December - Stefanie Tücking, German radio and television presenter (born 1962)
- 2 December - Lothar Baumgarten, German artist (born 1944)
- 2 December - Bernd Martin, German football player (born 1955)
- 3 December - Markus Beyer, German boxer (born 1971)
- 3 December - Hans-Günther Thalheim, German Germanist and linguist (born 1924)
- 10 December - Johann Georg Reißmüller, German journalist (born 1932)
- 10 December - Robert Spaemann, German philosopher (born 1927)
- 12 December - Wilhelm Genazino, German journalist (born 1943)
- 14 December - Horst Herold, German police officer (born 1923)
- 17 December - Amélie Mummendey, German social psychologist (born 1944)
- 17 December - Jan Stressenreuter, German author (born 1961)
- 20 December - F. W. Bernstein, German poet and cartoonist (born 1938)
- 25 December - Sigi Schmid, German football coach (born 1953)
- 30 December - Edgar Hilsenrath, German writer (born 1926)

== See also ==
- Category:2018 in German television
