= Emil R. Retzlaff =

Shipping company

Emil R. Retzlaff was a major shipping company founded in Stettin, (now Szczecin) in 1898. The company went bankrupt in 1931.

House flag of Emil R. Retzlaff

The business was also involved with the shipbuilders Ostseewerft AG. The company flag consisted of a blue saltire on a white background. The initials E, R and R, also in blue, were placed in the 2nd, 3rd and 4th quarters of the saltire.

== Ships ==
- Chilean ship Micalvi, originally Bragi built by Ostseewerft AG for Emil R. Retzlaff in 1925. Currently a restaurant and museum ship in Puerto Williams.
- SS I P Suhr, originally Siegmund built by Ostseewerft AG for Emil R. Retzlaff in 1926. Sank off Sandhammaren, Sweden in 1950.
