= Lorenz Dittmann =

German art historian

Lorenz Dittmann (27 March 1928, in Munich – 11 March 2018) was a German art historian.

Dittmann studied history of art at the Ludwig-Maximilians-Universität München. In 1955, he completed a Ph.D. dissertation on Grünewald’s color, supervised by Ernst Strauss. In 1958, he moved to the Kunsthistorisches Institut of the RWTH Aachen University, where he wrote a Habilitationsschrift on "Style, Symbol, and Structure" in 1965.

In 1977, he was appointed professor of art history at the Saarland University, Saarbrücken, where he remained until his retirement in 1996.

His extensive work includes major exhibition catalogs and monographs, for instance, German Expressionism: The Colors of Desire (1981), Farbgestaltung und Farbtheorie in der abendländischen Malerei (1987), Kategorien und Methoden der deutschen Kunstgeschichte 1900-1930 (1998), Die Wiederkehr der antiken Götter im Bilde: Versuch einer neuen Deutung (2001), Die Kunst Cezannes: Farbe, Rhythmus, Symbolik (2005), Matisse begegnet Bergson: Reflexionen zu Kunst und Philosophie (2008), Farbgestaltung in der europäischen Malerei - ein Handbuch (2010) and Weltbilder moderner Kunst: Werke von Kandinsky, Klee, Beckmann, Mondrian, Kokoschka im Licht phänomenologischer Philosophien (2013).

Dittmann has accompanied the development of the Saarland Museum and is a founding member of the museum's advisory board, taking over various tasks in the Saarland Cultural Heritage Foundation.

According to Christof Trepesch, Lorenz Dittmann was one of the few art historians who are able to draw the bow from the Middle Ages to contemporary art and who can talk about all genres and styles of art in art history with a secure view of essential facts.
