= Saarland Museum =

Coordinates: 49°13′51″N 7°00′00″E

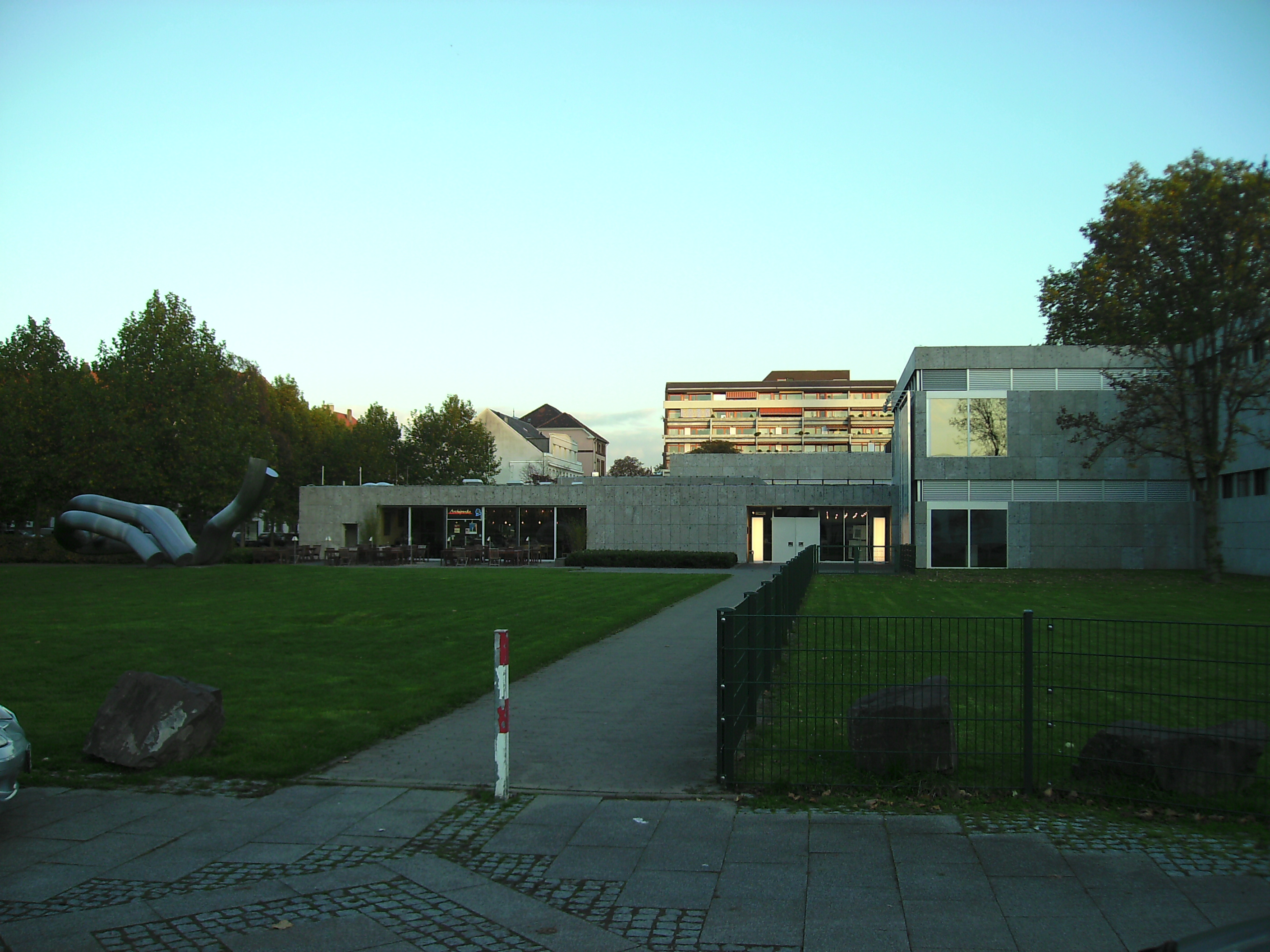
Saarland Museum, Moderne Galerie (Modern Gallery), entrance

Saarland Museum, Saarbrücken

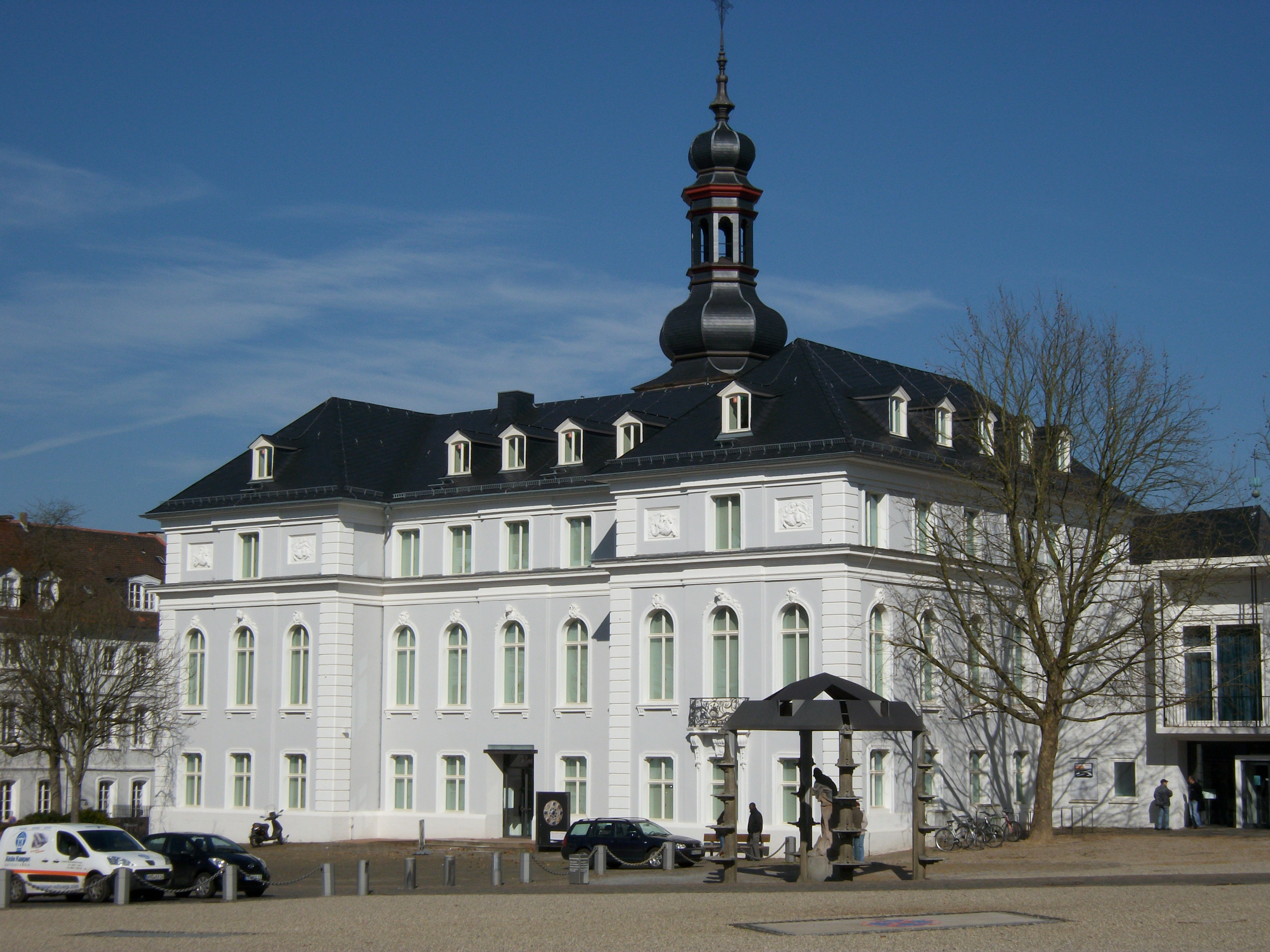
Saarland Museum, Alte Sammlung (Old Collection)

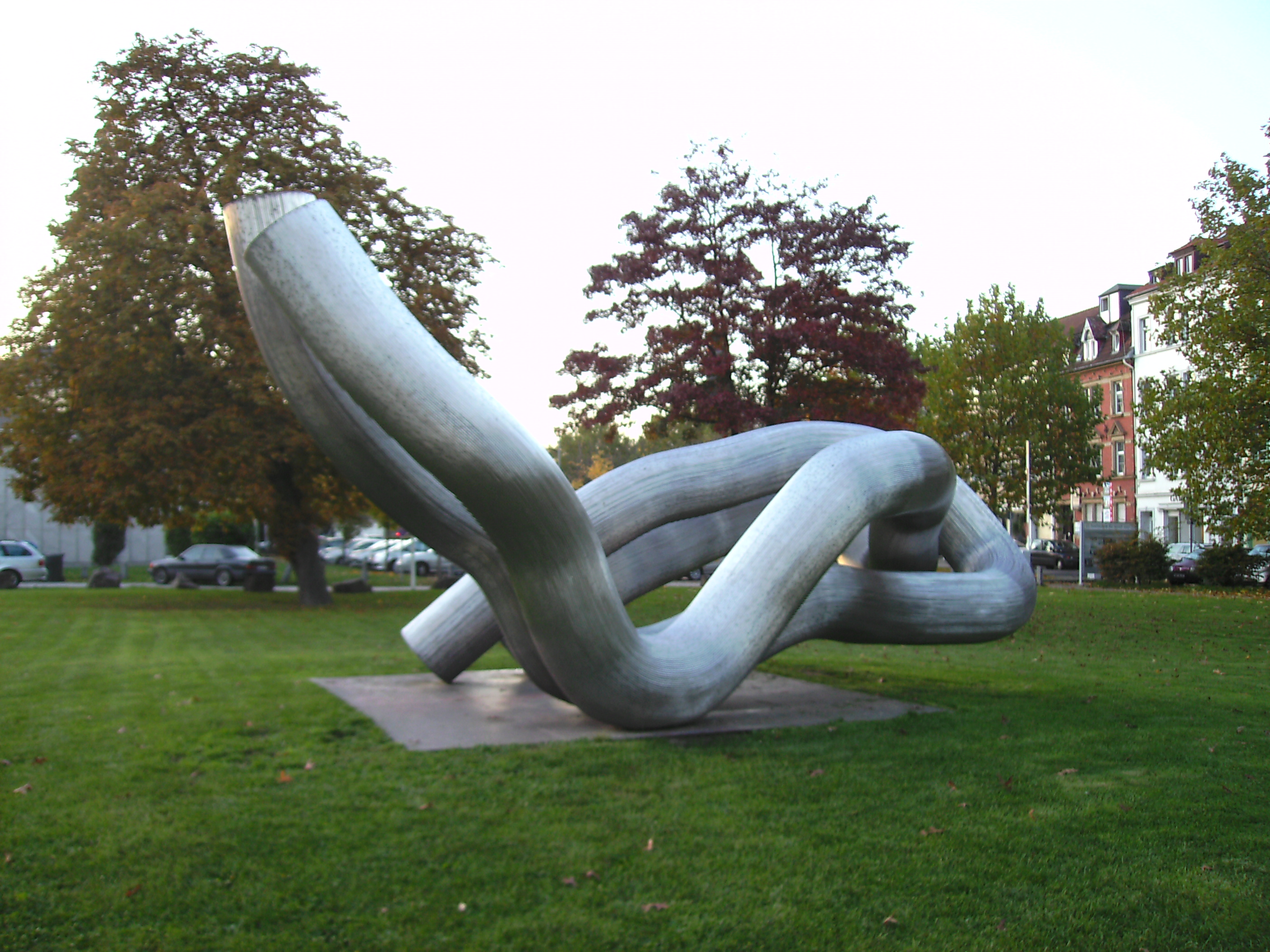
Modern Gallery: Great Gaia, outdoor sculpture.

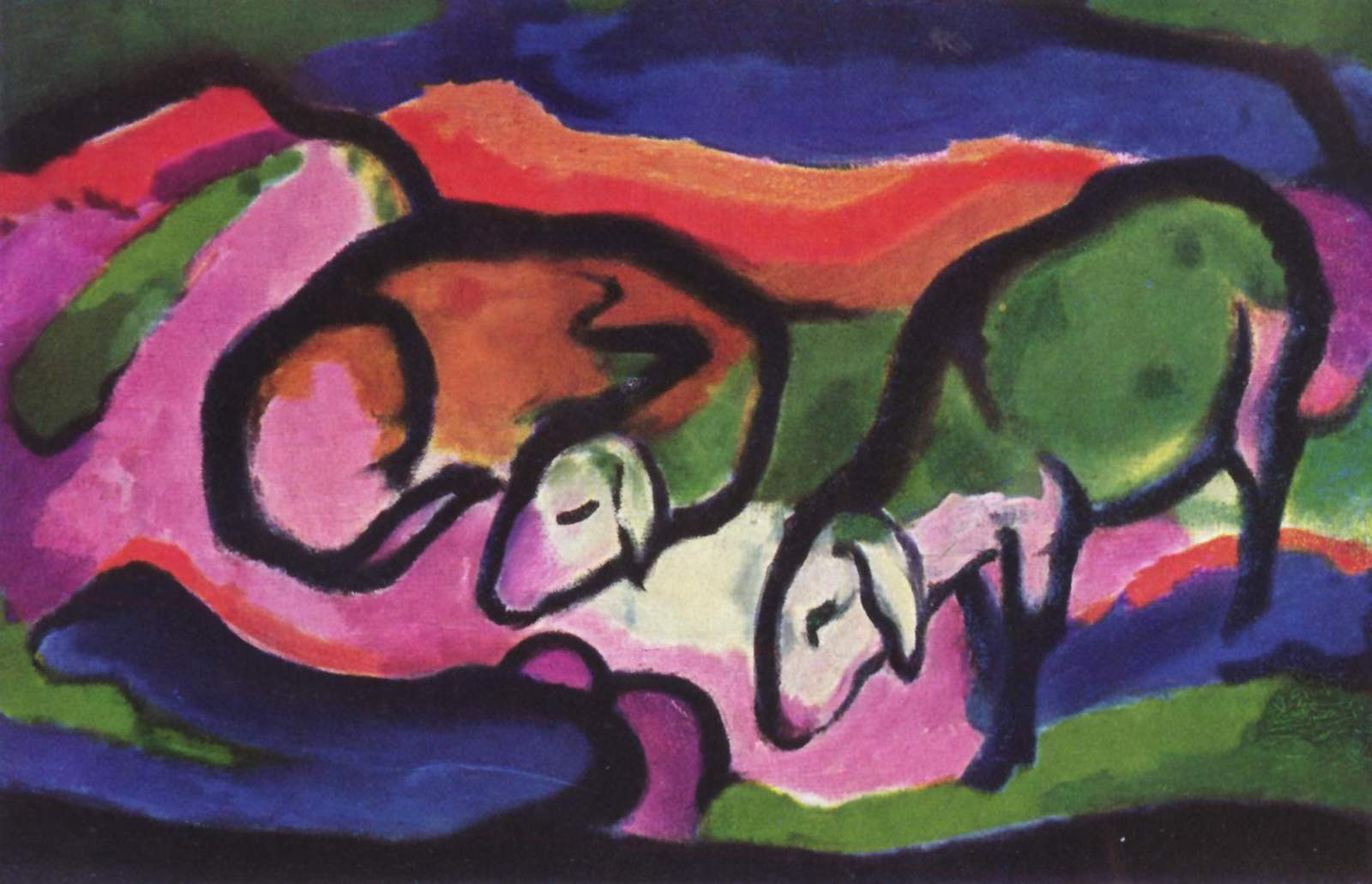
Modern Gallery: Sheep by Franz Marc.

The Saarland Museum is an art museum in Saarbrücken, Saarland, Germany. It is spread across three sites, each with a different specialism.

== Museum in the Palace Church ==
The Museum in the Palace Church (Museum in der Schlosskirche) specialises in religious works from the Middle Ages to the 19th century. It is also notable for its baroque princely graves and the colourful windows by Georg Meistermann. In 2004 the Palace Church was modernised, and connected to the Saarland Museum's Old Collection by a glass construction on the south side of the choir.

== Old Collection ==
The Old Collection (Alte Sammlung) is located in the Kreisständehaus, next to Saarbrücken Palace, and concentrates on artists from the 16th to the 19th centuries. Landscapes and still lifes by 16th- and 17th-century painters such as Abraham Mignon, Joos de Momper and Gillis van Coninxloo are presented alongside works by later artists such as Johann Christian von Mannlich. The collection is divided thematically into different styles of painting, and also includes a presentation of silverware, porcelain, coins, sculptures and furniture.

== Modern Gallery ==
The Modern Gallery (Moderne Galerie) presents art from the 19th century to the present, and is housed in a new building on the opposite bank of the Saar, near the Saarland State Theatre. Temporary exhibitions of classic and contemporary art regularly take place in the exhibition pavilion. The permanent collection includes a large number of works by the American sculptor Alexander Archipenko. There is also an extensive graphics collection with around 18,000 works on paper, the most important of which include freehand drawings and printed graphics from the Berlin Secession, Expressionism, and the Informal Art movement. The photography collection includes the estate of Monika von Boch, a student of Otto Steinert.

== Provenance research project ==
Several provenance research projects have been launched to clarify the ownership history of artworks in the collection of the Modern Gallery at the Saarland Museum, with a focus on the Kohl-Weigand collection, and artworks purchased from European art dealers.
