= Chilean ship Micalvi =

Auxiliary vessel of the Chilean Navy

Coordinates: 54.93514°S 67.61847°W

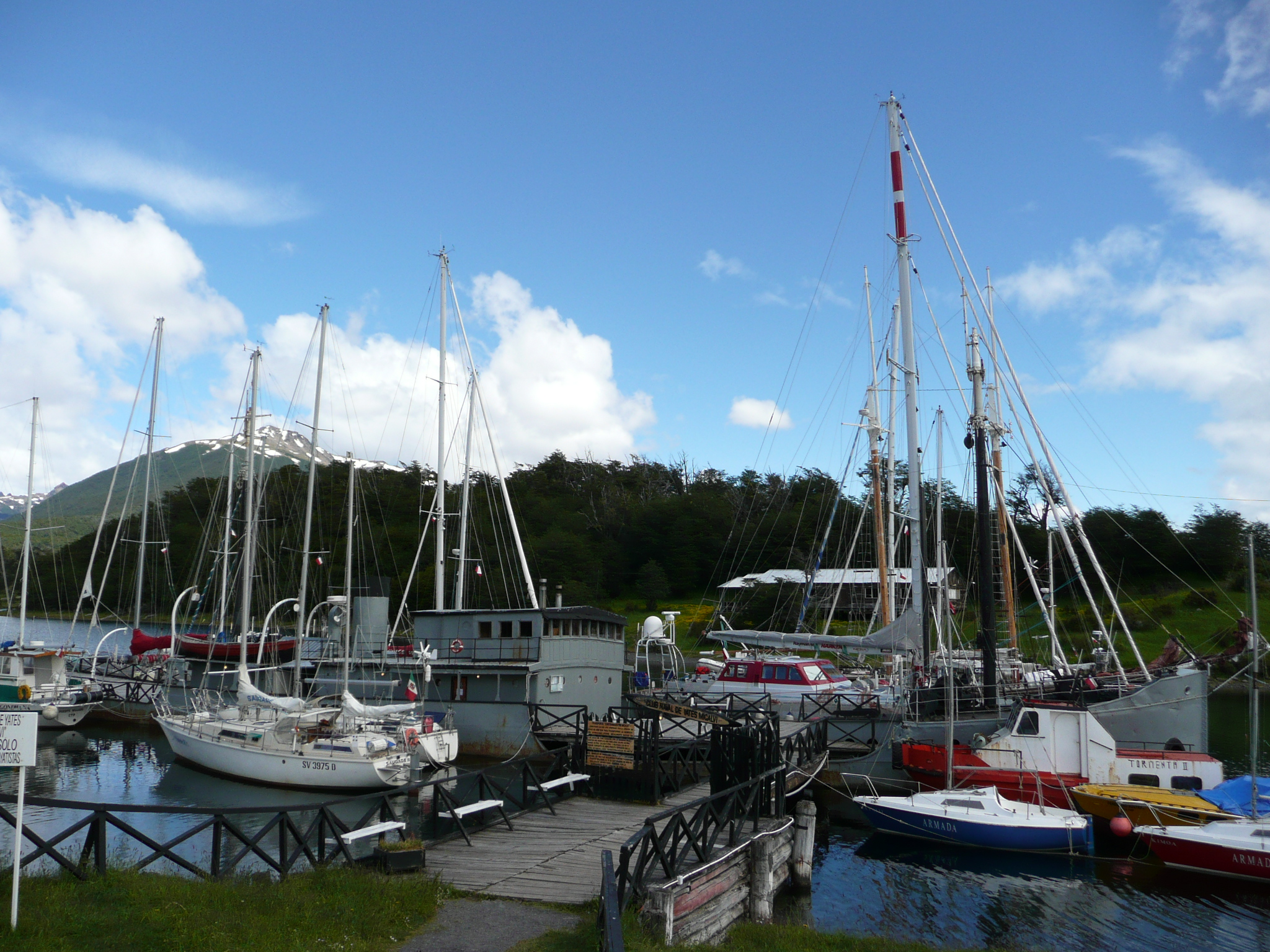
- Micalvi in the marina of Puerto Williams

History

Germany
- Name: Bragi, Bostonlines
- Namesake: Bragi
- Operator: Emil R. Retzlaff, Stettin, Germany, 1926 sold to Otto A. Müller, Hamburg,
- Builder: Ostseewerft in Frauendorf
- Launched: 1925
- Completed: September 1925
- Fate: Sold to Chile, 1928

Chile
- Name: Contramaestre Micalvi
- Namesake: Boatswain Constantino Micalvi, a Greek sailor in the Chilean Navy
- Commissioned: 1928
- Decommissioned: 1961
- Status: Museum ship in Puerto Williams

General characteristics
- Displacement: 850 long tons (864 t)
- Length: 181 ft (55 m) 6 in (0 m)
- Draught: 11 ft (3.4 m)
- Propulsion: One triple expansion steam engine 380 hp.
- Speed: 9.5 knots (17.6 km/h; 10.9 mph)

The Micalvi was an auxiliary vessel of the Chilean Navy.

== Career ==
Built by Ostseewerft in Frauendorf, now Golęcino, as the Bragi in 1925. She was used as a merchant vessel on the Baltic Sea. In 1926 she was sold to O.A. Müller, Hamburg, and renamed Bostonlines.

In 1928 she was sold to the Chilean Navy and sailed from Europe with a cargo of ammunition for the battleship Almirante Latorre, after arrival she was due to be broken up, but, like the Majestic, she was refitted as a supply vessel for the Punta Arenas region, where she gave service to the colonists in sparsely inhabited areas, especial Tortel and Navarino Island.

=== Chilean naval mutiny of 1931 ===
During the Chilean naval mutiny of 1931 she was anchored in Talcahuano under the command of Lt Cdr. Pedro Espina Ritchie but the crew joined the mutiny and brought the ship into the hands of the insurrection. She was ordered to weigh anchor and sail to Lota in order to bring miners to support the rebellion, but there they were seized by Carabineros de Chile, then a cavalry troop of the army dedicated to police tasks.

=== Snipe incident ===
In 1958 the Micalvi crew built a lighthouse on the islet Snipe to improve the navigation on the Beagle Channel. The beacon of the lighthouse was installed on 1 May and it triggered the Snipe incident. The Argentine Navy shelled the Chilean beacon and disembarked an infantry company in the uninhabited islet.

== Museum ship ==
Micalvi was decommissioned in 1961, and then used as pontoon. She was anchored in Puerto Williams in 1961 and declared as an historical ship and museum. Since 2007 used as clubhouse and restaurant in the local yacht harbour.

== See also ==
- Martin Gusinde Anthropological Museum in Puerto Williams
- List of decommissioned ships of the Chilean Navy
