= Franz Josef Kohl-Weigand =

German entrepreneur (1900–1972)

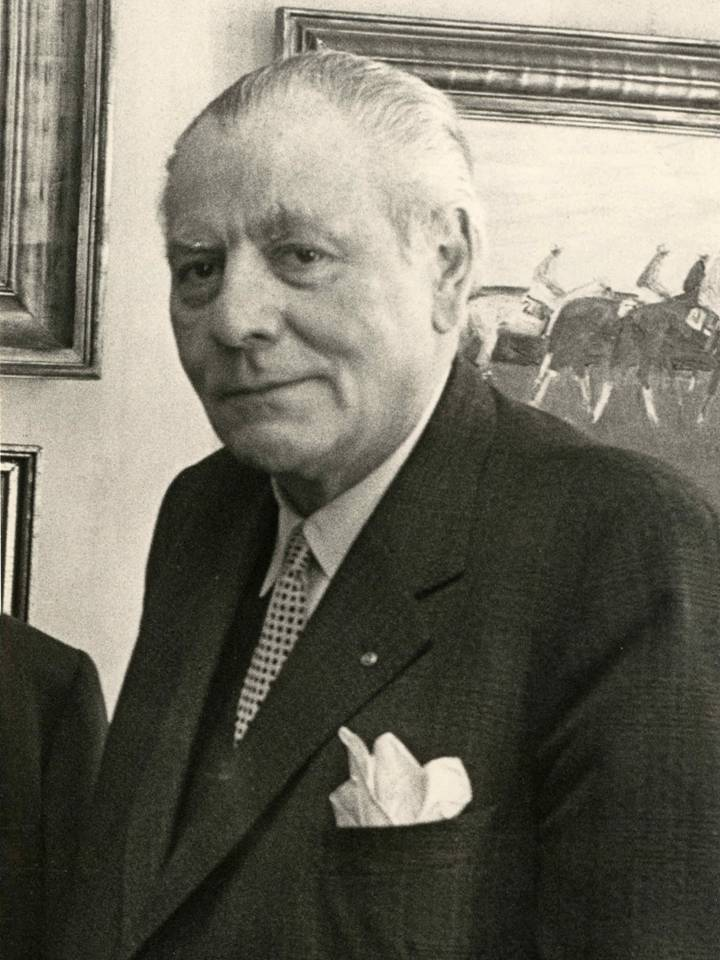
Franz Josef Kohl-Weigand

Franz Josef Kohl-Weigand (born 26 December 1900 in Ludwigshafen am Rhein as Franz Josef Kohl; died 15 March 1972 in St. Ingbert) was a German businessman, art collector and philanthropist.

== Biography ==
Franz Josef Kohl was the first child of Heinrich Kohl, a bank director and supporter of Palatine local history research in Ludwigshafen. He grew up in Ludwigshafen am Rhein. In 1930, he married Auguste Weigand, daughter of the St. Ingbert entrepreneur Ernst Weigand (hardware). Kohl moved to St. Ingbert and took the surname Kohl-Weigand. A year later, Kohl-Weigand joined the management of the company. After World War II, together with his brother-in-law Fritz Saeftel, he led the reconstruction of the "Otto Weigand & Sohn" company, building new office buildings, workers' housing and warehouses. Kohl-Weigand was also involved in regional history and local history research, chairing the St. Ingbert Heimat- und Verkehrsverein for many years.

Franz Josef Kohl-Weigand was buried at the Old Cemetery in St. Ingbert on 20 March 1972.

== The art collector and patron ==
Kohl-Weigand built up an art collection, which focused on the St. Ingbert artists Albert Weisgerber and Fritz Koelle as well as the Palatine artists Hans Purrmann, Max Slevogt and Carl Johann Becker-Gundahl. The collection was described as the "largest collection of German Impressionists in southwestern Germany". In the 1970s, Kohl-Weigand's company had accumulated substantial tax debts. After negotiations with the Saarland tax authorities, in which Franz-Josef Röder, Saarland's prime minister at the time, played a key role, Kohl-Weigand transferred most of his collection to the Saarland, thereby settling his tax debt. The collection was subsequently transferred to the Saarland Cultural Heritage Foundation. A further partial estate of the Kohl-Weigand collection is in the possession of the St. Ingbert city archive.

Provenance research projects have been undertaken to shed light on the origins of the artworks in the Kohl-Weigand collection, and some Nazi-looted artworks have been restituted to Jewish families who were persecuted under the Nazi regime.

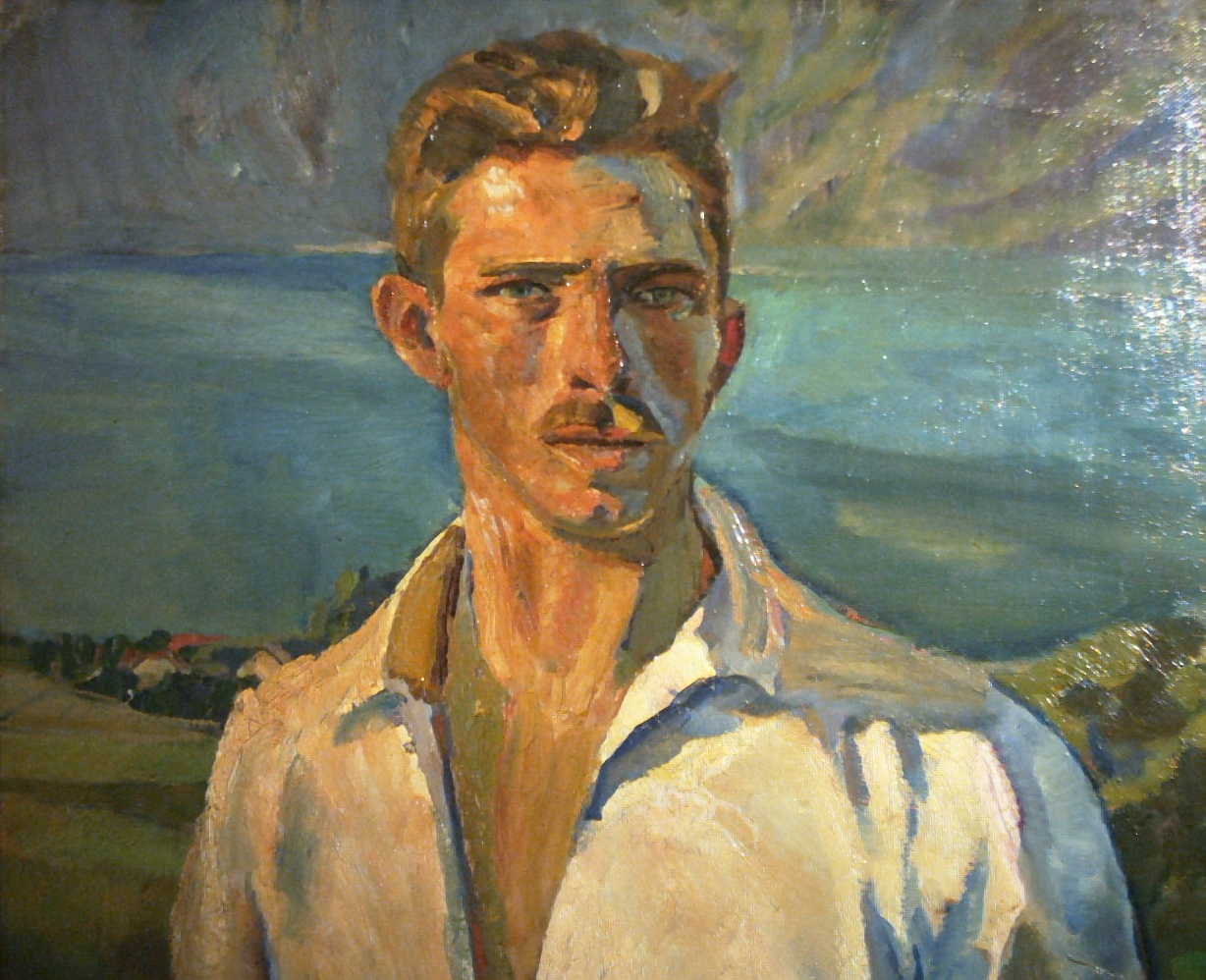
Sammelschwerpunkt: der saarpfälzer Künstler Albert Weisgerber (Selbstporträt, 1911)

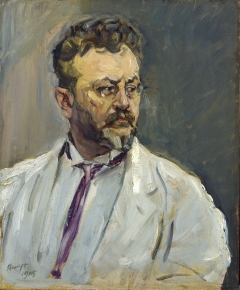
Max Slevogt (Selbstbildnis, 1915)

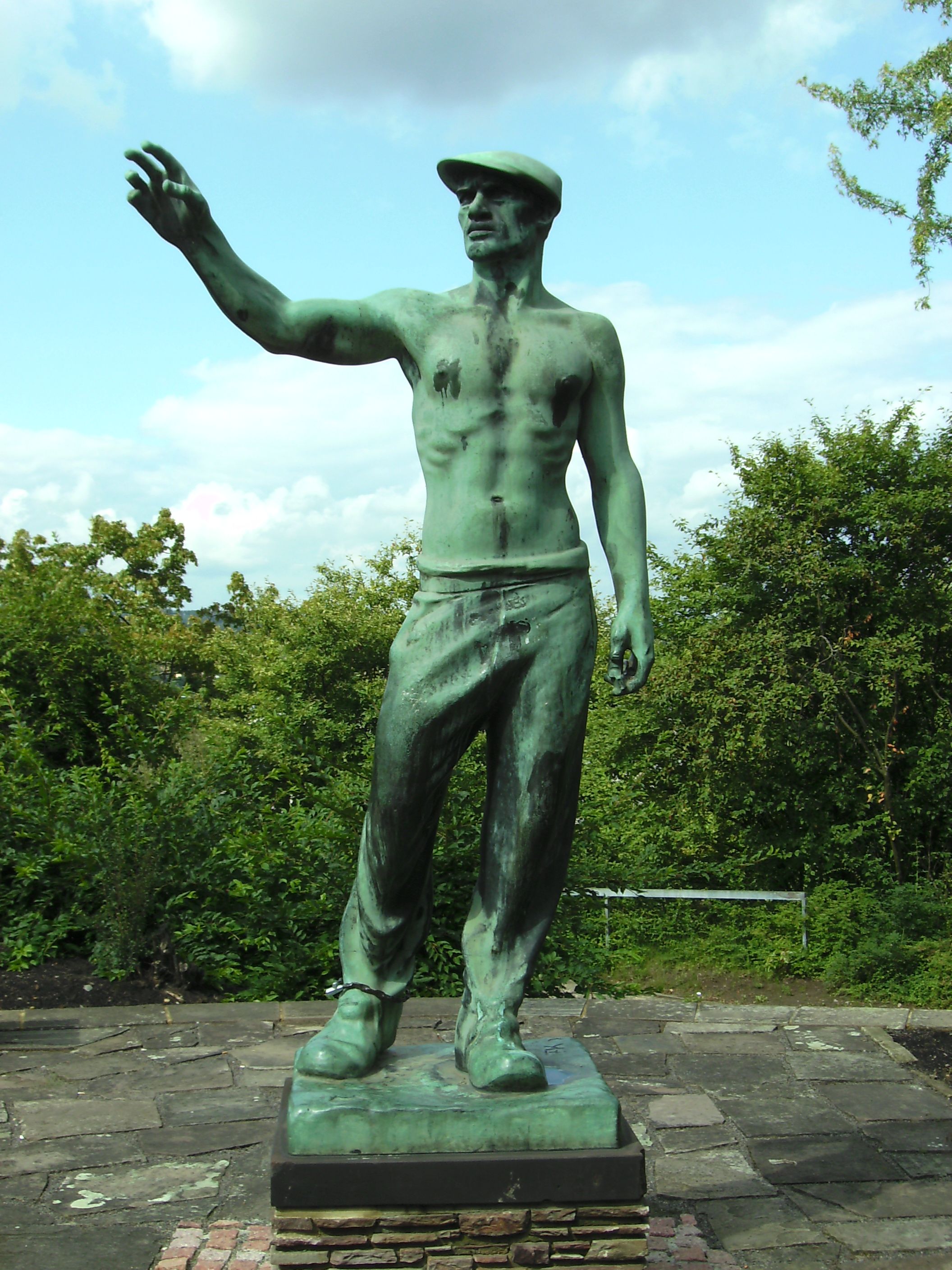
Fritz Koelle: Der Walzmeister (Bronzeplastik)

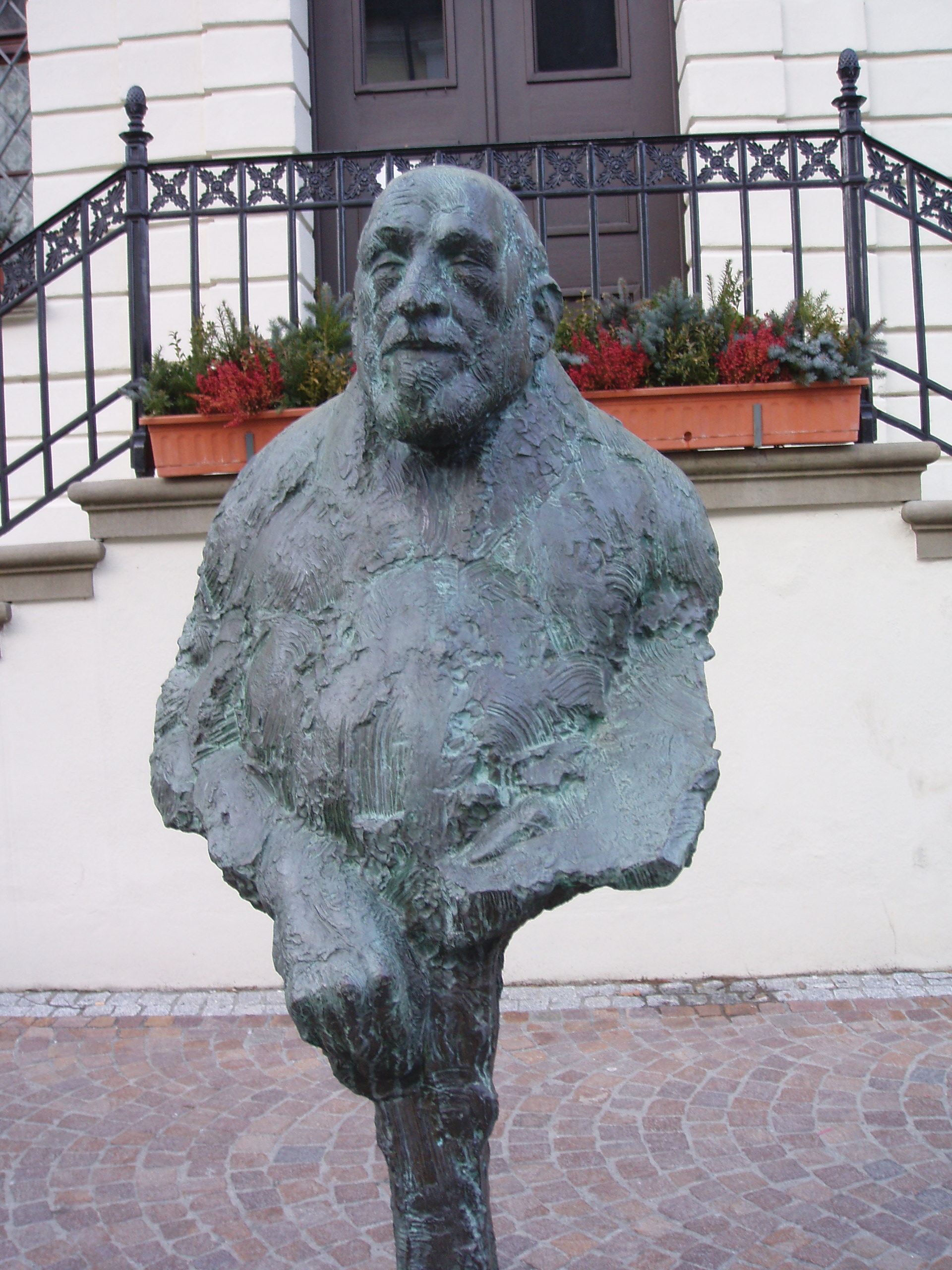
Porträtplastik (Bronze) von Hans Purrmann

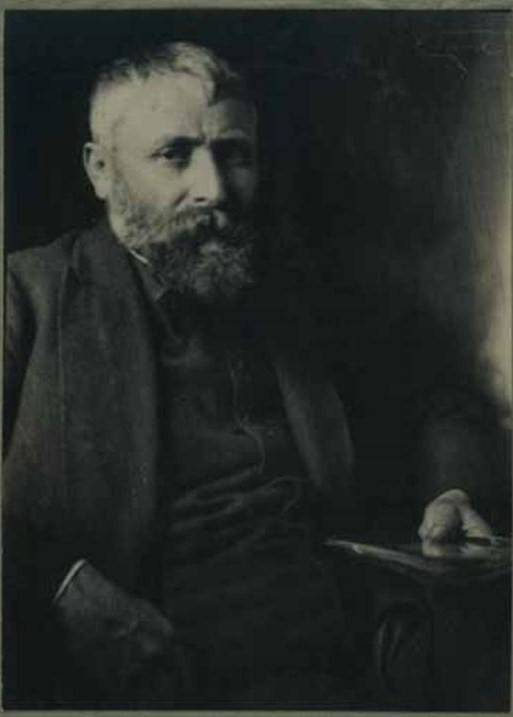
Porträtfoto von Carl Johann Becker-Gundahl

== Honors – awards ==
- 1960 Honorary citizen of the municipality of Ballweiler; honorary citizen of the town of St. Ingbert
- 1961 Awarded the Federal Cross of Merit, 1st class
- 1963 Awarded the Hans Thoma Medal in Reutlingen
- 1965 Honorary Senator of the Johannes Gutenberg University in Mainz
- 1966 Grand Cross of Merit of the Federal Republic of Germany
- 1974 Max Slevogt Medal (posthumously)
- 1980 Naming of Kohl-Weigand-Strasse in St.Ingbert-Mitte
- 1960 Ehrenbürger der Gemeinde Ballweiler; Ehrenbürger der Stadt St. Ingbert

== The family business ==
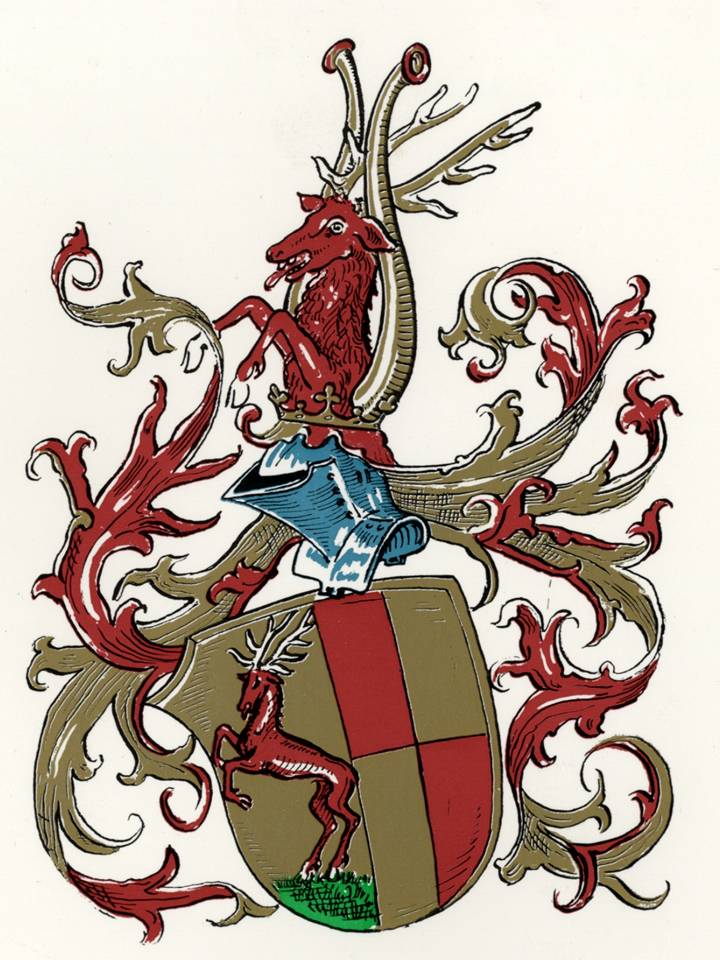
Family coat of arms of the entrepreneurial family Weigand

When Otto Weigand's son Ernst (1874-1949) joined the management of the company in 1902 the company was renamed "Otto Weigand & Sohn". Ernst Weigand then invited his son-in-law into the business. Franz Josef Kohl-Weigand joined in 1931, and another son-in-law, Fritz Saeftel, joined the management in 1936. In 1941, the company had 61 employees, in 1956 it had 120 employees and in 1966 it reached 200 employees. With Kohl-Weigand's son Ernst Heinrich (1932-1988), the fourth and last generation joined the company in 1953, which experienced its slow downturn at the end of the 1960s. The company "Otto Weigand & Sohn" was dissolved in November 1994.

== Literature ==
- Ulrich Christoffel: Albert Weisgerber. Hrsg.: Stadtverwaltung St. Ingbert. Auswahl der Bilder von F. J. Kohl-Weigand. St. Ingbert 1950.
- Albert Weisgerber: Worte seiner Freunde. Hrsg.: Franz Josef Kohl-Weigand. Stadt St. Ingbert 1955.
- Hans-Jürgen Imiela, Wilhelm Weber: Die Sammlung Kohl-Weigand. Moos, Heidelberg 1961 (Private Kunstsammlungen. Band 1).
- Fritz Heinsheimer, Franz Josef Kohl-Weigand (Hrsg.): Max Slevogt als Lehrer, Künstler und Mensch. Selbstverlag der Hrsg., St. Ingbert 1968.
- Albert Weisgerber zeichnet für "Die Jugend". Hrsg.: Pfälzer Künstlergenossenschaft. Mit Beiträgen von Karl Graf und Franz Josef Kohl-Weigand. Karl Graf, Speyer 1971 (Das neue Kunstarchiv. Band 28).
- Kirsten Fitzke: Verlust und Aufbau: Hans Purrmann und seine Sammler Johannes Guthmann und Franz Josef Kohl-Weigand, in: Felix Billeter/Christoph Wagner (Hrsg.): Neue Wege zu Hans Purrmann, Berlin 2016, S. 305–317.
- Literatur von und über Kohl-Weigand in der SULB Saarbrücken.
