= Hans Oleak =

German astrophysicist (1930–2018)

- Born: August 2, 1930
- Died: September 7, 2018 (aged 88)
- Education: University of Jena (PhD)
- Occupation: Astrophysicist

Hans Oleak (2 August 1930 – 7 September 2018) was a German astrophysicist.

Oleak attended both primary and secondary school in his native Upper Silesian town of Bielitz (today Bielsko-Biała). In the course of the expulsions at the end of World War II he came to Meiningen, where he graduated from high school in 1949. From 1950 to 1956 he studied physics with a focus on astrophysics at the University of Jena. He then worked at the Babelsberg Observatory, which was merged with the Central Institute for Astrophysics (now Leibniz Institute for Astrophysics Potsdam) in 1969. Hans Oleak received his doctorate at the University of Jena in 1963, followed in 1973 by a Dissertation B at the Academy of Sciences of the GDR. In 1978 he received the teaching qualification for astronomy from the University of Jena and unsuccessfully applied for the chair. After initial activity in meteorological research, he was head of extragalactic research at the Potsdam Central Institute for Astrophysics from 1969 to 1990. In 1981 he was appointed professor at the Academy of Sciences of the GDR. From 1991 to 1995, Oleak held lectureships at the University of Potsdam, the Humboldt University of Berlin and Technische Universität Berlin.

After German reunification, he was a founding member of the European Astronomical Society (EAS) in 1990 and of the Bildungsverein Urania “Wilhelm Foerster“ Potsdam e.V. in 1991, of which he later became chairman for many years. From 1993 to 1996 he was editor of the astronomical journal Die Sterne. For his engagement in sharing knowledge in astrophysics with an expert audience and the general public alike, he received the honorary office award of the city of Potsdam in 2013.

Oleak was married twice and is the father of three daughters and one son.

== Selected publications ==
- Gasdynamische Vorgänge im Feuerkugelstadium der Meteore (Jena 1963, dissertation)
- Die Tredersche Gravitationstheorie aus der Sicht der beobachtenden Kosmologie (Berlin 1973, dissertation)
