= Ernst Träger =

German judge (1926–2015)

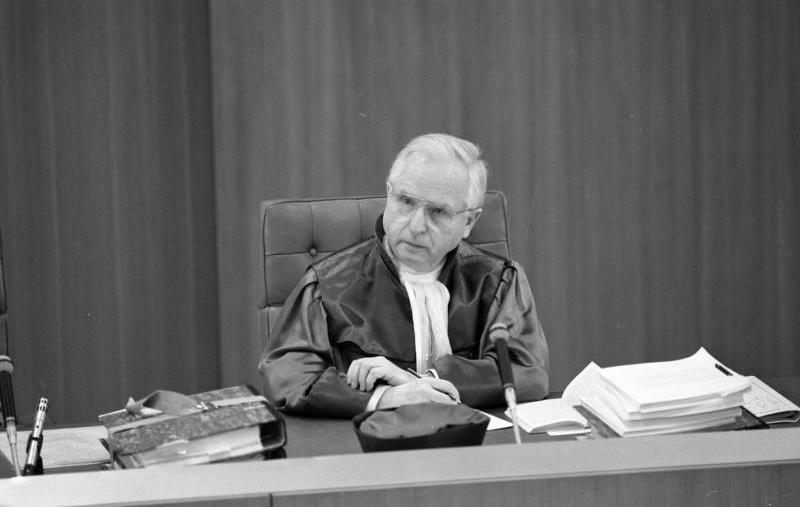
- Ernst Träger in 1989

Justice of the Federal Constitutional Court of Germany
- In office 2 November 1977 – 28 November 1989

Ernst Träger (29 January 1926 in Künzelsau – 25 January 2015 in Waldbronn) was a German judge. He was a justice of the Federal Constitutional Court between 1977 and 1989.

== Biography ==
Ernst Träger, the youngest of eight children of an innkeeper and master butcher from Künzelsau, was an air force and flak helper as well as a soldier in World War II from 1943 to 1946. After being severely wounded, staying in a hospital and being a prisoner of war, he studied law at the Ruprecht-Karls University in Heidelberg from 1947. In Mannheim, he completed his legal clerkship at the Mannheim District Court. After passing his assessor's examination in 1954, he entered the judicial service of the state of Baden-Württemberg, where he worked as a civil and criminal judge at the Bad Säckingen Local Court and the Waldshut Regional Court. In 1958, he moved to the Federal Prosecutor's Office. In 1963, he became a judge at the Karlsruhe Regional Court and later at the Karlsruhe Higher Regional Court. From 1965 to 1968, Träger was a research assistant at the Federal Constitutional Court. In 1968, he again moved to the Federal Prosecutor's Office and was appointed Federal Prosecutor in 1972, dealing with various terrorist trials. In 1976, he was appointed a judge at the Federal Supreme Court.
