= Berthold Wulf =

German priest, poet and philosopher

Berthold Wulf (July 2, 1926 – June 11, 2012) was a German priest, poet and philosopher.

== Life ==
Wulf was born in Hanover, Province of Hanover. He was the third child of Bertha Wulf and Karl Wulf, who was a musician and conductor. He spent his childhood with his elder brother and his twin brother in Hildesheim near Hanover. When he was 17 he had to join the German army. He survived World War II as a common soldier.

=== Religious work ===
After the war he became a goldsmith. But he came into contact with anthroposophy and so he decided to become a priest of the Christian Community. In 1953 he received ordination to the priesthood in Stuttgart. Afterwards he worked as a priest in Berlin, Heidelberg, Heidenheim an der Brenz where he also taught the subject 'religion' at the local Rudolf Steiner School (Waldorfschule Heidenheim), and Zürich, where he worked until his retirement. In 1954 he married Ingeborg Köhler.

He has given more than 8,000 lectures and his complete edition consists of 26 volumes on 17,343 pages. Most of his work is poetry, but he also wrote philosophical books. His topics are anthroposophy and christianity.

== Work (selection) ==
- Canticum Mundi. Okeanos Verlag, Zürich
- Ewiges Evangelium. Okeanos Verlag, Zürich
- Melissa. Okeanos Verlag, Zürich
- Goethe und Hegel. Okeanos Verlag, Zürich
- Christentum und Sakrament. Okeanos Verlag, Zürich
- Das mythische Jahr.Okeanos Verlag, Zürich
- Nur einen Sommer.Okeanos Verlag, Zürich
- Divinitas Mundi. Okeanos Verlag, Zürich
- Idee und Liebe. Okeanos Verlag, Zürich
- Gedanke und Gegenwart. Okeanos Verlag, Zürich
- Natur und Geist. Okeanos Verlag, Zürich
- Die Kategorien des Aristoteles. Okeanos Verlag, Zürich
- Im Zeichen des Rosenkreuzes. Okeanos Verlag, Zürich
- Christologie des Bewusstseins. Okeanos Verlag, Zürich
- Das Jahr unseres Herrn. Okeanos Verlag, Zürich
- Es kann geschehen…Bruchstücke einer grossen christlichen Konfession. Okeanos Verlag, Zürich
- Jesus Christus vere homo vere Deus. Okeanos Verlag, Zürich
- Anthropos Sophia. Okeanos Verlag, Zürich
- Gott und Welt und Mensch. Okeanos Verlag, Zürich
