= German trawler V 312 Hanseat =

German fishing trawler

History
- Name: Sirius (1926–29); Hanseat (1929–42)
- Owner: Sirius Handels GmbH (1926–29); Hanseatische Hochseefischerei (1929–41); Kriegsmarine (1941–42)
- Port of registry: (Weimar Republic) Germany (1926–29); (Weimar Republic) Altona, Germany (1929–33); (Nazi Germany) Altona, Germany (1933–41); Kriegsmarine (1941–42)
- Builder: J. C. Tecklenborg
- Yard number: 406
- Launched: 5 August 1926
- Out of service: 20 August 1942
- Identification: Code Letters QVLB (1926–34); Fishing boat registration BX 189 (1926–41); Code Letters DQNV (1934–42); Pennant Number V 312 (1941–42)
- Fate: Wrecked

General characteristics
- Type: Fishing trawler (1926–41); Vorpostenboot (1941–42)
- Tonnage: 305 GRT, 109 NRT
- Length: 44.50 m (146 ft 0 in)
- Beam: 7.60 m (24 ft 11 in)
- Draught: 3.68 m (12 ft 1 in)
- Depth: 4.15 m (13 ft 7 in)
- Installed power: Triple expansion steam engine, 100nhp
- Propulsion: Single screw propeller
- Speed: 11 knots (20 km/h)

Hanseat was a German fishing trawler that was built in 1926 as Sirius. Renamed Hanseat in 1929, she was requisitioned by the Kriegsmarine in the Second World War for use as a Vorpostenboot, serving as V 312 Hanseat. She ran aground and was wrecked in September 1942.

== Description ==
The ship 44.50 metres (146 ft 0 in) long, with a beam of 7.60 metres (24 ft 11 in). She had a depth of 4.15 metres (13 ft 7 in) and a draught of 3.68 metres (12 ft 1 in). She was assessed at 305 GRT, 109 NRT. She was powered by a triple expansion steam engine, which had cylinders of 33 centimetres (13 in), 53 centimetres (21 in) and 80 centimetres (31 1/2 in) diameter by 60 centimetres (23 3/4 in) stroke. The engine was built by J. C. Tecklenborg. It was rated at 100nhp. It drove a single screw propeller via a low-pressure turbine. It could propel the ship at 10 knots (19 km/h).

== History ==
Sirius was built as yard number 406 by J. C. Tecklenborg, Geestemünde, Germany for Sirius Handels GmbH, Germany. She was launched on 5 August 1926 and completed on 3 September. The fishing boat registration BX 189 was allocated, as were the Code Letters QVLB. In 1929, she was sold to the Hanseatische Hochseefisherei. Her port of registry was Altona. In 1934, her Code Letters were changed to DQNV, On 13 January 1931, Hanseat sank at Bremerhaven. She was refloated two days later.

She was scheduled to have participated in Unternehmen Seelöwe in 1940. On 3 May 1941, Hanseat was requisitioned by the Kriegsmarine for use as a vorpostenboot. She was allocated to 3 Vorpostenflotille as V 312 Hanseat. On 20 August 1942, she ran aground and was wrecked on Naissaar, Soviet Union.

== Sources ==
- Gröner, Erich (1993). Die deutschen Kriegsschiffe 1815-1945 (in German). Vol. 8/I: Flußfahrzeuge, Ujäger, Vorpostenboote, Hilfsminensucher, Küstenschutzverbände (Teil 1). Koblenz: Bernard & Graefe. ISBN 3-7637-4807-5.
