= USS Ability (PYc-28) =

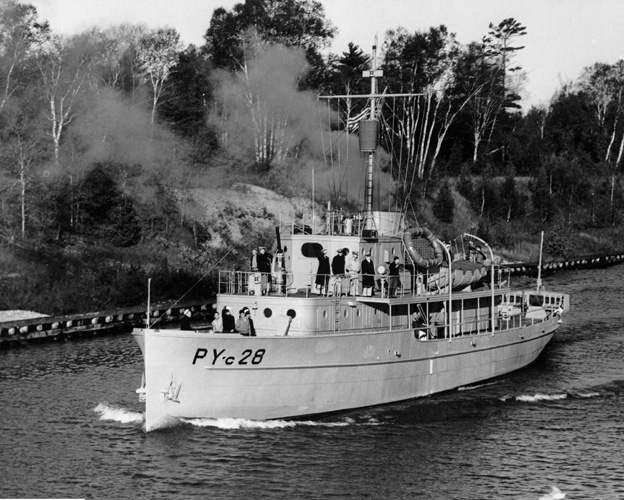
- USS Ability (PYc-28)

History

United States
- Name: USS Ability
- Builder: Defoe Boat and Motor Works, Bay City, Michigan
- Launched: 1926
- Acquired: by purchased, 12 March 1942
- Commissioned: 28 September 1942
- Decommissioned: 29 September 1944
- Stricken: 1 October 1945
- Fate: To Maritime Commission for disposal, 18 May 1946

General characteristics
- Type: Patrol boat
- Displacement: 280 long tons (284 t)
- Length: 133 ft (41 m)
- Beam: 21 ft 6 in (6.55 m)
- Draft: 8 ft (2.4 m)
- Speed: 13 knots (24 km/h; 15 mph)
- Complement: 43
- Armament: 1 × 20 mm gun; 2 × depth charge tracks

The first USS Ability (PYc-28) was a yacht in the service of the United States Navy used for anti-submarine warfare during World War II.

== Service history ==
She was built as Reomar IV in 1926 at Bay City, Michigan by Defoe Boat and Motor Works, and purchased by the Navy on 12 March 1942. She was renamed Ability and assigned hull number PYc-28. Commissioned on 28 September 1942.

After a brief period of shakedown training, Ability reported in November 1942 to Commander, Eastern Sea Frontier, and through the late autumn and winter performed patrol duty. Between March 1943 and September 1944, Ability was attached to the Fleet Sonar School, Key West, Florida. There, she participated in antisubmarine warfare training exercises and carried out harbor guard duties.

The ship was decommissioned on 29 September 1944, and placed in an "in service" status for duty as a naval reserve training ship at Tompkinsville, New York. Ability was placed out of service on 19 September 1945, and was struck from the Navy list on 1 October 1945. She was turned over to the Maritime Commission for disposal on 18 May 1946.
