= Rotraut Wisskirchen =

German biblical archaeologist

Rotraut Wisskirchen (23 June 1936 – 1 August 2018) was a German Christian archaeologist.

Wisskirchen was born on 23 June 1936 in Hagen and studied law in Munich and Bonn; then she worked from 1965 to 1967 as a lawyer in the Federal Ministry of Housing and Urban Development. She was married to the lawyer Alfred Wisskirchen, with whom she had two daughters, also lawyers.

In 1981 she began studying Christian Archeology, Ancient Church History and Patrology at the University of Bonn, graduating in 1989 with Josef Engemann. The topic of the dissertation was The mosaic program of S. Prassede in Rome. Iconography and iconology. From 1989 to 2017 she was a regular lecturer at the Universities of Bonn, Mainz, Cologne, Bochum and Wuppertal. Through regular annual excursions to the archaeologically relevant sites, she made sure that students got to know the scenes of late antique history in southern Europe and the Middle East from their own point of view. In 2000, the Catholic Theological Faculty of the University of Bochum appointed her - as the second woman and first Protestant - honorary professor. In 2011, she was awarded the Cross of Merit on the ribbon of the Order of Merit of the Federal Republic of Germany.
