= Amélie Mummendey =

German social psychologist (1944–2018)

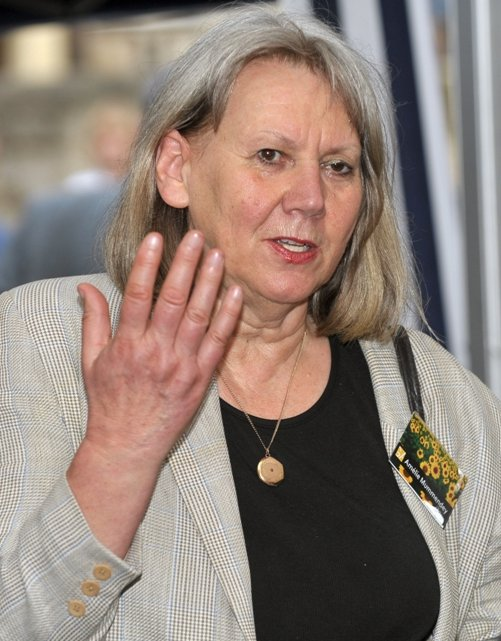
- Mummendey in 2009
- Born: 19 June 1944; Bonn, Germany
- Died: 17 December 2018 (aged 74); Jena, Germany

Academic background
- Education: University of Bonn (M.Sc.); University of Mainz (PhD); University of Münster (habilitation)

Academic work
- Discipline: Psychologist
- Sub-discipline: Social psychology
- Institutions: University of Jena
- Main interests: Intergroup relations

Amélie Mummendey (19 June 1944 in Bonn, Germany – 17 December 2018 in Jena, Germany) was a German social psychologist. From 2007 until her death, she was a Vice-Rector for the Graduate Academy at the Friedrich Schiller University Jena.

== Biography ==
Amélie Mummendey completed her M.Sc. in Psychology at the University of Bonn, followed by her PhD at the University of Mainz in 1970, and her Habilitation at the University of Münster in 1974. She held a chair in social psychology at the University of Münster (1980–1997) before taking up a chair in social psychology at the Friedrich Schiller University Jena in 1997. In 2007, Mummendey was elected as the first Vice-Rector for the Graduate Academy at the University of Jena.

== Research ==
Her research addressed the social psychology of social identity and relations between social groups, in particular she investigated determinants of negative intergroup attitudes and behaviors as well as determinants of tolerance, acceptance, and appreciation of outgroups. While employing both experimental and field research, Amélie Mummendey and colleagues investigated social psychological issues of high social relevance such as the “positive-negative-asymmetry” in social discrimination and strategies to cope with threatened or negative social identities.

Amélie Mummendey was particularly interested in determinants of both discrimination and tolerance between social groups, conflict and cooperation, constructive versus destructive coping with social change, threats to social identities and limitations of tolerance and affiliation of outgroup members. Amélie Mummendey and colleagues empirical findings as well as a number of new theoretical models developed by them have been published in numerous books and prestigious journals. She died on 17 December 2018.

== Ingroup Projection Model ==
Together with Michael Wenzel, Amélie Mummendey developed the ingroup projection model (IPM).

The IPM holds that members of one group always compare themselves to members of another group (e.g., Germans and Italians) by constantly using as a frame of reference a common superordinate group (e.g., Europeans). When a superordinate category is salient, subgroup members tend to project characteristics of their subgroup identity onto the prototype of the superordinate category. Therefore, members of one’s own subgroup appear to be good representatives — better members — of the superordinate category, while out-group members appear to be poorer representatives. Consequently, outgroup members are derogated and discriminated because they appear to deviate from the desired characteristics of the superordinate category.

A number of empirical studies support the main claims of the model and recent developments of underlying motivational and cognitive processes contribute to a deeper understanding of ingroup projection. Current research investigates, among other things, new pathways for the reduction or avoidance of ingroup projection and therefore possibilities to foster intergroup tolerance.

== Honorary memberships ==
- Member of the German Council of Science and Humanities (Wissenschaftsrat), 1997–2002
- Member of European Science Foundation (ESF), 1999–2005
- Member of ‘Deutsche Akademie der Naturforscher Leopoldina’, since 2001
- Chair of the Board of Trustees, Einstein Foundation Berlin, since 2009
- Fellow of the Association for Psychological Science, since 2009

== Awards ==
- European Association of Experimental Social Psychology’s Henri Tajfel Award
- German Psychological Societys' German Psychology Award
- Thuringian Research Prize 2009 (together with Thomas Kessler, Thorsten Meiser and Kai Sassenberg)

== Publications (selection) ==
=== Books ===
- Bedingungen aggressiven Verhaltens (Determinants of Aggressive Behaviour), 1975, Bern: Huber
- Social Psychology of Aggression: From Individual Behavior to Social Interaction, 1984, Springer, ISBN 0-387-12443-8
- Soziale Einstellungen (Social Attitudes), 1986, Juventa, ISBN 3-7799-0304-0
- Identität und Verschiedenheit (Identity and Distinctiveness), 1997, Bern: Huber, ISBN 3-456-82810-1

=== Articles ===
- Mummendey, A., Kessler, T., Klink, A., & Mielke, R. (1999). Strategies to cope with negative social identity: Predictions by social identity theory and relative deprivation theory. Journal of Personality and Social Psychology, 7, 229-245.
- Mummendey, A., & Otten, S. (1998). Positive-negative asymmetry in social discrimination. European Review of Social Psychology, 9, 107-143.
- Mummendey, A., & Wenzel, M. (1999). Social discrimination and tolerance in intergroup relations: Reactions to intergroup difference. Personality and Social Psychology Review, 3, 158 -174.
- Kessler, T. & Mummendey, A. (2002). Sequential or parallel processes? A longitudinal field study concerning determinants of identity management strategies. Journal of Personality and Social Psychology, 82, 75-88.
- Waldzus, S. & Mummendey, A. (2004). Inclusion in a superordinate category, ingroup prototypicality, and attitudes towards outgroups. Journal of Experimental Social Psychology, 40, 466-477.
- Wenzel, M., Mummendey, A., & Waldzus, S. (2003). The ingroup as pars pro toto: Projection from the ingroup onto the inclusive category as a precursor to social discrimination. Personality and Social Psychology Bulletin, 29, 461-471.
- Wenzel, Mummendey, & Waldzus (2007). Superordinate identities and intergroup conflict: The ingroup projection model. European Review of Social Psychology, 18, 331-372.
