= SS Quersee =

20th century cargo ship

History
- Name: Amrum (1926-31); Quersee (1931-45); Empire Condor (1945-47); Mediterranean Trader (1947-49); Maharashmi (1949-51)
- Owner: Schröder, Hölken & Fischer (1926-31); W Schuchmann (1931-45); Ministry of War Transport (1945); Ministry of Transport (1945-46); Akritas Navigation Co (1946-49); Det South East Asia Shipping Co (1949-51)
- Operator: Schröder, Hölken & Fischer (1926-31); W Schuchmann (1931-45); Ministry of War Transport (1945); Ministry of Transport (1945-46); Akritas Navigation Co (1946-49); Det South East Asia Shipping Co (1949-51)
- Port of registry: (Weimar Republic) Hamburg (1923-31); (Weimar Republic) Bremerhaven (1931-33); (Nazi Germany) Bremerhaven (1933-45); (United Kingdom) London (1945-47); (India) Bombay (1949-51)
- Builder: Nordseewerke
- Launched: 1926
- Out of service: 10 June 1951
- Identification: Code Letters RFSM (1926-34); Code Letters DHTQ (1934-45); Code Letters GFQV (1945-47); United Kingdom Official Number 180781 (1945-49)
- Fate: Wrecked

General characteristics
- Type: Cargo ship
- Tonnage: 998 GRT; 560 NRT
- Length: 219 ft 6 in (66.90 m)
- Beam: 34 ft 9 in (10.59 m)
- Depth: 13 ft 1 in (3.99 m)
- Installed power: Triple expansion steam engine
- Propulsion: Screw propeller

Quersee was a 999 GRT coaster that was built in 1926 as Amrum by Nordseewerke, Emden for German owners. She was sold in 1931, and renamed Quersee. She was seized by the Allies in May 1945 at Brunsbüttel, Germany, passed to the Ministry of War Transport (MoWT), and renamed Empire Condor. She was sold into merchant service in 1947, and renamed Mediterranean Trader. In 1949, she was sold to India and renamed Maharashmi, serving until 1951, when she ran aground and was wrecked.

== Description ==
The ship was built in 1926 by Nordseewerke, Emden.

The ship was 219 feet 6 inches (66.90 m) long, with a beam of 34 feet 9 inches (10.59 m) a depth of 13 feet 1 inch (3.99 m). She had a GRT of 998 and a NRT of 560.

The ship was propelled by a triple expansion steam engine, which had cylinders of 17 11/16 inches (44.9 cm), 29 1/2 inches (75 cm) and 46 inches (120 cm) diameter by 31 3/5 inches (80 cm) stroke. The engine was built by F Wilhelms-Hütte, Mülheim an der Ruhr.

== History ==
Amrum was built for Schröder, Hölken & Fischer, Hamburg. The Code Letters RFSM were allocated. In 1931, she was sold to W Schuchmann, Bremerhaven and was renamed Quersee. A Seebeck Patent rudder was installed in 1932 by Seebeckwerft, Bremerhaven. In 1934, her Code Letters were changed to DHTQ. On 4 September 1932, Quersee was involved in a collision with the Norwegian steamship Jelo in the Kaiser Wilhelm Canal. Jelo suffered more damage than Quersee.

In May 1945, Quersee was seized by the Allies at Brunsbüttel. She was passed to the MoWT and renamed Empire Condor. Her port of registry was changed to London. The Code Letters GFQV and United Kingdom Official Number 180781 were allocated. She was operated under the management of Hull & Chicken Ltd.

In 1946, Empire Condor was sold to Akritas Navigation Co Ltd, London. In 1947, she was renamed Mediterranean Trader. In 1949, she was sold to South East Shipping Co, Bombay, India and was renamed Maharashmi. On 10 June 1951, she ran aground near the Bhaktal Fort Lighthouse, India and broke into three sections. The ship was a total loss.
