= SS Ilse L M Russ =

1926 German cargo ship

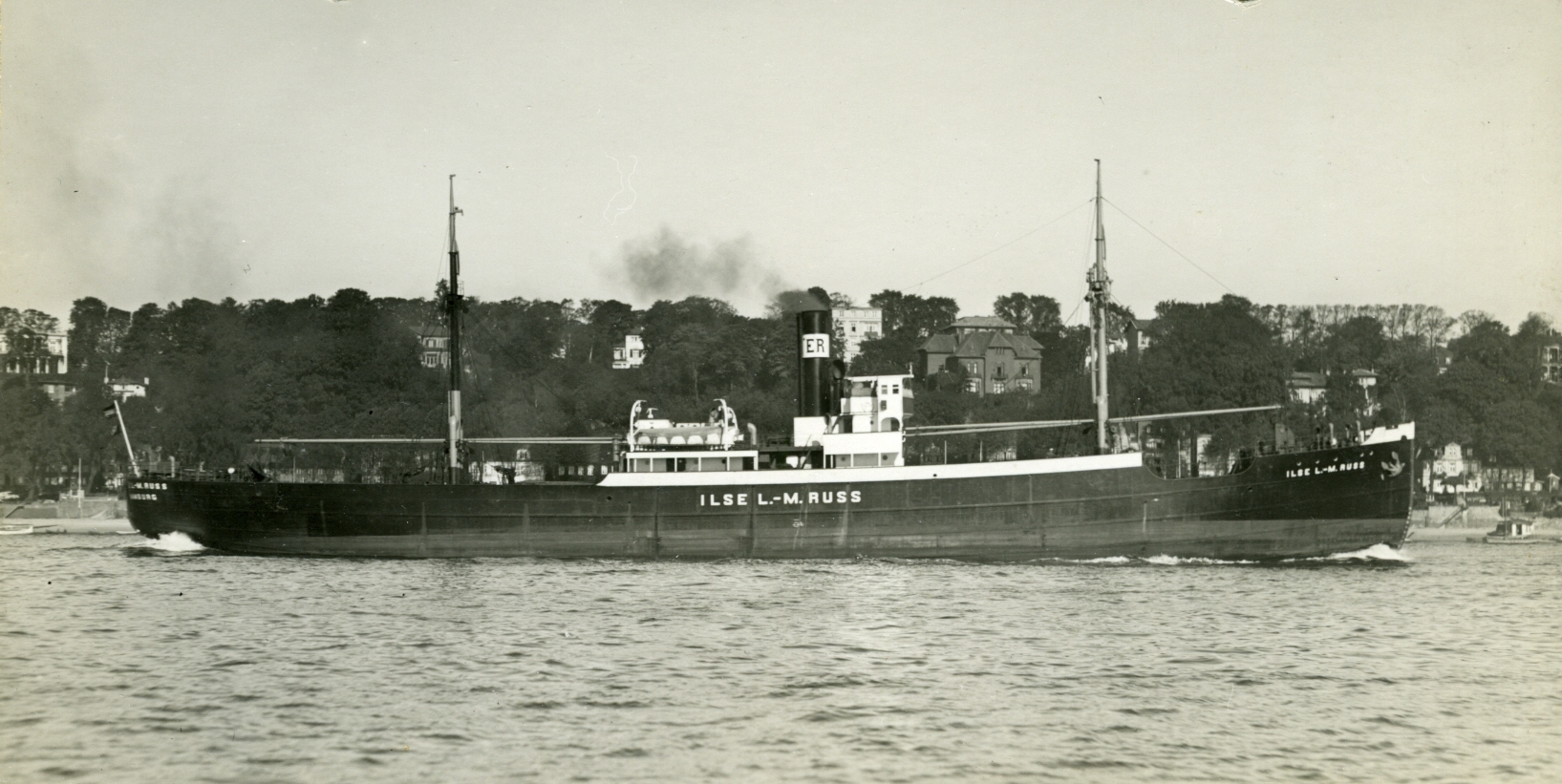
- Ilse L.-M. Russ

History
- Name: Ilse L.-M. Russ (1926–45); Empire Conqueror (1945–46); Ekornes (1946–47); Elfrida (1947–59)
- Owner: Schiffarts und Assekuranz GmbH (1926–45); Wm S Scott & Co Ltd (1945–46); Norwegian Government (1946–47); Tetlies Rederi AS (1947–59)
- Operator: Ernst Russ (1926–45); Ministry of War Transport (1945); Ministry of Transport (1945–46); Norwegian Government (1946–47); Bjarne Tetlie (1947–59)
- Port of registry: (Weimar Republic) Hamburg (1926–33); (Nazi Germany) Hamburg (1933–45); (United Kingdom) London (1945–46); (Norway) Oslo (1946–47); (Norway) Trondheim (1947–59)
- Builder: Flensburger Schiffbau Gesellschaft
- Yard number: 403
- Launched: 1926
- Completed: August 1926
- Out of service: 9 December 1959
- Identification: Code Letters RFVK (1926–34); Code Letters DHMI (1946–53); Code Letters GMXN (1945–46); Code Letters LLTS (1946–59); United Kingdom Official Number 180700 (1945–46)
- Fate: Sank

General characteristics
- Type: Cargo ship
- Tonnage: 1,600 GRT; 942 NRT; 2,600 DWT
- Length: 263 ft 1 in (80.19 m)
- Beam: 41 ft 9 in (12.73 m)
- Depth: 18 ft 6 in (5.64 m)
- Installed power: Triple expansion steam engine
- Propulsion: Screw propeller
- Speed: 9 knots (17 km/h)
- Crew: 20

Ilse L.-M. Russ was a 1,600 GRT cargo ship that was built in 1926 by Flensburger Schiffbau Gesellschaft, Flensburg. She was seized by the Allies in May 1945 at Kiel, passed to the Ministry of War Transport (MoWT) and renamed Empire Conqueror. In 1946, she was allocated to the Norwegian Government and renamed Ekornes. She was sold into merchant service in 1947 and renamed Elfrida. She served until December 1959 when she sprang a leak and sank off the coast of Norway.

== Description ==
The ship was built as yard number 403 by Flensberger Schiffbau Gesellschaft, Flensburg. She was launched in 1926, with completion in August of that year.

The ship was 236 feet 2 inches (71.98 m) long, with a beam of 41 feet 9 inches (12.73 m) and a depth of 15 feet 5 inches (4.70 m). The ship had a GRT of 1,600 and a NRT of 942. She had a DWT of 2,600.

The ship was propelled by a triple expansion steam engine, which had cylinders of 17 1/4 inches (44 cm), 29 1/2 inches (75 cm) and 48 inches (120 cm) diameter by 37 3/4 inches (96 cm) stroke. The engine was built by Flensburger Schiffau Gesellschaft. It could propel her at 9 knots (17 km/h; 10 mph).

== History ==
Ilse L.-M. Russ was built in 1926 for Schiffart und Assekuranz GmbH. She was operated under the management of Ernst Russ, Hamburg. She was allocated the Code Letters RFVK. In 1934, her code letters were changed to DHMI. In 1936, Ilse L.-M. Russ was one of 20 ships chartered to transport timber from Leningrad, Soviet Union to Germany. In 1940, Ilse L.-M. Russ was one of the ships that was to have taken part in Operation Herbstreise.

In May 1945, Ilse L.-M. Russ was seized by the Allies at Kiel. She was passed to the MoWT and renamed Empire Conqueror. She was placed under the management of William S Scott & Co Ltd. Her port of registry was changed to London. The Code Letters GMXN and United Kingdom Official Number 180700 were allocated.

In 1946, Empire Conqueror was transferred to the Norwegian Government and was renamed Ekornes. Her port of registry was changed to Oslo and the Code Letter LLTS were allocated. In 1947, she was sold to Tetlies Rederi AS, Trondheim and renamed Elfrida. She was operated under the management of Bjarne Tetlie. On 8 December 1959, Elfrida was on a voyage from Arkhangelsk, Soviet Union to a Danish port with a cargo of timber, when a leak developed in the engine room. The weather at the time was stormy. A distress call was issued when the ship was at 58°09′N 03°30′E. The ship was discovered capsized with the loss of all 20 crew. She sank on 9 December some 100 nautical miles (190 km) off Stavanger.
