= Walter Hirrlinger =

German politician (1926–2018)

Walter Hirrlinger (24 June 1926, in Tübingen – 24 July 2018, in Esslingen am Neckar) was a German politician and honorary president of the charity organisation Sozialverband VdK Deutschland.

== Early career ==
Hirrlinger completed a commercial apprenticeship, but was drafted for military service and on 2 January 1945 was so badly wounded that he had to sit in a wheelchair for five years. After the war, he worked as a journalist and writer of short stories and novels, before he worked full time for the then VdK – Verband der Kriegsbeschädigten, Kriegshinterbliebenen und Sozialrentner Deutschlands e. V. (Sozialverbands VdK Deutschland since 1994).

== Political Offices ==
From 1953 to 1968, Hirrlinger was a member of the municipal council of Esslingen am Neckar, from 1959 to 1989, he was also on the county council of the district of Esslingen. In December 1960, he moved instead of Gotthilf Schenkel as a member of the state parliament of Baden-Württemberg. After the state elections of 1964 and 1968, he was again a deputy. From 1966 to 1968 he held the chairmanship of the SPD faction. From 1964 to 1968, he was also Deputy State Chairman of the SPD Baden-Württemberg; until 1975 he remained a member of the state executive committee. In the grand coalition under Prime Minister Hans Filbinger, Hirrlinger was from 1968 to 1972 Minister of Labor and Social Affairs.

After his ministerial work, he became managing director of the housing association Neue Heimat Baden-Württemberg (New Home Baden-Württemberg). He held this office until 1986.

In addition to his work at Neue Heimat Hirrlinger 1974-1994 also chairman of the Regional Association Mittlerer Neckar (now Stuttgart region) and from 1972 to 1992 deputy chairman of the VdK-Landesverband Baden-Württemberg. Until 1982 he was a member of the Federal Council of the Social Association, then the Bureau. In 1990 he became the successor of Karl Weishäupl President of the VdK Germany. He held this office until 30 September 2008. His successor was Ulrike Mascher. The news magazine Der Spiegel described Walter Hirrlinger as the "chief lobbyist of German pensioners".

== Personal life ==
Walter Hirrlinger was married to Lore Hirrlinger and father of a mentally handicapped daughter, who died in 2005 at the age of 45 years. Hirrlinger died after a serious illness in July 2018 at the age of 92 years in Esslingen.

== Awards and offices ==
Since its founding in 1979, Hirrlinger has been President of the European Action for the Disabled. From 2000 to 2004 he was chairman of the board of the German Disability Council.

Hirrlinger was since 1978 winner of the Medal of Merit of the State of Baden-Württemberg. He was awarded the Grand Cross of Merit (1979) and the Grand Cross of Merit with Star (1984) of the Order of Merit of the Federal Republic of Germany. In 2004, Hirrlinger was honorary chairman of the VdK Baden-Württemberg.
