= SS I P Suhr =

German cargo ship

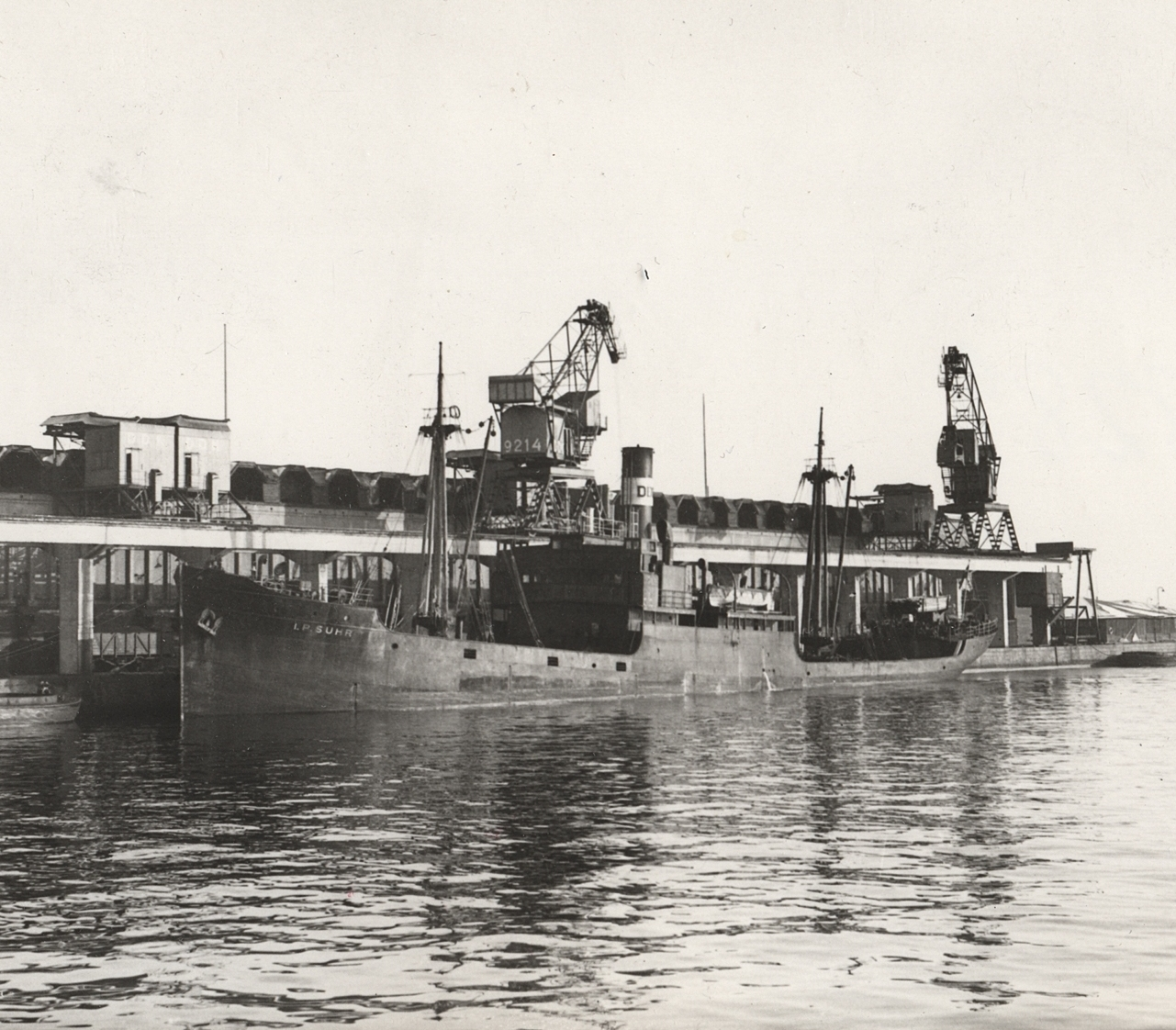
- I.P. Suhr

History
- Name: Siegmund (1926-29); Thielbeck (1929-39); Ingrid Traber (1939-45); Empire Condover (1945-46); Fornes (1946-48); I.P. Suhr (1948-52)
- Owner: Emil R Retzlaff (1926-26); Knohr & Buchard (1929-39); Traber & Co (1939-45); Ministry of War Transport (1945); Ministry of Transport (1945-46); Norwegian Government (1946-48); AS Det Danske Kulkompagni (1948-50)
- Operator: Emil R Retzlaff (1926-26); Knohr& Buchard (1929-39); Traber & Co (1939-45); E R Newbigin Ltd (1945-46); Norwegian Government (1946-48); A Møller & N Westergaard (1948-50)
- Port of registry: (Weimar Republic) Stettin (1926-26); (Weimar Republic) Hamburg (1929-33); (Nazi Germany) Hamburg (1933-45); United Kingdom (1945-46); (Norway) Oslo (1946-48); (Denmark) København (1948-50)
- Builder: Ostseewerft AG,
- Launched: 1926
- Out of service: 1 December 1950
- Identification: Code Letters JBNG (1927-34); Code Letters DHXP (1934-45); Code Letters GMWZ (1945-46); Code Letters OYFJ (1948-50); United Kingdom Official Number 180720 (1945-46)
- Fate: Wrecked

General characteristics
- Type: Cargo ship
- Tonnage: 1,883 GRT (1926-48); 1,999 GRT (1948-50); 1,084 NRT (1926-48); 1,132 NRT (1948-50); 2,820 DWT (1948-50)
- Length: 266 ft 9 in (81.31 m)
- Beam: 41 ft 1 in (12.52 m)
- Depth: 18 ft 6 in (5.64 m)
- Installed power: Compound steam engine
- Propulsion: Screw propeller
- Crew: 21 (I.P. Suhr)

I.P. Suhr was a 1,649 GRT cargo ship that was built in 1926 by Ostseewerft AG, Stettin as Siegmund for German owners. After a sale in 1929 she was renamed Thielbek. A further sale in 1939 saw her renamed Ingrid Traber. She was seized by the Allies in May 1945, passed to the Ministry of War Transport (MoWT) and renamed Empire Condover. In 1946, she was passed to the Norwegian Government and renamed Fornes. She was sold into merchant service in 1948 and renamed I.P. Suhr, serving until December 1950 when she capsized and sank.

== Description ==
The ship was launched on 18 Dezember 1926 at Ostseewerft AG, Stettin, completed in March 1927 and put into service on 21 March 1927.

The ship was 266 feet 9 inches (81.31 m) long, with a beam of 41 feet 1 inch (12.52 m) a depth of 18 feet 6 inches (5.64 m). She had a GRT of 1,883. and a NRT of 1,084.

The ship was propelled by a compound steam engine which had two cylinders of 16 1/2 inches (42 cm) and two cylinders of 35 7/16 inches (90.0 cm) diameter by 35 7/16 inches (90.0 cm) stroke. The engine was built by Ostsee Werft.

== History ==
Siegmund was built for Emil R. Retzlaff, Stettin. She was sold in 1929 to Knohr & Burchard, Hamburg and renamed Thielbek. The Code Letters JBNG were allocated. On 9 December 1934, Thielbek ran aground at Befanaes, Denmark. She was later refloated and arrived at Kiel, Schleswig-Holstein, Germany on 16 December.

In 1934, her Code Letters were changed to DHXP. In 1939, she was sold to Traber & Co, Hamburg and renamed Ingrid Traber. This change was not recorded by Lloyds Register, she continued to be listed as Thielbek. Ingrid Traber was a member of a convoy which departed Hamburg on 6 March 1942 bound for Norway. On 1 May 1945, Ingrid Traber was in collision with the Hamburg-Südamerikanische Dampfschiffahrts-Gesellschaft steamship Brunhilde.

In May 1945, Ingrid Traber was seized by the Allies. She was passed to the MoWT and renamed Empire Condover. Her port of registry was changed to London. The United Kingdom Official Number 180720 and Code Letters GMWZ were allocated. She was placed under the management of E R Newbigin Ltd. In 1946, she was allocated to the Norwegian Government and renamed Fornes. In 1948, she was sold to Aktieselskabet Det Danske Kulkompagni and renamed I.P. Suhr. Her port of registry was København and the Code Letters OYFJ were allocated. She was placed under the management of A Møller and N Westergaard. I.P. Suhr was recorded as 1,999 GRT, 1,132 NRT, 2,820 DWT. On 1 December 1950, I.P. Suhr was on a voyage from Gdańsk, Poland to Aarhus, Denmark when she capsized and sank 5 nautical miles (9.3 km) off Sandhammaren, Sweden with the loss of 20 of her 21 crew. The wreck was blown up in 1952 and salvaged as scrap.
