= 1920 in Germany =

- Decades: 1900s; 1910s; 1920s; 1930s; 1940s
- See also: Other events of 1920; History of Germany • Timeline • Years

Events in the year 1920 in Germany.

== Incumbents ==
=== National level ===
- President - Friedrich Ebert (Social Democrats)
- Chancellor - Gustav Bauer (Social Democrats) (to 26 March), Hermann Müller (Social Democrats) (to 21 June), Constantin Fehrenbach (Centre) (from 25 June)

== Overview ==
The Treaty of Versailles in the previous year resulted in Germany losing several provinces. The most important changes were the loss of Alsace-Lorraine to France and of a large stretch of territory in West Prussia, Posen, and Upper Silesia to Poland. The territory ceded to Poland amounted to nearly 20,000 square miles (50,000 km^{2}), and, coupled with the establishment of Danzig as an independent state, which was also imposed upon Germany, this had the effect of cutting off East Prussia from the main territory of Germany.

Danzig and Memel were to be ceded to the Allies, their fate to be subsequently decided. A portion of Silesia was to be ceded to Czechoslovakia. The treaty also provided for plebiscites to be held in certain areas to decide their destinies. Certain districts of East Prussia and West Prussia were to be polled to decide whether they should belong to Germany or to Poland. A third portion of Silesia, which was in dispute between Germany and Poland, was to exercise the right of self-determination. The small districts of Eupen and Malmedy were to decide whether they would belong to Belgium or to Germany. The middle and southern districts of the province of Schleswig, which had been annexed to Prussia in 1866, were to decide their own destinies. Finally, the coal-producing valley of the Saarland, which had been provisionally separated from Germany, was to be the subject of a referendum after the lapse of fifteen years.

Cut with the Kitchen Knife Dada Through the Last Weimar Beer-Belly Cultural Epoch in Germany is an example of photomontage by Dada artist Hannah Höch. She is considered a progenitor of the subversive art style

Raoul Hausmann, George Grosz, Hannah Höch and other artists helped establish the Berlin wing of the Dada movement, an avant garde artistic movement that defied the established forms of classical art. Photomontage, a technique Hausmann claims to have originated with Höch in 1918, becomes associated with Berlin Dada style.

== Events ==
=== Internal territorial changes in Germany ===
After the revolution, Alsace-Lorraine was returned to France, and the two principalities of Reuss united into a single state. The Duchy of Saxe-Coburg-Gotha split apart; Coburg voluntarily united with Bavaria, and Saxe-Gotha entered into negotiations with a number of the other small states of central Germany to bring about a general union of the little republics concerned. Six states took part in the negotiations: Schwarzburg-Rudolstadt, Schwarzburg-Sondershausen, Reuss, Saxe-Gotha, Saxe-Weimar-Eisenach, Saxe-Meiningen and Saxe-Altenburg. The new State of Thuringia was formed on 1 May 1920 with Weimar as its capital.The total population of Thuringia was just over 1,600,000, and its area was just over 4,500 square miles (11,700 km^{2}).

=== Political situation at the beginning of the year ===
From the time of the revolution until the end of 1919, the Liberal and Radical parties in combination with the so-called Majority Social Democratic Party had held power continuously, and were confirmed in their position by the general election held in January 1919. The results were similar to those for the old Reichstag in the time of the Empire.

In March, following months of instability, the president asked Hermann Müller, who had previously held the office of minister for foreign affairs, to form an administration. Within forty-eight hours it was announced that Müller had succeeded in forming a cabinet, which included (as did the previous administration) members of all the three moderate parties, the Catholic Centre Party, the Democrats, and the Majority Social Democrats. The new cabinet was composed as follows:

Chancellor and Minister for Foreign Affairs	Hermann Müller
Undersecretary for Foreign Affairs	von Haniel
Minister of the Interior and Vice-Chancellor	Erich Koch-Weser
Minister of Posts	Johannes Giesberts
Minister of Finance	Joseph Wirth
Minister of Transport	Johannes Bell
Minister of Justice	Andreas Blunck
Minister of Labour	Alexander Schlicke
Minister of Economics	Robert Schmidt
Minister of Defense	Otto Gessler
Minister of Food	Andreas Hermes
Minister without Portfolio	Eduard David
President of the Treasury	Gustav Bauer

Müller's tenure of the Foreign Office was only temporary, and before the middle of April he relinquished that position to Dr. Adolf Köster.

=== Ruhr uprising ===
As soon as he assumed office Müller had to deal with insurrection in the Ruhr valley and the neutral zone generally. The German government applied to the Allies for permission to send troops into the disturbed districts in excess of the numbers allowed by the Treaty of Versailles. The British and Italian governments made various suggestions for a temporary modification of certain provisions of the Treaty of Versailles (Articles 42 to 44). The French government, however, declared that if the Germans were allowed to send forces into the Ruhr District, the French should be allowed to occupy Frankfurt, Homburg, and other neighbouring German towns during the period that the German troops were in the neutral zone. The German government rejected the French suggestion of a parallel occupation. On 3 April, German regular troops of the Reichswehr, under General Oskar von Watter, entered the neutral zone in force, and experienced little difficulty in dealing with the armed leftist workers. The revolutionary headquarters at Mülheim were taken on April 4. Immediately after the German troops crossed the line, the French government itself gave orders to its own troops to advance, proclaiming the necessity of this move on the grounds that Articles 42 to 44 of the Treaty of Versailles had been broken by the Germans. The population of Frankfurt was hostile, and the British government regarded the advance as an extreme measure which should only have been adopted in the last resort. The British held that the enforcement of the terms of the Treaty of Versailles was an affair for the Allies collectively, and not for any single Allied government.

Müller complained of French militarism, and in particular that Senegalese negro troops should have been quartered in Frankfurt University. He blamed Kapp and his associates for the fact that the working classes had now lost confidence in the republican army. In the disturbed area, 160 German officers and men had been killed and nearly 400 had been wounded.

The San Remo conference, a meeting of the Supreme Council, consisting of the British, French, and Italian prime ministers, was opened on 19 April; it dealt, among other questions, with the German invasion of the Ruhr Valley, and with the problem of disarmament. David Lloyd George, with the support of Francesco Saverio Nitti, proposed that the German government should be invited to attend the conference; but this was opposed by Alexandre Millerand. The result of the discussions at San Remo on the German question was that a note dealing with the question of disarmament was sent to the German government at the end of April, stating that it was impossible for the Allied governments even to consider the German request for an increase in troop allowances whilst Germany failed to fulfil its obligations under the Treaty of Versailles. The rapidity with which the Reichswehr overcame the insurgents made it possible for the German government to withdraw the troops quickly. At the end of April the foreign minister, Adolf Köster, declared that the French ought now to evacuate Frankfurt, Darmstadt, and Homburg, because the German troops had been reduced to 17,500. The Allied side stated that the force must be reduced forthwith to twenty battalions, six squadrons, and two batteries; and that even this force would have to be replaced entirely by a body of 10,000 police by July 10. The German government made the necessary reductions, and on May 17 the French evacuated Frankfurt and the other occupied towns.

=== General election and new government ===
The German government arranged a general election for Sunday, 6 June, and about 80% of the voters exercised their rights. The three moderate parties, which had been in an overwhelming majority both in the last imperial Reichstag and also in the new republican National Assembly, were returned with a much smaller majority over the right and left political wings combined. The Communists enteredthe contest, and a rout of the Spartacists, who won only two seats, was tempered by the success of the Independent Social Democrat, one of the most extreme Socialist parties in Europe, who increased their membership of the house from 22 to 80. This success was gained at the expense of the Majority Social Democrats, previously the largest party in the National Assembly.

After several politicians had attempted in vain to form a new cabinet, Constantin Fehrenbach, one of the most respected leaders of the Centre Party, succeeded in doing so. The German People's Party, led by Gustav Stresemann, agreed to unite with the Centre and Democrats to form a government. The Majority Social Democrats would not join a ministry which included the German People's Party, but agreed to lend the new government their general support in the Reichstag. Fehrenbach had entered the Bavarian parliament as a Catholic and a representative of Freiburg, and in 1919 he became president of the National Assembly.Rudolf Heinze became vice-chancellor and minister for justice, Dr. Walter Simons became foreign minister, Joseph Wirth became minister of finance, Erich Koch-Weser was minister of the interior, and Johannes Giesberts was minister of posts. Former defence minister Gustav Noske was not a member of the new cabinet.

=== Spa conference ===
At the meeting of the Supreme Council at San Remo in April it was decided to invite the German government to a conference at Spa, in Belgium, in order to settle the questions relating to disarmament and reparations which arose under the terms of the Treaty of Versailles. The Spa Conference was held during the first half of July, and Fehrenbach himself attended the conference at which Lloyd George and Millerand were also present. Before going into the conference with the Germans the Allies agreed amongst themselves as to the proportions of the total German reparation which should be allotted to each of the Allied countries. Thus France was to receive 52%, the British Empire 22%, Italy 10%, Belgium 8%, and Serbia 5%, the small remaining proportion to be divided amongst other claimants. Apart from her 8% Belgium was to have the privilege of transferring her entire war debt to Germany's shoulders, and she was also to have a prior claim upon the first £100,000,000 paid by Germany. These proportions were settled, but the total amount to be paid by Germany was not decided.

The conference was to have been opened on July 5, and a preliminary sitting was in fact held on that day, but owing to the non-arrival of Otto Gessler, the German minister of defense, it was not possible to proceed with the serious consideration of the first subject on the agenda, which was the question of German disarmament. The conference was held under the presidency of the Belgian prime minister, Léon Delacroix, and the Belgian foreign minister, Paul Hymans, also attended. The British representatives, in addition to Lloyd George himself, were Lord Curzon and Sir Laming Worthington-Evans. The chief Italian representative was Count Sforza, the distinguished and successful foreign minister. The German chancellor was accompanied by Simons and Wirth.

On the following day Gessler arrived, and he proceeded at once to make a formal request that the 100,000 men, which was the limit of the German army allowed by the treaty, should continue to be exceeded, on the ground that it was impossible for the government to keep order with such a small force. Lloyd George then explained the reasons for the Allies' anxiety. He said that the treaty allowed Germany 100,000 men, 100,000 rifles, and 2,000 machine guns. Germany, however, still possessed a regular army of 200,000 men, and also possessed 50,000 machine guns, and 12,000 guns. Moreover, she had only surrendered 1,500,000 rifles, although it was obvious that there must be millions of rifles in the country. During the discussions on the following days it transpired from statements made by the chief of the General Staff himself, General von Seeckt, that in addition to the Reichswehr there were various other organized forces in Germany such as the Einwohnerwehr and the Sicherheitspolizei. The Einwohnerwehr alone appear to have numbered over 500,000 men. General von Seeckt proposed that the regular army should be reduced gradually to 100,000 men by October 1921. A discussion upon this matter took place between the Allies, and it was decided that Germany should be given until January 1, 1921, to reduce the strength of the Reichswehr to the treaty figure of 100,000 men. The exact conditions laid down were that Germany should reduce the Reichswehr to 150,000 men by October 1, withdraw the arms of the Einwohnerwehr and the Sicherheitspolizei, and issue a proclamation demanding the surrender of all arms in the hands of the civilian population, with effective penalties in the event of default. On July 9 the German delegates signed the agreement embodying these stipulations in regard to disarmament.

The later sittings of the conference were concerned with the question of the trial of the German "war criminals", the delivery of coal as a form of reparation, and various other financial matters. It was the question of coal which required the closest attention, largely owing to the extreme need of France for supplies of coal, and the agreement relating to this matter was signed on July 16. It was decided that for six months after August 1 the German government should deliver up 2,000,000 tons of coal per month.

The question of the war criminals referred to above had been under discussion since the beginning of the year. The Treaty of Versailles had required that certain persons with an especially evil record in the war should be handed over to the Allies. Lists of the chief persons coming under the heading of "war criminals" were published by the Allied governments at the end of January. The lists included a number of very well known persons, such as the Crown Prince Rupprecht of Bavaria, Field Marshal August von Mackensen, General von Kluck, Admiral von Tirpitz, and Admiral von Capelle. However, the ex-Emperor Wilhelm had fled to the Netherlands, and since the Dutch government definitely declined to hand him over to the Allies, it was generally held, especially in Britain, that it was difficult to press forward very vigorously with the punishment of those who, however important their positions, had only been the emperor's servants. It was therefore subsequently decided that the German government itself should be instructed to proceed with the punishment of the war criminals concerned. But it transpired at Spa that the German government had been extremely dilatory in taking the necessary proceedings.

=== Rest of 1920 ===
The last five months of the year were much less eventful in Germany. The country was still suffering from a shortage of food, though not in the acute degree which was so painfully characteristic of Austria and also of some of the other countries farther east. The German government appears to have made serious efforts to comply with their treaty obligations regarding disarmament and reparation. Thus, in the three weeks following the Spa Conference over 4,000 heavy guns and field guns were destroyed; and measures were taken to obtain the very large number of arms which existed all over the country in the hands of the civilian population. Great numbers of livestock were also handed over to the Allies. Thus France received from Germany (up to November 30) over 30,000 horses, over 65,000 cattle, and over 100,000 sheep. Belgium received, up to the same date, 6,000 horses, 67,000 cattle, and 35,000 sheep.

The financial position of the country remained extremely serious. The total national debt (funded debt and floating debt) amounted to 200,000,000,000 marks, that is, £10,000,000,000 sterling at the old prewar rate of exchange. The anticipated revenue for the year 1920–21 was 27,950,000,000 marks, and the anticipated ordinary expenditure was 23,800,000,000 marks. There was, however, also an anticipated extraordinary expenditure of no less than 11,600,000,000 marks. A heavy deficit on the railways was also expected. The exchange value of the mark had fallen disastrously since the armistice, and though it rose towards the end of the year, the mark was still reckoned at over 200 to the pound sterling in December.

Various statistics of population were published during the year. Among other significant features, it was stated that the number of children under five years of age, in the whole of the territories of the former Hohenzollern empire, had sunk from 8,000,000 in 1911 to 5,000,000 in 1919.

== Events ==
- January – The new state of Thuringia, formed by a union of six smaller states, comes into existence.
- 20 January – The provisions of the Treaty of Versailles come into force, restricting the German army to a maximum of 100,000 men.
- 28 February – Minister of Defence Gustav Noske dissolves the Freikorps Marinebrigaden "Ehrhardt" and "Loewenfeld", but the highest ranking general of the Reichswehr, Walther von Lüttwitz, refuses to comply.
- 13 March – Kapp Putsch: Wolfgang Kapp and Walther von Lüttwitz attempt to overthrow the Weimar Republic and establish an autocratic government in its place.
- 19 March – Spartacist risings occur in many different places, especially in western Prussia, Bavaria, Württemberg, and Leipzig.
- 27 March
  - Gustav Bauer resigns as Chancellor and is replaced by Hermann Müller.
  - Otto Braun becomes premier of Prussia, with a new ministry constituted on much the same lines as that of Germany, including members of all the three moderate parties.
- 4 April – The Ruhr uprising comes to a violent end.
- 6 April – French occupation of Frankfurt: French troops occupy parts of the neutral zone in response to Germany's failure to observe the terms of the Treaty of Versailles.
- 25 April – The San Remo conference decides that so long as the German government does not carry out the disarmament clauses of the Treaty of Versailles, the Allied governments will not consider the German request that 100,000-man limit on the permanent force allowed by the treaty should be increased.
- 6 June – 1920 German federal election
- 28 June – The new chancellor, Constantin Fehrenbach, tells the Reichstag on June 28 that, so long as the formerly hostile states refuse to modify the Treaty of Versailles, the German government must endeavour to the best of their ability to observe the terms of the treaty.

== Births ==
- 3 January - Siegfried Buback, Attorney General of Germany (died 1977)
- 9 January - Curth Flatow, German dramatist and screenwriter (died 2011)
- 23 January - Gottfried Böhm, German architect and sculptor (died 2021)
- 26 January - Heinz Kessler, German politician, military officer and convicted felon (died 2017)
- 8 February - Karin Himboldt, German actress (died 2005)
- 20 February – Karl Albrecht, German entrepreneur (died 2014)
- 22 February – Maria Hellwig, German yodeler, popular performer of volkstümliche Musik (Alpine folk music), and television presenter (died 2010)
- 2 March - Heinz-Ludwig Schmidt, footballer and manager (died 2008)
- 22 March – Helmut Winschermann, German oboist (died 2021)
- 15 April – Richard von Weizsäcker, German politician, former President of Germany (died 2015)
- 2 June – Marcel Reich-Ranicki, German literary critic (died 2013)
- 18 June – Utta Danella, German writer (died 2015)
- 5 July - Rosemarie Springer, German equestrian (died 2019)
- 22 August - Wolfdietrich Schnurre, German writer (died 1989)
- 7 October - Georg Leber, German politician (died 2012)
- 8 October - Maxi Herber, German figure skater (died 2006)
- 8 October - Maria Beig, German author (died 2018)
- 31 October - Fritz Walter, German football player (died 2002)
- 17 November - Ellis Kaut, German author of children's literature, best known for her creation of Pumuckl (died 2015)
- 18 December - Rita Streich, German opera singer (died 1987)
- 19 December - Alfred Dregger, German politician (died 2002)

== Deaths ==
- 31 March - Lothar von Trotha, German military commander (born 1848)
- 12 May – Casar Flaischlen, German poet (born 1864)
- 14 June – Max Weber, German sociologist, philosopher, jurist, and political economist (born 1864)
- 18 July - Albert Zürner, German diver (born 1890)
- 18 July - Prince Joachim of Prussia, German nobleman (born 1890)
- 27 July - Thomas Nörber, German bishop of Roman Catholic Church (born 1846)
- 6 August - Remus von Woyrsch, German fieldmarshall (born 1847)
- 12 August - Hermann Struve, German-Russian astronomer (born 1854)
- 31 August - Wilhelm Wundt, German physician (born 1832)
- 8 September - Rudolf Mosse, German newspaper magnate (born 1843)
- 2 October - Max Bruch, German composer (born 1838)
