= 1921 in Germany =

- Decades: 1900s; 1910s; 1920s; 1930s; 1940s
- See also: Other events of 1921; History of Germany • Timeline • Years

Events in the year 1921 in Germany.

== Incumbents ==
=== National level ===
- President - Friedrich Ebert (Social Democrats)
- Chancellor - Constantin Fehrenbach (Centre) (to 10 May), Joseph Wirth (Centre) (from 10 May)

== Overview ==
Almost all of the most important events in Germany in 1921 were connected with questions arising out of the provisions of the Treaty of Versailles, disarmament, reparations, trials of war criminals, and the plebiscite in Upper Silesia—questions that, from their harassing nature, kept both government and people in constant suspense and agitation.

== Troubles complying with the Treaty of Versailles ==
=== Disarmament ===
The Protocol of Spa had threatened Germany with new sanctions in the form of further occupation of German territory if Germany did not continue on its schedule of war reparations. But the threat was suspended, and the matter of disarmament was referred to a conference of ministers at Paris at the end of January. This conference not only drew up a plan for Germany's reparation obligations, but also fixed eight dates for the fulfilment of all disarmament demands. The most important of these dates were for the delivery of the remaining war material (February 28), the repeal of a new Reichswehr law, with the absolute abolition of conscription for the Reich and the single states (March 15), the surrender of all heavy and of two-thirds of the small firearms belonging to the organizations for self-protection (March 31), the disarmament of all ships in reserve (April 30), the complete disbandment of all organizations of defense and the surrender of the remainder of their arms (June 30), and lastly (July 31), the destruction of warships in the process of construction, with the exception of those transformed with the assent of the Allies into mercantile vessels.

=== War reparations ===
The Paris conference of ministers, which commenced on January 24, formulated a plan by which Germany was to pay 226,000 million Goldmarks in forty-two fixed annuities from May 1, 1921, to May 1, 1963, aing annuities each equal to 12% of German exports. This plan was communicated to the German government, along with the announcement that in case of non-fulfilment sanctions in the terms of the Spa Protocol would be applied.

This communication of the Paris conference caused intense agitation in Germany. Speaking in the Reichstag the foreign minister, Walter Simons, characterized the Paris demands as impossible to fulfill, as an infringement of the Treaty of Versailles, and as involving the economic enslavement captures of the German people. He declared in the name of the government that the proposed plan could not be regarded as a basis for further negotiations. With the exception of the Communist Party, the leaders of the parliamentary groups endorsed the declaration of the government.

Through the chairman of the Paris conference, the German government were invited to send a representative on March 1 to London, to discuss the reparation question. The government accepted the invitation, but smarting from their experiences at Versailles and Spa, the German government wanted to make sure that their views would be well represented.

The German delegates had a difficult time putting effective counterproposals together due to their philosophical differences, so all of the proposals were ultimately rejected. In a later sitting British Prime Minister David Lloyd George informed the German delegates that their proposals would not meet with serious consideration. In addition, he allowed them a fixed time to agree with the substance of the decision of the Paris conference. If they failed to agree, George threatened Germany with Allied reoccupation of Duisburg, Ruhrort, and Düsseldorf, the raising of tribute from the sale price of German goods in the Allied countries, and the erection of a customs frontier on the Rhine, under the supervision of the Allies.

The government protested to the League of Nations, but without effect. The military occupation of the three cities mentioned took place immediately, and was extended to other places as well, while the special customs frontier on the Rhine was drawn on two dates, April 20 and May 10. On each occasion protests were made from the German side, which received no more attention than those that preceded them. On the other hand, the action of the Reparations Commission in fixing further dates for the payment of enormous sums by Germany was scarcely noticed, public attention being almost wholly centred on the approach of May 1, the date assigned for the first payment of reparations.

Simultaneously the President of the German Reich Friedrich Ebert issued a proclamation, countersigned by the chancellor, Constantin Fehrenbach, to the effect that the Allies had occupied areas of Germany in defiance to the Treaty of Versailles and that they would not object to outside help in the matter.

=== Occupied Rhineland ===
In the occupied territories of the Rhineland, the edicts of the occupation authorities, especially the French, led to many conflicts between them and the German administration. The German commissioner, von Stark, who had several times protested against decrees of the Inter-Allied Rhineland Commission, was threatened with expulsion by the president of the commission, and to avoid this he resigned voluntarily. His successor, the Prince of Hatzfeld-Wildenburg, was only admitted after long negotiations, and on condition that he promised to abstain from all obstruction and to cooperate loyally with the Rhineland Commission. Complaints, however, of arbitrary decisions of the commission have continued to abound, especially in regard to the execution of justice and the administration of schools. Up to March 31, the cost of the occupation to Germany was 4 milliards of Goldmark and 7 milliards of Papiermark (paper mark).

=== Trials of war criminals ===
Along with the questions of disarmament and reparation, punishment of German war criminals was a matter that kept Germany in continual anxiety and unrest. The government attempted to fulfill the war crime obligations it had agreed to. Nine of these trials took place before the Supreme Court, from May 23 onwards. Several cases ended in an acquittal of the accused, but most were followed by imprisonment or incarceration in a fortress. A British delegation headed by the solicitor-general, Sir Ernest Pollock, attended the first trials, in which cases brought on the demand of the United Kingdom were heard. The other trials were similarly attended by a French or Belgian delegation. The acquittal of General Karl Stenger, who was accused by the French of having had French prisoners shot, caused the French government to recall its legal mission and the French witnesses.

=== Upper Silesia plebiscite ===
The clause of the Treaty of Versailles demanding a plebiscite in Upper Silesia was next taken in hand. The German government had already declared during the negotiations in London that the possession of Upper Silesia was indispensable to Germany if she was to fulfill her obligations in regard to reparations. After some negotiation the plebiscite was fixed for March 20, and resulted in 717,122 votes being cast for Germany against 483,514 for Poland, the result very different from the last 1910 census, where Poles had clear 60% majority.

With the results of the Plebiscite making the ultimate fate of Upper Silesia unclear, fighting erupted in the province between insurgent Polish forces and German militias. The Germanophone section of the population made strong complaints, being firmly convinced that the French division of the Upper Silesian army of occupation was favouring the insurrection by refusing to do anything.

Twelve days after the start of the uprising, Wojciech Korfanty offered to take his Upper Silesian forces behind a line of demarcation, on condition that the released territory would not be occupied by German forces, but by Allied troops. It was not, however, until July 1 that the British troops arrived in Upper Silesia and began to advance in company with those of the Allies towards the former frontier. Simultaneously with this advance the Inter-Allied Commission pronounced a general amnesty for the illegal actions committed during the recent violence, with the exception of acts of revenge and cruelty. The German defense force was finally withdrawn and disbanded and quiet was restored.

As the Supreme Council was unable to come to an agreement on the partition of the Upper Silesian territory on the lines of the plebiscite, a solution was found by turning the question over to the Council of the League of Nations. Agreements between the Germans and Poles in Upper Silesia and appeals issued by both sides, as well as the despatch of six battalions of Allied troops and the disbandment of the local guards, contributed markedly to the pacification of the district. On the basis of the reports of a League of Nations commission and those of its experts, the Council awarded the greater part of the Upper Silesian industrial district to Poland. Poland obtained almost exactly half of the 1,950,000 inhabitants, viz., 965,000, but not quite a third of the territory, i.e., only 3,214.26 km^{2} (1,255 mi^{2}) out of 10,950.89 km^{2} (4,265 mi^{2}).

German and Polish officials, under a League of Nations recommendation, agreed to come up with protections of minority interests that would last for 15 years. Special measures were threatened in case either of the two states should refuse to participate in the drawing up of such regulations, or to accept them subsequently.

Polish Government had decided to give Upper Silesia considerable Autonomy with Silesian Parliament as a constituency and Silesian Voivodship Council as the executive body.

== Politics ==
=== Resignation of Fehrenbach government ===
In the middle of all of these troubles with the Treaty of Versailles the cabinet of Chancellor Constantin Fehrenbach resigned on May 10. In the meantime the Reparations Commission had fixed the sum of Germany's debt at 132 milliard Goldmark, besides having stated that by May 1, when the German debt became due, a further sum of 12 milliard Goldmark for reconstruction of demolished industrial works was to be paid. As a kind of guarantee, the commission demanded that the gold treasure of the Reichsbank and of certain other banking-houses should be transported to the occupied territory. Before these claims could be met, they were replaced by the ultimatum of the Allied governments, which gave the German government until May 12, under threat of occupation of the Ruhr valley, to declare that they had decided unreservedly to fulfil the obligations drawn up by the commission, to accept all of its dictated guarantees, to carry out immediately and without reserve the measures prescribed in regard to disarmament, and, finally, to proceed without delay to try the war criminals.

=== Joseph Wirth's first government ===
After many days of trying negotiations, which at times made it seem it would be impossible to form any German government whatsoever, the Minister of Finance of the preceding government, Dr. Joseph Wirth, managed to form a coalition cabinet willing to accept the ultimatum as it stood (May 10). Members of the Centre, Majority Socialist, and Social Democratic parties constituted the greater part of this new cabinet, in which three vacancies were left temporarily, the other appointments being as follows:

- Dr. Joseph Wirth (Centre Party) – Reich chancellor and minister of finance
- Gustav Bauer (Social Democratic (SPD)) – vice-chancellor and Minister of the Reich treasury
- Friedrich Rosen, Minister of Foreign Affairs
- Dr. Georg Gradnauer (SPD) – Minister of the Interior
- Robert Schmidt (SPD), Minister of Economics
- Dr. Heinrich Brauns (Centre) – Minister of Labour
- Dr. Eugen Schiffer (SPD) – Minister of Justice
- Dr. Otto Gessler (SPD) – Minister of Defense
- Wilhelm Groener – Minister of Transportation
- Johannes Giesberts (Centre) – Minister of the Post
- Dr. Andreas Hermes (Centre) – Minister of Food
- Walther Rathenau (Democrat) – Minister of Reconstruction

The three middle parties of the Reichstag, who desired a genuine democracy, supported the new cabinet. The German People's Party also was willing on certain conditions to join the coalition and to sign the ultimatum. In the end, the majority was composed of the Centre Party, the Social Democrats, Independent Social Democrats, and certain members of the People's Party.

A certain lull in the storm over the reparations question took place during the following months. The first gold milliard had been paid on August 31, and only the 33 1/3% fall in the value of the mark, which later depreciated to a still greater degree, indicated approaching peril. Although no further doubt was cast on Germany's will to pay, the Allies failed to repeal the military sanctions of March 9. The trade sanctions came to an end on September 30, but not without a burdensome commission of contract having been instituted in their place.

In order to further Germany's work of reconstruction in the north of France, the two ministers, Walther Rathenau and Louis Loucheur, conferred several times at Wiesbaden in August and September, in regard to the delivery by Germany of the necessary material. Germany agreed to deliveries that were to be credited as payment, but were not to exceed the value of 7 milliard Goldmark by May 1, 1926.

The growing sense that the Reich would never be able to meet their reparation obligations led to bankers using private foreign credit at the disposal of the Reich. The reparation payments discharged in this manner were to be credited to industry for taxes, to amounts to be stated at a later date. This plan was well received at first. But certain tendencies that subsequently manifested themselves among the great industrials led to failure of this push to use foreign credit. To meet its debt, the German government had also tried to negotiate a loan with a foreign banking-house of £25,000,000, and had been rebuffed with a pertinent reference to the reparation burden. Thereupon the government declared to the Reparations Commission in December that the two following instalments, due on January 15 and February 15, of 500,000,000 Goldmark and about 250,000,000 Goldmark respectively, could only be paid in part, and a delay was requested. Thus at the end of the year the problem of reparations had again become acute.

=== Joseph Wirth's second government ===
After the official publication of this decision, Chancellor Wirth, considering that his task had been rendered impossible, resigned with the whole of his cabinet. After vain attempts to reorganize the cabinet on a broader basis by including members of the German People's Party, the president of the republic again entrusted Wirth with the formation of the cabinet, a task he soon accomplished (October 26). Wirth's 2nd cabinet included:

- Wirth (Centre) – chancellor and acting minister of foreign affairs
- Bauer (SPD) – Vice-chancellor and Minister of the treasury
- Adolf Köster (SPD) – minister of the interior
- Dr. Heinrich Brauns (Centre) – Minister of Labour
- Dr. Andreas Hermes (Centre) – Minister of Food Supply and Agriculture, and Acting Minister of Finance,
- Dr. Otto Gessler (DDP) – Minister of defense
- Wilhelm Groener – Minister of Transport and Communication
- Johannes Giesberts (Centre) – Minister of Post
- Robert Schmidt (SPD) – Minister of Economy
- Dr. Gustav Radbruch (SPD) – Minister of Justice

A vote of confidence in the new government was passed by 230 votes to 132, the minority consisting of the two parties of the right and the Communists.

== State of German finances ==
Sharp criticism was levelled in Parliament and in the press against the extreme slowness with which long overdue taxes were being collected. The slowness in tax collection was partly attributable to the overworked condition of revenue and taxation officials. The sensational drop in the value of the mark due to inflation in the Weimar Republic made the financial position still more deplorable, and produced at the end of the year an unprecedented rise in prices. It also led to a positive inundation of the large western towns with buyers from the countries with high exchange. This resulted in Germany being drained of goods without receiving a fair equivalent. The stimulus given to trade and industry, though it certainly reduced unemployment to a minimum, was no compensation, because the export of manufactures involved a continual decrease of German assets. Eventually, all of these factors would lead to the mark being devalued to as little as 4.2×10^{12} mark to the United States dollar.

== Communist rising and right-wing violence ==
In March, there was a Communist rising in central Germany, accompanied by violence, murder, and pillage. Max Hoelz, the leader of the insurrection was captured and tried before a special court in Berlin, which sentenced him to imprisonment for life and loss of civic rights. The rest of those involved in the insurrection were also tried by special courts and condemned to imprisonment for varying periods. A large proportion of those who took a subordinate part in the insurrection were amnestied.

On the other hand, the supporters of a royalist and military system, including 40,000 ex-officers of the old army as well as a relatively large number of landowners, higher officials, and the middle classes in the towns, did not openly rise against the republic. However, their insults to the new black, red, and gold German flag and bitter attacks on the representatives of the republic in the press and in public speeches became more frequent. Two political murders that appeared to be a product of this spirit showed that the political temperature had risen. In June, Karl Gareis, the leader of the local Independent Socialist Party, was murdered at Munich, and on August 25 Matthias Erzberger, the former minister of finance, was murdered.

The murderer of Gareis could not be found, but it was widely taken for granted that the murder was a political act. Erzberger's murderers were identified as two young men, apparently nationalist fanatics.

Both murders, especially that of Erzberger, created an extremely bitter feeling among the working classes. Public demonstrations were held in favour of the republic, and both Socialist parties took steps to draw the attention of the chancellor to the dangers of the situation, and to demand energetic measures against those who had organized the agitation and who were to be considered morally responsible for the recent crimes.

On August 29, the president issued a decree, based on Article 48 of the German constitution, authorizing an anti-sedition act that would last for at least 14 days. The decree inspired opposition on all sides, and it was repealed on December 24 by a vote of the Reichstag after being in force barely four months.

== Foreign affairs ==
Some important agreements and treaties with foreign states were concluded during the year. On May 6 an economic agreement was concluded with the Russian Soviet Republic, and a German delegation under Professor Kurt Wiedenfeld was sent to Moscow. Peace with the United States was signed in Berlin on August 25, and was ratified by the German Reichstag on September 30 and by the American Senate on October 19. A treaty with China, proclaiming a state of peace between the two countries, was made on May 20. A treaty was concluded with Switzerland on December 3, which set up a court of arbitration to deal with disputes between the two countries. A series of economic treaties with Czechoslovakia, Italy, and the Kingdom of Serbs, Croats and Slovenes must be added, as well as a treaty of preference with Portugal. An agreement with the United Kingdom concerning the partial restoration of German private property was concluded on January 12.

Plebiscites in Austrian Tyrol and Salzburg in 1921, saw majorities of 98.77% and 99.11% voted for a unification with Germany.

== Births ==
- 19 January – Rachel Dror, German teacher and Holocaust survivor (died 2024)
- 21 January – Andreas Ostler, bobsledder (died 1988)
- 5 February – Ken Adam, English production designer (died 2016)
- 8 February – Hans Albert, German philosopher (died 2023)
- 17 February – Herbert Köfer, actor and news anchor in East Germany who continued his career on TV after Germany's reunification (died 2021)
- 2 March – Wilhelm Büsing, German equestrian (died 2023)
- 27 April – Hans-Joachim Kulenkampff, German television presenter (died 1998)
- 9 May – Sophie Scholl, German White Rose resistance member (died 1943)
- 10 May – Oliver Hassencamp, German actor and writer (died (died 1988)
- 11 May – Hildegard Hamm-Brücher, German politician (died 2016)
- 12 May – Joseph Beuys, German artist, teacher and activist (died 1986)
- 14 May – Mordechai Breuer, Israeli biblical scholar and author (died 2007)
- 20 May – Wolfgang Borchert, German writer (d. 1947)
- 23 May – Beate Albrecht, German violinist and music educator (died 2017)
- 24 May – Gertraud Gruber, beautician and businesswoman (died 2022)
- 25 May – Jack Steinberger, German-born physicist, Nobel Prize laureate (died 2020)
- 26 May – Inge Borkh, soprano (died 2018)
- 28 May – Heinz G. Konsalik, German author (died 1999)
- 10 June – Oskar Gröning, German SS officer and war criminal (died 2018)
- 12 June – Heinz Weiss, German actor (died 2010)
- 12 September – Yvonne-Ruth Killmer, German journalist (died 2014)
- 5 November – Margot Friedländer, German Holocaust survivor and public speaker (died 2025)
- 8 November – Peter Spoden, German night fighter ace (died 2021)

== Deaths ==
- 1 January – Theobald von Bethmann Hollweg, politician, Chancellor of Germany (born 1856)
- 18 January – Adolf von Hildebrand, German sculptor (born 1847)
- 23 January – Heinrich Wilhelm Gottfried von Waldeyer-Hartz, German anatomist (born 1836)
- 11 April – Augusta Victoria of Schleswig-Holstein, the former Empress of Germany (born 1858)
- 13 April – Theodor Leutwein, colonial administrator (born 1849)
- 18 April – August Scherl, German newspaper magnate (born 1849)
- 4 June – Ludwig Knorr, German chemist (born 1859)
- 29 June –Otto Seeck, German classical historian (born 1850)
- 26 August
  - Matthias Erzberger, writer and politician (born 1875; murdered)
  - Ludwig Thoma, German writer (born 1867)
- 31 August – Karl von Bülow, German field marshal (born 1846)
- 17 September – Philipp, Prince of Eulenburg, German diplomat (born 1847)
- 2 October – William II, the former king of Württemberg (born 1848)
- 18 October – Ludwig III, the former king of Bavaria (born 1845)
- 8 November – Charles, 6th Prince of Lowenstein-Wertheim-Rosenberg, German nobleman (born 1834)
- 30 November – Hermann Schwarz, mathematician (born 1843)
- 13 December – Max Noether, German mathematician (born 1844)
- 20 December – Julius Richard Petri, German microbiologist (born 1852)
