= 1862 in Germany =

- Decades: 1840s; 1850s; 1860s; 1870s; 1880s
- See also: Other events of 1862; History of Germany • Timeline • Years

Events from the year 1862 in Germany.

== Incumbents ==
- King of Bavaria – Maximilian II of Bavaria
- King of Saxony – John
- King of Hanover – George V
- King of Prussia – William I
- King of Württemberg – William I of Württemberg
- Grand Duke of Baden – Frederick I

== Events ==
- 9 August – Theater Baden-Baden opens with Béatrice et Bénédict.
- 21 September – Deutscher Sängerbund is founded.
- 30 September – Otto von Bismarck gives the speech named Blood and Iron in Berlin.

=== Undated ===
- Landesmuseum Württemberg is opened.

== Births ==
- 1 January – Heinrich Braun, German surgeon (died 1934)
- 6 January – August Oetker, German businessman (died 1918)
- 9 January – Agnes Bluhm, German physician (died 1943)
- 20 January – Karl von Tubeuf, German forestry scientist, mycologist and plant pathologist (died 1941)
- 23 January – David Hilbert, German mathematician (died 1943)
- 24 January – Prince Alfons of Bavaria, German nobleman (died 1933)
- 6 February – Joseph Friedrich Nicolaus Bornmüller, German botanist (died 1946)
- 22 February – Philipp von Hellingrath, German general (died 1939)
- 13 March – Wilhelm Weigand, German poet and writer (died 1949)
- 11 April – Heinrich Cunow, German politician (died 1936)
- 28 May – Theodor Fischer, German architect (died 1938)
- 7 June – Philipp Lenard, German physicist and the winner of the Nobel Prize for Physics in 1905 (died 1947)
- 12 June – Wilhelm Meyer-Förster, German novelist (died 1934)
- 18 June – Otto Immisch, German philologist (died 1936)
- 12 August – Martin Brendel, German astronomer (died 1939)
- 14 August – Prince Henry of Prussia, German Prussian prince (died 1929)
- 16 August – Ludwig Hermann Plate, German zoologist (died 1937)
- 20 August – Paul Stäckel, German mathematician (died 1919)
- 26 August – Theodor Siebs, German linguist (died 1941)
- 11 September – Augustin Henninghaus, German Roman Catholic missionary (died 1939)
- 15 September – Friedrich von Lindequist, German gouverneur of German South#West Africa (died 1945)
- 2 October – Karl Ebermaier, German governeur of Kamerun (died 1943)
- 4 October – Sebastian Finsterwalder, German mathematician (died 1951)
- 15 October – Conrad Ansorge, German composer and pianist (died 1930)
- 14 November – Johann Heinrich von Bernstorff, German diplomat and ambassador (died 1939)
- 15 November – Gerhart Hauptmann, German writer, Nobel Prize laureate (died 1946)
- 29 November – Friedrich Klose, German composer (died 1942)
- 14 December – Gunther von Etzel, German general (died 1948)

== Deaths ==
- 2 February – Rudolph Suhrlandt, German painter (born 1781)
- 15 February – Heinrich Adam, German painter (born 1787)
- 3 March – Princess Augusta Reuss of Köstritz, German Grand Duchess of Mecklenburg-Schwerin (born 1822)
- 19 March – Friedrich Wilhelm Schadow, German painter (born 1789)
- 15 July – Henriette Hanke, German writer (born 1785)
- 28 August – Albrecht Adam, German painter (born 1786)
- 12 November – Christian Gottlob Barth, German theologian (born 1799)
