= 1919 in Germany =

- Decades: 1890s; 1900s; 1910s; 1920s; 1930s
- See also: Other events of 1919; History of Germany • Timeline • Years

Event activities in the year 1919 in Germany.

== Incumbents ==
=== National level ===
- President - vacant, Friedrich Ebert (Social Democrats) (from 11 February)
- Chancellor - Friedrich Ebert (Social Democrats) ("Head of Government") (to 11 February), Philipp Scheidemann (Social Democrats) (to 20 June), Gustav Bauer (Social Democrats) (from 21 June)

== Events ==
- 5–15 January – Spartacist uprising
- 19 January – German federal election, 1919
- 11 February - German presidential election, 1919
- 13 February – Scheidemann cabinet are sworn in.
- 29 March – University of Hamburg is established.
- 21 June – Bauer cabinet are sworn in.
- 28 June – The Weimar Republic is forced to sign the Treaty of Versailles under threat of continued Allied advance, which effectively ended World War I.
- 12 September – Adolf Hitler spies on the German's Worker Party meeting in 1919 for the Reichswehr, also joining the party.

=== Undated ===
- Betz's law is published in 1919, by the German physicist Albert Betz. It indicates the maximum power that can be extracted from the wind, independent of the design of a wind turbine in open flow.
- Forbo Movement Systems, a manufacturer of conveyor and power transmission belts is founded.
- Münchener Lichtspielkunst AG is founded in Munich.

== Births ==
- 29 January – Konrad Hesse, German judge (died 2005)
- 6 March – Michael Karkoc, German war criminal (died 2019)
- 27 March – Peter Selz, German-born art historian (died 2019)
- 3 March – Loki Schmidt, German environmentalist, wife of Helmut Schmidt (died 2010)
- 6 April – Heinz Schimmelpfennig, German actor (died 2010)
- 23 April – Anne Buydens, Belgian-American actress (died 2021)
- 3 May – Traute Lafrenz, German-American physician and anthropologist (died 2023)
- 16 May – Albert Osswald, German politician (died 1996)
- 19 June - Anneliese Rothenberger, German operatic soprano (died 2010)
- 7 July – Hans Adolph Buchdahl, German-born Australian physicist (died 2010)
- 8 July – Walter Scheel, German politician (died 2016)
- 29 July – Kunigunde Bachl, German physician and politician (died 1994)
- 31 August – Eric Koch, German-Canadian author, broadcaster and academic (died 2018)
- 30 August – Wolfgang Wagner, German opera director (died 2010)
- 5 September – Elisabeth Volkenrath, German Nazi concentration camp supervisor (died 1945)
- 22 September – Franz Peter Wirth, German film director (died 1999)
- 29 September – Margot Hielscher, German actress and singer (died 2017)
- 3 October – Hella Brock, German musicologist (died 2020)
- 7 October – Annemarie Renger, German politician (died 2008)
- 6 November – Christoph Probst, German resistance fighter and Catholic martyr (died 1943)
- 9 November – John Herberger, German football player and coach (died 2002)
- 10 November – Kurt Schmücker, German politician (died 1996)
- 14 November – Lisa Otto, German soprano (died 2013)
- 30 November – Detlef Kraus, German pianist (died 2008)
- 31 December – Artur Fischer, German inventor (died 2016)

== Deaths ==
- 4 January – Georg von Hertling, German politician, Chancellor of Germany (born 1843)
- 15 January – Rosa Luxemburg, German politician (born 1871)
- 15 January – Karl Liebknecht, German politician (born 1871)
- 26 January – Hermann von Bönninghausen, German athlete and World War I veteran (born 1888)
- 28 January – Franz Mehring, German politician (born 1846)
- 21 February:
  - Kurt Eisner, German journalist and theatre critic (born 1867)
  - Louis Tuaillon, German sculptor (born 1862)
- 24 March – Franz Metzner, German sculptor (born 1870)
- 25 March – Wilhelm Lehmbruck, German sculptor (born 1881)
- 28 May – Friedrich Sigmund Merkel German anatomist and histopathologist (born 1845)
- 7 June – Henning von Holtzendorff, German admiral (born 1853)
- 2 July – Friedrich Soennecken, German entrepreneur and inventor (born 1848)
- 15 July – Hermann Emil Fischer, German chemist (born 1852)
- 19 July – Walter Brack, German swimmer (born 1880)
- 2 August:
  - Christoph Blumhardt, German theologian (born 1842)
  - Otto Kissenberth, German World War I flying ace (born 1893)
  - Johann von Dallwitz, German politician (born 1855)
- 9 August – Ernst Haeckel, German biologist, naturalist, philosopher and physician (born 1834)
- 24 August – Friedrich Naumann, German politician (born 1860)
- 1 October – Princess Charlotte of Prussia, Prussian princess (born 1860)
- 7 November – Hugo Haase, German politician (born 1863)
- 11 November – Felix von Hartmann, German bishop of Roman-Catholic Church (born 1851)
- 29 November – Fritz Schaper, German sculptor (born 1841)
