= 1848 in Germany =

- Decades: 1820s; 1830s; 1840s; 1850s; 1860s
- See also: Other events of 1848; History of Germany • Timeline • Years

Events from the year 1848 in Germany.

== Incumbents ==
- King of Bavaria – Ludwig I. (until 20 March 1848); Maximilian II (since 20 March 1848)
- King of Hanover – Ernest Augustus
- King of Prussia – Frederick William IV
- King of Saxony – Frederick Augustus II

== Events ==
- 17 March - Poem In Kümmernis und Dunkelheit was written in London by German poet Ferdinand Freiligrath.
- February - Publication of The Communist Manifesto
- April - Hecker uprising in Baden
- 9 April - Battle of Bov
- 9 April - Foundation of Münchner Neueste Nachrichten
- 20 April - Battle on the Scheideck
- 23 April - Battle of Schleswig
- 23 April - Battle of Mysunde
- 24 April - Skirmish of Oversø
- 1 May - 1848 German federal election
- 7 May - Start of magazine Kladderadatsch
- 11 May - Baden mutiny
- 18 May - 379 deputies assembled in the Kaisersaal in Frankfurt am Main walked solemnly to the Paulskirche to hold the first session of the German national assembly, under its chairman (by seniority) Friedrich Lang. Heinrich von Gagern became first elected president of Frankfurt Parliament.
- 1 June - Foundation of Neue Rheinische Zeitung
- 24 June - President of the National Assembly Heinrich von Gagern argued for a regency and provisional central government to carry out parliamentary decisions.
- 25 June - Forming of Casino faction in Frankfurt Parliament: Factions in the Frankfurt Assembly
- 21 September - Struve Putsch: Proclamation of the German Republic by Gustav Struve in Lörrach
- 21 October - Würzburg Bishops' Conference
- 5 December - Promulgation of the Constitution of Prussia (1848)

=== Undated ===
- Forty-Eighters
- German revolutions of 1848–1849
- Baden Revolution
- Foundation of Piusverein
- Painting Gnome Watching Railway Train by Carl Spitzweg
- Painting Germania (St. Paul's Church, Frankfurt am Main)
- Opera Regina by German composer Albert Lortzing

== Births ==
- 10 January - Paul Tschackert, German Protestant theologian (died 1911)
- 12 January - Franz von Soxhlet, German agricultural chemist (died 1926)
- 2 February - Ludwig Dill, German painter (died 1940)
- 4 February - Hermann von Hatzfeldt, German nobleman and politician (died 1933)
- 5 February - Louis Schmeisser, German weapon technical designer (died 1917)
- 6 February - Wilhelm von Finck, German banker and entrepreneur (died 1924)
- 7 February - Adolf Weil, German physician (died 1916)
- 13 February – Hermann von Eichhorn, German field marshal (died 1918)
- 25 February – King William II of Württemberg (died 1921)
- 3 March - Gustav Fischer, German explorer (died 1886)
- 27 April – King Otto of Bavaria (died 1916)
- 23 May - Otto Lilienthal, German engineer, aviation pioneer (died 1896)
- 23 May - Helmuth von Moltke the Younger, German general (died 1916)
- 3 July – Lothar von Trotha, German military commander (died 1920)
- 22 July - Adolphus Frederick V, Grand Duke of Mecklenburg-Strelitz (died 1914)
- 7 September - Berta Behrens, German novelist (died 1912)
- 8 September – Viktor Meyer, German chemist (died 1897)
- 18 September - Maximilian Nitze, German urologist (died 1916)
- 20 September – Friedrich Soennecken, German entrepreneur, inventor of the hole punch and ringbinder (died 1919)
- 8 November – Gottlob Frege, German logician (died 1925)
- 23 November - Habbo Gerhard Lolling, German archaeologist (died 1894)
- 27 November – Maximilian von Prittwitz, German general (died 1917)
- 22 December - Ulrich von Wilamowitz-Moellendorff, German classical philologist (died 1931)

== Deaths ==
- 9 January – Caroline Herschel, German astronomer (born 1750)
- 22 January - Karl Gottlieb Bretschneider, German Protestant scholar and theologian (born 1776)
- 15 February – Hermann von Boyen, Prussian field marshal (born 1771)
- 22 February – Wilhelmine Reichard, first German woman balloonist (born 1788)
- 24 May – Annette von Droste-Hülshoff, German writer (born 1797)
- 10 July – Karoline Jagemann, German actress (born 1777)
- 18 September - Hans Adolf Erdmann von Auerswald, Prussian general (born 1792)
- 9 November – Robert Blum, German politician (born 1810)
- 28 November - Duchess Amelia of Württemberg, German noblewoman (born 1799)
- 16 December - Bruno Erhard Abegg, German politician and statesman (born 1803)
- 31 December - Johann Gottfried Jakob Hermann, German philologist (born 1772)
- undated - Ludwig Leichhardt, German explorer in Australia (born 1813)
