= 1918 in Germany =

- Decades: 1890s; 1900s; 1910s; 1920s; 1930s
- See also: Other events of 1918; History of Germany • Timeline • Years

The following is a list of events of the year 1918 in Germany.

1918 saw the continuation of World War I into its fourth year, already causing massive strain to the German home front. In late January, strikes across German cities saw armament workers walk off the job for a week. As consequence, the Imperial Government arrested strike organisers. With the withdrawal of Soviet Russia from the war in March, the German army began preparing for a massive offensive on the Western Front. The Spring Offensive, however, failed. The war deteriorated in September for the Central Powers with the withdrawal of Bulgaria, forcing Germany's military leaders - Erich Ludendorff and Paul von Hindenburg - to accept Germany's defeat and convince Kaiser Wilhelm II to begin seeking peace. A liberal government headed by Prince Maximilian of Baden was appointed in October.

In late October and early November, a mutiny by sailors in Kiel caused the spread of Workers' and Soldiers' Councils across Germany. Power was handed over the Social Democratic Party (SPD), headed by Friedrich Ebert, who declared Germany a republic on November 9 - bringing an end to the German Empire and German monarchies. On November 11, Germany signed an armistice with the Allies, thereby ending World War I. The last two months of the year were unstable for the new republic, directly leading to the political chaos of 1919.

== Incumbents ==
=== National level ===
==== Head of State ====
- Emperor – Wilhelm II, abdicated 9 November
- Republic (from 9 November) – vacant

==== Head of Government ====
- Chancellor (Imperial) - Georg von Hertling to 30 September, then from 3 October Prince Maximilian of Baden to 9 November
- Republic – from 9 November Friedrich Ebert, "Head of Government"

=== State level ===
Monarchs and Colonial Governors

=== Kings ===
- King of Bavaria – Ludwig III abdicated 7 November
- King of Prussia – Wilhelm II, abdicated 9 November
- King of Saxony – Frederick Augustus III, abdicated 13 November
- King of Württemberg – William II, abdicated 30 November

=== Grand Dukes ===
- Grand Duke of Baden – Frederick II, abdicated 22 November
- Grand Duke of Hesse – Ernest Louis, abdicated 9 November
- Grand Duke of Mecklenburg-Schwerin - Frederick Francis IV, abdicated 14 November
- Grand Duke of Mecklenburg-Strelitz – Adolphus Frederick VI, died 23 November, thereafter vacant
- Grand Duke of Oldenburg – Frederick Augustus II, abdicated 11 November
- Grand Duke of Saxe-Weimar-Eisenach – William Ernest, abdicated 9 November

=== Dukes ===
- Duke of Anhalt – Frederick II, Duke of Anhalt to 21 April, then Eduard, Duke of Anhalt to 13 September, then Joachim Ernst, Duke of Anhalt (with Prince Aribert of Anhalt regent), abdicated 12 November
- Duke of Brunswick – Ernest Augustus, Duke of Brunswick, abdicated 8 November
- Duke of Saxe-Altenburg – Ernst II, Duke of Saxe-Altenburg, abdicated 13 November
- Duke of Saxe-Coburg and Gotha – Charles Edward, Duke of Saxe-Coburg and Gotha, abdicated 14 November
- Duke of Saxe-Meiningen – Bernhard III, Duke of Saxe-Meiningen, abdicated 10 November

=== Princes ===
- Schaumburg-Lippe – Adolf II, Prince of Schaumburg-Lippe, abdicated 15 November
- Schwarzburg-Rudolstadt – Günther Victor, Prince of Schwarzburg, abdicated 22 November
- Schwarzburg-Sondershausen – Günther Victor, Prince of Schwarzburg, abdicated 22 November
- Principality of Lippe – Leopold IV, Prince of Lippe, abdicated 12 November
- Reuss Elder Line – Heinrich XXIV, Prince Reuss of Greiz (with Heinrich XXVII, Prince Reuss Younger Line, as regent), abdicated November
- Reuss Younger Line – Heinrich XXVII, Prince Reuss Younger Line, abdicated November
- Waldeck and Pyrmont – Friedrich, Prince of Waldeck and Pyrmont, abdicated 13 November

=== Colonial Governors ===
- German East Africa (Deutsch-Ostafrika) – Heinrich Schnee to 14 November, although most of territory under Allied occupation.

== Events ==
=== January ===
- 30 January - Armament workers resume work in Bavarian cities except Munich, whose workers went on strike on January 31.

=== February ===
- 1 February - USDP representatives in Bavaria, including Kurt Eisner, are arrested for their involvement in the Januarstreik.
- 3 February - The Action Committee of the Januarstreik terminates the strike ahead of the government's February 4 deadline.
- Date unknown - Arthur Scherbius applies to patent the Enigma machine.

=== September ===
- 29 September - Spa Conference: Ludendorff and Hindenburg agree to begin seeking an armistice with the Allies following Bulgaria's withdrawal from the war.

=== October ===
- Wilhelm II appoints Max von Baden Chancellor of Germany.
- 4 October - Wilhelm II forms a new more liberal government to sue for peace.
- 28 October - Kiel Mutiny: sailors at Kiel mutiny against naval orders to launce a final attack on the British navy. The mutiny's leaders are arrested.

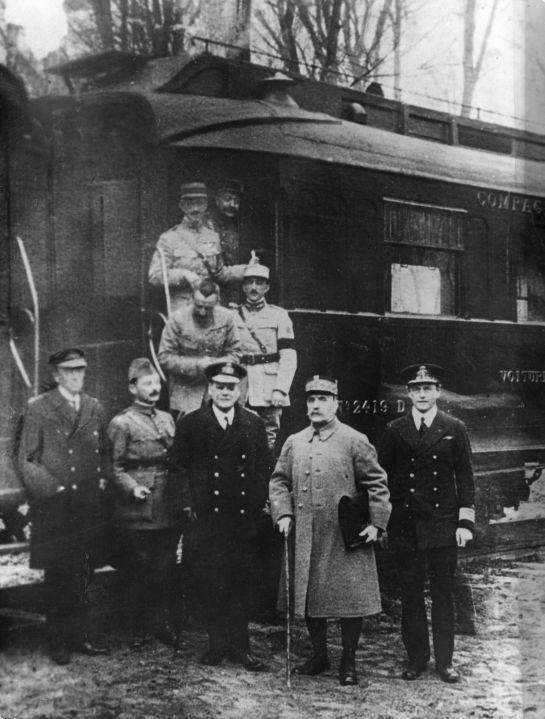
November 11: Signatories to the Armistice with Germany (Compiègne), ending WWI, pose outside Marshal Foch's railway carriage

=== November ===
- 3 November - Protests by Kiel sailors and workers to free arrested mutineers are met violently before the city garrison defects to the demonstrators. Workers' and Soldiers' councils are established, beginning the German Revolution.
- 8 November - The People's State of Bavaria overthrows the Bavarian monarchy.
- 9 November:
  - Wilhelm II is forced to abdicate and flees to the Netherlands
  - Germany is proclaimed a republic by Philipp Scheidemann of the MSPD, and Karl Liebknecht of the Spartacus League.
- 10 November: The Ebert-Groener pact secures the army's support for the new republic in return for Ebert's pledge to prevent Communism from establishing itself in Germany.
- 11 November - End of WWI and Armistice with Germany (Compiègne): Germany signs an armistice agreement with the Allies between 5:12 AM and 5:20 AM in Marshal Foch's railroad car in Compiègne Forest in France. It takes effect at 11:00 AM.

=== December ===
- 28 December - The USDP leaves its coalition with the governing MSPD due to disagreements on how to restructure the army.

== Born ==
- 10 January - Harry Merkel, racing driver (died 1995)
- 1 March - Franz Becker, footballer (died 1965)
- 3 March - Fritz Thiedemann, equestrian (died 2000)
- 20 March - Bernd Alois Zimmermann, composer (died 1970)
- 28 April - Karl-Eduard von Schnitzler, journalist (died 2001)
- 24 May - Katharina Szelinski-Singer, sculptor (died 2010)
- 1 August - Artur Brauner, film producer (died 2019)
- 4 August - Claus Holm, actor (died 1996)
- 22 September – Hans Scholl, White Rose resistance member (died 1943)
- 10 October - Werner Dollinger, politician (died 2008)
- 20 October - Werner Maihofer, jurist and politician (died 2009)
- 26 October - Dietrich von Bothmer, art historian (died 2009)
- 5 November - Gisela Arendt, swimmer (died 1969)
- 8 November - Hermann Zapf, typeface designer and calligrapher (died 2015)
- 10 November – Ernst Otto Fischer, chemist, Nobel Prize in Chemistry (died 2007)
- 23 December – Helmut Schmidt, politician (died 2015)

== Deaths ==
=== January ===
- 6 January – Georg Cantor, mathematician (born 1845)
- 7 January – Julius Wellhausen, biblical scholar (born 1844)
- 9 January – Max Ritter von Müller, World War I fighter ace (killed in action, born 1887)
- 10 January – August Oetker, entrepreneur (born 1862)
- 21 January – Emil Jellinek, automobile entrepreneur (born 1853)

=== February ===
- 23 February – Adolphus Frederick VI, Grand Duke of Mecklenburg-Strelitz, nobleman (born 1882)

=== March ===
- 9 March – Frank Wedekind, playwright (born 1864)
- 10 March
  - Hans-Joachim Buddecke, flying ace (killed in action, born 1890)
  - Eugen von Zimmerer, German prosecutor, attorney and (born 1843)
- 15 March – Adolf Ritter von Tutschek, fighter ace (killed in action, born 1891)
- 17 March – Hans Bethge, World War I flying ace (born 1890)
- 30 March – Richard Beitzen, World War I naval officer (born 1882)

=== April ===
- 4 April – Hermann Cohen, philosopher (born 1842)
- 20 April – Karl Ferdinand Braun, inventor, physicist and Nobel laureate in physics (born 1850)
- 21 April
  - Friedrich II, Duke of Anhalt (born 1856)
  - Manfred von Richthofen, fighter pilot (born 1892)
- 27 April – Oscar Troplowitz, pharmacist and entrepreneur (born 1863)

=== May ===
- 14 May - Max Wilms, surgeon and physician (born 1867)
- 28 May - Richard Assmann, meteorologist and physician (born 1845)

=== June ===
- 24 June - Julius Kollmann, anatomist and zoologist (born 1834)

=== July ===
- 7 July - Arno Bieberstein, swimmer (born 1884)
- 9 July – Hans am Ende, Impressionist painter (born 1864)

=== August ===
- 22 August – Korbinian Brodmann, neurologist and psychiatrist (born 1868)
- 30 August – Wilhelm Kühne, World War I flying ace (born 1888)

=== September ===
- 10 September - Carl Peters, colonial ruler, explorer, politician and author (born 1856)
- 13 September – Eduard, Duke of Anhalt, nobleman (born 1861).
- 23 September - Georg Theodor August Gaffky, bacteriologist (born 1850)
- 28 September - Georg Simmel, philosopher and sociologist (born 1858)

=== October ===
- 9 October - Hanns Braun, athlete (born 1886)
- 18 October – Fritz Otto Brenert, World War I flying ace (born 1893)
- 26 October – Olivier Freiherr von Beaulieu-Marconnay, World War I flying ace (born 1898)

=== November ===
- 4 November - Hans Graf von Schwerin-Löwitz, politician (born 1847)
- 5 November:
  - Wolfgang Zenker, World War I naval officer (born 1898)
  - Bruno Heinemann, World War I naval officer (born 1880)
- 9 November - Albert Ballin, shipping magnate (born 1857)
- 23 November - Fritz von Below, general (born 1853)
- 22 December – Hermann Theodor Simon, physicist (born 1870)
