= 1864 in Germany =

- Decades: 1840s; 1850s; 1860s; 1870s; 1880s
- See also: Other events of 1864; History of Germany • Timeline • Years

Events from the year 1864 in Germany.

== Incumbents ==
- King of Bavaria – Maximilian II of Bavaria; Ludwig II of Bavaria
- King of Prussia – William I
- King of Saxony – John

== Events ==
- 1 February – Beginning of Second Schleswig War
- 2 February – Battle of Mysunde
- 6 February – Battle of Sankelmark
- 17 March – Battle of Jasmund
- 7–18 April – Battle of Dybbøl
- 25 April – 25 June – London Conference of 1864
- 9 May – Battle of Heligoland
- 29 June – 1 July – Battle of Als
- 3 July – Battle of Lundby
- 30 October – Treaty of Vienna, End of Second Schleswig War

=== Undated ===
- Evacuation of Danevirke
- Alfred Enneper publishes his parametrization of the Enneper surface in connection with minimal surface theory
- Hugo Erfurt invents Ingrain wallpaper

== Births ==
- 8 January – Julie Wolfthorn, German painter (died 1944)
- 13 January – Wilhelm Wien, German physicist, Nobel Prize laureate (died 1928)
- 5 February – Carl Teike, German composer (died 1922)
- 16 February – Hermann Stehr, German novelist and writer (died 1940)
- 24 February – Alfred Jeremias, German pastor, assyriologist and an expert on the religions of the Ancient Near East (died 1935)
- 4 March – Johanna Ey, German art dealer (died 1944)
- 30 March – Franz Oppenheimer, German sociologist (died 1943)
- 11 April – Johanna Elberskirchen, German writer and women rights activist (died 1943)
- 21 April – Max Weber, German sociologist (died 1920)
- 5 May – Hans Gerhard Gräf, German Goethe specialist (died 1942)
- 12 May – Cäsar Flaischlen, German poet (died 1920)
- 15 May – Robert Schmidt, German politician (died 1943)
- 21 May – Otfried Nippold, German jurist (died 1938)
- 22 May – Willy Stöwer, German artist and painter (died 1931)
- 2 June – Wilhelm Souchon, German admiral (died 1946)
- 3 June – Albert Fraenkel, German physician (died 1938)
- 11 June – Richard Strauss, German composer (died 1949)
- 14 June – Alois Alzheimer, German psychiatrist, neuropathologist (died 1915)
- 16 June – Willy Wolterstorff, German paleontologist and herpetologist (died 1943)
- 22 June – Hermann Minkowski, German mathematician (died 1909), born in Russia
- 25 June – Walther Nernst, German chemist, Nobel Prize laureate (died 1941)
- 18 July – Ricarda Huch, German historian and writer (died 1947)
- 24 July – Frank Wedekind, German playwright (died 1918)
- 12 August – Kuno von Westarp, German politician (died 1945)
- 17 August – Paul Wendland, German philologist (died 1915)
- 20 August – Karl Fritz, German Roman Catholic archbishop (died 1931)
- 27 August – Hermann Weingärtner, German gymnast (died 1919)
- 19 September – Carl Correns, German biologist (died 1933)
- 26 September – Arthur Kampf, German painter (died 1950)
- 5 October – Arthur Zimmermann, German diplomat (died 1945)
- 30 October – Theodor Wiegand, German archaeologist (died 1936)
- 27 November – Alfred Meyer-Waldeck, German admiral (died 1928), born in Russia
- 31 December – Hans am Ende, German painter (died 1918)

== Deaths ==
- 27 January – Leo von Klenze, German neoclassicist architect, painter and writer (born 1784)
- 10 March – Maximilian II of Bavaria, German king of Bavaria (born 1811)
- 2 May – Giacomo Meyerbeer, German composer (born 1791), died in France
- 3 August – Jakob Walter, German stonemason, common draftee (born 1788)
