= 1844 in Germany =

- Decades: 1820s; 1830s; 1840s; 1850s; 1860s
- See also: Other events of 1844; History of Germany • Timeline • Years

Events in the year 1844 in Germany.

== Incumbents ==
- King of Bavaria – Ludwig I
- King of Hanover – Ernest Augustus
- King of Prussia – Frederick William IV
- King of Saxony – Frederick Augustus II
- King of Württemberg – William I of Württemberg
- Grand Duke of Baden – Leopold, Grand Duke of Baden

== Events ==
- 15 March – opening of Gößnitz station

=== Undated ===
- Rabbinical Conference of Brunswick

== Establishments ==
- Freiburger Turnerschaft von 1844
- Roemer- und Pelizaeus-Museum Hildesheim
- Waggonfabrik Fuchs

== Births ==
- 3 January – Hermann Eggert, German architect (died 1920)
- 16 January – Paul Singer, German politician (died 1911)
- 14 February – Joseph Thyssen, German industrialist (died 1915)
- 10 March – Karl Gutbrod, German judge (died 1905)
- 25 March – Adolf Engler, German botanist (died 1930)
- 3 April – Georg Ratzinger, priest and politician (died 1899)
- 30 April – Carl von Thieme, German banker (died 1924)
- 17 May – Julius Wellhausen, biblical scholar (died 1918)
- 6 August – Alfred, Duke of Saxe-Coburg and Gotha (died 1900)
- 30 August – Friedrich Ratzel, German geographer and ethnographer (died 1904)
- 13 September – Ludwig von Falkenhausen, German general (died 1936)
- 15 October – Friedrich Nietzsche, German philosopher, cultural critic, composer, poet, philologist (died 1900)
- 24 November – Friedrich Jolly, neurologist (died 1904)
- 25 November – Carl Benz, German engine designer and automobile engineer (died 1929)

== Deaths ==
- 8 March – Theresia Anna Maria von Brühl, pastellist (born 1784)
- 11 May – Georg Ludwig Engelhard Krebs, apothecary and natural history collector (born 1792)
- 16 May – Joseph Knauer, Bishop of Wroclaw (born 1764)
- 4 August – Christian Friedrich Illgen, Protestant theologian (born 1786)
