= 1916 in Germany =

- Decades: 1890s; 1900s; 1910s; 1920s; 1930s
- See also: Other events of 1916; History of Germany • Timeline • Years

Events in the year 1916 in Germany.

== Incumbents ==
=== National level ===
- Emperor – Wilhelm II
- Chancellor – Theobald von Bethmann Hollweg

=== State level ===
==== Kingdoms ====
- King of Bavaria – Ludwig III
- King of Prussia – Wilhelm II
- King of Saxony – Frederick Augustus III
- King of Württemberg – William II

==== Grand Duchies ====
- Grand Duke of Baden – Frederick II
- Grand Duke of Hesse – Ernest Louis
- Grand Duke of Mecklenburg-Schwerin – Frederick Francis IV
- Grand Duke of Mecklenburg-Strelitz – Adolphus Frederick VI
- Grand Duke of Oldenburg – Frederick Augustus II
- Grand Duke of Saxe-Weimar-Eisenach – William Ernest

==== Principalities ====
- Schaumburg-Lippe – Adolf II, Prince of Schaumburg-Lippe
- Schwarzburg-Rudolstadt – Günther Victor, Prince of Schwarzburg
- Schwarzburg-Sondershausen – Günther Victor, Prince of Schwarzburg
- Principality of Lippe – Leopold IV, Prince of Lippe
- Reuss Elder Line – Heinrich XXIV, Prince Reuss of Greiz (with Heinrich XXVII, Prince Reuss Younger Line, as regent)
- Reuss Younger Line – Heinrich XXVII, Prince Reuss Younger Line
- Waldeck and Pyrmont – Friedrich, Prince of Waldeck and Pyrmont

==== Duchies ====
- Duke of Anhalt – Frederick II, Duke of Anhalt
- Duke of Brunswick – Ernest Augustus, Duke of Brunswick
- Duke of Saxe-Altenburg – Ernst II, Duke of Saxe-Altenburg
- Duke of Saxe-Coburg and Gotha – Charles Edward, Duke of Saxe-Coburg and Gotha
- Duke of Saxe-Meiningen – Bernhard III, Duke of Saxe-Meiningen

==== Colonial Governors ====
- Cameroon (Kamerun) to 4 March – Karl Ebermaier (2nd and final term) (formally, although territory under British/French occupation)
- German East Africa (Deutsch-Ostafrika) – Albert Heinrich Schnee

== Events ==
- 4 March – Germany surrenders German Cameroon (Kamerun) to British and French occupying forces.
- August - the Internment of the Greek IV Corps at Görlitz begins
- August 28 – WWI:
  - Germany declares war on Romania.
  - Italy declares war on Germany.
- 28 September - the 1916 Berlin strike begins
- 4 September – Germany surrenders Togoland to British and French occupying forces.

=== Date unknown ===
- The 1916 Summer Olympics are cancelled in Berlin
- Food is rationed in the German Empire.
- Oxycodone, a narcotic painkiller closely related to codeine, is first synthesized.

== Births ==
- 10 January – Richard Münch, German actor (died 1987)
- 23 January – Olaf Andreas Gulbransson, German architect (died 1961)
- 12 February – Helmut Gröttrup, German electrical engineer (died 1981)
- 4 March – Hans Eysenck, German-born British psychologist (died 1997)
- 10 May – Alfred Weidenmann, German film director and actor (died 2000)
- 9 June – Siegfried Graetschus, SS officer (died 1943)
- 22 June – Emil Fackenheim, German-born Israeli Jewish philosopher and Reform rabbi (died 2003)
- 26 June – Yitzhak Danziger, German-born Israeli sculptor (died 1977)
- 2 July – Hans-Ulrich Rudel, German WWII pilot (died 1982)
- 17 July – Henning Brandis, German physician and microbiologist (died 2004)
- 14 August – Heinrich Prinz zu Sayn-Wittgenstein, German night fighter pilot and flying ace (died 1944)
- 7 September – Käthe Menzel-Jordan, German architect and preservationist (died 2026)
- 20 September – Rudolf August Oetker, German entrepreneur (died 2007)
- 26 November – Gerhard Unger, German tenor (died 2011)
- 19 December – Elisabeth Noelle-Neumann, German political scientist (died 2010)

== Deaths ==
- 12 February – Richard Dedekind, mathematician (born 1831)
- 4 March – Franz Marc, painter (born 1880)
- 11 May:
  - Max Reger, Modernist composer, pianist, conductor, writer and professor (born 1873)
  - Karl Schwarzschild, Jewish-German physicist (born 1873)
- 13 July – Josef Rieder (cyclist)
- 11 October – Otto, former King of Bavaria, nobleman (born 1848).
- 8 November – Prince Heinrich of Bavaria (born 1884)
- 4 December – Hans Schilling (aviator), aviator (born 1892)
- 5 December - Dowager Grand Duchess of Mecklenburg-Strelitz, grandmother of Adolphus Frederick VI, Grand Duke of Mecklenburg-Strelitz (born 1822 in the United Kingdom)
- 19 December – Guido Henckel von Donnersmarck, industrialist and nobleman (born 1830)
