= 2015 in Germany =

- Decades: 1990s; 2000s; 2010s; 2020s; 2030s
- See also: Other events of 2015; History of Germany • Timeline • Years

The following lists events that happened in 2015 in Germany.

== Incumbents ==
- President: Joachim Gauck
- Chancellor: Angela Merkel

== Events ==
=== January ===
- 1 January - The 'Mindestlohngesetz' (German Minimum Wage Law) comes into effect: Most jobs now have to receive €8.50 per hour as a minimum wage.
- 11 January - An arson attack on the newspaper Hamburger Morgenpost, which published Charlie Hebdo cartoons, leads to two arrests.
- 21 January - Lutz Bachmann resigns as chairman of the anti-Islamic Pegida movement. As of 9 April, the position is still vacant.

=== February ===
- 5–15 February - 140th Berlin International Film Festival
- 15 February: Hamburg state election, 2015 in Hamburg

=== March ===
- March - German company Dr Oetker buys German company Coppenrath & Wiese
- 5 March - Germany in the Eurovision Song Contest 2015
- 24 March - The crash of Germanwings Flight 9525 leads to widespread media coverage and public attention in Germany. 72 Germans die aboard the German machine that was intentionally crashed by its German co-pilot.
- March – CeBIT in Hanover
- March – ITB Berlin in Berlin
- March – Leipzig Book Fair in Leipzig

=== April ===
- April – Hanover Messe in Hanover
- April – Deutscher Filmpreis in Berlin

=== May ===
- 10 May - Bremen state election, 2015 in Bremen

=== June ===
- 7–8 June – 41st G7 summit was held in Schloss Elmau, Bavaria.
- June – Kiel Week in Kiel
- 29 June – A robot grabbed a man at a Volkswagen production plant in Baunatal and crushed him to death against a metal plate. Prosecutors considered bringing charges after the incident.

=== August ===
- August – Hanse Sail in Rostock
- August- September – Internationale Funkausstellung Berlin in Berlin
- August 31 - Chancellor Angela Merkel makes her we can do this statement during the 2015 European migrant crisis.

=== September ===
- September – ILA Berlin Air Show in Berlin
- September – Gamescom in Cologne
- September – Frankfurt Motor Show in Frankfurt
- 30 September – Alex Springer Media Group is ordered to pay €635,000 compensation for damages for pain and suffering to journalist and weather presenter Jörg Kachelmann following their reporting of a case in which he was falsely accused of rape. The award was a record sum for such as case, though later reduced to €395,000 on appeal.
- September - October – Oktoberfest in Munich

=== October ===
- October – Frankfurt Book Fair in Frankfurt

=== November ===
- November - German company Merck Group buys American company Sigma-Aldrich
- November - Japanese company Hitachi Koki buys German company Metabo

=== December ===
- 31 December –
  - New Year's Eve sexual assaults in Germany
  - Mein Kampf copyright runs out

== Deaths ==
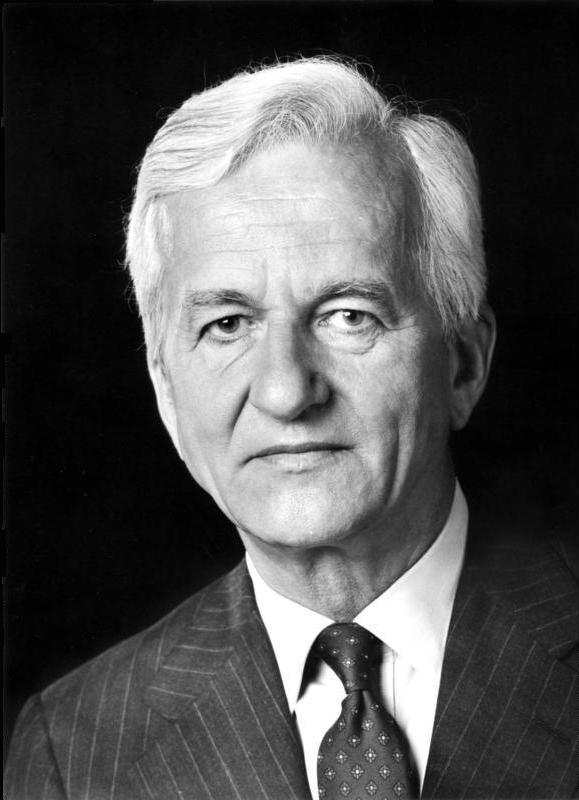
Richard von Weizsäcker

- 1 January: Ulrich Beck (70), German sociologist (born 1944)
- 7 January: Diether Kressel (89), German painter (born 1925)
- 8 January: Hubert Markl (77), German biologist (born 1938)
- 20 January: Edgar Froese (71), German artist and electronic music pioneer (born 1944)
- 25 January - Ernst Träger, German judge (born 1926)
- 31 January: Udo Lattek (79), German football player, coach, and TV pundit (born 1935)
- 31 January: Richard von Weizsäcker (94), German politician (born 1920)
- 18 February: Hans F. Zacher, German jurist (born 1928)
- 26 February: Heinrich Windelen (93), German politician (born 1921)
- 26 February: Fritz J. Raddatz (83), German feuilletonist, essayist, biographer and romancier (born 1931)
- 1 March: Chris Welp (51), German professional basketball player (born 1964)
- 1 March: Wolfram Wuttke (53), German footballer (born 1961)
- 5 March: Karina Kraushaar, German actress (born 1971)
- 9 March: Frei Otto (90), German architect (born 1925)
- 26 March: Friedrich L. Bauer, German computer scientist (born 1924)
- 30 March: Helmut Dietl (70), German film director and author (born 1944)
- 31 March: Klaus Tschira (74), German entrepreneur (born 1940)

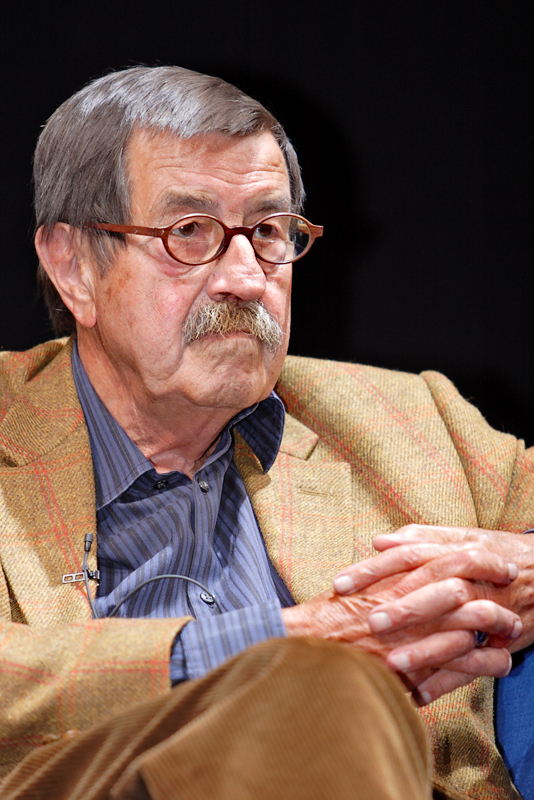
Günter Grass

- 13 April: Günter Grass (87), German novelist and author (born 1927)
- 14 April: Klaus Bednarz (72), German journalist (born 1942)
- 9 May: Odo Marquard (86), German philosoph (born 1928)
- 19 May: Gerald Götting (91), German politician (born 1923)
- 20 May: Manfred Müller, German bishop or Roman Catholic Church (born 1926)
- 27 May: Elisabeth Wiedemann (88), German actress (born 1926)
- 3 June: Horst Brandstätter (81), German businessman (born 1933)
- 4 June: Hermann Zapf (96), German typeface designer and calligrapher (born 1918)
- 4 June: Edith Hancke (86), German film actress (born 1928)
- 9 June: James Last (86), German composer and big band leader (born 1929)
- 15 June: Harry Rowohlt (70), German writer and translator (born 1945)
- 21 Jun: Alexander Schalck-Golodkowski (83), German politician (born 1932)
- 22 June: Gabriele Wohmann (83), German novelist (born 1932)
- 13 July: Philipp Mißfelder (35), German politician (born 1979)
- 14 July: Wolf Gremm (73), German film director and screenwriter (born 1942)
- 3 August: Johanna Quandt (89), German entrepreneur (born 1926)
- 11 August: Utta Danella (95), German author (born 1920)
- 15 August: Max Greger (89), German jazz musician (born 1926)
- 17 August: Gerhard Mayer-Vorfelder (82), Vice President of the Union of European Football Associations (UEFA) (born 1933)
- 20 August: Egon Bahr (93), German politician (born 1922)
- 4 September: Max Kruse (93), German author (born 1921)
- 4 September: Rainer Kirsch, German writer and journalist (born 1934)
- 24 September: Ellis Kaut (94), German author of children's literature, best known for her creation of Pumuckl (born 1920)
- 29 September: Hellmuth Karasek (81), German journalist, literary critic and novelist (born 1934)
- 1 November: Günter Schabowski (86), German official of the Socialist Unity Party of Germany (SED) (born 1922)
- 5 November: Hans Mommsen (85), German historian (born 1930)

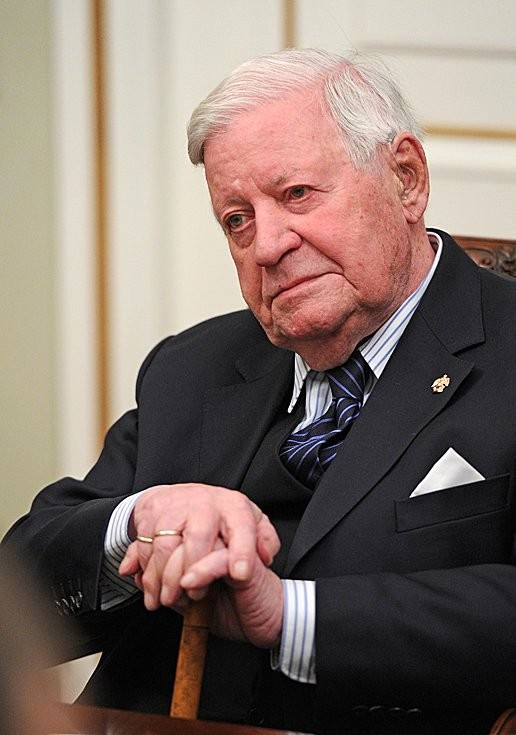
Helmut Schmidt

- 10 November: Helmut Schmidt (96), German chancellor (born 1918)
- 5 December: Wolfgang Sandner (66), German physicist (born 1949)
- 15 December: Stella Doufexis (47), German mezzo-soprano opera singer (born 1968)
- 19 December: Kurt Masur (88), German conductor (born 1927)

== See also ==
- 2015 in German television
