= Petro Tyschtschenko =

German businessman

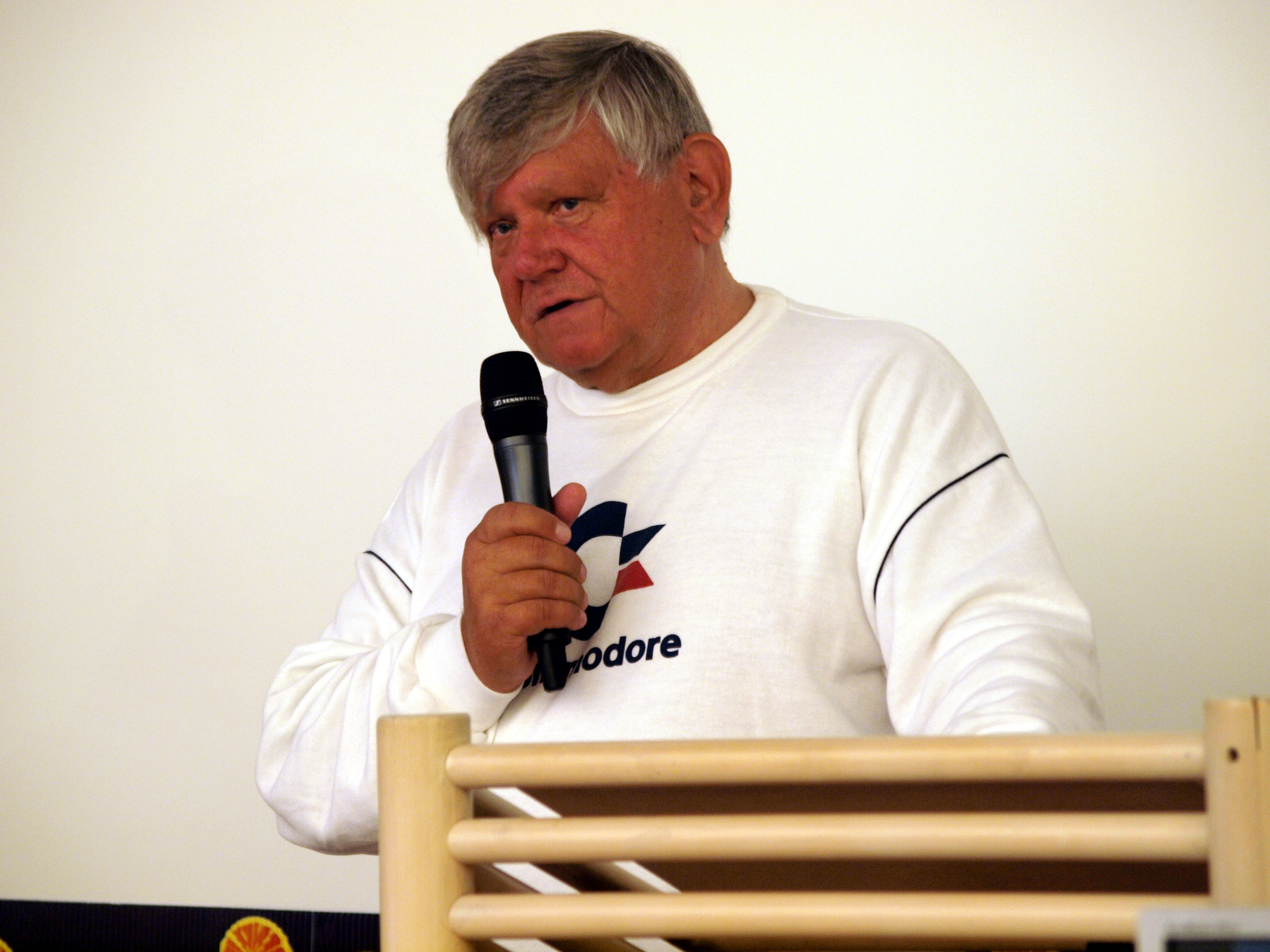
- Tyschtschenko at an Amiga user club meeting in Tampere, Finland in September 2014.
- Born: 13 April 1943 (age 83); Wien, Germany (now Vienna, Austria)
- Occupation: Businessman

Petro Taras Ostap Tyschtschenko (born 16 April 1943) is a German businessman best known for his role in developing the European market for the American computer company Commodore International.

== Early life ==
Tyschtschenko was born in Vienna, Austria, in 1943. His father, originally from Ukraine, fled to Austria during World War I, where he later met his wife. The couple married in 1941 and had their son Petro two years later. After the Second World War, the family moved to Bavaria in Germany, where Tyschtschenko attended school. In 1966, he completed his military service in the German Bundeswehr.

== Career ==
Tyschtschenko first came into contact with Commodore in 1982, when he saw a job advertisement in a newspaper. Salomon+Schimmelmann, a German headhunter company, was looking for a new business administrator for Commodore. Tyschtschenko immediately signed up for a job interview, but was not hired. However, he later received a telephone call from Harald Speyer, the director of Commodore's German market, saying he would want to hire Tyschtschenko as a business administrator and wanted him to start as soon as possible. Tyschtschenko immediately resigned from his current job at the company Addressograph-Multigraph and joined Commodore the next day.

Tyschtschenko later became the director of logistics for the whole European market at Commodore, responsible for the sales and delivery of the VIC-20 and Commodore 64 all over Germany and other European countries. He then became Commodore's global logistics manager. After Commodore bought the new computer start-up company Amiga Corporation, Tyschtschenko's duties expanded to the Amiga line as well.

== Commodore Bankruptcy ==
Petro worked on a bid with Escom, a company he had a previous sales relationship in his role as global logistics director for Commodore. During the Amiga Buyout He worked with Escom and New Star Electronics to bid against Dell and Creative Electronics International. Other parties did not bid such as Commodore Uk and Samsung. New Star Electronics were also doing a deal with Commodore UK and pulled out 48 hours before the bidding process, preventing Commodore Uk from bidding.

== Amiga Technologies ==
Petro became director of Amiga Technologies after the Escom Buy out. The subsidiary company revealed a new Amiga logo and released a hardware and software bundle called the Amiga Magic Pack. This was an Amiga 1200, sold for £400 in a single box, along with two games, the Deluxe Paint AGA painting software, the Wordsworth 2 word processor, and Print Manager. A £500 bundle was released that added a hard drive and more productivity software.

Amiga Technologies licensed its hardware to many companies such as Regent Electronics Corporation who created the Wonder TV A6000.

Petro was insistent that Amiga Technologies should operate as a viable business without asking for additional financial help from Escom.

Amiga Technologies developed the Prototype Amiga Walker

== AMIGA International, Inc. ==
Under Gateway 2000 Petro became president of Amiga International. Amiga International granted the German company Haage & Partner licenses to develop AmigaOS 3.5 and AmigaOS OS 3.9

== Current life ==
Tyschtschenko is no longer professionally employed in the Amiga market. He has founded his own consulting company Power Service GmbH. Even though Tyschtschenko no longer works with Amigas, he is still active in the Amiga user and fan community, visiting numerous Amiga club meetings all over the world every year.

After an appearance at Amiga: 30 years in Amsterdam (an event to celebrate the 30th birthday of the Amiga computer), Tyschtschenko announced the sale of his Commodore/Amiga Technologies collection

Tyschtschenko is married since 1970 to his wife Erika and has a daughter Tanja (born 1972) and a son Taras (born 1974).

== Sources ==
- Tyschtschenko, Petro: Meine Erinnerungen an Commodore und Amiga, self-published 2014, ISBN 978-3-9816579-0-6.
- Petro T. Tyschtschenko announces the sale of his Commodore collection: http://commodore.ninja/petro-t-tyschtschenko-announces-the-sale-of-his-commodore-collection/
