= Franz Becker =

German footballer (1918–1965)

Personal information
- Date of birth: 1 March 1918
- Place of birth: Germany
- Date of death: 26 May 1965 (aged 47)
- Height: 1.55 m (5 ft 1 in)
- Position: Midfielder

Senior career*
Years	Team	Apps	(Gls)
1936–1950	SC Rapid Köln 04		
1950–1954	1. FC Köln		
- * Club domestic league appearances and goals

Franz Becker (1 March 1918 – 26 May 1965) was a German footballer. He played with 1. FC Köln for three years between 1951 and 1954 together with Hans Schäfer, Josef Röhrig and Fritz Herkenrath in the Western league.

In these years, he participated in 28 games, scoring one goal.
