= Henriette Hanke =

German author

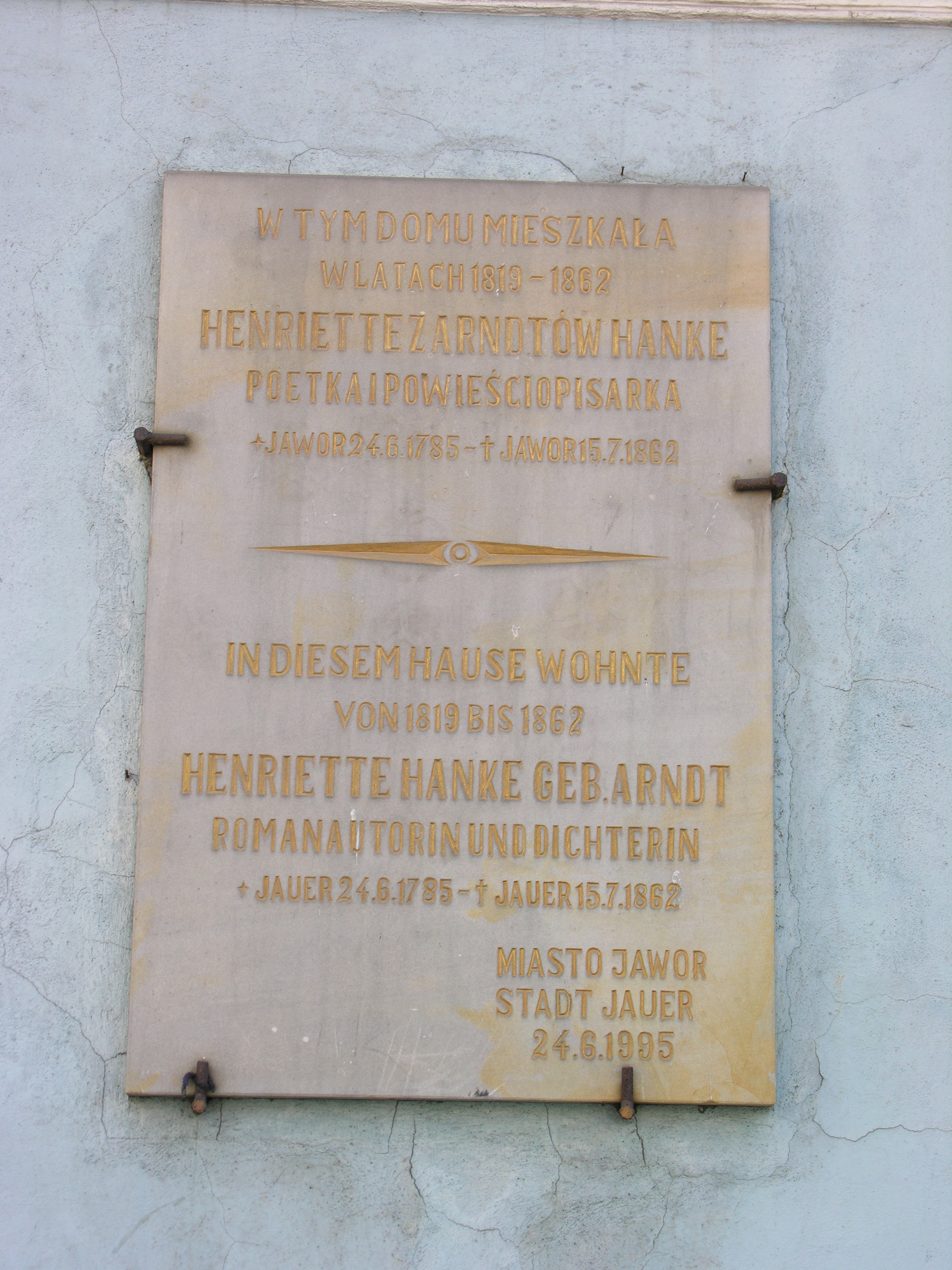
- Memorial plaque for Henriette Hanke on her house in Jawor
- Born: 24 June 1785; Jauer
- Died: 15 July 1862 (aged 77); Jauer

Henriette Hanke (24 June 1785 – 15 July 1862) is considered one of the most prolific German authors of the first half of the 19th century.

== Biography ==
Henriette Hanke was born Henriette Arndt in Jauer on 24 June 1785. Her father was businessman Johann Jakob Arndt. When she was thirty Hanke unwillingly became the third wife of pastor Gottfried Heinrich Carl Hanke. He lived in Dyhernfurth. Hanke raised his six children from his first wife. When her husband died in 1819 Hanke returned to her parents' home and spent the rest of her life there.

Hanke began publishing novels which were aimed at women. They were generally successful. Later she switched to more educational novels which included themes of women being there as a comforter and counselor. Hanke wrote 88 volumes, some of which have been translated from German into English, Swedish, Danish, Russian and Polish.

Hanke died in Jauer in 1862. Her grave was lost around 1970. Her home town put a plaque up to her in 1997.
