= Christian Friedrich Illgen =

German Protestant theologian (1786–1844)

Christian Friedrich Illgen (16 September 1786 – 4 August 1844) was a German Protestant theologian, known for his work in the field of historical theology.

Illgen was born in Chemnitz. He studied theology at the University of Leipzig, where in 1814 he obtained his habilitation. In 1818 he became an associate professor of philosophy, and several years later, an associate professor of theology. From 1825 onward, he served as a full professor of theology at the University of Leipzig. On four occasions he was dean to the faculty of theology (1830/31, 1833/34, 1837/38, 1841/42).

In 1814 he founded the successful Historisch-theologische Gesellschaft zu Leipzig, an association for the promotion of church history studies. Beginning in 1832, he was editor of the periodical Zeitschrift für die historische Theologie (Magazine of Historical Theology). After his death in Leipzig in 1844, publication of the journal was continued by Christian Wilhelm Niedner.

== Selected works ==
- Vita Laelii Socini : specimen historico-ecclesiasticum, 1814.
- Der Werth der christlichen Dogmengeschichte, 1817 – The value of Christian dogmatic history.
- Denkschrift der historisch-theologischen Gesellschaft zu Leipzig, 1817 – Memoirs of the historical-theological society of Leipzig.
- Symbolarum ad vitam et doctrinam Laelii Socini, 1826.
- Memoria utriusque catechismi Lutheri, 1829-30 (4 volumes).
- Historiae Collegii Philobiblici Lipsiensis, 1836-41 (4 parts).
