= Christian Herwartz =

German Catholic priest (1943–2022)

- Born: Christian Maria Oskar Herwartz; 16 April 1943; Stralsund, Pomerania, Prussia, Germany
- Died: 20 February 2022 (aged 78); Berlin, Germany
- Occupation: Catholic priest
- Awards: Order of Merit of the Federal Republic of Germany; Ecumenical Prize

Christian Maria Oskar Herwartz SJ (16 April 1943 – 20 February 2022), was a German Catholic priest. He was a member of the Society of Jesus, and was active as a worker-priest, author and blogger. After three years working in France, he lived from 1978 to 2016 with other Jesuits in a community he co-founded in Berlin that offered a place to stay for people in need. Herwartz is regarded as the founder of the Exerzitien auf der Straße movement, adapting the order's spiritual exercises to life among the masses. The community held regular peace prayers in Berlin until 2020.

== Life ==
Herwartz was born in Stralsund, the eldest of six brothers. His father, Oskar Herwarth (1915–2002), was a sailor in World War II, serving aboard U-843, later becoming a captain of the German Navy.

The family moved often, and Christian left high school before he graduated. After two years of practice (Praktikum) of mechanical engineering at a shipyard in Kiel, he became a soldier in the German Army, reaching the rank of Reserveoffizier. In 1967, he applied to be a conscientious objector. He then planned to become a mechanical engineer and serve in foreign aid (Entwicklungshilfe). In 1969, Herwartz completed the Abitur at the Collegium Marianum in Neuss. He became a novice of the Society of Jesus the same year. As a novice, he practiced the Spiritual Exercises of Ignatius of Loyola and the prescribed "experiments" in a hospital, a psychiatry ward and among homeless people. He then studied philosophy for two years at the order's Munich School of Philosophy, followed by studies of theology at the Sankt Georgen Graduate School of Philosophy and Theology in Frankfurt that he completed in 1975. He focused on liberation theology. His final treatise was titled In das Gespräch mit der Geschichte treten – Eine Auseinandersetzung mit den geistlichen Übungen von Ignatius von Loyola, dealing with the spiritual exercises.

=== Worker-priest ===
Beginning in 1975, Herwartz lived in the Jesuit community in Toulouse to learn about the worker-priest movement. He then worked as a driver for a moving company and as a worker in aluminum processing. He was ordained as a priest in Frankfurt in 1976, but kept it a secret from his employer, as priests were often regarded as socialist. When he joined a trade union in 1977, he was fired. He then trained in Strasbourg to be a machinist and worked in Paris for a temporary work agency. He lived in Berlin from 1978 in a community he had co-founded, working as a machinist for Siemens. Herwartz was unemployed from 2000. He began to reflect his religious existence publicly in books and on the internet.

=== Community ===
In 1978, Herwartz founded a community in Berlin, together with Jesuits Michael Walzer and Peter Mustó. It was located in workers' quarters, first in Wedding, then in Kreuzberg, and from 1984 on at Naunynstraße 60 where the community welcomes people in need without asking for a reason. They were joined in 1980 by the Swiss Jesuit Franz Keller, who died in 2014. The project was supported by the order. The community has been open for guests and housemates. Herwartz and Keller had no individual rooms, but lived in communal rooms with several beds. Hundreds of people from more than 70 nationalities and many religious backgrounds lived there, on average 16 at a time. Some had been released from prison or homeless. Each Saturday morning, a breakfast is open for everybody from the streets. The community held peace prayers at several locations in Berlin, including a monthly interfaith peace prayer at the Gendarmenmarkt from 2002 to 2020. The community continued on after Herwatz left.

=== Social engagement ===
Herwartz was an activist for prisoners, and joined political discussions with them. He was imprisoned twice, once in 1987 because of his boycott of the 1987 census, and in 1997 for insulting a policeman during a demonstration at the Siemens gate. He was a member of the group Ordensleute gegen Ausgrenzung, fighting exclusion. They met regularly from 1995 for prayer vigils in front of the prison for the deportation prison in Berlin-Köpenick until it was closed.

=== Exerzitien auf der Straße ===
Herwartz is regarded as the founder of the Exerzitien auf der Straße movement, adapting the order's spiritual exercises to life in the streets. He began in 1998, together with Alex Lefrank, also a Jesuit and mentor of spiritual exercises, leading exercises in the streets for a group of three Jesuits. They first offered a public program in 2000: they "tried to seek meditation, reflection, perhaps even the experience of closeness to God in the noise, dirt and misery of the big city" ("zu versuchen: eine Meditation, eine Reflexion, vielleicht sogar das Erlebnis einer Gottesnähe im Lärm, im Dreck und im Elend der Großstadt zu suchen"). In retirement, Herwartz intensified the programs with greater conceptual depth and more publicity. The movement found followers in Germany and worldwide.

=== Later life ===
In 2016, Herwartz left the community for health reasons. He moved to the Canisius-Kolleg Berlin, and maintained his activities for the street exercises. Due to the COVID-19 pandemic, he moved to his order's retirement home in Berlin-Kladow in March 2020 to protect himself better from exposure to the coronavirus.

Herwartz died at the Gemeinschaftskrankenhaus Havelhöhe in Berlin-Kladow after surgery on 20 February 2022, at the age of 78.

== Awards ==
Herwatz was honored with the Order of Merit of the Federal Republic of Germany. He was awarded the Ecumenical Prize in 2013.

== Publications ==
- "Fremdarbeiter" in der Bundesrepublik Deutschland. In: Christian Herwartz et al. (eds.): Damit alle leben können. Mainz 1973, pp. 43–79.
- Exerzitien in städtischen Brennpunkten. In: Geist und Leben 74 (2001), pp. 269–302.
- (ed.) Gastfreundschaft – Der ständige Wechsel vom Gast zum Gastgeber und wieder zum Gast. Berlin 2004 (online).
- Auf nackten Sohlen. (= Ignatianische Impulse 18). 2nd edition, Echter, Würzburg 2010, ISBN 978-3-429-02839-8.
- (ed. with Renate Trobitzsch) Geschwister erleben. Berlin 2010
- Brennende Gegenwart. Exerzitien auf der Straße. (= Ignatianische Impulse 51) Echter, Würzburg 2011, ISBN 978-3-429-03428-3.
- (ed. with Godehard Brüntrup and Hermann Kügler Unheilige Macht. Der Jesuitenorden und die Missbrauchskrise. Kohlhammer Verlag, 2nd edition, Stuttgart 2013, ISBN 978-3-17-023289-1.
- (with Sabine Wollowski) Brücke sein. Vom Arbeiterpriester zum Bruder. Edition Steinrich, Berlin 2013, ISBN 978-3-942085-31-1.
- Dem Auferstandenen heute begegnen. Eine Standortbestimmung von Exerzitien auf der Straße. In: Geist und Leben 87 (2014), pp. 252–260.
- (ed. with Maria Jans-Wenstrup, Katharina Prinz, Elisabeth Tollkötter, Josef Freise) Im Alltag der Straße Gottes Spuren suchen. Persönliche Begegnungen in Straßenexerzitien. Neukirchener Verlag, Neukirchen-Vluyn 2016, 2nd edition 2019, ISBN 978-3-7615-6270-3.
- (ed. with Nadine Sylla) Einfach ohne. Berlin 2016
