= 1943 in Germany =

- Decades: 1920s; 1930s; 1940s; 1950s; 1960s
- See also: Other events of 1943; History of Germany • Timeline • Years

Events in the year 1943 in Germany.

== Incumbents ==
=== National level ===
Head of State and Chancellor

- Adolf Hitler (the Führer)

== Events ==
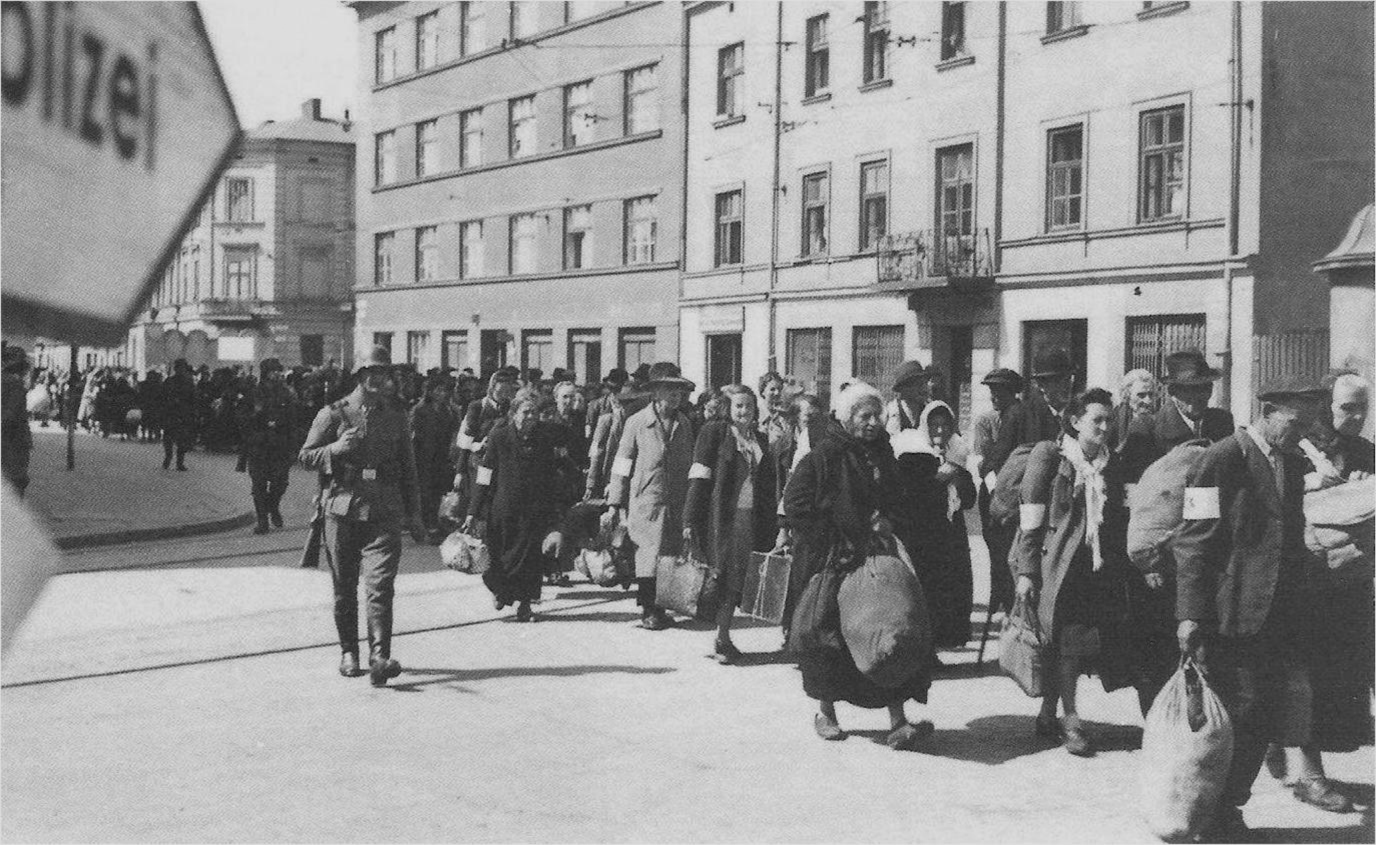
Jewish prisoners being deported from the Kraków Ghetto.

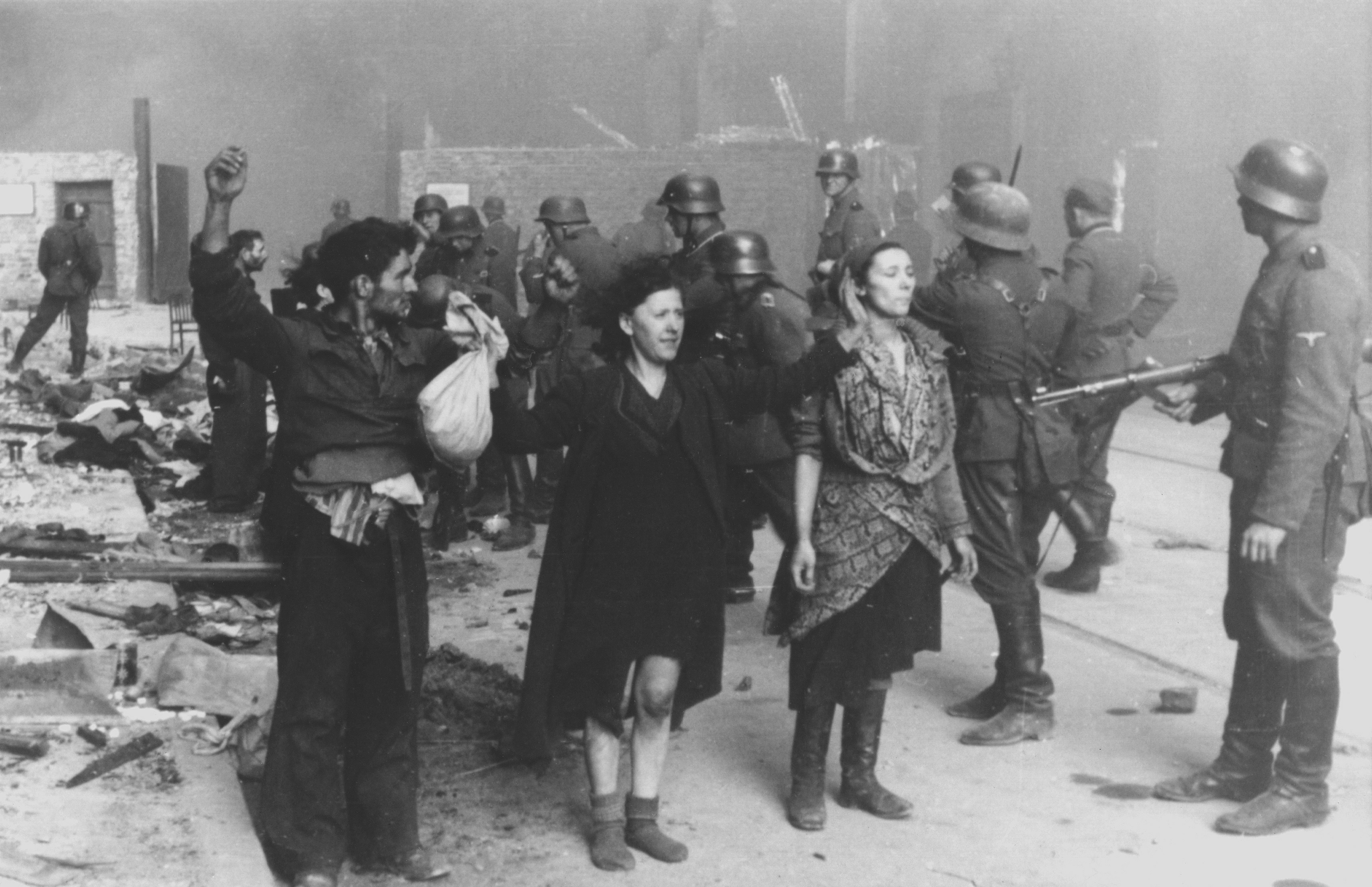
This photograph, from the Stroop Report, shows captured fighters in the Warsaw Ghetto Uprising.

The bombing of Hamburg during 1943.

- 18 January – World War II: Soviet officials announce they have broken the Wehrmacht's siege of Leningrad.
- 18 January – The Warsaw Ghetto Uprising begins.
- 27 January – World War II: 64 bombers mount the first all American air raid against Germany (Wilhelmshaven is the target).
- 29 January – German police arrest alleged necrophiliac Bruno Ludke.
- 29 January – Dr Ernst Kaltenbrunner succeeds the late Reinhard Heydrich as head of the RSHA SS-Reichssicherheitshauptamt controlling the Schutzstaffel Gestapo
- 2 February – World War II: In Russia, the Battle of Stalingrad comes to an end with the surrender of the German 6th Army and its 91,000 remaining soldiers.
- 3 February – World War II: The Four Chaplains of the U.S. Army are drowned, when their ship (Dorchester) is struck by a German torpedo.
- 14 February – World War II: Battle of the Kasserine Pass: German General Erwin Rommel and his Afrika Korps launch an offensive against Allied defenses in Tunisia.
- 16 February – World War II: The Soviet Union reconquers Kharkov, but is later driven out in the Third Battle of Kharkov
- 18 February – In a speech at the Berlin Sportpalast, German Propaganda Minister Joseph Goebbels declare a "Total War" against the Allies.
- 18 February – The Nazis arrest the members of the White Rose movement.
- 22 February – Members of White Rose are executed in Nazi Germany.
- 28 February – Operation Gunnerside: 6 Norwegians led by Joachim Ronneberg successfully attack the heavy water plant Vemork.
- 1 March – Heinz Guderian becomes the Inspector-General of the Armoured Troops for Nazi Germany's Army.
- 13 March – Holocaust: German forces liquidate the Jewish ghetto in Kraków.
- 16 March – 19 March – World War II: 22 ships from Convoys HX 229/SC 122 and one U-boat are sunk in the largest North Atlantic U-boat wolfpack attack of the war.
- 22 March – World War II: The entire population of Khatyn in Belarus is burnt alive by the Ukrainian Schutzmannschaft Bataillon 118 and assisted by troops from SS-Sonderbataillon Dirlewanger in retaliation for an attack of a German convoy by Soviet partisans.
- 26 March – Adolf Hitler writes to Benito Mussolini that Russia is so weakened by the defence of Stalingrad that it cannot possibly be a serious menace.
- 13 April – World War II: Radio Berlin announces the discovery by Wehrmacht of mass graves of Poles killed by Soviets in the Katyn massacre.
- 6 May – World War II: Six U-boats are sunk after sinking 12 ships from Convoy ONS 5, regarded as the turning point in the North Atlantic U-boat war.
- 13 May – World War II: German Afrika Korps and Italian troops in North Africa surrender to Allied forces.
- 15 May – The Comintern is dissolved in Moscow.
- 16 May – World War II: Operation Chastise by RAF 617 Sqdn is carried out on German dams.
- 16 May – Holocaust: The Warsaw Ghetto Uprising ends.
- 24 May – Holocaust: Josef Mengele becomes the chief medical officer of Auschwitz.
- 5 July – World War II: Operation Citadel commences, resulting in the Battle of Kursk – The largest tank battle in history begins, with German Panther tanks seeing combat for the first time.
- 12 July – World War II – Battle of Prokhorovka: The Wehrmacht and the Red Army fight to a draw.
- 24 July – World War II: Operation Gomorrah begins: British and Canadian aeroplanes bomb Hamburg by night, those of the Americans by day.
- 27 July – World War II: Operation Gomorrah – The continued British bombing of Hamburg, initiates a firestorm. The fire rages through the night into the morning of the 28th, causing the majority of Operation Gomorrah's deaths.
- 3 August – World War II: Operation Gomorrah closes, with an estimated 42,600 killed and 37,000 wounded; much of Hamburg is leveled.
- 23 August – The Battle of Kursk ends with a serious strategic defeat for the German forces.
- 24 August – World War II: – Heinrich Himmler is named Reichsminister of the Interior in Germany.
- 29 August – World War II: Germany dissolves the Danish government after it refuses to deal with a wave of strikes and disturbances to the satisfaction of the German authorities (see Occupation of Denmark).
- 8 September – World War II: Frascati bombing raid September 8, 1943: The USAAF bombs the German General Headquarters for the Mediterranean zone.
- 12 September – World War II: German paratroopers rescue Benito Mussolini from imprisonment, in Operation Eiche.
- 13 October – World War II: The new government of Italy sides with the Allies and declares war on Germany.
- 17 October – World War II: The last commerce raider, auxiliary cruiser Michel, was sunk off Japan by United States submarine Tarpon.
- 22 October – World War II: The RAF delivers a highly destructive airstrike on the German industrial and population center of Kassel.
- 15 November – Porajmos: German SS leader Heinrich Himmler orders that Gypsies and "part-Gypsies" be put "on the same level as Jews and placed in concentration camps."
- 18 November – World War II: The Royal Air Force opens its bombing campaign against Berlin, with 440 planes causing only light damage and killing 131. The RAF loses 9 aircraft and 53 aviators.
- 23 November – The Deutsche Opernhaus on Bismarckstraße in the Berlin neighborhood of Charlottenburg is destroyed.
- 2 December – A Luftwaffe bombing raid on the harbour of Bari, Italy, sinks an American ship with a mustard gas stockpile, causing numerous fatalities; the exact death toll is unresolved, as the bombing raid itself causes hundreds of deaths as well.
- 11 December – United States Army Air Corps raids a U-boat yard at Emden, losing 20 planes but shooting down 138 German fighters.
- 20 December – First flight of a true four-engined version of the troubled He 177A heavy bomber, as the Heinkel He 177 V102 prototype of the Heinkel He 177B series makes its maiden flight with four separate Daimler-Benz DB 603 engines at the Heinkel-Sud factory airfield in Schwechat.

== Births ==
- 6 January – Wilhelm Kuhweide, German sailor
- 12 January – Brun-Otto Bryde, German judge
- 14 January – Manfred Wolke, German boxer (died 2024)
- 22 January – Wilhelm Genazino, German author and journalist (died 2018)
- 24 January - Peter Struck, German politician (died 2012)
- 25 January -
  - Dagmar Berghoff, German journalist and television presenter
  - Roy Black, German actor and singer (died 1991)
- 11 February – Gerhard Glogowski, German politician
- 12 February – Rainer Eppelmann, German politician
- 13 February – Friedrich Christian Delius, German writer (died 2022)
- 15 February – Elke Heidenreich, German author and television presenter
- 21 February – Paul Kirchhof, German judge
- 22 February – Horst Köhler, German banker and politician, President of Germany (died 2025)
- 27 February – Klaus Köste, German gymnast (died 2012)
- 24 March – Marika Kilius, German pair skater
- 12 April
  - Lothar Kobluhn, German football player (died 2019)
  - Michael Otto, German entrepreneur
- 16 April
  - Christian Herwartz, German Catholic priest (died 2022)
  - Petro Tyschtschenko, German businessman
- 19 April – Claus Theo Gärtner, German actor
- 1 May – Sabine Uecker, German politician
- 2 May – Manfred Schnelldorfer, German figure skater
- 6 May – Wolfgang Reinhard, German pole vaulter (died 2011)
- 10 May – Wolfgang Porsche, German manager
- 18 May – Helmut Haussmann, German politician
- 22 May – Gesine Schwan, German politician
- 24 May – Gerd Gies, German politician
- 31 May – Antje Vollmer, German theologian and politician (died 2023)
- 28 June – Klaus von Klitzing, German physicist, Nobel Prize laureate
- 30 June – Hartmann von der Tann, German journalist
- 30 June – Dieter Kottysch, German boxer (died 2017)
- 4 July
  - Conny Bauer, German trombonist
  - Heide Simonis, writer and politician (died 2023)
- 6 July – Hans-Jürgen Papier, German judge
- 7 July – Jürgen Geschke, German track cyclist
- 25 July
  - Hans-Peter Kaul, German judge (died 2014)
  - Erika Steinbach, German politician
- 29 July
  - Michael Holm, German singer
  - Ingrid Krämer, German diver
- 4 August – Barbara Saß-Viehweger, German politician, lawyer and civil law notary
- 12 August – Herta Däubler-Gmelin, politician
- 27 August – Wolfgang Nordwig, German pole vaulter
- 3 September
  - Dagmar Schipanski, German physicist and politician (died 2022)
  - Lothar Voigtländer, German composer (died 2026)
- 7 September – Lena Valaitis, German singer
- 10 September – Horst-Dieter Höttges, German footballer (died 2023)
- 16 September
  - Oskar Lafontaine, German politician
  - Bärbel Wartenberg-Potter, German Lutheran bishop
- 25 September – Willi Entenmann, footballer and coach (died 2012)
- 27 September – Walter Riester, German politician
- 28 September
  - Michael Herz, German businessman
  - Ursula Werner, German actress
- 29 September – Wolfgang Overath, German footballer
- 30 September – Johann Deisenhofer, German biochemist, Nobel Prize laureate
- 6 October – Udo Zimmermann, German composer and opera director (died 2021)
- 19 October – Axel Ullrich, German biologist
- 20 October – Madeleine Schickedanz, German entrepreneur
- 22 October – Wolfgang Thierse, German politician
- 28 October – Cornelia Froboess, German actress
- 20 November – Bernard Broermann, German businessman (died 2024)
- 21 November – Kasper König, German museum director (died 2024)
- 23 November – Günther Beckstein, German politician
- 1 December – Ortrun Enderlein, German luger, Olympic champion (1964)
- 8 December – Bodo Tümmler, German Olympic middle-distance runner
- 12 December – Renate Schmidt, German politician
- 17 December – Heidemarie Koch, German archaeologist (died 2022)
- 23 December – Queen Silvia of Sweden
- 25 December – Hanna Schygulla, German actress
- 31 December – Wolfgang Gerhardt, German politician (died 2024)

== Deaths ==
- 10 January – Erich von Drygalski, German geographer and leader of the Gauss South Polar Expedition (born 1865)
- 13 January – Else Ury, German writer (born 1877)
- 15 January – George of Saxony, Crown prince of Saxony (born 1893)
- 14 February – David Hilbert, German mathematician (born 1862)
- 14 February – Hermann Friedrich Wilhelm Hinz, German archaeologist of Roman military structures (born 1887)
- 22 February – Hans Scholl, German White Rose resistance member (executed by Nazis) (born 1918)
- 22 February – Sophie Scholl, German White Rose resistance member (executed by Nazis) (born 1921)
- 26 February – Theodor Eicke, German Nazi official (born 1892)
- 10 March – Otto Modersohn, German painter (born 1865)
- 22 March – Hans Woellke, German shot putter (born 1911)
- 7 April – Jürgen von Alten, German stage and film actor (born 1903)
- 13 April – Oskar Schlemmer, German painter, sculptor and choreographer (born 1888)
- 24 April – Kurt von Hammerstein-Equord, German general (born 1878)
- 8 May – Otto Gessler, former Reich Minister of Defence during the Weimar Republic (born 1875)
- 15 May – Ludwig Roselius, German businessman (born 1874)
- 31 May – Helmut Kapp, German Gestapo official
- 13 July – Luz Long, German long jump athlete (born 1913)
- 21 July – Theodor von Guérard, German jurist and politician (born 1863)
- 5 August – Liane Berkowitz, German resistance fighter of the Red Orchestra organisation (born 1923)
- 2 September – Wilhelm Geiger, German Orientalist in the fields of Indo-Iranian languages (born 1856)
- 16 September – Robert Schmidt, German politician (born 1864)
- 22 September – Heinrich Waentig, German politician (born 1870)
- 23 September – Theodor Wolff, German writer and journalist (born 1868)
- 5 October – Ludwig von Estorff, German general (born 1859 in Germany)
- 15 December – Alfred Rosenberg, Nazi ideologue and Reich Minister for the Occupied Eastern Territories (born 1893)
- date unknown: Gottlob Walz, German diver (born 1881)
