= Wilhelm Weigand =

Wilhelm Weigand (13 March 1862, in Gissigheim, Baden-Württemberg – 20 December 1949, in Munich) was a German Neoromanticism and Realism period poet and writer. He was born Wilhelm Schnarrenberger, but on 2 May 1888 he took the maiden name of his grandmother.

== Distinctions ==
- Johann-Peter-Hebel Prize (1942)
- Honorary Citizen of the Community of Gissigheim

== Selected works ==
- Der Frankenthaler, novel (Leipzig, 1889)
- Sommer, poems (1894)
- Der zwiefache Eros, short stories (1896)
- Die Löffelstelze, novel (Tübingen, 1919)
- Der Hof Ludwigs XIV. Nach den Denkwürdigkeiten des Herzogs von Saint-Simon, history (c. 1922)
- Der graue Bote, short stories (Prague 1924)
- Die Fahrt zur Liebesinsel, novel (1928)
- Die Gärten Gottes, novel (1930)
- Helmhausen, novel (1938)
- Welt und Weg. Aus meinem Leben, autobiography (1940)
- Die rote Flut. Der Münchener Revolutions- und Rätespuk 1918/19, novel (Munich 1935)
- Der Ring.: Schicksale um ein Familienkleinod. (Tübingen 1947)
- Sebastian Scherzlgeigers Fahrt nach Kautzien – Auch ein Reiferoman, novel (1948)
