= Bruno Erhard Abegg =

Prussian politician (1803–1848)

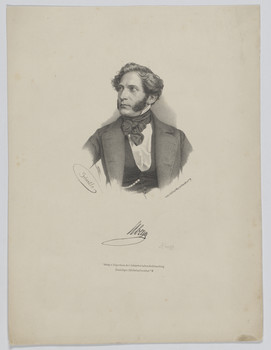
Portrait of the politician Bruno Abegg

Bruno Erhard Abegg (17 January 1803 – 16 December 1848) was a Prussian statesman.

Abegg was born in Elbing (Elbląg) in West Prussia, where his father was a merchant and Privy TradeCouncil.

Beginning in 1822, Abegg studied law at the universities of Heidelberg and Königsberg, and practised in Danzig and Königsberg (now Gdańsk and Kaliningrad, respectively). In 1831, he purchased a manor in Fischhausen (now Primorsk), becoming head of this district on 23 April 1833. He then moved to Königsberg, where he became superintendent of the police. In 1835, he was given the title of Privy Council of the Government in Berlin and sent to Breslau (Wrocław).

He became vice president of the Fünfzigerausschuss (Commission of the Fifty) in Frankfurt. Later, he was a member of the National Assembly in Berlin, where he died of an illness.

Abegg was a cousin of the criminalist Julius Friedrich Heinrich Abegg.

== Sources ==
- Allgemeine Deutsche Biographie - online version at Wikisource
