= Gertraud Gruber =

German beautician and businesswoman (1921–2022)

- Born: 24 May 1921; Munich, Bavaria, Germany
- Died: 12 March 2022 (aged 100); Rottach-Egern, Bavaria, Germany
- Occupations: Beautician; Businesswoman
- Website: https://www.gertraud-gruber.de/

Gertraud Gruber (24 May 1921 – 12 March 2022) was a German beautician and businesswoman who founded her own beauty company, Gertraud Gruber Kosmetik, as well as the first beauty farm in Europe in 1955 in Rottach-Egern, which specialised in holistic treatments. Gruber was awarded the Bavarian Order of Merit, the Cross of the Order of Merit of the Federal Republic of Germany and the Bayerischer Verfassungsorden in Gold.

== Early life and career ==
Gertraud Gruber was born on 24 May 1921 in Max-Weber-Platz, Munich. She studied expressive dance at the Isadora Duncan School in Munich. During World War II, she worked as a nurse.

In 1949, she married Josef Gruber, and the two moved to Rottach-Egern. Six years later, in 1955, Gruber opened a spa in a country house there which she named the Schoenheitsfarm (beauty farm), the first of its kind in Europe. Originally it only operated in one treatment room before expanding to fifty with thirty guest rooms by 1973. The farm offered body and facial treatments, in addition to physical activities including walking, water gymnastics and yoga. Gruber permitted only 100 people to stay at the farm at a time to better cater to their individual needs.

Gruber had sold her own cosmetics at the beauty farm, however, in 1996, she officially began her own beauty cosmetics company, Gertraud Gruber Kosmetik. Three years later, she founded the Gertraud and Josef Gruber Foundation.

== Later life and death ==
Gruber celebrated her 100th birthday on 24 May 2021. The following year, she received the Bayerischer Verfassungsorden in Gold. Gruber had previously also received the Bavarian Order of Merit and the Cross of the Order of Merit of the Federal Republic of Germany. She died that same year in Rottach-Egern on 12 March 2022, at the age of 100.
