= 1845 in Germany =

- Decades: 1820s; 1830s; 1840s; 1850s; 1860s
- See also: Other events of 1845; History of Germany • Timeline • Years

Events from the year 1845 in Germany.

== Incumbents ==
- King of Bavaria – Ludwig I
- King of Hanover – Ernest Augustus
- King of Prussia – Frederick William IV
- King of Saxony – Frederick Augustus II

== Events ==
- March 13 – The Violin Concerto by Felix Mendelssohn premieres in Leipzig, with Ferdinand David as soloist.
- October 19 – Richard Wagner's opera Tannhäuser debuts at the Dresden Royal Court Theater.

=== Date unknown ===
- Friedrich Engels' treatise The Condition of the Working Class in England is published in Leipzig as Die Lage der arbeitenden Klasse in England. convincing Marx that the working class could be the agent and instrument of the final revolution in history.
- Heinrich Hoffmann publishes a book (Lustige Geschichten und drollige Bilder), introducing his character, Struwwelpeter, in Germany.

== Births ==
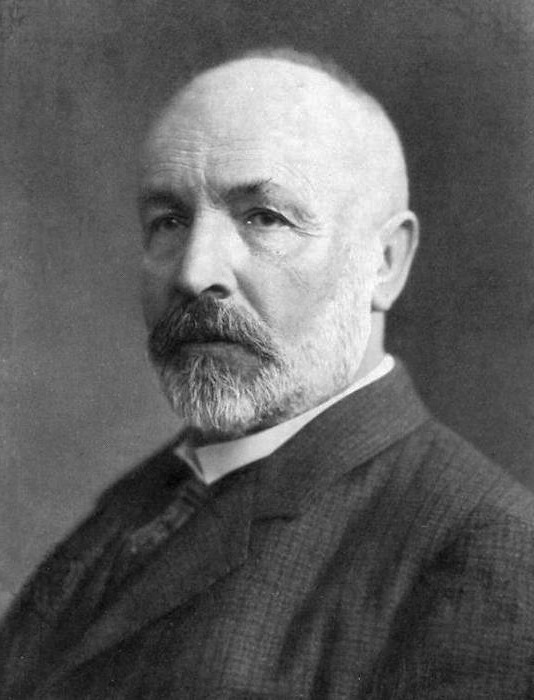
Georg Cantor

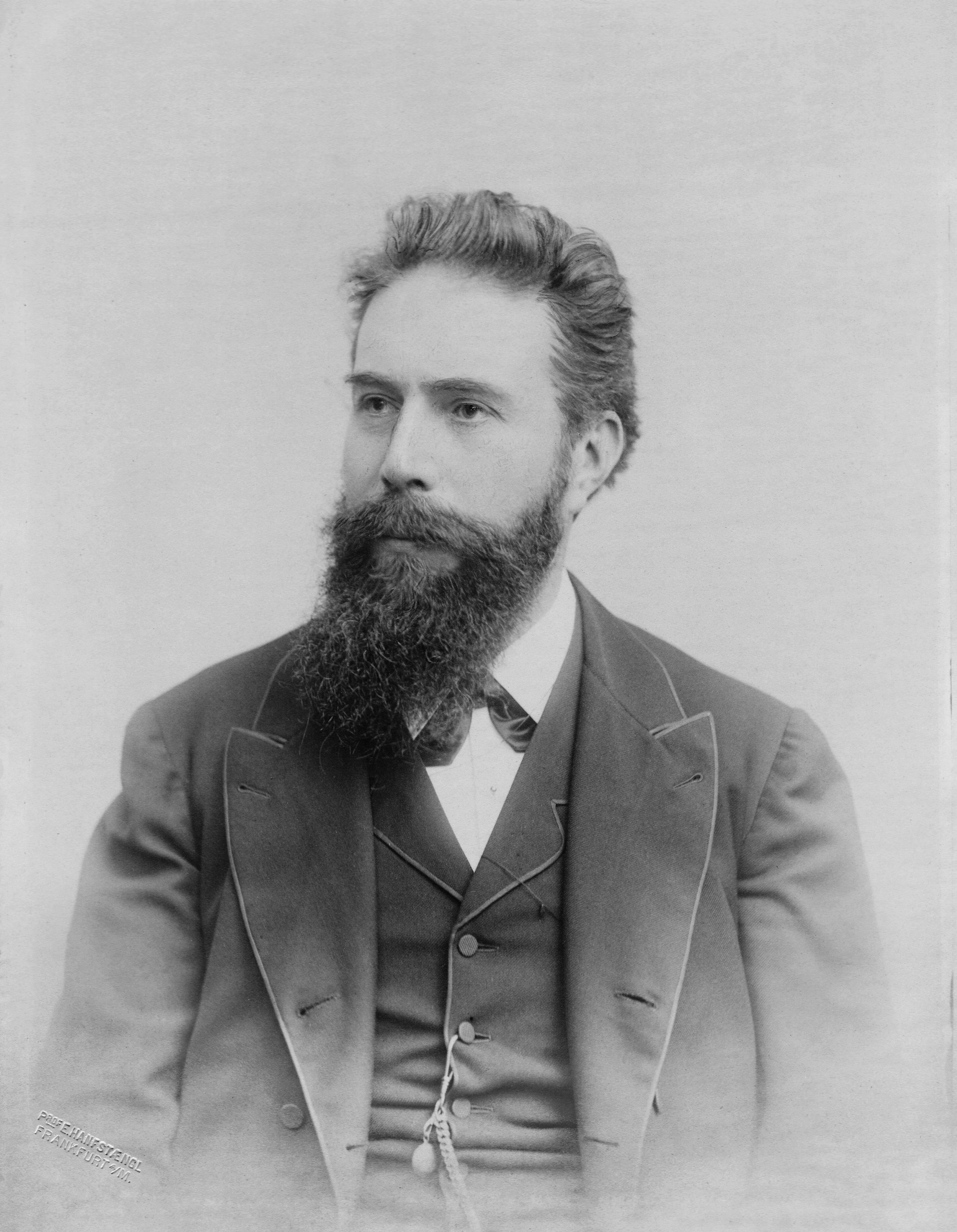
Wilhelm Conrad Röntgen

- January 7 – King Ludwig III of Bavaria (d. 1921)
- March 3 – Georg Cantor, German mathematician (d. 1918)
- March 27 – Wilhelm Röntgen, German physicist, Nobel Prize laureate (d. 1923)

== Deaths ==
- May 12- August Wilhelm Schlegel, German poet, translator and critic (b. 1767)
- July 12-Friedrich Ludwig Persius, German architect (b. 1803)

== Bibliography ==
Van der Kiste, John (2004), George III's Children (revised ed.), Stroud, United Kingdom: Sutton Publishing Ltd, ISBN 978-0-7509-3438-1
