= Cäsar Flaischlen =

German poet

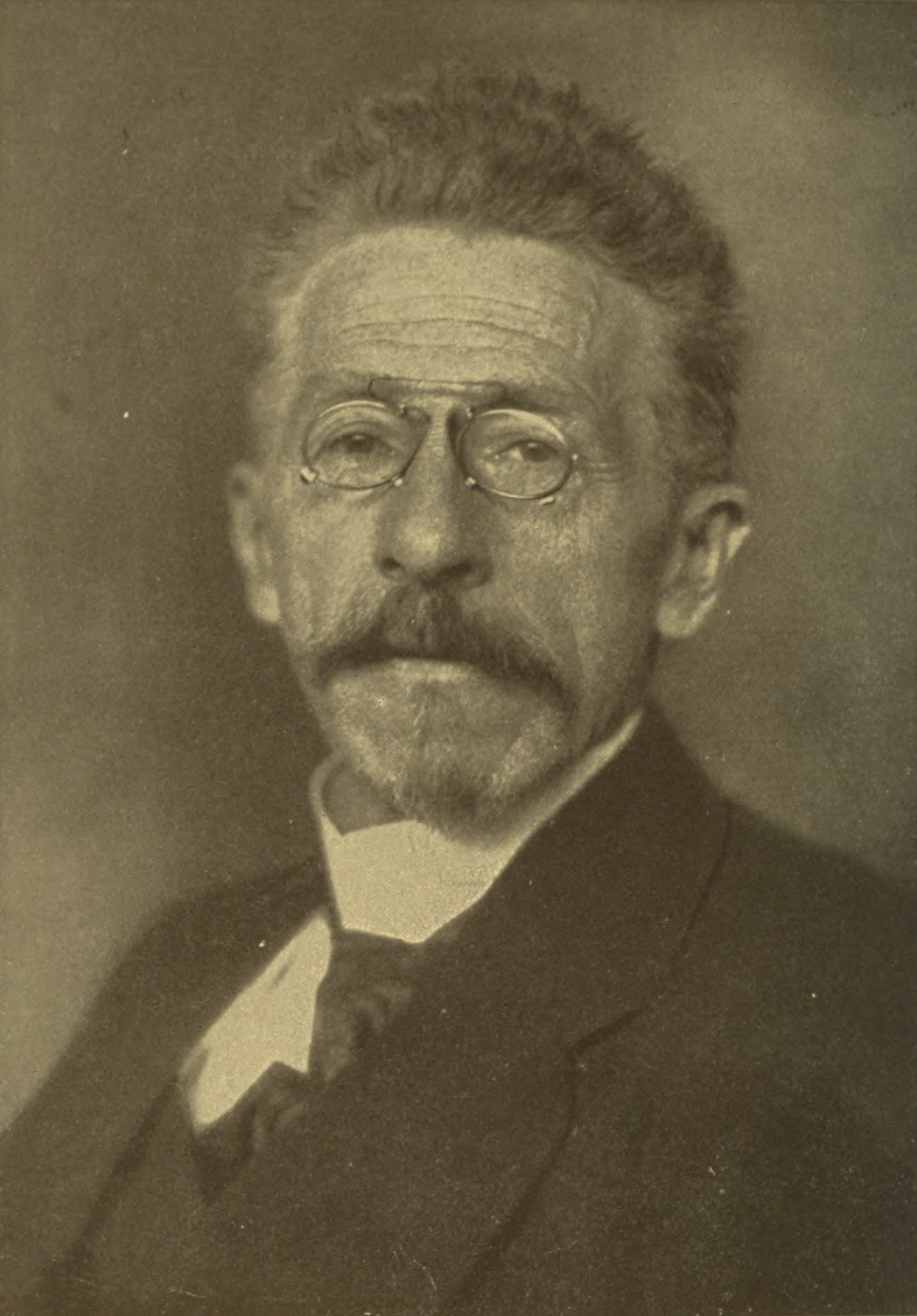
Photo by Alexander Binder, 1920

Cäsar Flaischlen (12 May 1864 – 16 October 1920) was a German poet. He is best known as the author of "Hab' Sonne im Herzen" ("Have Sunshine in Your Heart"), which has been translated into various languages. Composers such as Pauline Volkstein and Jórunn Viðar have set Flaischlen’s text to music.

== Have Sunshine in Your Heart ==
"Hab' Sonne im Herzen"

Hab' Sonne im Herzen, obs stürmt oder schneit
Ob der Himmel voll Wolken, die Erd voller Streit.
Hab' Sonne im Herzen, dann komme was mag,
das leuchtet voll Licht dir den dunkelsten Tag.

Hab' ein Lied auf den Lippen mit fröhlichem Klang
und macht auch des Alltags Gedränge dich bang!
Hab' ein Lied auf den Lippen, dann komme was mag,
das hilft dir verwinden den einsamsten Tag!

Hab' ein Wort auch für andre in Sorg' und in Pein,
und sag, was dich selber so frohgemut lässt sein:
Hab' ein Lied auf den Lippen, verlier nie den Mut,
hab' Sonne im Herzen, und alles wird gut.
