= 1846 in Germany =

- Decades: 1820s; 1830s; 1840s; 1850s; 1860s
- See also: Other events of 1846; History of Germany • Timeline • Years

Events from the year 1846 in Germany.

== Incumbents ==
- King of Bavaria – Ludwig I.
- King of Hanover – Ernest Augustus
- King of Prussia – Frederick William IV
- King of Saxony – Frederick Augustus II

== Births ==
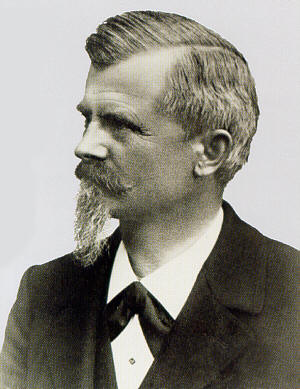
Wilhelm Maybach

- February 9 – Wilhelm Maybach, German automobile designer (d. 1929)
- March 24 – Karl von Bülow, German field marshal (d. 1921)
- May 20 – Alexander von Kluck, German general (d. 1934)
- December 17 – Max von Hausen, German general (d. 1922)

== Deaths ==
- March 17 – Friedrich Bessel, German mathematician and astronomer (b. 1784)

== Bibliography ==
Van der Kiste, John (2004), George III's Children (revised ed.), Stroud, United Kingdom: Sutton Publishing Ltd, ISBN 978-0-7509-3438-1
