= 1847 in Germany =

- Decades: 1820s; 1830s; 1840s; 1850s; 1860s
- See also: Other events of 1847; History of Germany • Timeline • Years

Events from the year 1847 in Germany.

== Incumbents ==
- King of Bavaria – Ludwig I.
- King of Hanover – Ernest Augustus
- King of Prussia – Frederick William IV
- King of Saxony – Frederick Augustus II

== Event ==
- 12 October – German inventors and industrialists Werner von Siemens and Johann Georg Halske found Siemens & Halske to develop the electrical telegraph.

== Births ==
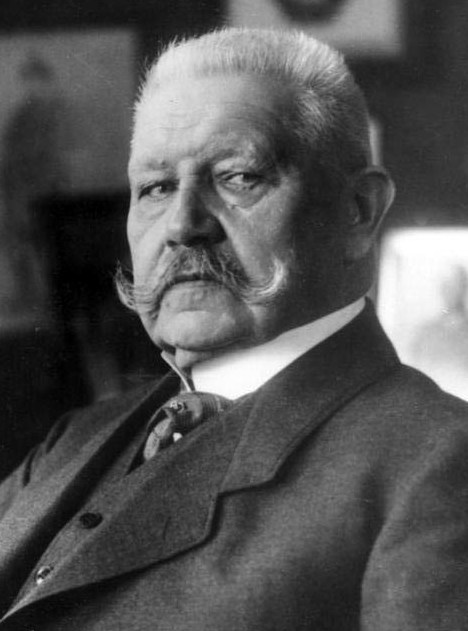
- Paul von Hindenburg
  4 February – Remus von Woyrsch, German field marshal (d. 1920)
- 16 February – Philipp Scharwenka, Polish-German composer (d. 1917)
- 27 March – -Otto Wallach, German chemist, Nobel Prize laureate (d. 1931)
- 20 July – Max Liebermann, German painter, printmaker (d. 1935)
- 25 July – Paul Langerhans, German pathologist, biologist (d. 1888)
- 2 October – Paul von Hindenburg, German field marshal, President of Germany (d. 1934)

== Deaths ==
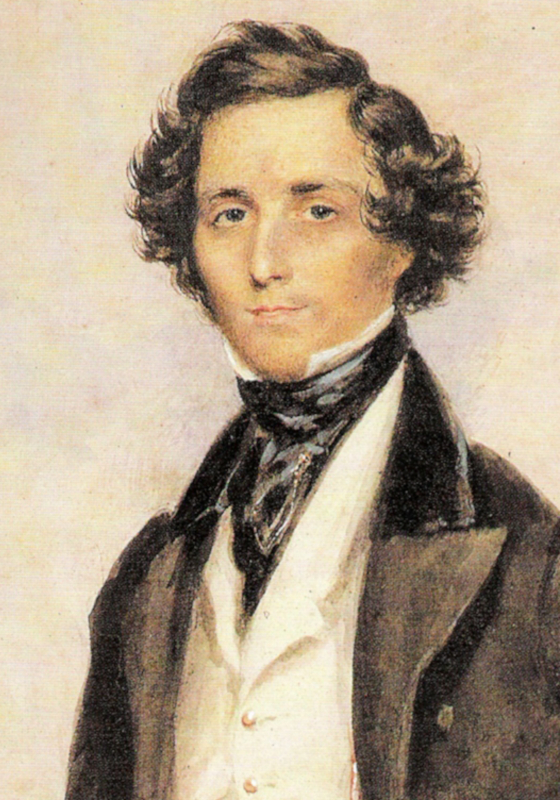
Felix Mendelssohn

- 14 May – Fanny Mendelssohn, German composer, pianist (b. 1805)
- 16 July – Karl Friedrich Burdach, German physiologist (b. 1776)
- 22 October – Henriette Herz, German salonnière (b. 1764)
- 4 November – Felix Mendelssohn, German composer (b. 1809)
