= 1843 in Germany =

- Decades: 1820s; 1830s; 1840s; 1850s; 1860s
- See also: Other events of 1843; History of Germany • Timeline • Years

Events from the year 1843 in Germany.

== Incumbents ==
- Kingdom of Prussia –
  - Monarch – Friedrich Wilhelm IV (1840–1861)
  - Chief Minister – Ludwig Gustav von Thile (1841–1848)
- Kingdom of Bavaria
  - Monarch – Ludwig I (1825–1848)
  - Prime Minister – Karl von Abel (1837–1847)
- Kingdom of Saxony – Frederick Augustus (1836–1854)
- Kingdom of Hanover – Ernest Augustus (1837–1851)
- Kingdom of Württemberg – William (1816–1864)

== Events ==
- The Berlin Peace Column is a column located in Mehringplatz in Berlin, Germany. Designed by Christian Gottlieb Cantian and erected in 1843.
- Ohm's acoustic law was proposed by German physicist Georg Ohm.
- The University of Music and Theatre Leipzig founded in 1843 by Felix Mendelssohn.

== Births ==
- January 8 – Karl Eduard Heusner, Vice-Admiral of the German Imperial Navy (d. 1891)
- January 11 – Adolf Eberle, German painter (d. 1914)
- January 17 – Anton Thraen, German astronomer (d. 1902)
- January 22 – Friedrich Blass, German scholar (d. 1907)
- January 25 – Hermann Schwarz, German mathematician (d. 1921)
- January 26 – Erdmann Encke, German sculptor (d. 1896)
- February 25 – Karl Gussow, German painter (d. 1907)
- March 12 – Ludwig Dahn, German actor (d. 1898)
- March 31 – Bernhard Förster, German teacher (d. 1889)
- April 2 – Karl Koester, German pathologist (d. 1904)
- April 11 – Johannes Minckwitz, German chess player (d. 1901)
- April 21 – Walther Flemming, German biologist (d. 1905)
- May 4 – Bianka Blume, German opera singer (d. 1896)
- May 8 – Rudolf Mosse, German publisher (d. 1920)
- May 9 – Anton von Werner, German painter (d. 1915)
- May 22 – Adolf Aron Baginsky, German professor of diseases (d. 1918)
- May 25 – Paul Scheffer-Boichorst, German historian (d. 1902)
- May 30 – Louis Boehmer, German-American agronomist (d. 1896)
- June 4 – Charles Conrad Abbott, German archaeologist (d. 1919)
- June 9 – Wilhelm Dames, German paleontologist (d. 1898)
- June 13 – Adolf Neuendorff, German American composer (d. 1897)
- June 14 – Richard Otto Zöpffel, Baltic German church historian and theologian (d. 1891)
- June 23 – Otto Kuntze, German botanist (d. 1907)
  - June 23 – Paul Heinrich von Groth (died 1927), German mineralogist
- June 24 – Andreas Ascharin, Baltic-German chessmaster (d. 1896)
- June 25 – Prince Frederick of Hohenzollern-Sigmaringen, Member of the Hohenzollern Sigmaringen family (d. 1904)
- June 28 – Julius Runge, German landscape artist (d. 1922)

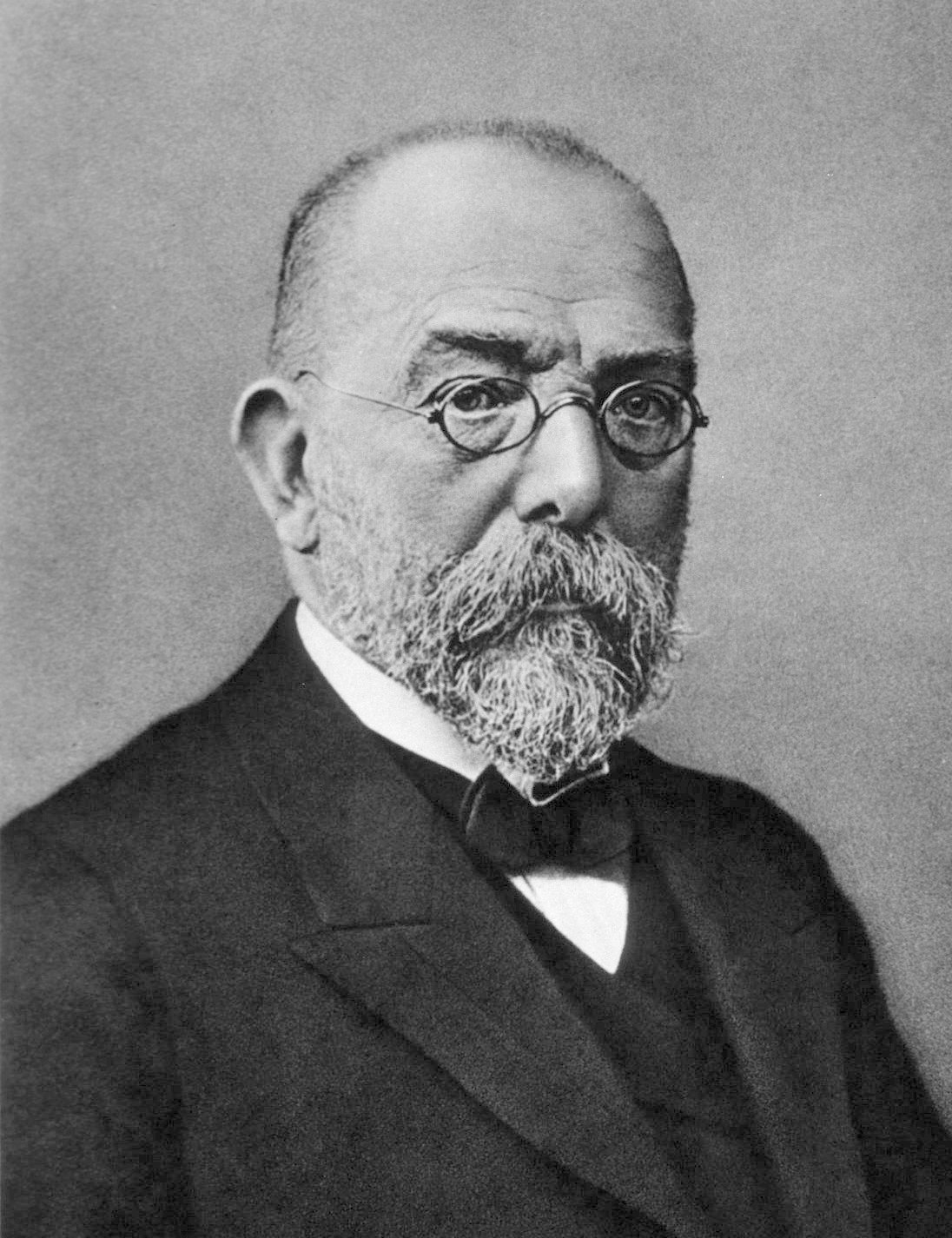
Robert Koch

- July 29 – Johannes Schmidt, German linguist (d. 1901)
- August 9 – Adolf Mayer, German agricultural chemist (d. 1942)
- August 11 – Louis Gathmann, German American inventor (d. 1917)
- August 12 – Colmar Freiherr von der Goltz, Prussian field marshal (d. 1916)
- August 18 – Moritz Brasch, German philosopher (d. 1895)
- August 24 – Ernst Wülcker, German archivist and lexicographer (d. 1895)
- August 26 – Victor Gardthausen, German ancient historian (d. 1925)
- August 27 – Wilhelm Wisser, German dialectologist (d. 1935)
- August 30 – Carl Theodor Albrecht, German astronomer (d. 1915)
- August 31 – Georg von Hertling, Chancellor of Germany (d. 1919)
- September 5 – Friedrich Reusch, German sculptor (d. 1906)
- September 7 – Otto von Diederichs, German admiral (d. 1918)
- September 11 – Adolf Wach, German jurist (d. 1926)
- September 20 – Julius Lessing, German art historian (d. 1908)
- September 24 – Carl Constantin Platen, German physician (d. 1899)
- October 16 – Johann Friedrich Ahlfeld, German obstetrician and gynecologist (d. 1929)November 7 – Heinrich Friedrich Weber, German physicist (d. 1912)
- November 8 – Moritz Pasch, German mathematician (d. 1930)
- November 13 – Friedrich Albin Hoffmann, German internist (d. 1924)
- November 14 – Theodor Wilhelm Engelmann, German botanist (d. 1909)
- November 15 – Joseph König (chemist), German chemist (d. 1930)
- December 11 – Robert Koch, German physician, recipient of the Nobel Prize in Physiology or Medicine (d. 1910)

== Deaths ==
- March 27 – Karl Salomo Zachariae von Lingenthal, German jurist (b. 1769)
- June 7 – Friedrich Hölderlin, German writer (b. 1770)
- July 2 – Samuel Hahnemann, German physician (b. 1755)

== Bibliography ==
Van der Kiste, John (2004), George III's Children (revised ed.), Stroud, United Kingdom: Sutton Publishing Ltd, ISBN 978-0-7509-3438-1
