= 2014 in Germany =

- Decades: 1990s; 2000s; 2010s; 2020s; 2030s
- See also: Other events of 2014; History of Germany; Timeline; Years

The following is a list of events from the year 2014 in Germany.

== Incumbents ==
=== Federal level ===
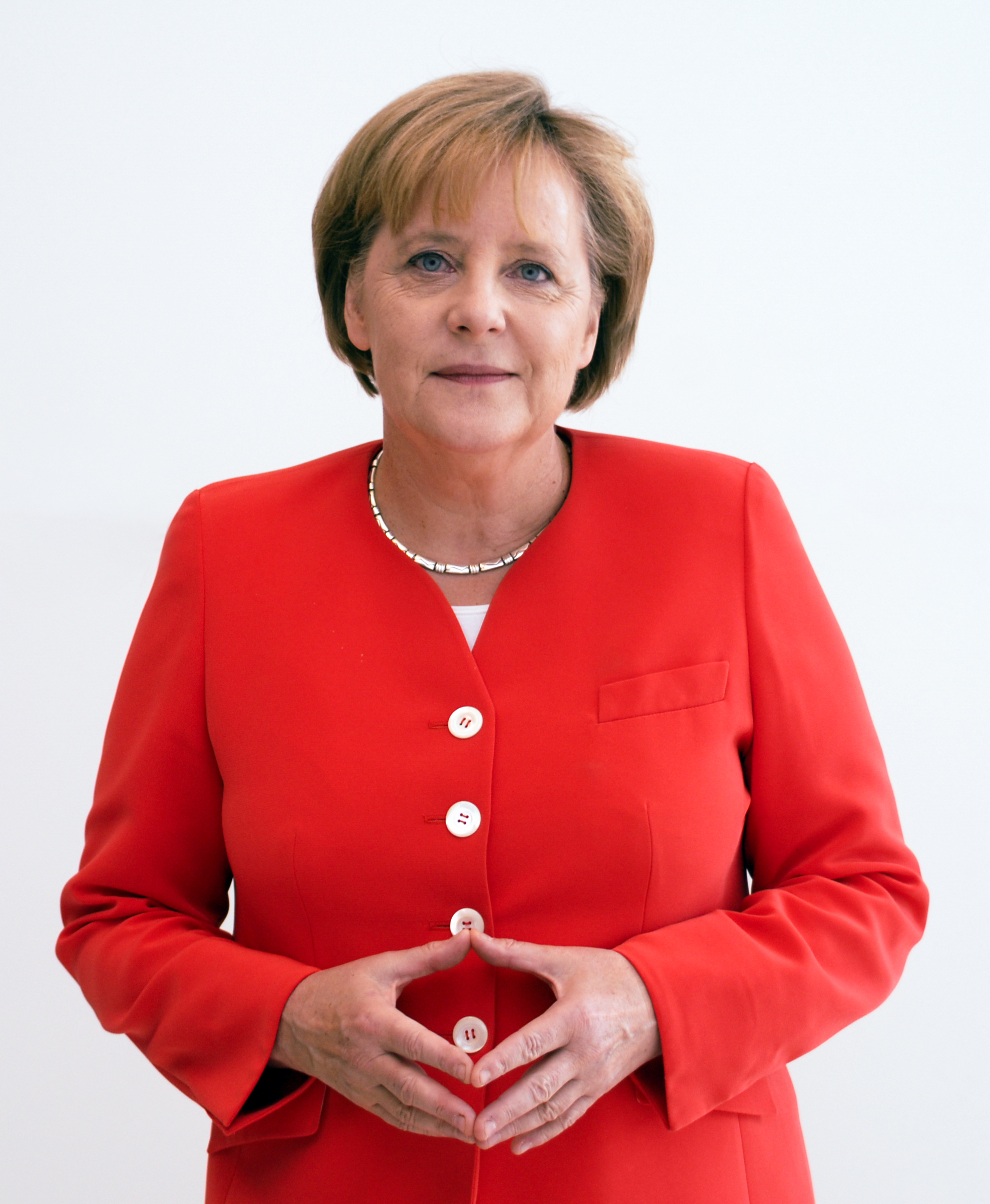
Angela Merkel

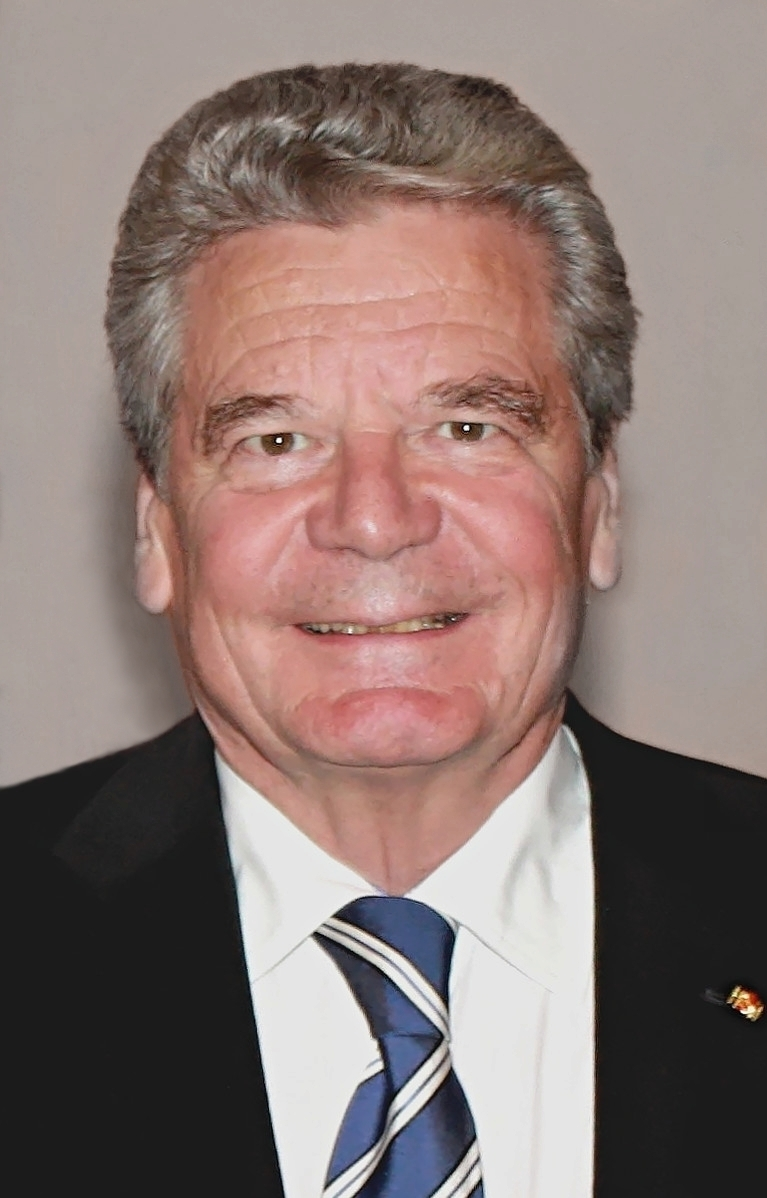
Joachim Gauck

- President: Joachim Gauck
- Chancellor: Angela Merkel

=== State level ===
- Minister-President of Baden-Wuerttemberg – Winfried Kretschmann
- Minister-President of Bavaria – Horst Seehofer
- Mayor of Berlin – Klaus Wowereit
- Minister-President of Brandenburg – Dietmar Woidke
- Mayor of Bremen – Jens Boehrnsen
- Mayor of Hamburg – Olaf Scholz
- Minister-President of Hesse – Volker Bouffier
- Minister-President of Mecklenburg-Vorpommern – Erwin Sellering
- Minister-President of Niedersachsen – Stephan Weil
- Minister-President of North Rhine-Westphalia – Hannelore Kraft
- Minister-President of Rhineland-Palatinate – Malu Dreyer
- Minister-President of Saarland – Annegret Kramp-Karrenbauer
- Minister-President of Saxony – Stanislaw Tillich
- Minister-President of Saxony-Anhalt – Reiner Haseloff
- Minister-President of Schleswig-Holstein – Torsten Albig
- Minister-President of Thuringia – Christine Lieberknecht

== Events ==
=== January ===
- January – Bavarian Film Awards in Munich
- January – German Snooker Masters in Berlin
- 6 January – 100th birthday of German art dealer Heinz Berggruen
- 28–1 January – 200th deathday of German king Karl der Große
- 29 January – 200th deathday of German philosoph Johann Gottlieb Fichte

=== February ===
- 6–16 February – 64th Berlin International Film Festival in Berlin
- February – Germany in the Eurovision Song Contest 2014

=== March ===
- March – CeBIT in Hanover
- March – ITB Berlin in Berlin
- March – Leipzig Book Fair in Leipzig
- 7 March – 300th year of Treaty of Rastatt

=== April ===
- April – Hanover Messe in Hanover
- April – Deutscher Filmpreis in Berlin

=== May ===
- 24 May – 100th birthday of German actress Lilli Palmer
- 25 May –
  - 2014 European Parliament election in Germany
  - Udo Voigt is elected as the NDP party's first Member of the European Parliament.

=== June ===
- June – Kiel Week in Kiel

=== July ===
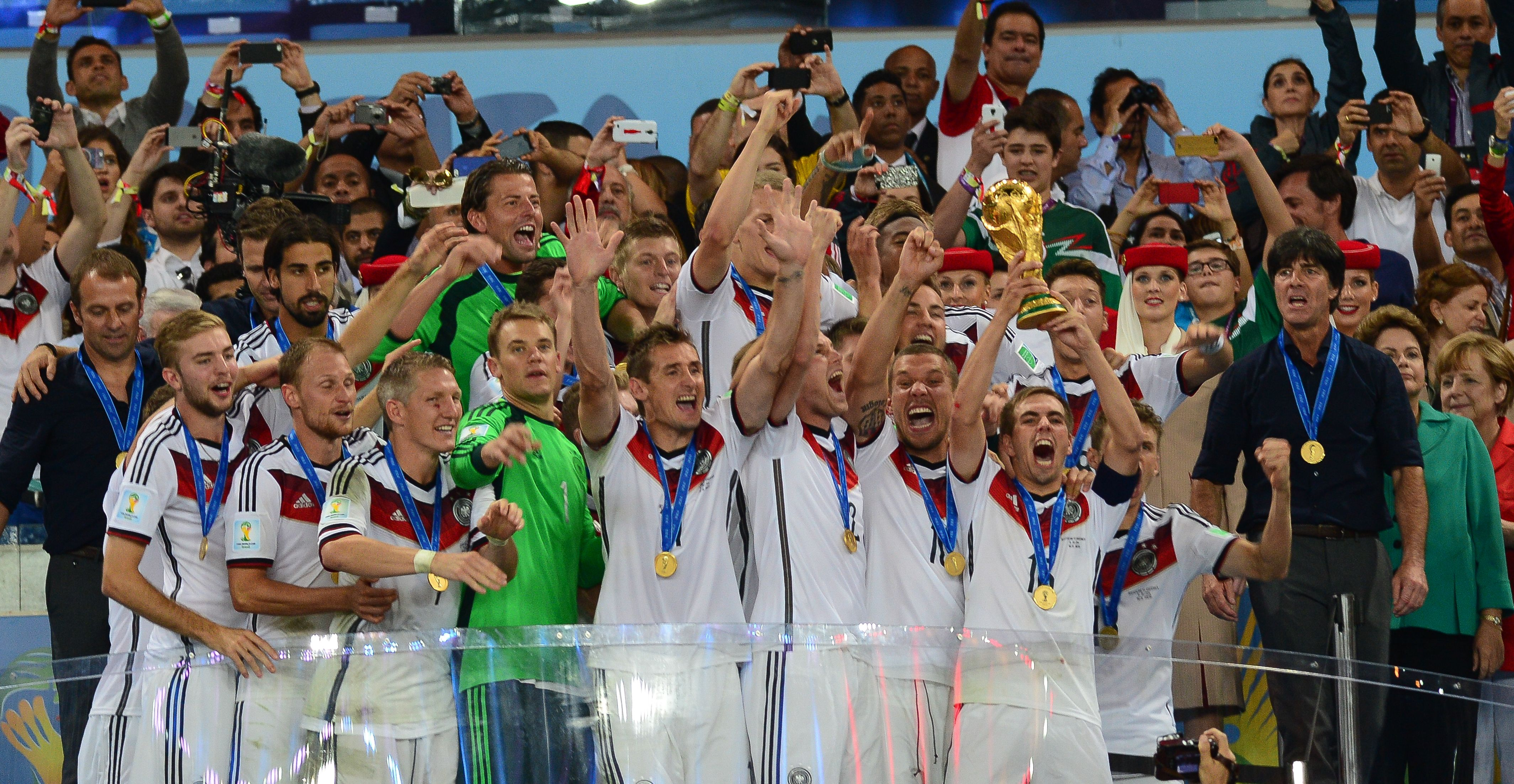
Germany national football team wins in Brazil

- 13 July – The Germany national team becomes world champion in Brazil.
- 18 July
  - 4 Germans are confirmed as among the 300 people on board killed in Malaysia Airlines Flight MH17 with 193 Dutch nationals in Eastern Ukraine near Russian border.
  - 26 2014 IPC Shooting World Championships
- 28 July – 100th year of start World War I

=== August ===
- August – Hanse Sail in Rostock
- 13–24 August – 2014 European Aquatics Championships
- 15 August – Reopening of Hildesheim Cathedral after four and a half years of renovation.
- 27 August – 100th birthday of German actress Heidi Kabel
- August–September – Internationale Funkausstellung Berlin in Berlin

=== September ===
- September – "Shariah Police" incident in Wuppertal, Germany (2014), Hardline Salafist Muslims patrolled the streets of Wuppertal, a city in the west of Germany, to "influence and recruit young people", according to local police. Dressed in bright orange reflective vests with "Shariah Police" printed on the back, the male patrollers loitered around discotheques and gambling houses, telling passers-by to refrain from gambling and alcohol. Wuppertal's police have pressed charges.
- September – ILA Berlin Air Show in Berlin
- September – Gamescom in Cologne
- September – photokina 2014 in Cologne
- September – Frankfurt Motor Show in Frankfurt
- 26 September – 100th deathday of German painter August Macke
- September – October – Oktoberfest in Munich

=== October ===
- October – Frankfurt Book Fair

=== November ===
- 5 November – 600th year of start of Council of Constance

== Deaths ==
=== January ===
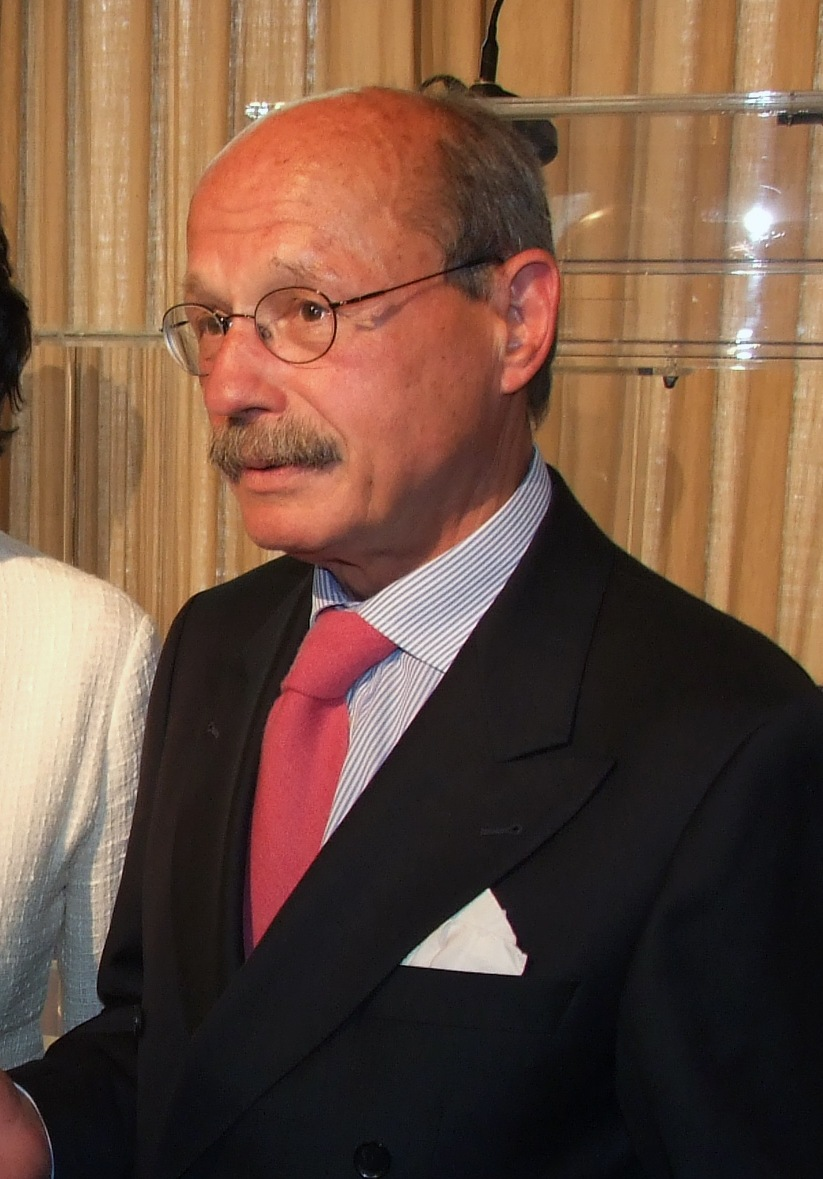
Dirk Sager

- 2 January
  - Thomas Kurzhals, 60, German composer (b. 1953)
  - Dirk Sager, 73, German journalist (b. 1940)
- 9 January – Winfried Hassemer, 74, German criminal law scholar (b. 1940)
- 22 January – Fred Bertelmann, 88, German singer (b. 1925)
- 31 January – Gundi Busch, 78, German figure skater (b. 1935)

=== February ===
- 2 February – Gerd Albrecht, 78, German conductor (b. 1935)
- 4 February – Hubert Luthe, 86, German bishop of Roman Catholic Church (b. 1927)
- 6 February – Peter Philipp, 42, German writer and comedian (b. 1971)
- 17 February – Peter Florin, 92, German politician and diplomat (b. 1921)
- 18 February – Bernd Noske, 67, German singer and drummer (b. 1946)
- 24 February – Günter Reisch, 86, German film director and screenwriter (b. 1927)
- 25 February – Wilfried Brauer, 76, German computer scientist (b. 1937)

=== March ===
- 1 March – Eckart Höfling, 77, German Roman Catholic priest in Brazil (b. 1936)
- 7 March – Heiko Bellmann, 63, German biologist and zoologist (b. 1950)
- 9 March – Justus Pfaue, 72, German author and director (b. 1942)
- 14 March – Werner Rackwitz, 84, German opera director (b. 1929)
- 17 March – Mareike Carrière, 59, German actress (b. 1954)

=== April ===
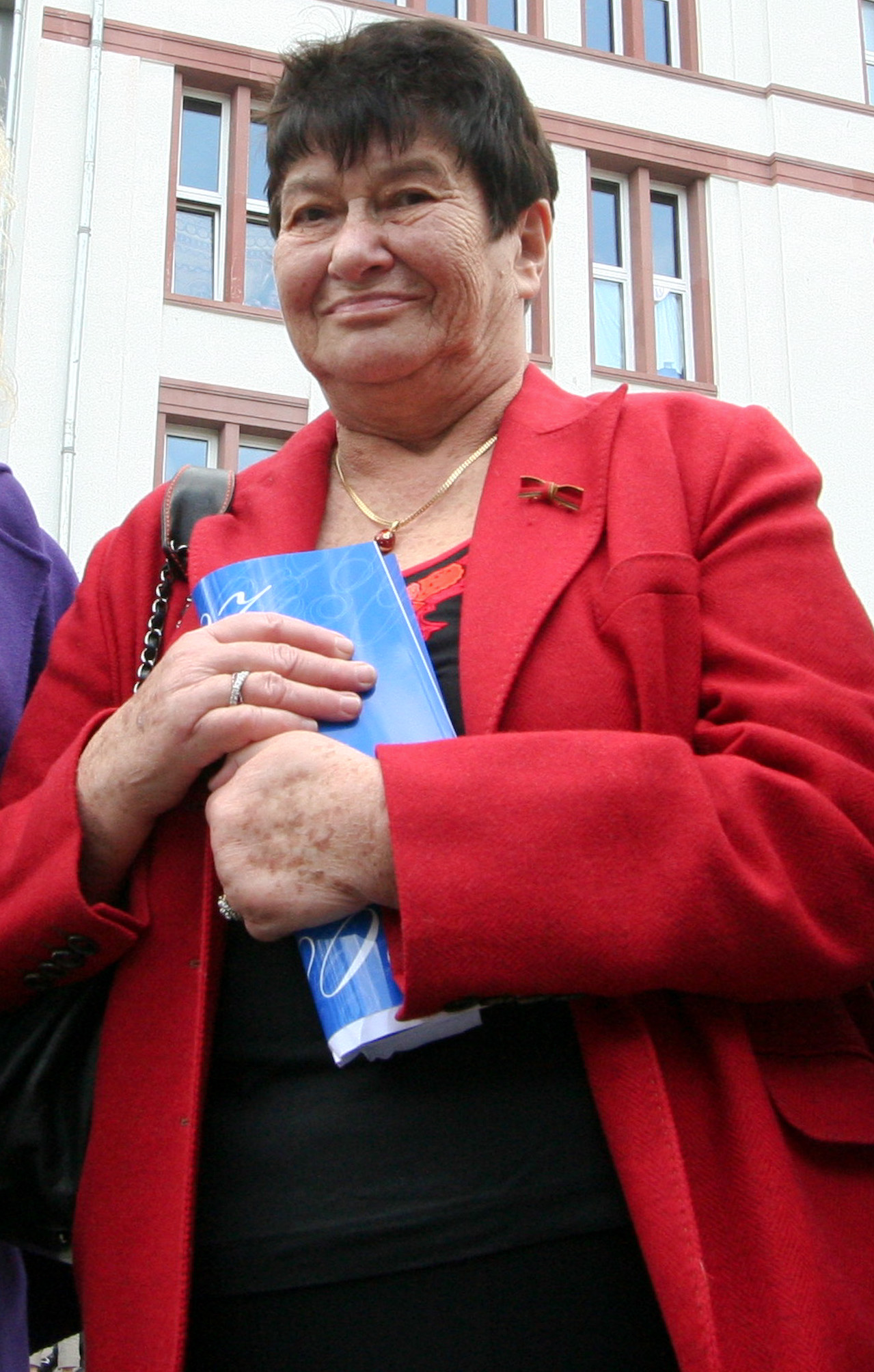
Stefanie Zweig

- 3 April – Michael Prinz von Preußen, 74, German writer and royalty (b. 1940)
- 4 April – Klaus Meyer, 76, German footballer (b. 1937)
- 8 April
  - Herbert Schoen, 84, German footballer (b. 1929)
  - Karlheinz Deschner, 89, German writer (b. 1924)
- 11 April
  - Helga Mees, 76, German fencer (b. 1937)
  - Eduard Gaugler, 85, German economist (b. 1928)
- 21 April – Ilse von Bredow, 91, German writer (b. 1922)
- 22 April – Werner Potzernheim, 87, German cyclist (b. 1927)
- 25 April – Stefanie Zweig, 81, German writer (b. 1932)
- 26 April – Adolf Seilacher, 89, German palaeontologist (b. 1925)

=== May ===
- 1 May
  - Heinz Schenk, 89, German television presenter (b. 1924)
  - Georg Stollenwerk, 83, German footballer and trainer (b. 1930)
- 6 May – Cornelius Gurlitt, 81, German art collector (b. 1932)
- 14 May – Wolfgang Heyl, politician (b. 1921)
- 16 May – Rolf Boysen, 94, German actor (b. 1920)
- 23 May – Richard Kolitsch, 24, German footballer (b. 1989)
- 30 May – Michael Szameit, 63, German writer (b. 1950)

=== June ===
- 4 June – Kurt Conradi, 89, German actor (b. 1924)
- 6 June – Hermann Bahlsen, 86, German manager (b. 1927)
- 9 June – Reinhard Höppner, 65, German politician (b. 1948)
- 12 June – Frank Schirrmacher, 54, German journalist and essayist (b. 1959)
- 21 June – Johannes Strassmann, 29, German poker player (b. 1985)
- 22 June – Werner Biskup, 72, German football player (b. 1942)
- 28 June – Peter Klose, 60, German politician (b. 1953)

=== July ===
- 5 July – Hans-Ulrich Wehler, German historian (b. 1931)
- 7 July – Horst Bollmann, German actor (b. 1925)
- 14 July – Karl Düsterberg, 97, German manager (b. 1917)
- 15 July – Edda Buding, 77, German tennis player (b. 1936)
- 16 July – Karl Albrecht, 94, German manager (b. 1920)
- 21 July – Hans-Peter Kaul, 70, German judge (b. 1943)
- 30 July – Harun Farocki, 70, German film director (b. 1944)

=== August ===
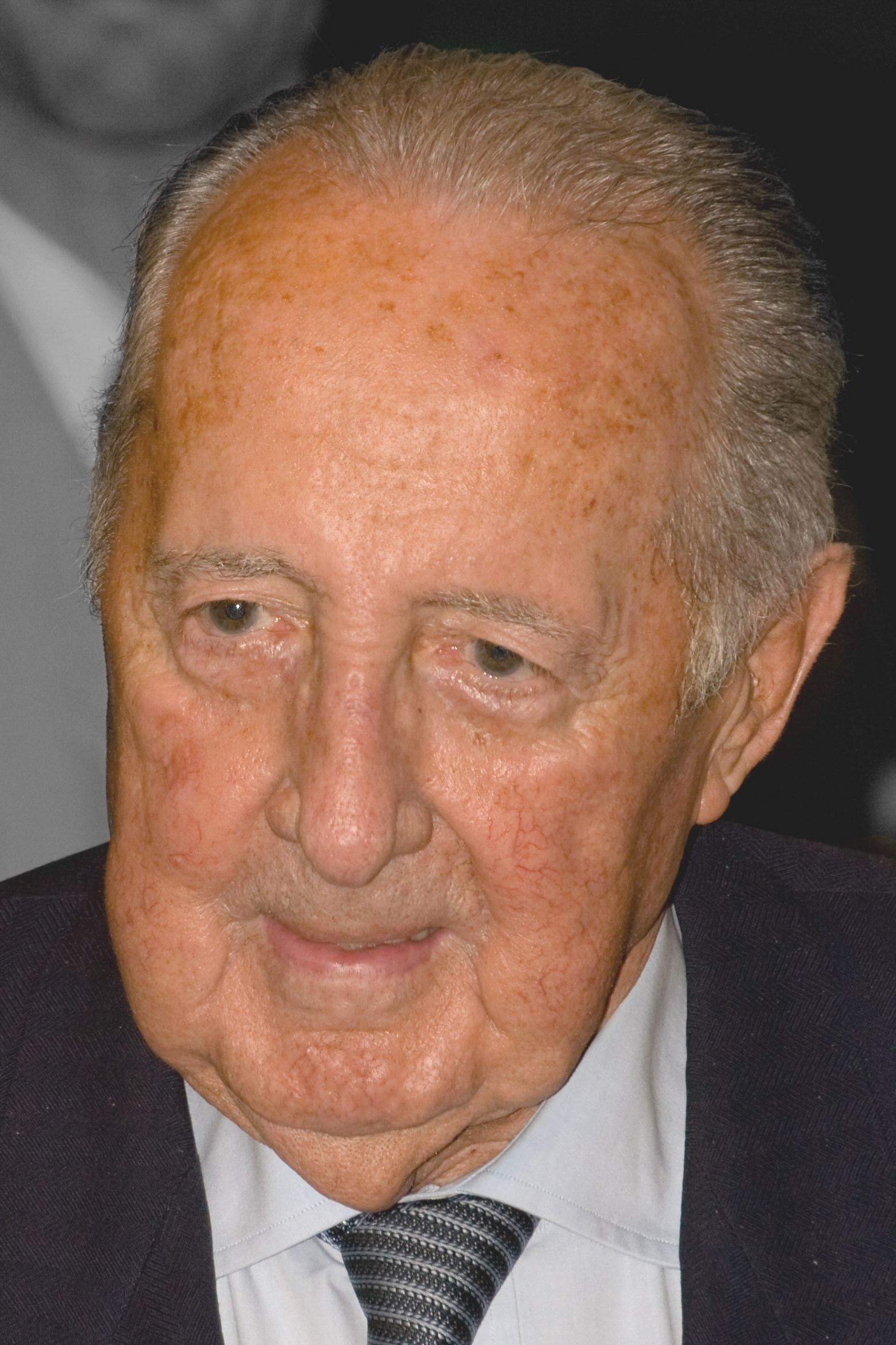
Peter Scholl-Latour

- 1 August – Gert von Paczensky, 88, German journalist (b. 1925)
- 2 August – Otmar Hornbach, 84, German manager (b. 1930)
- 5 August – Elfriede Brüning, 103, German writer (b. 1910)
- 10 August – Günter Junghans, 73, German actor (b. 1941)
- 15 August – Hermann Weber, 92, German historian (b. 1928)
- 16 August – Peter Scholl-Latour, 90, German journalist (b. 1924)
- 20 August
  - Klaus Zapf, 62, German manager (b. 1952)
  - Gert Schaefer, 58, German actor (b. 1955)
- 21 August – Werner Liersch, 81, German writer (b. 1932)
- 24 August – Walter Pradt, 65, German football player (b. 1949)
- 25 August – Karl Ganzhorn, 93, German physicist (b. 1921)
- 27 August – Benno Pludra, 88, German writer (b. 1925)

=== September ===
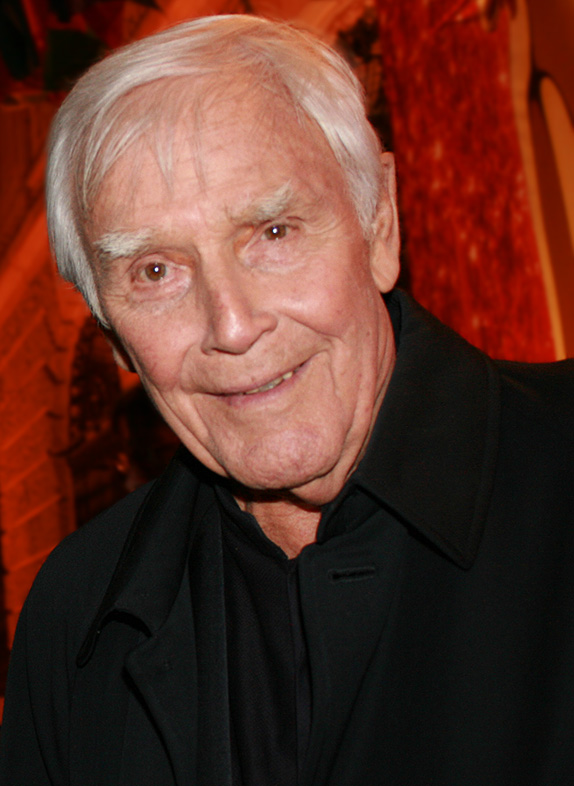
Joachim Fuchsberger

- 1 September – Gottfried John, 72, German actor (b. 1942)
- 4 September – Wolfhart Pannenberg, 85, German theologian (b. 1928)
- 11 September – Joachim Fuchsberger, German actor and television moderator (b. 1927)
- 20 September – Anton-Günther, Duke of Oldenburg (b. 1923)
- 27 September – Yvonne-Ruth Killmer (b. 1921)

=== October ===
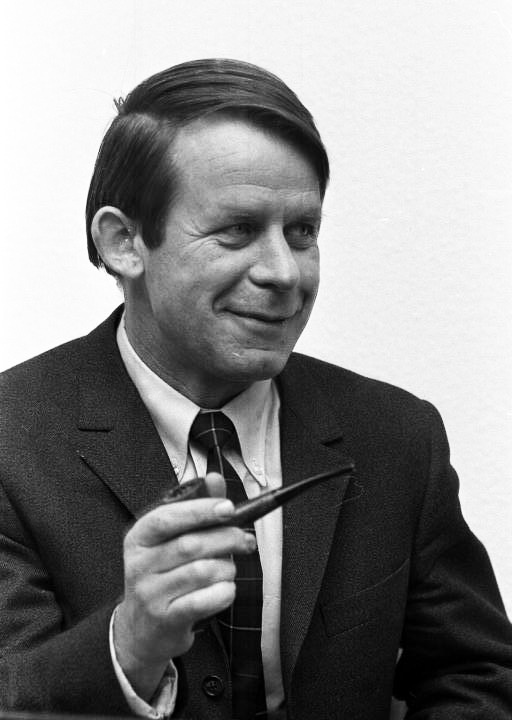
Siegfried Lenz

- 3 October – Peer Augustinski, 74, German actor (b. 1940)
- 7 October – Siegfried Lenz, 88, German writer (b. 1926)

=== November ===
- 1 November – Klaus Bölling, 86, German publisher (b. 1928)
- 8 November – Hannes Hegen, 89, German cartoonist and illustrator (b. 1925)
- 13 November – Alexander Grothendieck, 86, German-born mathematician (b. 1928)
- 19 November – Mike Nichols, 83, German-born American director (b. 1931)

=== December ===
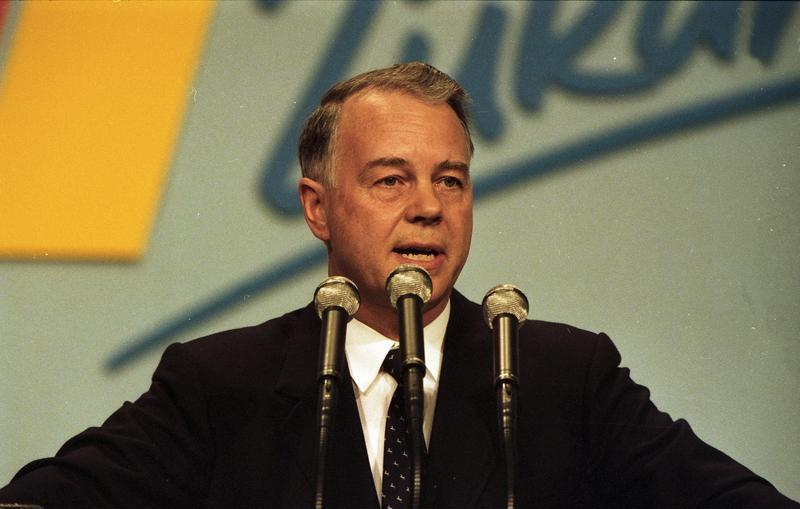
Ernst Albrecht

- 9 December – Karl Otto Pöhl, 85, German economist (b. 1929)
- 10 December – Ralph Giordano, 89, German writer (b. 1923)
- 13 December – Ernst Albrecht, 84, German politician (b. 1930)
- 14 December – Alois Graf von Waldburg-Zeil, German politician (b. 1933)
- 22 December – Fritz Sdunek, 67, German boxing trainer and amateur boxer (b. 1947)
- 29 December – André Wohllebe, German canoeist(b. 1962)
- 30 December – Luise Rainer, 104, German born actress (b. 1910)

== See also ==
- 2014 in German television
