= 2013 in Germany =

- Decades: 1990s; 2000s; 2010s; 2020s
- See also: Other events of 2013; History of Germany • Timeline • Years

The following is a list of events from the year 2013 in Germany.

== Incumbents ==
=== Federal level ===
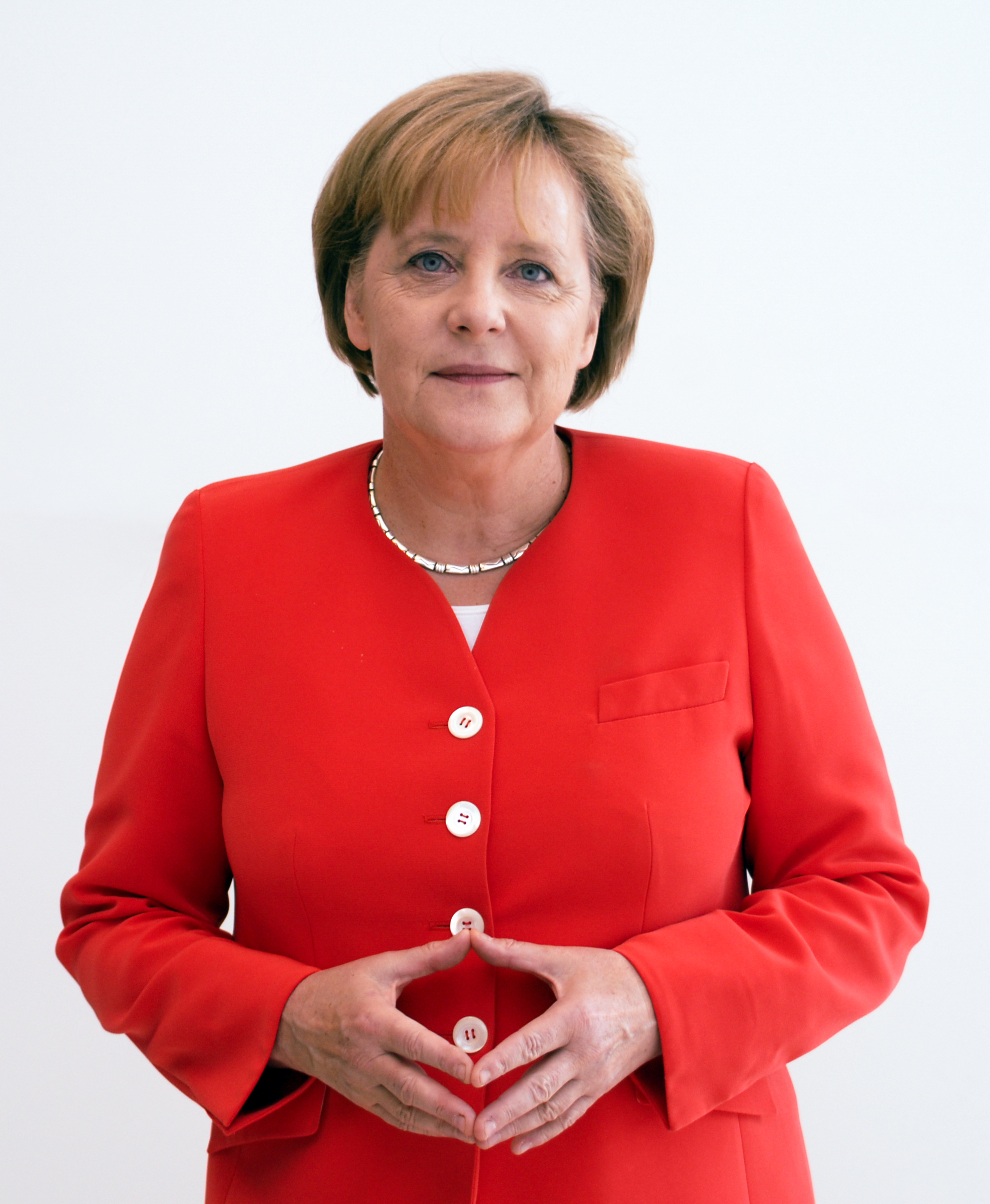
Angela Merkel

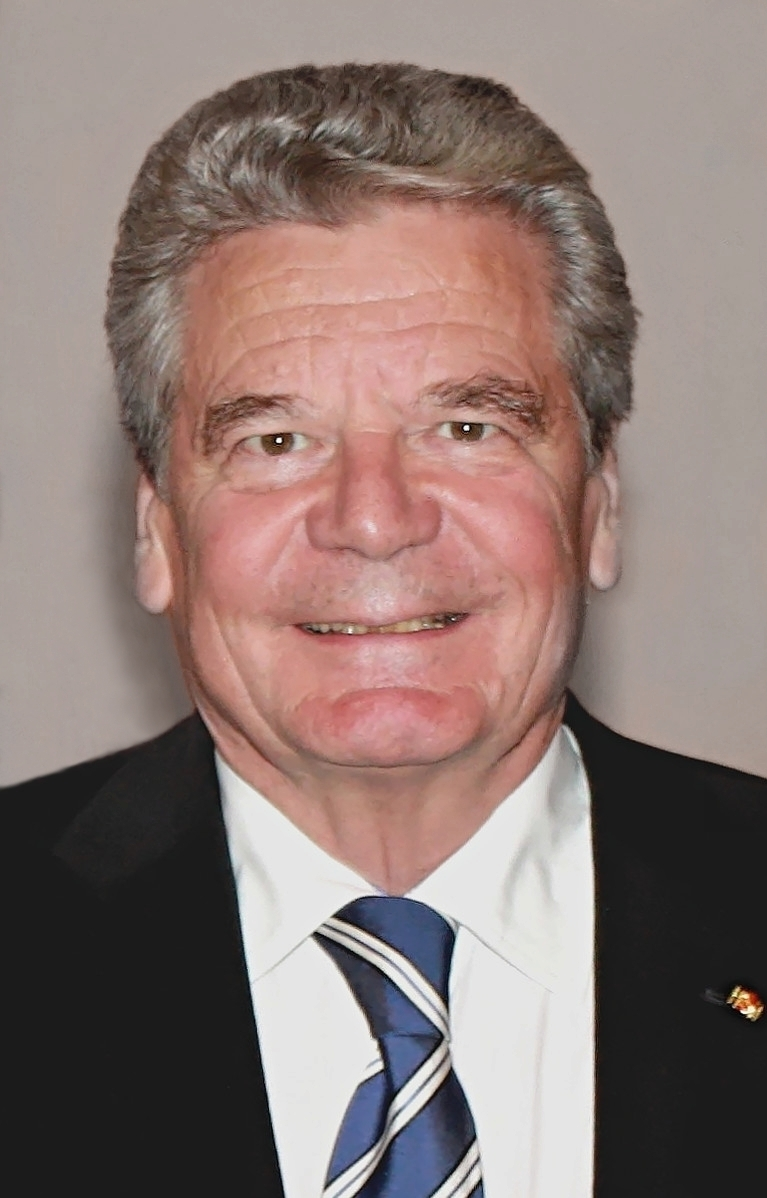
Joachim Gauck

- President: Joachim Gauck
- Chancellor: Angela Merkel

=== State level ===
- Minister-President of Baden-Wuerttemberg – Winfried Kretschmann
- Minister-President of Bavaria – Horst Seehofer
- Mayor of Berlin – Klaus Wowereit
- Minister-President of Brandenburg – Matthias Platzeck
- Mayor of Bremen – Jens Boehrnsen
- Mayor of Hamburg – Olaf Scholz
- Minister-President of Hesse – Volker Bouffier
- Minister-President of Mecklenburg-Vorpommern – Erwin Sellering
- Minister-President of Niedersachsen – David McAllister (until 18 February), Stephan Weil
- Minister-President of North Rhine-Westphalia – Hannelore Kraft
- Minister-President of Rhineland-Palatinate – Kurt Beck (until 16 January), Malu Dreyer
- Minister-President of Saarland – Annegret Kramp-Karrenbauer
- Minister-President of Saxony – Stanislaw Tillich
- Minister-President of Saxony-Anhalt – Reiner Haseloff
- Minister-President of Schleswig-Holstein – Torsten Albig
- Minister-President of Thuringia – Christine Lieberknecht

== Events ==
=== January – June ===
- January – Bavarian Film Awards in Munich
- 16 January – Malu Dreyer becomes Minister-President of Rhineland-Palatinate, succeeding Kurt Beck, who had served in this position since 1994.
- 20 January – Lower Saxony state election, 2013 in Niedersachsen
- 30 January – German Snooker Masters in Berlin
- 7–17 February – 63rd Berlin International Film Festival
- 9 February – Education minister Annette Schavan resigns after having her doctorate removed following a plagiarism scandal.
- 9–19 February – 63rd Berlin International Film Festival in Berlin
- 13 February – The Europe-wide horsemeat scandal spreads to Germany, as some supermarket products sold as beef are found to contain it.
- 14 February – Germany in the Eurovision Song Contest 2013 – Cascada is selected to represent Germany.
- March – CeBIT in Hanover
- March – ITB Berlin in Berlin
- March – Leipzig Book Fair in Leipzig
- 18 March -200 year anniversary of German poet and playwright Christian Friedrich Hebbel
- March – the Merkel government says it would not try to ban the Nationalist National Democratic Party of Germany NPD.
- April – Hannover Messe in Hanover
- April – Deutscher Filmpreis in Berlin
- 1–5 May – German Evangelical Church Day 2013 in Hamburg
- 18 May – Cascada represent Germany at the Eurovision Song Contest in Malmö, Sweden.
- 22 May
  - 150 year birthday of Social Democratic Party of Germany and in Leipzig organisation Progressive Alliance was found.
  - 200 year anniversary of German composer Richard Wagner
- 25 May – The first all-German Champions League final takes place at Wembley Stadium in London, and sees Bayern Munich defeat Borussia Dortmund 2-1.
- June – Kiel Week in Kiel
- June – Heavy floods affect primarily the southern and eastern states of (Bavaria, Saxony and Thuringia).

=== July – December ===
- August – Hanse Sail in Rostock
- August- September – Internationale Funkausstellung Berlin in Berlin
- 10 September Olympic fencing champion German Thomas Bach elected President of the International Olympic Committee to succeed Jacques Rogge.
- 16 September – Bavaria state election, 2013 in Bavaria
- September – ILA Berlin Air Show in Berlin
- September – Gamescom in Cologne
- September – Frankfurt Motor Show in Frankfurt
- September – October – Oktoberfest in Munich
- 22 September
  - German federal election, 2013
  - Hesse state election, 2013 in Hesse
- October – Frankfurt Book Fair
- October/November – In German media and public the 2013 global surveillance disclosures is on media and politic topic and German people got to know, that the mobile phone of chancellor Angela Merkel was hacked by NSA since 2002.
- 3 November – Referendum on the recommunalization of energy supply in Berlin
- 7 December – 26th European Film Awards in Berlin
- 17 December – The Third Merkel cabinet led by Angela Merkel was sworn in.

== Deaths ==
=== January ===
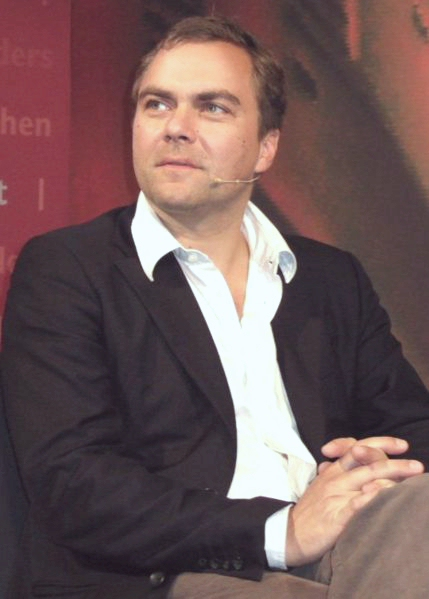
Jakob Arjouni 1964-2013

- 3 January – Thomas Schäuble, 64, German politician (b. 1948)
- 6 January – Gerhard Fieber, 96, animation pioneer, producer and director (b. 1916)
- 9 January – Werner Altegoer, 77, businessman and football administrator (b. 1935)
- 15 January – Princess Margarita of Baden, 80, aristocrat (b. 1932)
- 17 January – Jakob Arjouni, 48, writer (b. 1964)
- 19 January – Hans Massaquoi, 86, German-born American journalist and editor (b. 1926)
- 24 January – Gottfried Landwehr, 83, physicist (b. 1929)

=== February ===
- 3 February – Wolfgang Abraham, 71, footballer (b. 1942)
- 7 February – Jurgen Untermann, 84, linguist (b. 1928)
- 8 February – Dieter Schutte, 89, publisher (b. 1923)
- 9 February – Aki Orr, 81, German-born Israeli politician and writer (b. 1931)
- 13 February – Stefan Wigger, 80, actor (b. 1932)
- 18 February
  - Otfried Preußler, 89, children's book author (b. 1923)
  - Otto Beisheim, 88, manager (b. 1924)
- 19 February – Hubert Schieth, 86, football manager (b. 1927)
- 22 February – Wolfgang Sawallisch, 89, conductor and pianist (b. 1923)

=== March ===
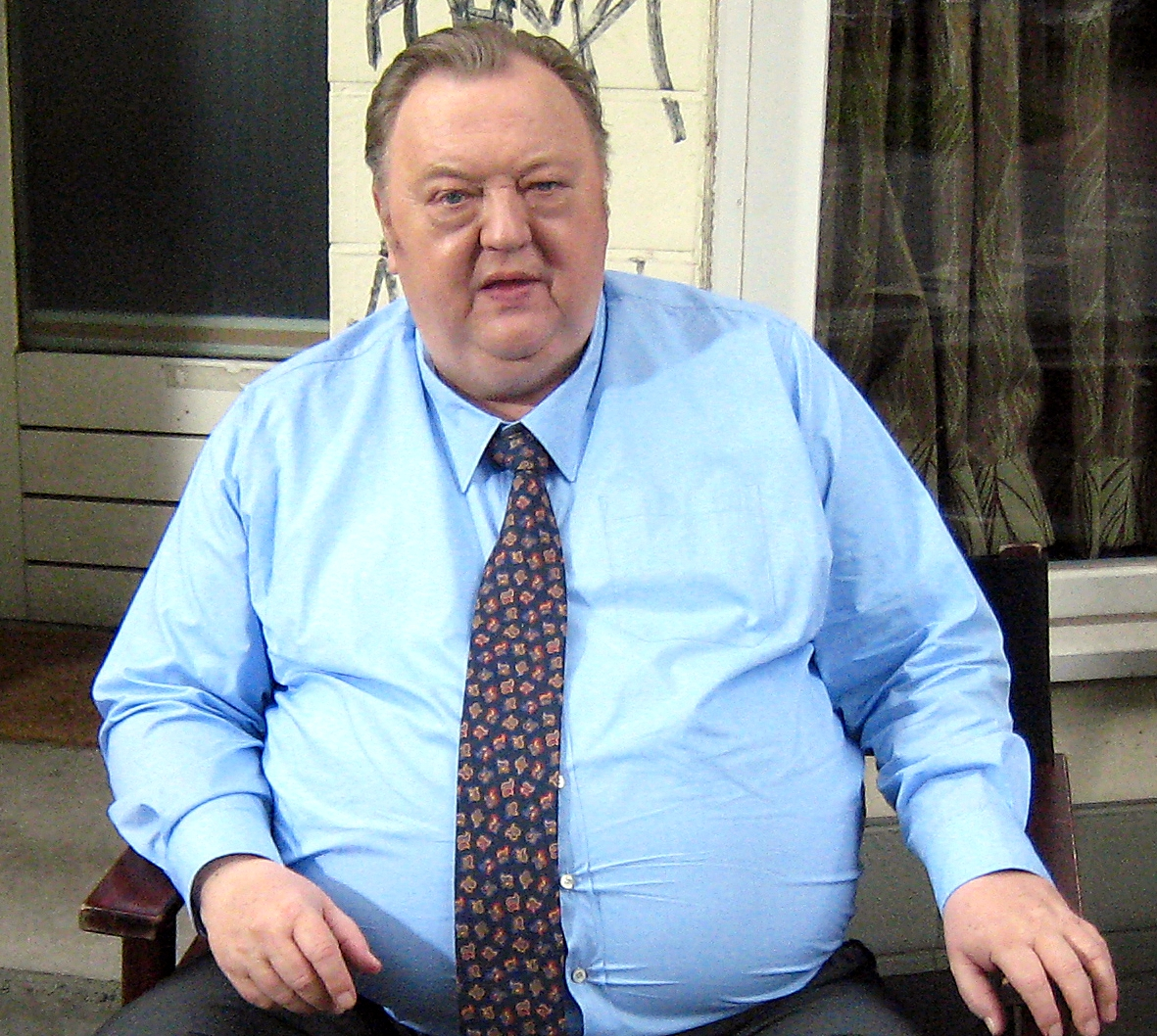
Dieter Pfaff in 2010

- 3 March – Johann Eekhoff, 71, economist (b. 1941)
- 5 March – Dieter Pfaff, 65, actor (b. 1947)
- 6 March – Sabine Bischoff, 54, fencer (b. 1958)
- 8 March – Ewald-Heinrich von Kleist-Schmenzin, 90, officer (b. 1922)
- 11 March – Martin Adolf Bormann, 82, theologian (b. 1930)
- 13 March – Rolf Schult, 85, actor (b. 1927)
- 20 March – Nasser El Sonbaty, 47, bodybuilder (b. 1965)
- 23 March – Reinhard Lakomy, German songwriter, composer (b. 1946)
- 28 March – Heinz Patzig, 83, footballer (b. 1929)

=== April ===
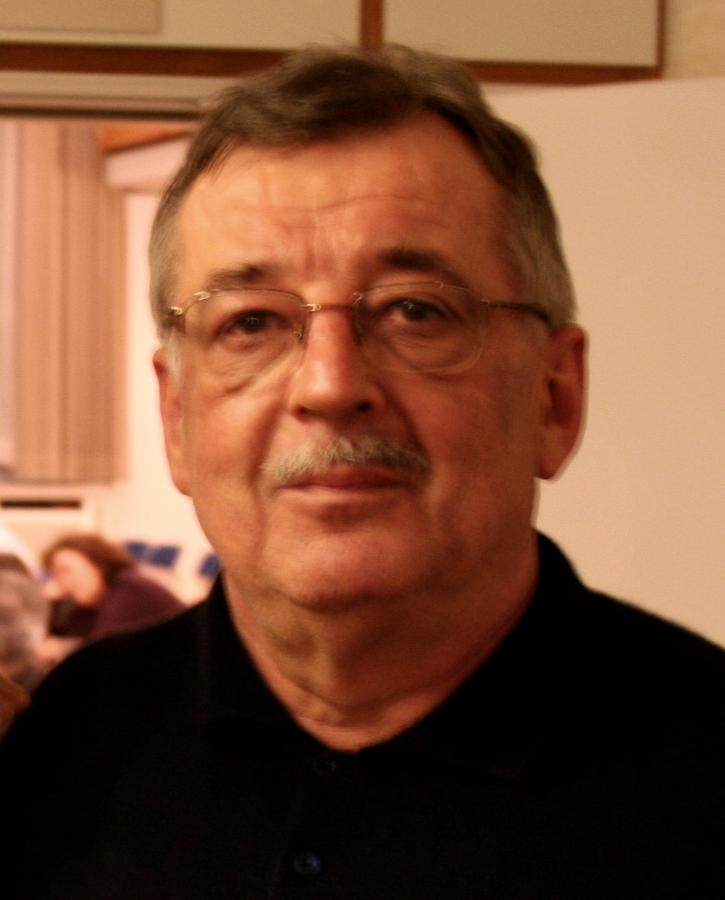
Ottmar Schreiner.

- 6 April – Ottmar Schreiner, 67, politician (b. 1946)
- 10 April – Bernhard Rieger, 90, prelate of the Roman Catholic Church (b. 1922)
- 16 April – Reinhard Lettmann, 80, bishop of the Roman Catholic Church (b. 1933)

=== May ===
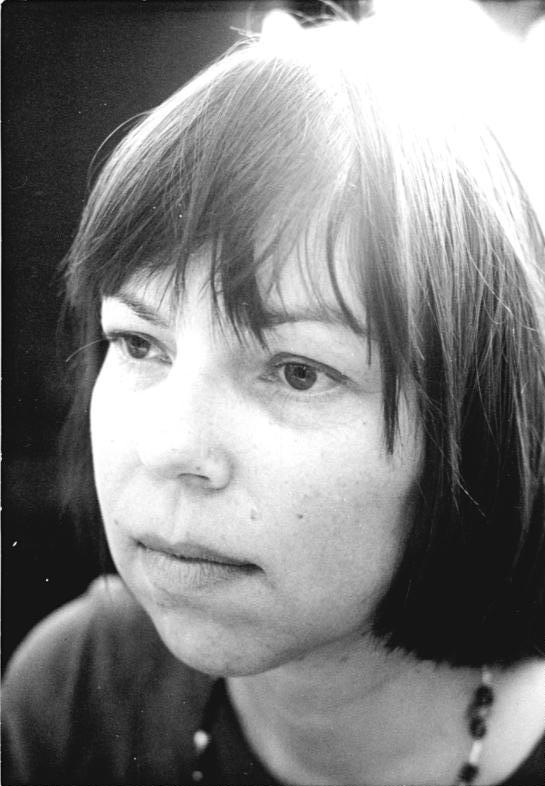
Sarah Kirsch in 1976

- 5 May – Sarah Kirsch – German poet (b. 1935)
- 12 May – Gerd Langguth, 66, German author and professor of policial science (b. 1946)
- 17 May – Peter Schulz, 81, German politician (b. 1930)
- 18 May
  - Ernst Klee, 71, German journalist and author (b. 1942)
  - Lothar Schmid, 85, German chess grandmaster (b. 1928)
- 23 May – Moritz, Landgrave of Hesse, 86, German art collector (b. 1926)
- 24 May – Gotthard Graubner, German painter (b. 1930)
- 26 May – Hildegard Krekel, 60, German actress (b. 1952)
- 28 May – Eddi Arent, 88, German actor (b. 1925)

=== June ===
- 8 June – Willi Sitte, 92, German painter (b. 1921)
- 9 June – Walter Jens, 90, German philosoph (b. 1923)
- 13 June – Gotthard Graubner, 82, German painter (b. 1930)
- 15 June – Heinz Flohe, 65, German footballer (b. 1948)
- 16 June – Ottmar Walter, 89, German footballer (b. 1924)

=== July ===
- 1 July – Ulrich Matschoss, 96, German actor (b. 1917)
- 11 July – Egbert Brieskorn, 77, German mathematician (b. 1936)
- 19 July – Bert Trautmann, 89, German footballer (b. 1923)
- 29 July – Ludwig Averkamp, 86, German prelate of Roman Catholic Church (b. 1927)
- 30 July – Berthold Beitz, 99, German businessman (b. 1913)

=== August ===
- 13 August – Lothar Bisky, 71, German politician (b. 1941)
- 17 August – Claus Jacobi, 86, German journalist (b. 1927)
- 25 August – Karl-Wilhelm Welwei, German historian (b. 1930)

=== September ===
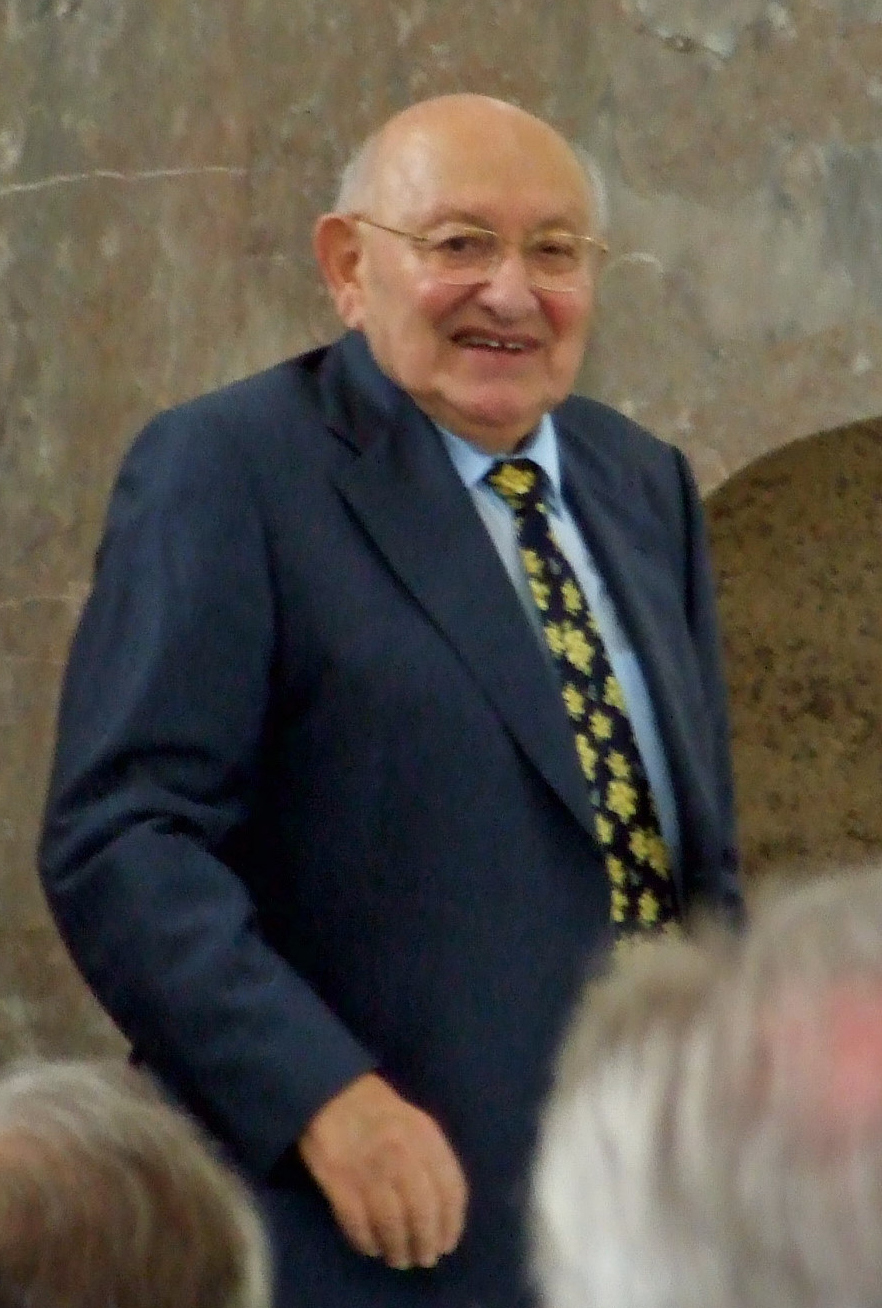
Marcel Reich-Ranicki

- 12 September
  - Erich Loest, 87, German writer (b. 1926)
  - Otto Sander, 72, German actor (b. 1941)
- 18 September – Marcel Reich-Ranicki, 93, German literary critic (b. 1920)
- 21 September – Walter Wallmann, German politician (b. 1932)
- 23 September – Paul Kuhn, 85, German band leader (b. 1928)

=== October ===
- 11 October – Klaus Behrendt, 92, German television actor (b. 1920)
- 15 October – Hans Riegel, 90, German entrepreneur (b. 1923)
- 29 October – Rudolf Kehrer, 90, German classical pianist (b. 1923)

=== November ===
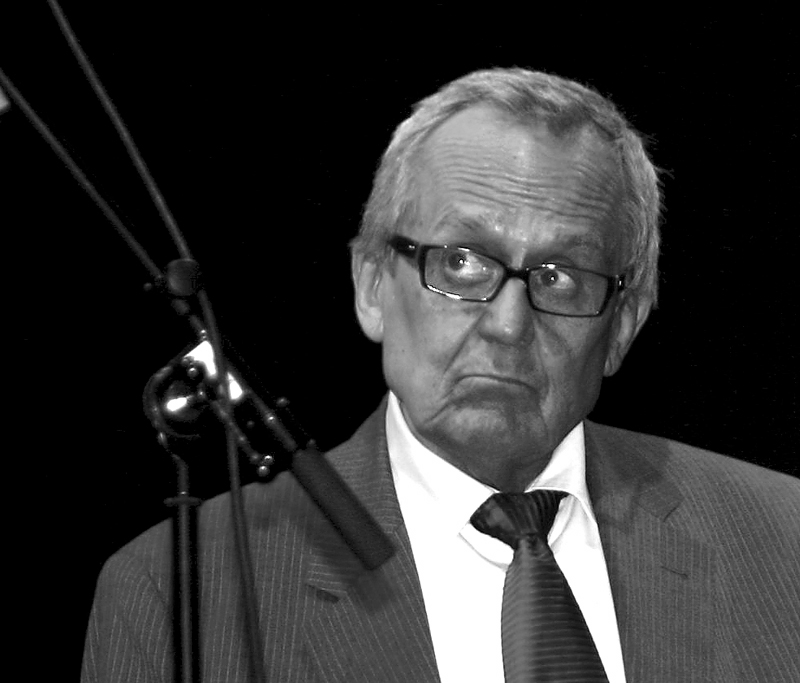
Dieter Hildebrandt

- 4 November – Hans von Borsody, 84, German film actor (b. 1929)
- 7 November
  - Manfred Rommel, 84, German politician (b. 1928)
  - Christian Tasche, 56, German television actor (b. 1957)
- 20 November – Dieter Hildebrandt, 86, German Kabarett artist (b. 1927)

=== December ===
- 5 December – Günther Förg, 61, German painter (b. 1952)
- 9 December – Peter Urban, 72, German translator and writer (b. 1941)
- 15 December – Helmar Frank, 80, German mathematician (b. 1933)
- 24 December – Helga M. Novak, 78, German writer (b. 1935)
- 28 December – Margrit Kennedy, 74, German architect (b. 1939)
- 31 December – Irina Korschunow, 88, German writer (b. 1925)

== See also ==
- 2013 in German television
