= 1924 in Germany =

- Decades: 1900s; 1910s; 1920s; 1930s; 1940s
- See also: Other events of 1924; History of Germany • Timeline • Years

The following lists events that happened during 1924 in the Weimar Republic.

== Incumbents ==
=== National level ===
- President - Friedrich Ebert (Social Democrats)
- Chancellor - Wilhelm Marx (Centre)

== Events ==
- 4 January – The Emminger Reform is enacted that abolished the jury system and replaced it with a mixed system of judges and lay judges.
- 31 January – Leaders of independent republic of the Rhineland Palatinate attempting to formally secede from Germany fails from lack of support.
- 23 February – Great Britain reduces German reparation recovery duties on German goods to 5% due to Germany's economic troubles.
- 26 February – The trial of Adolf Hitler for the Beer Hall Putsch begins and will last until 1 April.
- 3 March – Germany signs a treaty of friendship with Turkey (ruled by Atatürk since October 1923)
- April -- Dawes Plan first proposed
- 4 May – German federal election.
- 26 May – Wilhelm Marx's government resigns after negotiations break down for a coalition.
- 6 June – Germany accepts the Dawes Plan for the reduction of World War I reparations.
- 16 August – Representatives of the French government (Gaston Doumergue was President of France, Édouard Herriot was prime minister) agree to leave the Ruhr in the Occupation of the Ruhr during the London Conference of World War I reparations.
- 29 August – The German Reichstag approves the Dawes Plan.
- 30 August – The German Reichsbank begins operating independently of the German government by issuing a new mark after the hyperinflation completely devaluates the old mark.
- September -- Dawes Plan fully agreed on
- 10 October – An international loan is granted to Germany to help the reconstruction of Germany's economy and industry.
- 18–30 November – France and Belgium return control of the Ruhr to Germany in the Occupation of the Ruhr.
- 7 December – German federal election, December 1924
- German company Hugo Boss was founded.

=== Arts and literature ===
- Thomas Mann's novel Der Zauberberg (The Magic Mountain) is published.
- Kurt Hielscher's photographic album Deutschland: Baukunst und Landschaft (Germany: Architecture and Landscapes) is published.
- Forbidden Paradise, starring Pola Negri, Rod La Rocque, and Adolphe Menjou, is released by director Ernst Lubitsch.
- The Last Laugh, starring Emil Jannings, is released by director F.W. Murnau.
- Waxworks, starring William Dieterle, Emil Jannings, Conrad Veidt, and Werner Krauss, is released by director Paul Leni.
- The opera Intermezzo is first performed by Richard Strauss in Dresden, Germany.
- Artist Kurt Schwitters creates the Merz 32 collage.
- Die Häschenschule a children's book written by Albert Sixtus and illustrated by Fritz Koch-Gotha is published.

== Births ==
- 3 January – Otto Beisheim, German businessman (died 2013)
- 4 January – Marianne Werner, German athlete (died 2023)
- 15 January – Georg Ratzinger, German priest and conductor (died 2020)
- 3 February – Friedrich Wilhelm, Prince of Hohenzollern, German nobleman (died 2010)
- 12 February – Karl-Heinz Kipp, German entrepreneur (died 2017)
- 4 March – Gert Boyle, German-born American businesswoman (died 2019)
- 11 March – Peter Scholl-Latour, German journalist (died 2014)
- 15 March – Walter Gotell, German actor (died 1997)
- 27 March – Herbert Zangs, German artist (died 2003)
- 8 April – Günter Pfitzmann, German actor (died 2003)
- 10 April – Wolfgang Menge, German television director and journalist (died 2012)
- 23 April – Ruth Leuwerik, German film actress (died 2016)
- 3 May – Yehuda Amichai, German-born Israeli poet (died 2000)
- 4 May – Hans-Günther Thalheim, German Germanist and linguist (died 2018)
- 12 May – Jürgen Dethloff, German engineer (died 2002)
- 14 May – Coco Schumann, jazz musician (died 2018)
- 23 May – Karlheinz Deschner, German writer (died 2014)
- 31 May – Gisela May, German actress and singer (died 2016)
- 3 June – Günther Rühle, German theatre critic (died 2021)
- 4 June – Heinz Westphal, German politician (died 1998)
- 10 June – Friedrich L. Bauer, German computer scientist (died 2015)
- 19 June – Anneliese Rothenberger, German operatic soprano (died 2010)
- 20 June
  - Rainer Barzel, German politician (died 2006)
  - Fritz Koenig, German sculptor (died 2017)
- 5 July
  - Niels Jannasch, German-born Canadian historian and museum curator (died 2001)
  - Helga Wex, German politician (died 1986)
- 7 July – Rudolf Pleil, German serial killer (died 1958)
- 8 July – Anton Schwarzkopf, German engineer (died 2001)
- 11 July – Helga Timm, German politician (died 2014)
- 18 July – Wolfram Dorn, German politician (died 2014)
- 24 July – Hans Feldmeier, German pharmacist (died 2025)
- 25 July – Arnold Weiss, German-born American soldier (died 2010)
- 26 July – Ruth Weiss, German-born South African writer and journalist (died 2025)
- 31 July – Ralph Koltai, German-born British stage director (died 2018)
- 15 August – Werner Abrolat, German actor (died 1997)
- 16 August – Ralf Bendix, German Schlager singer, music producer, composer and songwriter (died 2014)
- 2 September – Wolfgang Zeidler, German judge (died 1987)
- 4 September – Helmut Schlesinger, German economist (died 2024)
- 8 September – Franz Josef Müller, German resistance member (died 2015)
- 28 September – Barbara Noack, German writer (died 2022)
- 15 October – Marguerite Andersen, German-Canadian author and educator (died 2022)
- 6 November – Jeanette Schmid, Czech-born entertainer (died 2005)
- 18 November – Elfie Pertramer, German actress (died 2011)
- 30 November – Otto Kaiser, German biblical scholar (died 2017)
- 6 December
  - Harald Heckmann, German musicologist (died 2023)
  - Meinrad Miltenberger, German canoeist (died 1993)
- 11 December – Heinz Schenk, German actor and television presenter (died 2014)
- 15 December – Esther Béjarano, German member of the Women's Orchestra of Auschwitz (died 2021)

== Deaths ==
- 20 January – Franz Dibelius, German Protestant theologian (born 1847)
- 27 February – Hans Georg Friedrich Groß, German balloonist and airship constructor (born 1860)
- 20 March – Adolf von Scholz, German politician (born 1833)
- 10 April – Hugo Stinnes, German industrialist and politician. (born 1870)
- 23 April – Karl Helfferich, German politician (born 1872)
- 25 April – Ernst Büchner, German chemist (born 1850)
- 11 August – Franz Heinrich Schwechten, German architect (born 1841)
- 10 October – Carl von Thieme, German banker (born 1844)
- 2 December – Hugo von Seeliger, German astronomer (born 1849)
