= 1932 in Germany =

- Decades: 1910s; 1920s; 1930s; 1940s; 1950s
- See also: Other events of 1932; History of Germany • Timeline • Years

Events in the year 1932 in Germany.

== Incumbents ==
=== National level ===
President

- Paul von Hindenburg (Non-partisan)

Chancellor

- Heinrich Brüning (Centre) to 30 May, then from 1 June Franz von Papen (Centre to 3 June, then Non-partisan) then 17 November, then from 3 December Kurt von Schleicher (Non-partisan)

== Events ==
- 25 February – Adolf Hitler obtains German citizenship by naturalization, opening the opportunity for him to run in the 1932 election for Reichspräsident.
- 10 April – Paul von Hindenburg is re-elected president of Germany.
- 30 May – Chancellor Heinrich Brüning resigns. President Hindenburg asks Franz von Papen to form a new government.
- 16 June – Bans against the SS and SA are lifted.
- 17 July – Altona Bloody Sunday: In Altona, clashes break out between the police, Nazi SA members and Communist party supporters during a National Socialist demonstration; 18 are killed. Many other political street fights follow.
- 31 July – Federal election: The Nazi Party gains a plurality and the Communists also gain seats. This creates a "negative majority" that prevents any majority coalition that does not include one of the two parties.
- 30 August – Hermann Göring becomes the head of the German Parliament.
- 6 November – Federal election: The Nazis lose many seats, but retain the plurality as the Communists continue to gain. (This is the last free and fair election held throughout East-Germany until 1990.)
- 21 November – President Hindenburg begins negotiations with Adolf Hitler about the formation of a new government.
- 3 December – President Hindenburg names Kurt von Schleicher as German chancellor.
- 25 December – A patent is filed for Prontosil, an antibacterial drug discovered in Wuppertal.

== Births ==
- 6 January - Max Streibl, German politician (died 1998)
- 7 January - Wolfgang Reichmann, German actor (died 1991)
- 18 January - Peter Stuhlmacher, German Protestant theologian (died 2025)
- 2 February - Franz Kamphaus, German bishop of Roman Catholic Church (died 2024)
- 4 February - Gerhard Hund, German mathematician and computer scientist (died 2024)
- 7 February - Anton Schlembach, German bishop of Roman Catholic Church (died 2020)
- 8 February - Horst Eckel, German footballer (died 2021)
- 9 February - Gerhard Richter, German visual artist
- 14 February - Alexander Kluge, German film director (died 2026)
- 18 February - Andreas Meyer-Hanno, German theater and opera director (died 2006)
- 25 February - Hans Apel, German politician (died 2011)
- 26 March - Wolfgang Helfrich, German physicist and inventor (died 2025)
- 2 April - Siegfried Rauch, German actor (died 2018)
- 6 April - Helmut Griem, German actor and director (died 2004)
- 9 April - Hans Dieter Beck, German publisher (died 2025)
- 16 April - Eberhard Panitz, German writer and screenwriter (died 2021)
- 8 May - Arnulf Baring, German author, historian, political scientist and journalist (died 2019)
- 21 May - Gabriele Wohmann, German novelist (died 2015)
- 26 May - Frank Beyer, German film director (died 2006)
- 2 June - Bruno Schleinstein, German actor (died 2010)
- 10 June - Philipp Jenninger, German politician (died 2018)
- 21 June - Friedrich Ostermann, German Roman Catholic auxiliary bishop from Münster (died 2018)
- 25 June - Clark M. Blatteis, German-born American physiologist (died 2021)
- 3 July - Alexander Schalck-Golodkowski, German politician (died 2015)
- 4 July - Marlene Lenz, German politician and translator
- 10 July - Jürgen Becker, German poet (died 2024)
- 14 July - Princess Margarita of Baden, German noblewoman (died 2013)
- 30 July - Michael Bruno, German-born former governor of Israel's central bank and a Chief Economist of the World Bank (died 1996)
- 10 August
  - Alexander Goehr, German-born British composer (died 2024)
  - Jürgen Holtz, German actor (died 2020)
- 4 September - Joe Viera, German jazz saxophonist (died 2024)
- 8 September - Herbert Leuninger, German Roman Catholic priest and refugee rights activist (died 2020)
- 19 September - Stefanie Zweig, German writer (died 2014)
- 24 September - Walter Wallmann, German politician (died 2013)
- 29 September - Rainer Weiss, German-born American physicist (died 2025)
- 30 September - Wilhelm Brückner, German violin maker (died 2025)
- 14 October – Wolf Vostell, German artist (died 1998)
- 16 October - Detlev Karsten Rohwedder, German politician (died 1991)
- 28 October - Gerhart Baum, German lawyer and politician (died 2025)
- 29 October - Charlotte Knobloch, President of Central Council of Jews in Germany
- 1 November - Edgar Reitz, German film director
- 10 November - Roland Bulirsch, German mathematician (died 2022)
- 14 November - Gunter Sachs, German-born Swiss photographer and art collector (died 2011)
- 15 November - Hans Roericht, German designer (died 2025)
- 21 November - Heinrich Lummer, German politician (CDU) (died 2019)
- 22 November - Günter Sawitzki, German international goalkeeper (died 2020)
- 25 November – Franz Grave, German Roman Catholic prelate (died 2022)
- 26 November – Christfried Schmidt, composer (died 2025)
- 28 November – Kurt Horres, German stage director (died 2023)
- 8 December – Claus Luthe, German car designer (died 2008)
- 19 December – Bernhard Vogel, German politician (died 2025)
- 31 December – Felix Rexhausen, German journalist (died 1992)

== Deaths ==
- 13 January – Sophia of Prussia, Prussian princess (born 1870)
- 24 January – Eugen Boermel, German sculptor, writer and inventor (born 1858)
- 25 January – Ernst Friedberger, German immunologist and hygienist (born 1875)
- 6 February – Hermann Ottomar Herzog, German American landscape painter (born 1831)
- 18 February – Frederick Augustus III of Saxony, Germane last King of Saxony (1904–1918) and a member of the House of Wettin (born 1865)
- 15 March – Friedrich Radszuweit, German publisher and author (born 1876)
- 2 April – Hugo von Kathen, German general (born 1855)
- 4 April – Wilhelm Ostwald, German chemist (born 1853)
- 6 April – Max Lenz, German historian (born 1850)
- 26 June – Ernst Scholz, German lawyer and politician (born 1874)
- 2 September – Christian Wilhelm Karl Ewald (born 1852)
- 20 September – Max Slevogt, German painter (born 1868)
- 3 October – Max Wolf, German astronomer (born 1863)
- 23 October – Arthur von Posadowsky-Wehner, German politician (born 1845)
- 11 November – Ludwig Hoffmann, German architect (born 1852)
- 10 December – Eugen Bamberger, German chemist (born 1857)
- 18 December – Eduard Bernstein, German politician (born 1851)
