= 2014 in German television =

This is a list of German television related events from 2014.

== Events ==
- 13 March - Elaiza are selected to represent Germany at the 2014 Eurovision Song Contest with their song "Is It Right". They are selected to be the fifty-ninth German Eurovision entry during Unser Song für Dänemark held at the Lanxess Arena in Cologne.
- 3 May - Aneta Sablik wins the eleventh season of Deutschland sucht den Superstar.
- 9 May - 14-year-old Danyiom Mesmer wins the second season of The Voice Kids.
- 30 May - Singer and winner of the first season of Deutschland sucht den Superstar Alexander Klaws and his partner Isabel Edvardsson win the seventh season of Let's Dance.
- 13 July - Germany beat Argentina 1–0 to win the 2014 World Cup at Rio de Janeiro, Brazil.
- 29 August - Aaron Troschke wins the second season of Promi Big Brother.
- 12 December - Charley Ann Schmutzler wins the fourth season of The Voice of Germany.
- 20 December - 26-year-old pop singer and Travestie artist Marcel Kaupp wins the eighth season of Das Supertalent.

== Debuts ==
- 14 - Diaries of the Great War (29 April 2014 – 13 May 2014)
- Alexander the Great (25 October 2014 – 2 November 2014)

== Television shows ==
=== 1950s ===
- Tagesschau (1952–present)

=== 1960s ===
- heute (1963–present)

=== 1970s ===
- heute-journal (1978–present)
- Tagesthemen (1978–present)

=== 1980s ===
- Wetten, dass..? (1981-2014)
- Lindenstraße (1985–present)

=== 1990s ===
- Gute Zeiten, schlechte Zeiten (1992–present)
- Unter uns (1994–present)
- Verbotene Liebe (1995-2015)
- Schloss Einstein (1998–present)
- In aller Freundschaft (1998–present)
- Wer wird Millionär? (1999–present)

=== 2000s ===
- Deutschland sucht den Superstar (2002–present)
- Let's Dance (2006–present)
- Das Supertalent (2007–present)

=== 2010s ===
- The Voice of Germany (2011–present)
- Promi Big Brother (2013–present)

== Ending this year ==
- Wetten, dass..? (1981-2014)

== Networks and services ==
=== Launches ===
Network	Type	Launch date	Notes	Source
TLC	Cable television	10 April		
Geo Television	Cable television	8 May		
A&E	Cable television	22 September		
Fix & Foxi	Cable television	1 December		

=== Conversions and rebrandings ===
Old network name	New network name	Type	Conversion Date	Notes	Source
glitz*	TNT Glitz	Cable television	8 May		

== Deaths ==
Date	Name	Age	Cinematic Credibility
1 May	Heinz Schenk	89	German TV host & actor

== See also ==
- 2014 in Germany
