= Yvonne-Ruth Killmer =

East German journalist and party official

Yvonne Ruth Killmer
- Born: Yvonne-Ruth Freyer; 12 September 1921; Berlin, Germany
- Died: 27 September 2014 (aged 92); Berlin, Germany
- Education: Karl-Marx Party Academy, Liebenwalde, German Democratic Republic
- Occupations: Journalist; Government press officer Newspaper editor in chief Magazine editor in chief
- Employer(s): "Sächsische Zeitung" "Freie Presse" "Freies Wort* "Für Dich" "Sibylle"
- Political party: KPD; SED
- Spouse: Lothar „Kolja“ Killmer
- Children: y
- Parent: Erich Freyer

Yvonne Ruth Killmer (born Yvonne-Ruth Freyer: 12 September 1921 – 27 September 2014) was an East German journalist and party official. During the 1960s she served as head of the government press office. She later became editor in chief of Freies Wort, a mass circulation party newspaper. Subsequently she became the first editor in chief at the women's magazine, Für Dich. Between 1968 and 1983 she was as editor in chief of the East German bi-monthly fashion magazine, Sibylle.

== Early life and education ==
Yvonne-Ruth Freyer was born in Berlin at the "Urban Krankenhaus" (district hospital). Her mother later recalled that there was a strike running at the time, as a result of which the water and electricity supplies had been cut: Killmer told people she had been born by candle light. Her parents were committed socialists. Erich Freyer, her father was a book dealer who had recently taken on an artisanal publishing business from the socialist activist Adolph Hoffmann. (The printing press had been used in 1891 to produce Hoffmann's at the time still famous / notorious pamphlet "Die zehn Gebote und die besitzende Klasse" - "The ten commandments and the property-owning classes".}

In January 1933 the National Socialist Party took power and rapidly transformed Germany into a one-party dictatorship. As well networked Berlin socialists with their own printing press, it was clear that the Freyers would find themselves attracting the interest of the security services. Later in 1933, the family emigrated to Amsterdam, where between 1933 and 1935 Killmer attended upper school. Her parents subsequently moved again, this time to France, while Killmer returned to Germany. Between 1935 and 1938, Killmer lived with her grandmother in Glauchau, a small town near Leipzig. Until 1938 she attended the "Handelsschule" in Glauchau, where the curriculum would have been designed to prepare her for work in the world of business and commerce. Between 1937 and 1940, Killmer undertook and completed an apprenticeship in office work.

== Career ==
=== World War II: 1939-1945 ===
World War II began in 1939, and from 1941 till 1943 Freyer worked as a typist at the Senior Aviation Engineering Academy ("Höheren Fliegertechnischen Schule") in Jüterbog. She was then employed as a typist, between 1943 and 1945, by Märkle & Kniesche, a tobacco products wholesaler in Leipzig. During the war she had an illegitimate child of whom little is known.

Leipzig and the surrounding region were liberated from the National Socialist government by US forces on 18 April 1945, but by this time it had already been agreed the previous September between President Roosevelt (who died on 12 April, the week before the capture of the city), Marshal Stalin and (with varying levels of enthusiasm) other "allied leaders", that after the war Leipzig would be part of a large region in central Germany to be administered as the Soviet occupation zone. Early in July 1945, the United States withdrew and the Red Army moved in. Membership of political parties - other than of the National Socialist party - had been illegal since 1933, but under allied occupation this was no longer the case.

=== Political involvement and early journalism: 1945-1950 ===
During 1945 Yvonne-Ruth Freyer joined the Communist Party. Reflecting a widespread determination that, at least in Germany, populist street politicians should never again be able to exploit divisions on the political left in order to take power, in April 1946 a contentious merger was implemented - in reality effective only in the Soviet zone - between the Communist Party and the Social Democratic Party. Freyer was one of hundreds of thousands of Communist Party members who lost no time in using the pre-printed form, which the party authorities had helpfully prepared, to sign their party membership over to the new Socialist Unity Party ("Sozialistische Einheitspartei Deutschlands" / SED). Meanwhile she made her way back to Glauchau where, between 1945 and 1947, she worked as a member of the office support staff at the local police station.

During 1945 and 1946, Killmer also volunteered with the Dresden-based newspaper Sächsische Zeitung. Responsibility for each day's edition seems to have been rotated on a daily basis between those whose political backgrounds favoured the Social Democratic version of socialism and those, such as Freyer, who had come from the Communist Party. Tasks were allocated among the staff on a correspondingly variable basis. Freyer's own baptism of fire came when she was sent to report on a party meeting addressed by Walter Ulbricht, a local man who had spent the war years in Moscow. Ulbricht was already emerging, within the Soviet zone, as an important orthodox Stalinist member of the party leadership. By the time the zone was relaunched, in October 1949, as the Soviet sponsored German Democratic Republic (East Germany), Walter Ulbricht would be uneasily ensconced not as one among several, but as the de facto leader of the party, and thereby also of the state and of the government. As she much later recalled, back in 1946 Freyer felt more than a little overwhelmed by her mission: "He might have been speaking in Chinese.I didn't understand a word". (Note: "Der hätte auch Chinesisch sprechen können – ich verstand kein Wort.")

Most of her more politically enthused contemporaries were at this point still working as youth leaders with the party's recently inaugurated Free German Youth organisation, but the newspaper internship, though challenging, evidently suited Freyer well. It provided the opportunity to learn from more experienced colleagues such as the Spanish Civil War veteran,Georg Stibi, who later became a deputy foreign minister of the German Democratic Republic. In 1947-48 she undertook a six month course in journalism at the Karl-Marx Party Academy at Liebenwalde, just outside Berlin. During 1948 and 1949 she then worked as a regional press officer in Saxony for the Democratic Women's League ("Demokratischer Frauenbund Deutschlands" / DFD), which was one of five important quasi-party mass organisations which under the Leninist constitutional structure adopted from the Soviet Union had a fixed quota of seats in the East German parliament ("Volkskammer") in what by this time was becoming a new kind of German one-party dictatorship. During 1949–50 she worked for the ruling party's regional leadership team ("... SED-Landesleitung Sachsen").

=== Established journalist: 1951–1981 ===
In 1951 Yvonne-Ruth Freyer was appointed editor in chief of the regional Zwickau-based party regional newspaper "Freie Presse". This made her the first female editor in chief of a mass-circulation newspaper anywhere in East Germany. Her incumbency was brief, however, since in 1952 she was transferred to the newly launched party newspaper "Freies Wort", published in Suhl. She was the paper's founding editor, and remained in editorial control of it till 1959. Between 1956 and 1960 she combined this with membership of the party regional leadership team ("SED-Bezirksleitung") for Suhl, also - for some of the time - chairing the local branch of the national Union of Journalists. After this, having been awarded a "service medal", during 1959/60 she underwent a further training course at the Karl-Marx Party Academy (which by this time was accommodated in central Berlin).

In 1960 she accepted a post as press officer for the chairman of the East German Council of Ministers. In reality her duties involved acting as an additional "control authority", monitoring the media on behalf of ministers. The job came with high status and a large office in Berlin: she also found the posting highly educative. She moved back to Saxony in 1962 and took over at "Für Dich", an illustrated newspaper targeting women. A "test edition" was produced in December 1962: starting in 1963, "Für Dich" then appeared as a weekly publication for nearly three decades. "Für Dich" had few obvious rivals and, at its peak, achieved a circulation in East Germany of almost a million copies. Freyer served as its editor in chief between 1962 and 1968. The job involved frequent interaction with Lotte Ulbricht, the leader's wife, who took a close interest in the magazine. Recalling the situation many years later Yvonne-Ruth would insist that she had enough backbone, relevant experience and political dexterity to handle it. As before, Freyer's editorial duties were combined with other political responsibilities. Between 1964 and 1969 Freyer served as a national presidium member with the DFD. For some of this time she also served as a member of the so-called "Women Commission" set up by and reporting to the Politburo, which was the inner caucus of the powerful Party Central Committee. Between 1968 and 1981 Yvonne-Ruth Freyer was editor in chief of the high-profile women's magazine "Sibylle".

== Personal life ==
In October 1981 Yvonne-Ruth Freyer married the journalist Lothar „Kolja“ Killmer (1919–2000). It was her first marriage and his second. Her husband's first wife, Anja Killmer-Korn, had died five months earlier. Anja, who came originally from Vienna, had been a resistance activist during the Hitler years and was twenty-three years older than her husband. Yvonne-Ruth had known both of them since 1946, having met "Kolja" Killmer on a course back then. There are suggestions that she had come close to becoming his first wife, before having to relocate from Saxony in order to spend a term at the Karl-Marx Party Academy near Berlin. Although she was already 60, and her husband 62, when they married, the two of them went on to enjoy 18 years of marriage together.
