= Friedenshaus Ludwigshafen =

- Friedenshaus Ludwigshafen
- Formation: January 2016
- Type: Non-profit community project
- Headquarters: Berliner Straße 43, 67059 Ludwigshafen am Rhein, Germany
- Parent organization: Arbeitsgemeinschaft Südwestdeutscher Mennonitengemeinden (ASM)
- Website: friedenshaus.net

Friedenshaus Ludwigshafen (German: House of Peace) is a community integration centre in Ludwigshafen am Rhein, Rhineland-Palatinate, Germany. Founded in January 2016 by Gregory Rabus and Jennifer Otto, two Mennonite volunteers from North America, it operates within the premises of the local Mennonite congregation under the Mennonite Regional Conference of the Palatinate (Arbeitsgemeinschaft Südwestdeutscher Mennonitengemeinden (ASM)). By 2026 the centre had served an estimated 4,000 people, offering free German language courses, administrative assistance, and intercultural activities to refugees, migrants, and local residents.

== Background and founding ==
Preparations began in 2015 when Gregory Rabus — an American-born Mennonite who had been living in Germany since 2010 — visited asylum cafés in Ludwigshafen, consulted the local Volkshochschule, and mapped unmet needs in the city.

The model was inspired in part by a Mennonite community centre (Maison de l'amitié – House of Friendship) that had operated in Montreal, Canada, since the 1970s. The goal was a space that would bring together congregation members, long-term Ludwigshafen residents, and newcomers.

The centre opened in January 2016 with an English-language conversation group that attracted limited interest. The German courses introduced shortly afterwards quickly reached capacity, and the organisation stopped advertising within months. On 9 May 2026, Friedenshaus held its tenth-anniversary celebration at its permanent address on the Berliner Straße.

== Mission and philosophy ==
Friedenshaus holds that barriers between people are broken down through personal acquaintance and shared activity. It does not position itself as a language institute: it issues no certificates and runs no formal examinations. Its German courses are conceived as a complementary conversational space for learners whose formal instruction takes place elsewhere.

The name Friedenshaus reflects the historic peace-church tradition of the Mennonites, who understand themselves as called toward non-violent conflict resolution and hospitality toward strangers. All programmes are open to participants regardless of religious affiliation, cultural background, or sexual orientation.

== Organisational structure ==
Friedenshaus operates as a project of the Mennonitische Regionalkonferenz der Pfalz and maintains formal ties with several Mennonite bodies:

- Arbeitsgemeinschaft Südwestdeutscher Mennonitengemeinden (ASM)
- Deutsches Mennonitisches Friedenskomitee (DMFK)
- Deutsches Mennonitisches Missionskomitee (DMMK)
- Mennonite Central Committee (MCC)
- Mennonitisches Hilfswerk (MH)

The Advisory Board (Beirat) comprises five members (as of 2026): Birgit Foth, Brigitta Albrecht, Miriam Kohrn, Patrick Schmidt, and Wolfgang Seibel. Day-to-day coordination is carried out by Oscar Cardozo and his wife Eva Froese, who came from Montréal, Canada.

== Programmes ==
=== German conversation courses ===
Conversation-based German courses (Deutsch-Konversationskurse) run five times a week at multiple proficiency levels from complete beginners through CEFR B1. A dedicated stream prepares participants for the B1 Deutschtest für Zuwanderer (DTZ), the examination required for permanent residence in Germany. All courses are free of charge.

=== Administrative assistance ===
The Hilfe bei Formularen (forms assistance) service helps residents complete official documents and respond to public authorities, including pension applications, employer correspondence, and communications with the immigration authority (Ausländerbehörde). Shabir Ahmad Aimaq, an Afghan teacher who was himself a language course participant, now assists weekly with forms and interpreting.

=== Sewing project ===
The Nähprojekt brings together volunteers and participants to sew patchwork quilts from donated fabrics, which are donated as relief goods to organisations supplying conflict-affected areas. In 2026 the project was producing blankets for displaced persons in Ukraine.

=== Social and cultural events ===
Communal potluck meals, grilling events, children's outings, and celebrations of diverse cultural traditions complement the structured programmes. Early communal meals drew up to 80 participants. Sawatzki describes the principle as: "Everyone brings something from their homeland so that everyone can learn from each other."

=== Micro-courses ===
Friedenshaus also offers Mikro-Kurse (micro-courses): short, focused units targeting specific language or integration needs not covered by the regular conversation courses.

== Funding ==
All services are provided free to participants.

== Impact and reach ==
By 2026 Heidelinde Sawatzki estimated that approximately 4,000 people had passed through the centre since its founding. A recurring pattern is former beneficiaries returning as volunteers. Shabir Ahmad Aimaq, who required language support and administrative help on arrival from Afghanistan, became a regular weekly volunteer. Ahmed Mohamed, who arrived from Egypt in September 2022, volunteers at several Ludwigshafen refugee cafés and worked as a youth supervisor in cooperation with the city's youth welfare office.

The centre's model was presented as a workshop at the Mennonite World Conference in Indonesia in 2022 under the title The Peace House: encountering the stranger.

== Media coverage ==
- Die Rheinpfalz, 22 February 2016: first press notice announcing the opening of a conversation circle.
- Die Rheinpfalz, 8 April 2017: full feature profile of the centre's first year of operation.
- Canadian Mennonite, 19 April 2017: An Idea Worth Sharing.
- Canadian Mennonite, 26 May 2017: Prosthetic limb leads to new hope for Syrian refugee.
- Canadian Mennonite, 11 March 2020: Where are they now?
- SWR Aktuell, 2 November 2023: two reports on the centre's integration work and volunteers.
- Die Rheinpfalz, 7 May 2026: tenth-anniversary feature Vom Traum zur Anlaufstelle: Friedenshaus in Ludwigshafen wird 10 und hilft weiter by Claudia Matheis.
