= Die Rheinpfalz =

Daily newspaper in Germany

- Type: Daily newspaper
- Owner: Stuttgarter Zeitung Verlagsgesellschaft GmbH
- Founders: Arthur Lenk; Hans Wipprecht; Xaver Resch
- Publisher: Die Rheinpfalz Verlag und Druckerei GmbH
- Founded: 1945; 80 years ago
- Language: German
- Headquarters: Ludwigshafen
- Country: Germany
- Website: Die Rheinpfalz

Die Rheinpfalz (German: [diː ˈʁaɪnˌpfalts]) is a German–language regional newspaper based in Ludwigshafen, Germany. The paper is one of the leading newspapers which serve the state of Rhineland-Palatinate.

== History and profile ==
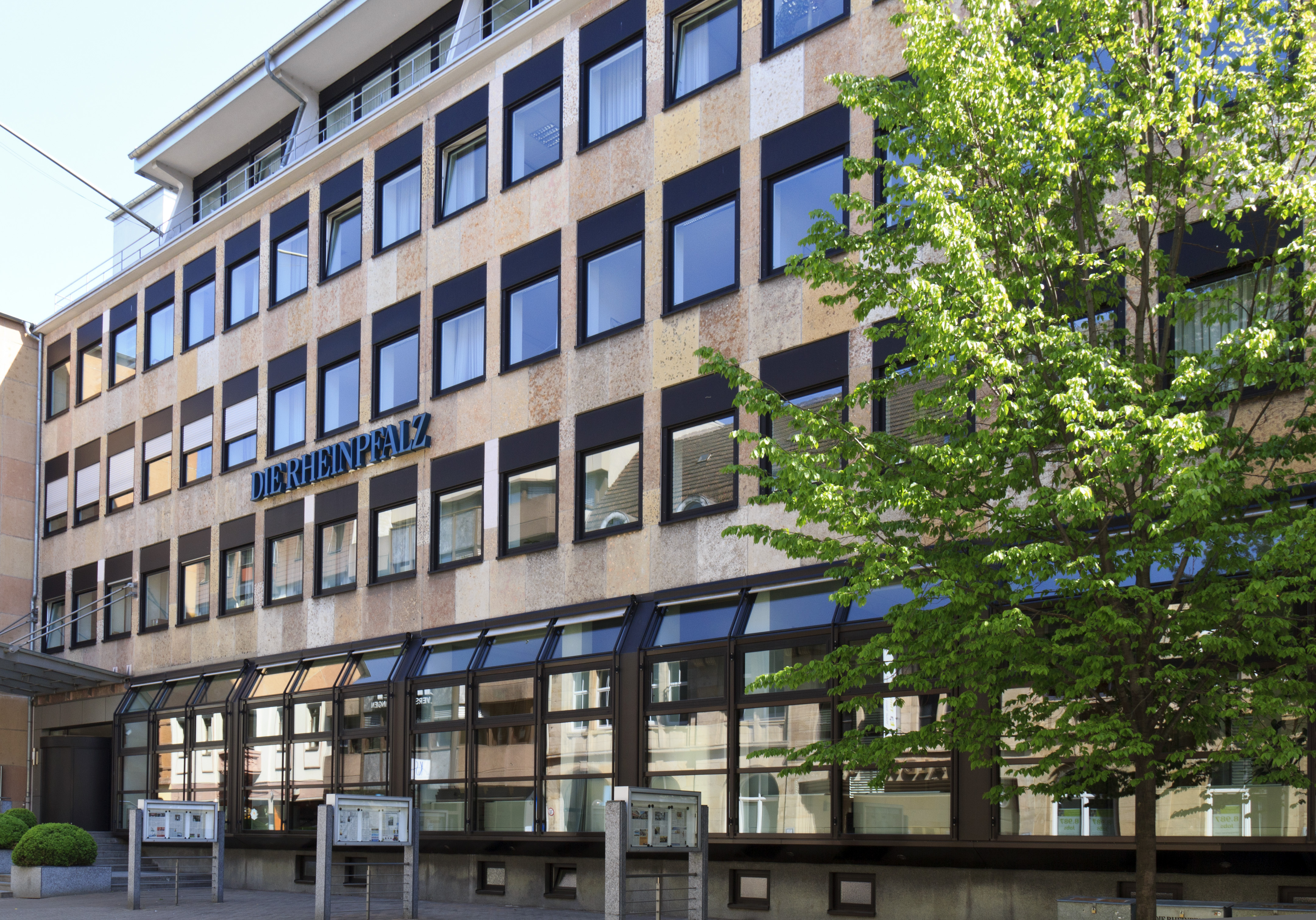
Headquarters of Rheinpfalz in Ludwigshafen

Die Rheinpfalz was first published in September 1945. The co-founders of the paper were Arthur Lenk, Hans Wipprecht and Xaver Resch. The Allied Forces that occupied Germany following World War II supported the establishment of the paper of which the parent company is the Medien Union GmbH. The paper is owned by Stuttgarter Zeitung Verlagsgesellschaft GmbH which also owns Freie Presse, Südwestpresse and Stuttgarter Zeitung, among others.

Die Rheinpfalz is published by a company with the same name, Die Rheinpfalz Verlag und Druckerei GmbH. The company is a subsidiary of Medien Union GmbH and also, operates the website of the paper. The headquarters of the paper is in Ludwigshafen.

== Circulation ==
The circulation of Die Rheinpfalz was 346,800 copies in the mid-1990s. In 2001 the paper had a circulation of 247,000 copies. It rose to 249,980 copies in the second quarter of 2003. The paper sold 242,560 copies in the first quarter of 2006. Its circulation was 235,542 copies in the first quarter of 2012.
