= 2013 in German television =

This is a list of German television related events from 2013.

== Events ==
- 14 February - Cascada are selected to represent Germany at the 2013 Eurovision Song Contest with their song "Glorious". They are selected to be the fifty-eighth German Eurovision entry during Unser Song für Malmö held at the TUI Arena in Hanover.
- 10 May - 12-year-old Michèle Bircher wins the first season of The Voice Kids.
- 11 May - Beatrice Egli wins the tenth season of Deutschland sucht den Superstar.
- 31 May - Verliebt in Berlin actor Manuel Cortez and his partner Melissa Ortiz-Gomez win the sixth season of Let's Dance.
- 27 September - Actress Jenny Elvers wins the first season of Promi Big Brother.
- 14 December - 17-year-old animal trainer Lukas Pratschker and his dog Falco win the seventh season of Das Supertalent.
- 20 December - Andreas Kümmert wins the third season of The Voice of Germany.

== Debuts ==
=== Domestic ===
- 6 January - Hotel Adlon: A Family Saga (2013) (ZDF)
- 13 September - Promi Big Brother (2013–present)

=== International ===
- 8 April - (United States) / (Canada) / (United Kingdom) Martha Speaks (2008–2014) (Super RTL)

== Television shows ==
=== 1950s ===
- Tagesschau (1952–present)

=== 1960s ===
- heute (1963-present)

=== 1970s ===
- heute-journal (1978-present)
- Tagesthemen (1978-present)

=== 1980s ===
- Wetten, dass..? (1981-2014)
- Lindenstraße (1985–present)

=== 1990s ===
- Gute Zeiten, schlechte Zeiten (1992–present)
- Unter uns (1994-present)
- Verbotene Liebe (1995-2015)
- Schloss Einstein (1998–present)
- In aller Freundschaft (1998–present)
- Wer wird Millionär? (1999-present)

=== 2000s ===
- Deutschland sucht den Superstar (2002–present)
- Let's Dance (2006–present)
- Das Supertalent (2007–present)

=== 2010s ===
- The Voice of Germany (2011–present)

== Networks and services ==
=== Launches ===
Network	Type	Launch date	Notes	Source
Sat.1 Gold	Cable television	17 January		
Sony Entertainment Television	Cable television	22 April		
ProSieben Maxx	Cable television	3 September		
Universal Channel	Cable television	5 September		

=== Closures ===
Network	Type	End date	Notes	Sources
Disney Channel	Cable television	30 November		
Das Vierte	Cable television	31 December		

== See also ==
- 2013 in Germany
