= Christian Wilhelm Karl Ewald =

German politician (1852–1932)

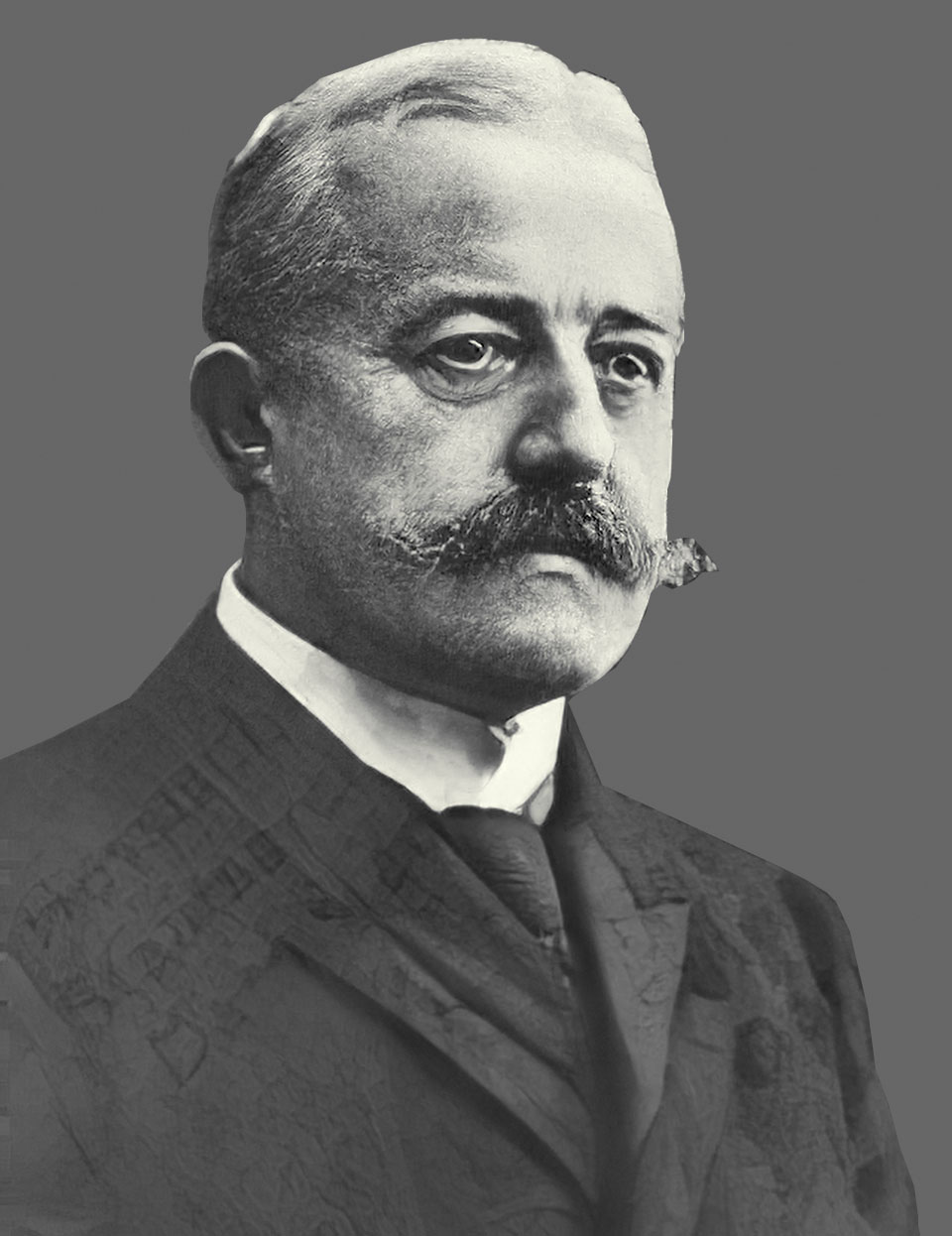
Christian Wilhelm Karl Ewald

Christian Wilhelm Karl Ewald, beginning 1912 von Ewald, (18 June 1852 in Rehbach – 2 September 1932 in Darmstadt) was a Grand Duchy of Hesse Minister of State and a Reichsgericht member.
