= Richard Kolitsch =

German footballer

Personal information
- Full name: Richard Kolitsch
- Date of birth: 24 October 1989
- Place of birth: Dresden, East Germany
- Date of death: 23 May 2014 (aged 24)
- Height: 1.83 m (6 ft 0 in)
- Position: Midfielder

Team information
- Current team: FC Carl Zeiss Jena II
- Number: 21

Youth career
- 1999–2003: VfL Pirna-Copitz 07
- 2003–2006: FV Dresden-Nord
- 2007–2008: FC Carl Zeiss Jena

Senior career*
Years	Team	Apps	(Gls)
2007–2013	FC Carl Zeiss Jena II	57	(2)
2008–2009	FC Carl Zeiss Jena	9	(0)
- * Club domestic league appearances and goals as of 10 November 2012

Richard Kolitsch (24 October 1989 – 23 May 2014) was a German football midfielder who played for FC Carl Zeiss Jena II.

== Career ==
He began his career in the youth team of FV Dresden-Nord, before he moved to FC Carl Zeiss Jena in January 2007.

Kolitsch was under manager Henning Bürger promoted to first team on the last but one matchday in the 2007–08 season. He made his debut on matchday 33 against 1. FC Kaiserslautern after substitution in the halftime.

== Personal life ==
His father Uwe Kolitsch is former professional player of SpVgg Erkenschwick. Richard Kolitsch died in a traffic accident.
