= Bernhard Rieger =

- Titular bishop of Tigava
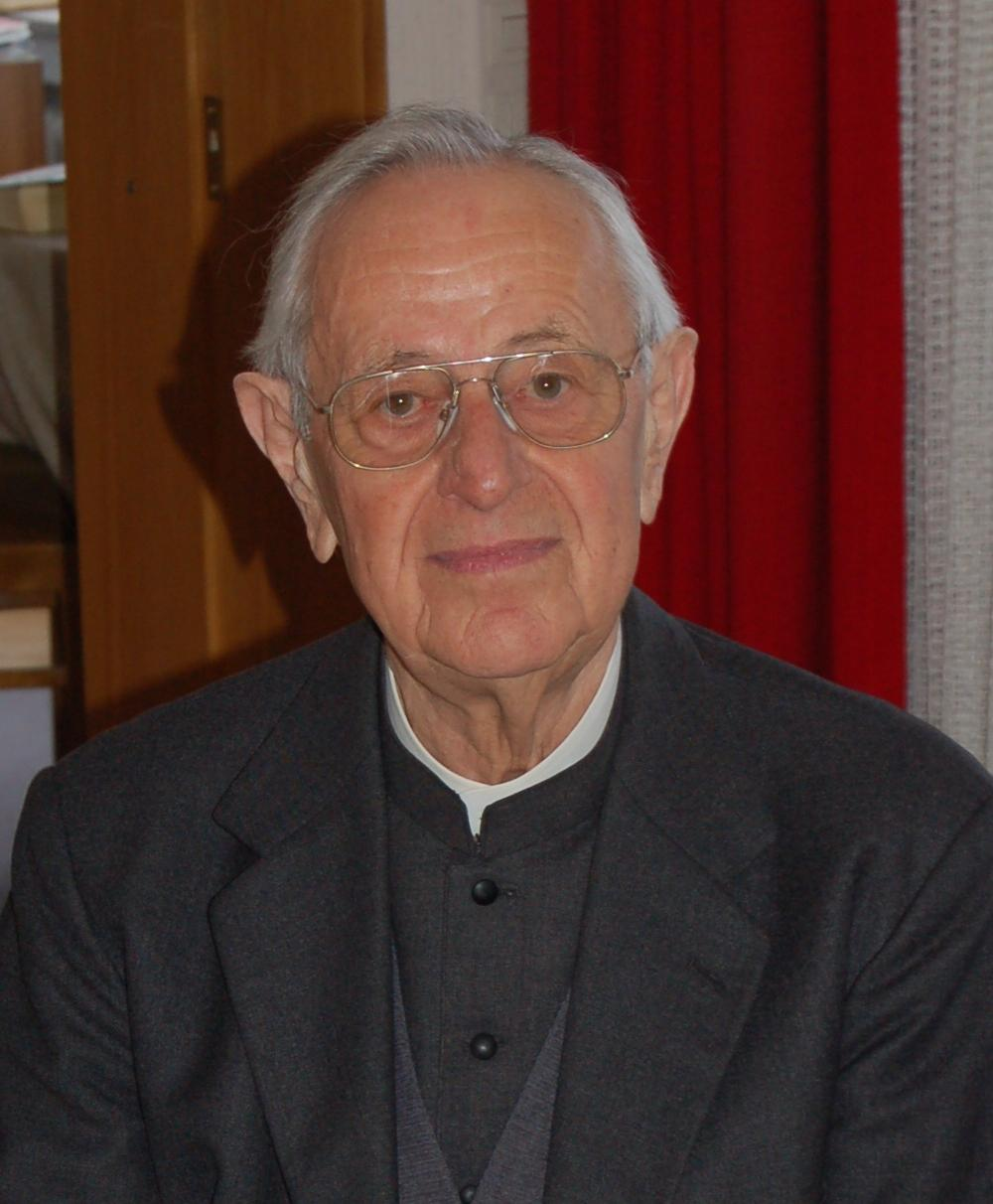
- Bernhard Rieger in Kressbronn 2007
- Church: Roman Catholic Church
- See: Titular See of Tigava
- In office: 1984 - 2013
- Predecessor: John Louis Morkovsky
- Successor: Incumbent
- Previous post(s): Prelate

Orders
- Ordination: 29 July 1951

Personal details
- Born: 17 December 1922; Wißgoldingen, Germany
- Died: 10 April 2013 (aged 90); Kressbronn, Germany

Bernhard Rieger (born 17 December 1922; died 10 April 2013 in Kressbronn) was a German Prelate of the Roman Catholic Church.

Rieger was born in Wißgoldingen, Germany and was ordained a priest on 29 July 1951. Rieger was appointed bishop to the Diocese of Rottenburg-Stuttgart on 20 December 1984 as well as titular bishop of Tigava and ordained bishop on 2 February 1985. Reiger retired from Rottenburg-Stuttgart Diocese on 31 July 1996.

== See also ==
- Diocese of Rottenburg-Stuttgart
