= Dirk Sager =

German journalist

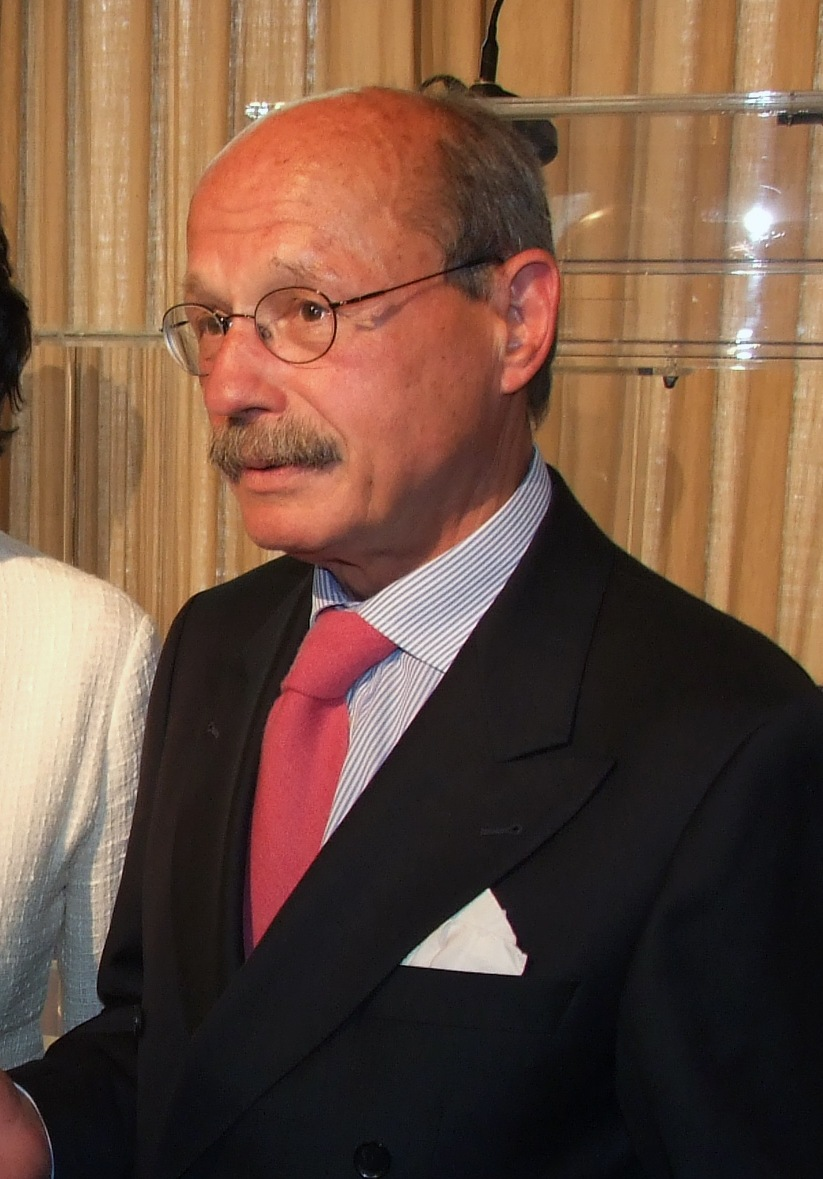
- Sager in 2009
- Born: 13 August 1940; Hamburg, Germany
- Died: 2 January 2014 (aged 73); Potsdam, Germany
- Occupation: Journalist
- Years active: 1966–2013

Dirk Sager (13 August 1940 – 2 January 2014) was a German journalist.

== Life ==
Sager studied American studies, politics and journalism at the Free University of Berlin. He worked as journalist in German television. Since 1968 he worked for German broadcaster ZDF. He was member of P.E.N.

== Awards ==
- 1997: Deutscher Kritikerpreis (together with Friedhelm Brebeck and Friedrich Schreiber)
- 2002: Hanns Joachim Friedrichs Award
