= Freies Wort =

German newspaper in Thuringia

- Type: Daily newspaper
- Format: Berliner
- Owner(s): Süddeutscher Verlag (70%), dd vg (30%)
- Editor: Herbert Wessels
- Founded: 15 August 1952
- Political alignment: Left Wing; Liberal
- Headquarters: Suhl

Freies Wort is the largest regional newspaper in southern Thuringia. Including Meininger Tageblatt, Freies Wort has a circulation of 80,000.

== History and profile ==
The newspaper was founded as an organ of the Suhl sector of the SED. It was first published as Das Freie Wort on 15 August 1952 with a circulation of 157,400 and was the smallest SED-controlled newspaper at the time and eight city desks. The newspaper was renamed to Freies Wort on 9 March 1956.

After German reunification, the newspaper was privatised in 1991 and sold to Süddeutscher Verlag, Munich (which now holds 70%) and Deutsche Druck- und Verlagsgesellschaft (owned by the SPD political party, holding 30%).

The chief editor is Herbert Wessels (since 2009), second editor is Markus Ermert (since 2002).

== Local news desks ==
Freies Wort has seven local news desks:

1. Suhl
2. Zella-Mehlis
3. Ilmenau
4. Sonneberg
5. Hildburghausen
6. Schmalkalden
7. Bad Salzungen

== Shared content ==
Freies Wort cooperates with the Meininger Mediengesellschaft mbH which issues the FW Meininger Tageblatt, the two newspapers share articles and sometimes whole pages.

Together with the newspapers Neue Presse (Coburg), Südthüringer Zeitung (Bad Salzungen) and Frankenpost (Hof) Freies Wort forms the "Regionalzeitungsgruppe Hof/Coburg/Suhl" operated by Süddeutscher Verlag. The four newspapers share a common national and international section.
