= Clark M. Blatteis =

German-American professor (1932–2021)

- Born: June 25, 1932; Berlin, Weimar Republic (present-day Germany)
- Died: March 14, 2021 (aged 88); Memphis, Tennessee, U.S.
- Education: Rutgers University (BA, 1954); University of Iowa (MS, 1955; PhD, 1957)
- Spouse: Yolanda Fuentes Barriga (m. 1958; died 2018)
- Children: 3
- Scientific career
- Fields: Physiology
- Workplaces: University of Tennessee College of Medicine; United States Army Research Institute of Environmental Medicine
- Doctoral advisor: Steven M. Horvath
- Other academic advisors: Alberto Hurtado; Geoffrey S. Dawes

Clark Martin Blatteis (June 25, 1932 – March 14, 2021), was a German-American biomedical researcher. After escaping Nazi Germany as a child, he became a distinguished professor in the field of physiology at the University of Tennessee College of Medicine in Memphis, Tennessee, where much of his work focused on discovering details of the mechanisms by which fevers develop.

== Early life, education, and career ==
Born in Berlin, Germany, Blatteis and his Jewish family were forced to flee their home to escape further Nazi persecution after his father's arrest in the aftermath of the Kristallnacht and as a condition for his release from Buchenwald concentration camp where he was a prisoner. They were among the 937 Jewish German refugees aboard the MS St. Louis who were denied entry into Cuba, the United States, Canada, and all the other Western Hemisphere countries, and consequently obliged to return to Europe. There, the family was granted refuge in Belgium, but had to flee again when that country was invaded by the Nazis in 1940. They made their way ultimately to Casablanca, French Morocco, where Blatteis attended school from elementary through high school, partly (1940–1942) under Nazi (Vichy-France) occupation.

The family was finally able to immigrate to the United States in 1948, where Blatteis continued his education, earning a BA from Rutgers University in 1954, and an MS and a PhD in physiology under the mentorship of Dr. Steven M. Horvath in 1955 and 1957, respectively, from the University of Iowa. Blatteis later recalled that his introduction by Horvath to his later field of research was "trying to maintain my own body temperature as a test subject in the cold room". Immediately following his graduation, he was drafted into the U.S. Army and assigned as a first lieutenant, Medical Service Corps, to the United States Army Medical Research Institute of Infectious Diseases at Fort Knox, Kentucky, where he served until 1961. While there, he conducted experiments on dogs to determine the cause of shivering, reporting that it related to circulation of cooled blood rather than a nervous response. From 1961 to 1962 he was a National Institutes of Health postdoctoral fellow under Dr. Alberto Hurtado at the Institute of Andean Biology, San Marcos University in Lima, Peru, where he studied fetuses to determine whether acclimation to high altitudes began before birth, and concluding that it did. From 1962 to 1963, he studied under Dr. Geoffrey S. Dawes at Nuffield College, Oxford.

Upon his return to the U.S. in 1963, Blatteis joined the United States Army Research Institute of Environmental Medicine in Natick, Massachusetts, as a civilian researcher and branch chief. In 1966, Blatteis was appointed to the faculty of the Department of Physiology, University of Tennessee College of Medicine, as an associate professor, becoming a full professor in 1974. The following year he was named a Fulbright scholar for a program at the Cayetano Heredia University of Peru from June to September 1975.

== Professorial career ==
The bulk of his research over his years at the University of Tennessee concerned the elucidation of the physiologic mechanism that initiates fever and its associated reactions to infectious pathogens. He published a study on fever induction mechanisms in 1983 which outlined mechanisms by which cytokines produced following infection could cross the blood–brain barrier, and which "launched a new concept of immune to brain signaling". In a 1996 paper, he proposed a role for the vagus nerve in fever induction. Also in 1996, he co-edited with M. J. Fregly the American Physiological Society's Handbook of Physiology, Sec. 4, Environmental Physiology, vols. 1 & 2, and in 1998 he co-authored and edited the textbook, Physiology and Pathophysiology of Temperature Regulation, noted as containing "all essential aspects of human thermoregulation". His work in the 1990s and 2000s continued to focus on various mechanisms by which the body develops fevers, particularly with respect to the lipid compound prostaglandin E_{2} (PGE_{2}) and nitric oxide. Blatteis reported experimental results indicating that fever may be "induced by a mechanism that is independent of PGE_{2}", an outcome described as "heresy" according to the literature of the time, and leaving open questions for further investigation.

Blatties ultimately authored and/or co-authored three other books and over 200 original scientific articles and reviews. He was twice a senior Fulbright-Hays scholar, held numerous fellowships and visiting professorships abroad, and received several honoris causa diplomas. In 2003 he received the Honor Award from the Environmental and Exercise Physiology Section of the American Physiological Society, and in 2007 the society selected Blatteis to be profiled by their Living History in Physiology Project, recognizing "senior members who have made extraordinary contributions during their career to the advancement of the discipline and profession of physiology". He was elected a fellow of the American Physiological Society in 2019. Blatteis conducted research at the University of Tennessee for forty-two years, retiring from active research on October 1, 2008.

== Personal life ==
Blatteis met Yolanda Fuentes Barriga of Cusco, Peru, while they both were attending the University of Iowa. They were married in March 1958 and had three children. Yolanda died in 2018, and two-and-a-half years later Blatteis himself died in his sleep at his home at the age of 88.
