= Andreas Meyer-Hanno =

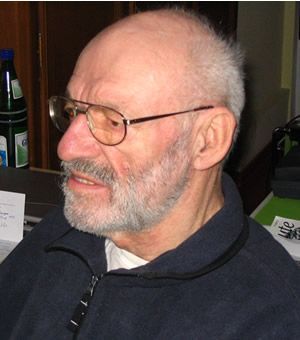
Andreas Meyer-Hanno.

Andreas Meyer-Hanno (18 February 1932 – 7 September 2006) was a German theater and opera director.

== Biography ==
Meyer-Hanno was born in Berlin. His parents were Hans Meyer-Hanno and Irene Sager. Since 1949 Meyer-Hanno studied music and theater. After university studies he worked between 1956 and 1964 at the Wuppertal Opera, where he became 1959 opera director. From 1964 to 1972 he worked as opera director in Karlsruhe at the Badisches Staatstheater Karlsruhe and then from 1972 to 1976 in Braunschweig at the Staatstheater Braunschweig. In 1980 he co-founded the LGBT organisation Homosexuelle Selbsthilfe (homosexual's self-help).

Meyer-Hanno became professor at the Hochschule für Musik und Darstellende Kunst Frankfurt am Main in 1976. He retired as professor in 1993. From 1989 to 1993 he helped to build the Frankfurter Engel in Frankfurt.

Meyer-Hanno died in Frankfurt. He was buried in the Alter St.-Matthäus-Kirchhof cemetery in Berlin.

== Honors ==
- Römer-Plakette of city Frankfurt am Main, 1993
- Price Rosa Courage in Osnabrück
- Bundesverdienstkreuz, 2000
