= Arnold Weiss =

American intelligence officer (1924–2010)

Arnold Hans Weiss
- Weiss circa 1945
- Born: Hans Arnold Wangersheim; July 25, 1924; Nuremberg, Germany
- Died: December 7, 2010 (aged 86); Rockville, Maryland, United States
- Military career
- Allegiance: United States of America
- Branch: United States Army Air Forces
- Service years: 1942–1946
- Conflicts: World War II
- Other work: United States Department of the Treasury Employee; Established Inter-American Development Bank

Arnold Hans Weiss (July 25, 1924 – December 7, 2010) was a German-born refugee from Nazi Germany who emigrated to the United States, where he became an intelligence officer working for the Office of Strategic Services during World War II. He played a key role in the discovery of the last will and testament of Adolf Hitler, which was dictated during the last days of the war in Europe and laid out the succession of leadership following his impending suicide, as the Red Army overtook Berlin and encircled the Führerbunker.

== Early life ==
Born in Nuremberg as Hans Arnold Wangersheim on July 25, 1924, he grew up in an orphanage after being placed there as a child following the divorce of his parents. A Jewish organization arranged for him to be sent to a family in Janesville, Wisconsin when he was 13 years old. Both of his parents escaped from Germany on their own, his father to Brazil, while his mother also emigrated to the U.S. He attended the University of Wisconsin–Madison and changed his surname to match that of Howard Weiss, a star football player for the school's football team.

== Military career ==
Weiss served in the United States Army Air Forces during World War II, but his training as a tail gunner ended when the plane he was in crashed and severely injured his legs. His ability to speak the German language led to his being recruited by the O.S.S. for service in Germany. Serving with the Counterintelligence Corps in the months following the fall of Nazi Germany, Weiss questioned many members of the Nazi hierarchy in advance of their trials. Weiss's unit was given the responsibility of confirming Adolf Hitler's death, and together with Hugh Trevor-Roper located Wilhelm Zander, who had been Martin Bormann's adjutant, using information that had been obtained by contacting members of his family. While being questioned, Zander described the circumstances in Hitler's Berlin bunker in the last days before he committed suicide. Under interrogation, Zander disclosed that he had been sent out of the bunker in order to transport a series of documents, which included an attestation to Hitler's marriage to Eva Braun. Also among the documents that were recovered was Hitler's last will and testament, which named Bormann as his executor and was later introduced as evidence during the Nuremberg Trials. Weiss was awarded the Commendation Medal for his role in "apprehending a personality high in the annals of the Nazi system". Another soldier, Herman Rothman, made a claim in a 2009 book that Hitler's will had been located months earlier than the date based on Weiss's account, and a book by Hugh Trevor-Roper made no mention of Weiss or of his role in uncovering Hitler's will.

== Military awards ==
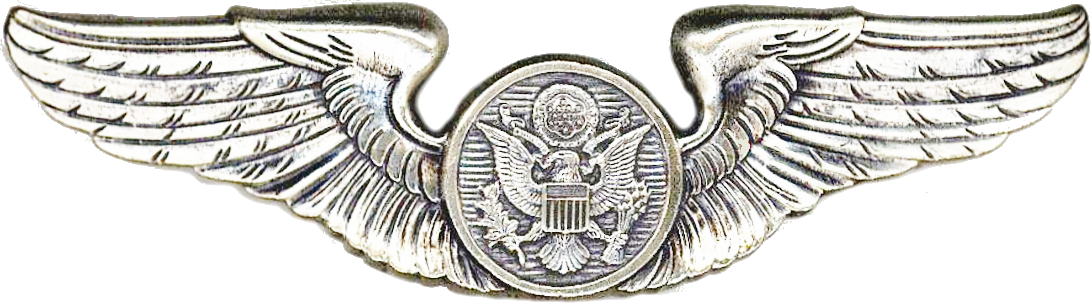

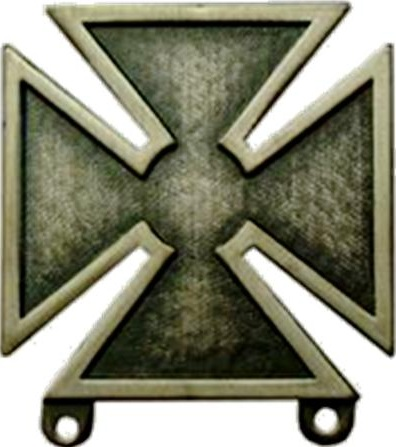

Aircrew Badge
Bronze Star Medal
Purple Heart Medal	Good Conduct Medal	American Defense Service Medal
American Campaign Medal	European-African-Middle Eastern Campaign Medal	World War II Victory Medal
Marksmanship Badge

== Later life ==
After returning to the United States after completing his military service, Weiss earned a degree in law at the University of Wisconsin Law School and worked for the United States Department of the Treasury, where he participated in the establishment of the Inter-American Development Bank.

A resident of Chevy Chase, Maryland, Weiss died at the age of 86 due to pneumonia in Rockville, Maryland on December 7, 2010.
