= Barbara Noack =

German writer (1924–2022)

Barbara Noack (28 September 1924 – 20 December 2022) was a German writer.

== Publications ==
- Valentine heißt man nicht!, Darmstadt 1954
- Die Zürcher Verlobung, Berlin 1955
- Italienreise – Liebe inbegriffen, Berlin 1957
- Oh diese Babys, Frankfurt am Main 1960 (zusammen mit Bernd Lohse und Eugen Saska-Weiß)
- Ein gewisser Herr Ypsilon, Berlin 1961
- Geliebtes Scheusal, Berlin 1963
- Danziger Liebesgeschichte, Berlin 1964
- Was halten Sie vom Mondschein?, Berlin 1966
- … und flogen achtkantig aus dem Paradies, Berlin 1969
- Eines Knaben Phantasie hat meistens schwarze Knie, Berlin 1971
- Der Bastian, München 1974 (nach dem Drehbuch 1973)
- Ferien sind schöner, München 1974
- Kann ich noch ein bißchen bleiben?, Berlin 1975
- Liebesgeschichten, München 1975
- Das kommt davon, wenn man verreist, München 1977
- Auf einmal sind sie keine Kinder mehr oder Die Zeit am See, München 1978
- Flöhe hüten ist leichter. Illustrationen: Peter Schimmel, München 1980
- Kleine Diplomaten, Freiburg im Breisgau 1981
- Drei sind einer zuviel, München 1982
- Eine Handvoll Glück, München 1982
- Ferienzeit, München 1983
- Ich wünsche dir …, München 1983
- So muß es wohl im Paradies gewesen sein, München 1984
- Ein Stück vom Leben, München 1984
- Ein Platz an der Sonne, München 1985
- Der Zwillingsbruder, München 1988
- Brombeerzeit, München 1992
- Glück und was sonst noch zählt, München 1993
- Jennys Geschichte, München 1999
- Die schönsten Geschichten, München 2001
- Die schönsten Kindergeschichten, München 2009
