= Hans Feldmeier =

German pharmacist (1924–2025)

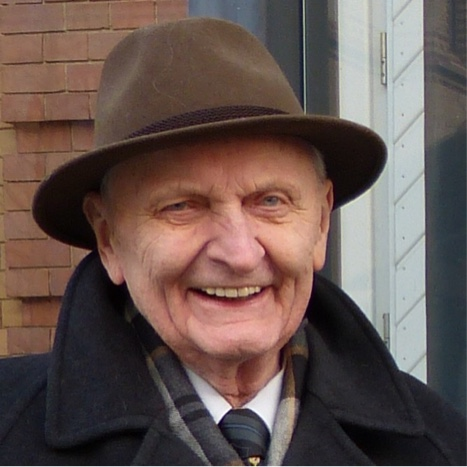
- Feldmeier in 2021
- Born: 24 July 1924; Hanover, Germany
- Died: 21 August 2025 (aged 101)
- Education: University of Rostock
- Occupation: Pharmacist

Hans Feldmeier (24 July 1924 – 21 August 2025) was a German pharmacist, who held a leading regional position in Rostock, Germany.

== Life and work ==
Feldmeier was born in Hanover on 24 July 1924. He grew up in Wittenberg. He served in Arbeitsdienst and Wehrmacht during World War II. After the war, he began a career in pharmacy by practical work at the Löwenapotheke in Wittenberg. He studied medicine at the University of Rostock from 1948 to 1952, took the state examination in 1950, and earned a doctorate in 1953 with his dissertation On the representation of some amines of the quinoline series and their carboxylase effect on α-keto acids. He carried out the work on this under the supervision of Wolfgang Langenbeck at the Rostock Institute for Catalysis Research. From 1954 he was head of the St. Georg Pharmacy in Rostock, from 1961 district pharmacist of the city and the district of Rostock. He was thus responsible for the patient care of all pharmacies in the district. From 1960 to 1984, he held the position of district pharmacist for social security. From 1985 to 1989 he was director of the Pharmaceutical Center Rostock. He received the honorary title of senior pharmacist in the GDR and was co-founder and former secretary of the Scheele Society, the Mecklenburg-Western Pomerania regional group of the German Pharmaceutical Society (DPhG). He was a member of the board of the Rostock Medical Society for several years. He worked on various committees, including the Pharmacopoeia Commission.

Feldmeier's commitment to consulting activities in the pharmacies of the GDR was of particular importance. His lecture "The Expert Discussion in the Pharmacy" at the conference of the Scheele Society in 1977, which was held under the theme "Pharmacist and Patient" met with a lively response. Feldmeier was the publisher of the "Rostock Pictogram Cards" designed with his team, which were used in 80 percent of GDR pharmacies. These cards contained a clear compilation of the consultation content for 550 finished medicinal products and specialities, and they had a short pharmacology on the back as a further development. The pictogram cards were very suitable for qualifying the patient discussions. These ideas, the development of information compositions for counselling, which go back to the Czech university lecturer Vladimir Smečka, were later continued in several publications. Encouraged by information technology, such advisory aids have also found widespread application.

His monthly medical information – initially intended only for Rostock – was highly valued in medical circles and beyond for 23 years because of its brevity and conciseness. In addition to information on the range of medicines, the "supply situation in keywords" for bridging defects, tabular overviews and, last but not least, feuilletonistic extras such as Pharmacia ridens, -criminalistica, -historica, -oeconomica were of particular interest. The two pages of the 1500 copies required a printing permit and the note "For official use only".

Feldmeier described in detail the supply of medicines during the GDR era, the work in his environment. "The district of Rostock increasingly took on a role model role when it came to the professional work of pharmacists and the academic penetration of pharmaceutical practice, not least in the implementation of a scientifically based medical prescription method and territorial prescription standards."

In 2012, he made headlines by eating a tin of 64 year old Lard from the United States.

The Medal of Rostock's Pharmacy System, an award for meritorious pharmacists and other personalities, was presented by him personally for many years – even after reunification. Feldmeier also published on the history of the origin of the Medal of Honour.

Feldmeier died on 21 August 2025, at the age of 101.
