= Günter Sawitzki =

German footballer (1932–2020)

Personal information
- Date of birth: 22 November 1932
- Place of birth: Herne, Germany
- Date of death: 14 December 2020 (aged 88)
- Height: 1.82 m (6 ft 0 in)
- Position: Goalkeeper

Youth career
- Rasensport 1927 Holthausen

Senior career*
Years	Team	Apps	(Gls)
1952–1956	SV Sodingen^{(OL West)}	7	(0)
1956–1963	VfB Stuttgart^{(OL Süd)}		
1963–1971	VfB Stuttgart^{(BL)}	146	(0)

International career
1956–1963	West Germany	10	(0)
- * Club domestic league appearances and goals

Günter Sawitzki (22 November 1932 – 14 December 2020) was a German football player.

== Career ==
Sawitzki's performances for underdog side SV Sodingen in the then best German division caught the attention of West German coach Sepp Herberger and made Sawitzki a proposed rival to Heinz Kwiatkowski and Fritz Herkenrath for the role as Toni Turek's successor in the West German goal. Before Sawitzki left tiny Sodingen, who had finished third in Germany in 1955, to join VfB Stuttgart in 1956, he had already played in two games for West Germany. Sawitzki's biggest success as a player was winning the West German Cup in 1958 with Stuttgart.

Sticking with Bundesliga side VfB Stuttgart for the rest of his career, the goalkeeper was in the squads of West Germany at the 1958 FIFA World Cup and 1962 FIFA World Cup, although he remained reserve on both occasions. Until 1963 he won ten caps.

== Honours ==
- 1958 FIFA World Cup fourth place
