= Jakob Arjouni =

German author (1964–2013)

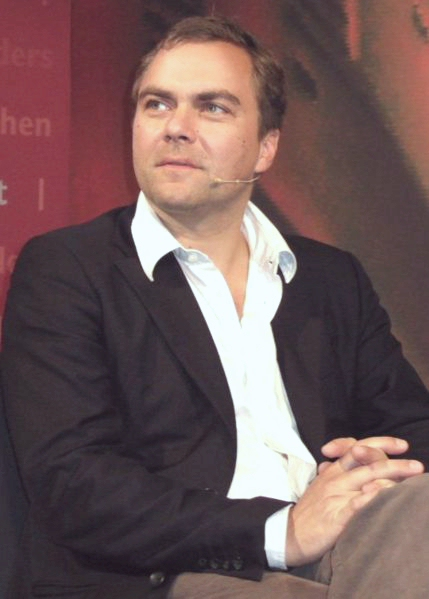
Jakob Arjouni

Jakob Bothe (born Jakob Michelsen; 8 October 1964 – 17 January 2013), better known by his pen name Jakob Arjouni, was a German author. He received the 1992 German Crime Fiction Prize for One Man, One Murder.

== Life ==
Jakob Arjouni was born in Frankfurt am Main. His first novel Happy Birthday, Türke! was published in 1985. This was the first in his Kayankaya series of crime novels, featuring private detective Kemal Kayankaya, and set in Frankfurt am Main where Arjouni resided. The series brought him recognition both in Germany and abroad: the books were translated into 10 different languages. In 1987, he received the Baden-Württembergischen Autorenpreis für das deutschsprachige Jugendtheater for his play Nazim schiebt ab. In 1992, he received the German Crime Fiction Prize for One Man, One Murder. He died, aged 48, in Berlin of pancreatic cancer.

== Themes of his works ==
Most of Arjouni's works are written with a sharp eye for the experiences of the outsider, often but not exclusively in the context of German society. His most famous protagonist, the private detective, Kemal Kayankaya was born in Turkey but having been adopted at a very young age and brought up by a German family is, apart from his appearance culturally German and despite the repeated expectations of those he meets, in fact relatively unfamiliar with what it means to be Turkish. He only speaks the German language. In Magic Hoffmann, Hausaufgaben and Edelsmanns Tochter, Arjouni deals with rising nationalism, historical revisionism and anti-Semitism in post reunification Germany.

His novel Chez Max takes place in Paris in the year 2064 and describes a society subject to heavy state surveillance as a result of the 9/11 terrorist attacks. This novel has clear echoes of George Orwell's 1984.

In one of his last novels, Der heilige Eddy (2009), Arjouni departed from his previously serious themes and produced a lightweight contemporary picaresque piece. Peter Henning, a critic from the German newspaper Die Zeit, commented that it is written in "German screwball prose with 246 floating slightly staged pages". His thriller novel Cherryman jagt Mr. White (2011) has an 18-year-old protagonist in rural Brandenburg who has to face brutal violence by young Nazis of his own village. To overcome his subdued feelings, he turns them into the cartoon adventures of hero "Cherryman" and gangster "Mr. White".
