= Wolfram Dorn =

German politician

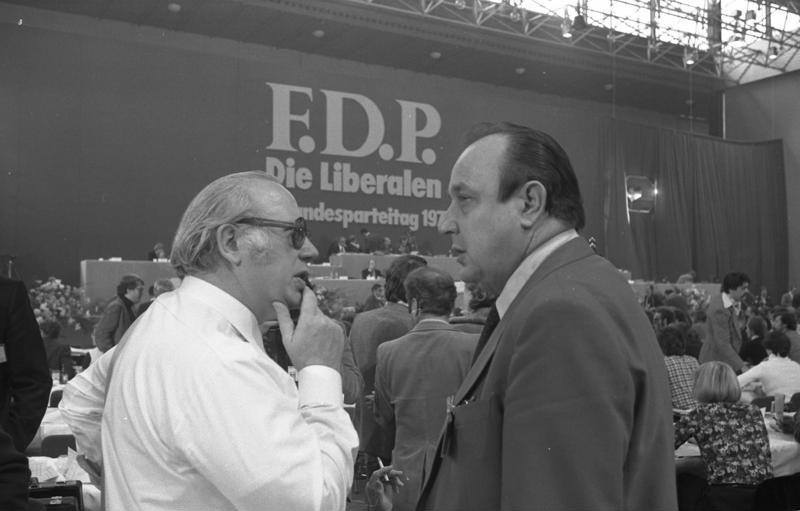
- Dorn with Genscher 1977

Member of the Bundestag for North Rhine-Westphalia
- In office 17 October 1961 – 22 September 1972
- Constituency: FDP List

Personal details
- Born: 18 July 1924 Altena, Free State of Prussia, Germany
- Died: 17 June 2014 (aged 89) Halver, North Rhine-Westphalia, Germany
- Party: FDP

Wolfram Dorn (18 July 1924 – 17 June 2014) was a German politician of the Free Democratic Party (FDP) and former member of the German Bundestag.

== Life ==
From 1954 to 1961, from 1975 to 1980 and from 1985 to 1995 he was a member of the state parliament of North Rhine-Westphalia.

From 1961 to 1972 he was a member of the German Bundestag. From 1969 to 1972, Dorn served as Parliamentary State Secretary to the Federal Minister of the Interior. From 1962 to 1968 he was chairman of the FDP parliamentary working group on domestic policy and from 1968 to 1969 deputy chairman of the FDP parliamentary group.

Dorn always entered the Bundestag via the North Rhine-Westphalia state list.

== Literature ==
Herbst, Ludolf; Jahn, Bruno (2002). Vierhaus, Rudolf (ed.). Biographisches Handbuch der Mitglieder des Deutschen Bundestages. 1949–2002 [Biographical Handbook of the Members of the German Bundestag. 1949–2002] (in German). München: De Gruyter - De Gruyter Saur. p. 1715. ISBN 978-3-11-184511-1.
