= Heiko Bellmann =

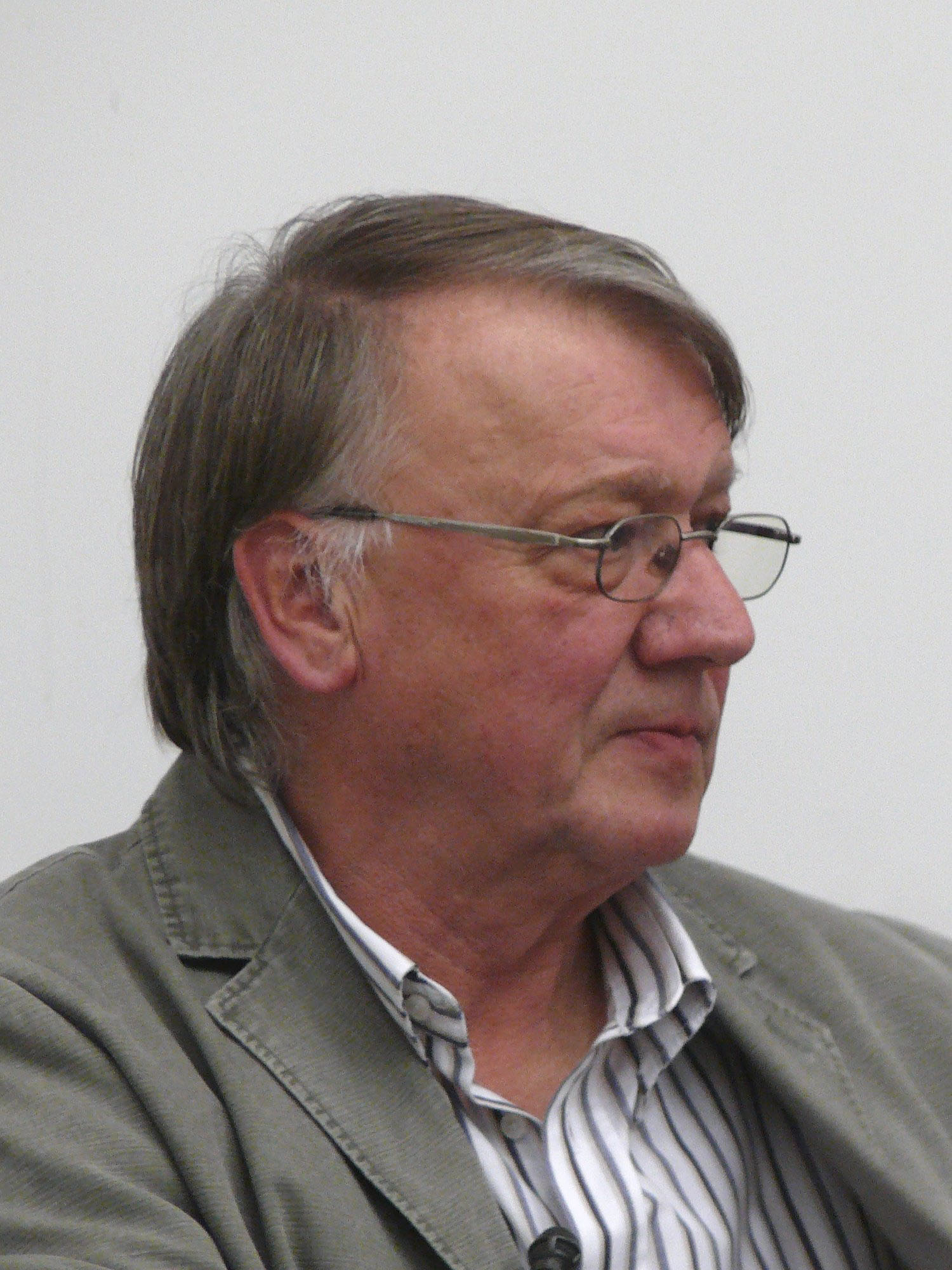
Bellmann on 13 March 2010.

Heiko Bellmann (17 March 1950 – 7 March 2014) was a German biologist, writer, zoologist and photographer. He published over fifty books.

Bellmann died on 7 March 2014 at the age of 63.

== Other websites ==
- Official website (in German)
