= Freie Presse (Saxony) =

German regional daily newspaper

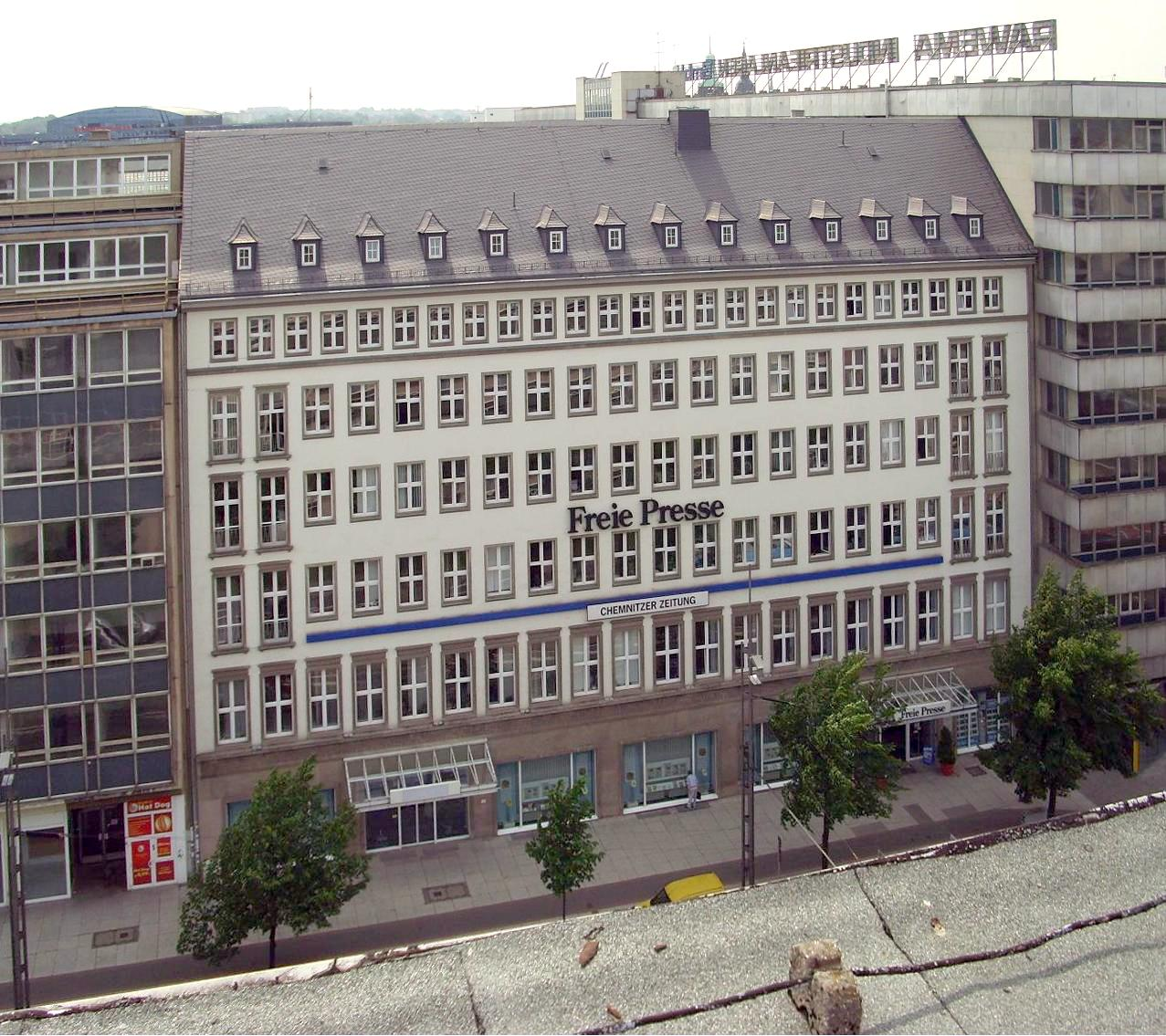
- Sachsens Größte Zeitung; Saxony's Largest Newspaper
- Type: Daily newspaper
- Format: Nordisch
- Publisher: Chemnitzer Verlag
- Founded: 20 May 1946; 79 years ago
- Language: German
- Headquarters: Chemnitz
- Circulation: 213,845 (2019)
- Website: www.freiepresse.de

The Freie Presse (German for Free Press) is a regional daily newspaper in the Chemnitz region, Germany.

== History and profile ==
Freie Presse was first published in 1946. The paper is published by the Chemnitzer Verlag in Nordisch format and has its headquarters in Chemnitz.

Prior to German reunification, the paper was the largest regional daily newspaper in East Germany, with a circulation of 663,700. During the third quarter of 1992 the circulation of Freie Presse was 522,000 copies. In 2001 the paper had a circulation of 401,000 copies. Its 2002 circulation was 376,681 copies.

Freie Presse was the best-selling newspaper in Saxony with a circulation of 277,221 copies in the second quarter of 2011, according to IVW. In the fourth quarter of 2019 the paper had a circulation of 213,845 copies.
