= Heinz Schenk =

German television moderator and actor

Heinz Schenk (11 December 1924 – 1 May 2014) was a German television moderator and actor. He was born in Mainz.

== Life ==
Since 1951 Schenk worked for Hessischer Rundfunk as television moderator. In Germany he became famous for his television show Zum Blauen Bock. The show, which started under host Otto Höpfner, ran under Schenk from 1966 to 1987. He died in Wiesbaden, aged 89.
