= List of people from Stuttgart =

The following is a list containing people both born in Stuttgart and notable residents of the city, ordered chronologically.

== Artists ==
Image	Name	Date born	Date died	Notes
	Balduin Hoyoul	1547 or 1548	26 November 1594	Composer
	Paul Peuerl	13 June 1570	After 1625	Organist, organ builder, composer
	Georg Rudolf Weckherlin	15 September 1584	13 February 1653	Poet and diplomat.
	Johann Jakob Froberger	19 May 1616	7 May 1667	Composer, keyboard virtuoso, organist
	Charles Theodore Pachelbel	24 November 1690	15 September 1750	Composer, organist, harpsichordist
	Dorothea Wendling	21 March 1736	20 August 1811	Soprano
	Karl Friedrich Abt	1743	20 November 1783	Actor
	Reinhard Heinrich Ferdinand Fischer	18 June 1746	25 June 1813	Architect
	Johann Heinrich von Dannecker	October 16, 1758	December 8, 1841	Sculptor.
	Nicolas Lupot	4 December 1758	14 August 1824	Violin maker
	Johann Andreas Streicher	13 December 1761	25 May 1833	Pianist, composer, piano maker
	Eberhard Georg Friedrich von Wächter	29 February 1762	14 August 1852	Painter.
	Gustav Friedrich Hetsch	28 September 1788	7 September 1864	Architect
	Carl Alexander Heideloff	2 February 1789	28 September 1865	Architect.
	Gustav Schwab	19 June 1792	4 November 1850	Writer, pastor, publisher
	Emilie Zumsteeg	9 December 1796	1 August 1857	Choir conductor, songwriter, composer, pianist
	Charlotte Birch-Pfeiffer	23 June 1800	25 August 1868	Actress.
	Victor Aimé Huber	10 March 1800	19 July 1869	Social reformer, travel writer, literary historian
	Wilhelm Hauff	29 November 1802	18 November 1827	Poet, novelist.
	Julius Benedict	27 November 1804	5 June 1885	Composer and conductor.
	Therese von Lützow	4 July 1804	16 September 1852	Noblewoman and writer.
	Gustav Pfizer	1807	1890	Poet and lyrist.
	Hermann Ploucquet	12 April 1816	16 February 1878	Taxidermist and naturalist.
	Georg Herwegh	31 May 1817	7 April 1875	Poet.
	Wilhelm Hertz	24 September 1835	7 January 1902	Writer
	Frederick Leypoldt	17 November 1835	31 March 1884	Bibliographer
Adolf Kröner (around 1900)	Gustav Adolf Kröner	26 May 1836	29 January 1911	Publisher
	Julius Ruthardt	13 December 1841	13 October 1909	Violinist, composer
	Louis Welden Hawkins	1 July 1849	1 May 1910	Painter
	Isolde Kurz	21 December 1853	5 April 1944	Poet, writer
	Cäsar Flaischlen	12 May 1864	16 October 1920	Poet
	Theodor Bertram	12 February 1869	24 November 1907	Opera singer
	Otto Treßler	13 April 1871	27 April 1965	Actor
	Johannes Baader	22 June 1875	15 January 1955	Architect, writer, artist
	Fritz Lang	15 March 1877	26 October 1961	Painter
	Ludwig Dürr	4 June 1878	1 January 1956	Airship designer
	Alfred Roth	27 April 1879	9 October 1948	Politician, writer
	Alfred Fischer	29 August 1881	10 April 1950	Architect
	Paul Leni	8 July 1885	2 September 1929	Filmmaker
	Otto Wunderlich	1886	1975	Photographer
	Bruno Frank	13 June 1887	20 June 1945	Author, poet, dramatist, humanist
	Oskar Schlemmer	4 September 1888	13 April 1943	Painter, sculptor, choreographer
	Willi Baumeister	22 January 1889	31 August 1955	Painter, scenic designer, art professor, typographer
	C. Paul Jennewein	2 December 1890	22 February 1978	Sculptor
	Carl Jules Weyl	6 December 1890	12 July 1941	Art director, soldier
	Fred Uhlman	19 January 1901	11 April 1985	Writer, painter, lawyer
	Werner Klingler	23 October 1903	23 June 1972	Film director, actor
	Kurt Schumacher	6 May 1905	22 December 1942	Sculptor, communist, member of the German resistance to Nazism
	Will Eisenmann	3 March 1906	20 August 1992	Composer
	Eberhard Koebel	22 June 1907	31 August 1955	Youth leader, writer, publisher
	Trude Eipperle	27 January 1908	18 October 1997	Operatic soprano
	Gerda Taro	1 August 1910	26 July 1997	War photographer
	Anni Schaad	10 December 1911	20 December 1988	Jewelry designer
	Richard Holm	3 August 1912	20 July 1988	Operatic tenor
	Hermann Lenz	26 February 1913	12 May 1998	Poet, author, novelist
	Alfred Vohrer	29 December 1914	3 February 1986	Film director, actor
	Alfred Weidenmann	10 May 1916	9 June 2000	Film director, screenwriter
	Heinz Weiss	12 June 1921	20 November 2010	Actor
	Fritz Umgelter	18 August 1922	9 May 1981	Television director, television writer, film director
	Dieter Eppler	11 February 1927	12 April 2008	Actor
	Joachim Fuchsberger	11 March 1927	11 September 2014	Actor, television presenter, lyricist, businessman, activist, paratrooper
	Wolf Kahn	4 October 1927	15 March 2020	Painter
	Ernst Mahle	3 January 1929	—	Composer, conductor
	Fred Herzog	21 September 1930	9 September 2019	Photographer
	Werner Haas	3 March 1931	11 October 1976	Pianist
	Michael Pfleghar	20 March 1933	23 June 1991	Film director, screenwriter
	Helmuth Rilling	29 May 1933	—	Conductor
	Wolfgang Dauner	30 December 1935	10 January 2020	Jazz fusion pianist, composer, keyboardist
	Helmut Lachenmann	27 November 1935	—	Composer
	Ferdinand Alexander Porsche	11 December 1935	5 April 2012	Car designer
	Walter Stöhrer	15 January 1937	10 April 2000	Painter
	Eberhard Schoener	13 May 1938	—	Composer, conductor, arranger, keyboardist
	Hartmut Geerken	15 January 1939	21 October 2021	Musician, composer, writer, journalist, playwright, filmmaker
	Bettina Kupfer	19 July 1963	—	Actress, writer

=== Artists (continued) ===
- Hans Schumm (1896–1990), film actor
- Jörg Faerber (1929–2022), conductor
- Wolfgang Kermer (born 1935), art historian, art pedagogue
- Veronika Bayer (1940–2008), actress
- Eberhard Weber (born 1940), double bassist and composer
- Klaus Zehelein (born 1940), opera intendant
- Wolfgang Kramer (born 1942), board game designer
- Rolf Schübel (born 1942), film director and screenwriter
- Friedman Paul Erhardt (1943–2007), early television chef
- Jerry Zaks (born 1946), stage and television director and actor
- Andrea Rau (born 1947), actress and producer
- Anna Thomas (born 1948), film screenwriter, film producer and writer
- Manfred Wagner (born 1948), author of Wagner model
- Hermann Kopp (born 1954), composer and musician
- Horst von Saurma (born 1954), chief editor of the German automobile magazine Sport auto
- Jeff Dahl (born 1955), musician
- Tomas Kurth (born 1955), visual artist / sculptor / musician.
- Roland Emmerich (born 1955), film director, screenwriter and producer
- Ralf Illenberger (born 1956), guitarist
- Peter Schilling (born 1956), synthpop musician
- Kiddy Citny (born 1957), artist and musician
- Uwe Grodd (born 1958), conductor and flutist
- Nikolai Müllerschön (born 1958), film director, producer and screenwriter
- Geoff Tate (born 1959), singer and musician
- Greg Iles (1960–2025), novelist
- Claudia Neidig (born 1960), actress
- Eytan Pessen (born 1961), pianist and opera director
- Susanne Lewis (born 1962), American musician, songwriter and artist
- Alex Jolig (born 1963), actor, singer and motorcycle racer
- Angela Laich (born 1963), sculptor, draughtsperson and painter
- Steffen Lehmann (born 1963), architect and urban designer
- Denis Scheck (born 1964), literary critic and journalist
- Christian Dierstein (born 1965), percussionist and academic teacher
- Mark Landler (born 1965), journalist
- Alexander Bader (born 1965), clarinetist
- Jürgen Mayer (born 1965), architect and artist
- Judith Kaufmann (born 1962), cinematographer
- Sandra Hastenteufel (born 1966), artist
- Stefan-Peter Greiner (born 1966), violin maker
- Klaus Schedl (born 1966), composer
- Michael Beck (born 1967), member of the German hip hop group Die Fantastischen Vier
- Natalia Wörner (born 1967), actress
- Robert Schwentke (born 1968), film director
- Markus Amm (born 1969), artist
- Ulrike Frank (born 1969), actress
- Jerri Manthey (born 1970), actress
- Matthias Rexroth (born 1970), countertenor
- Thom Barron (born 1971), pornographic actor
- Chris Bosse (born 1971), architect
- Lisa Martinek (born 1972), actress
- Carmen Vincelj (born 1972), professional dancer
- Reggie Watts (born 1972), musician
- Christopher Bauder (born 1973), interaction designer and media artist
- André Butzer (born 1973), artist
- Max Herre (born 1973), musician
- Florian Maier-Aichen (born 1973), landscape photographer
- Matthias Megyeri (born 1973), designer of security products
- Marc C. Woehr (born 1973), contemporary artist
- Melina Aslanidou (born 1974). Greek musician
- Dragan Espenschied (born 1975), media artist
- Nina Hoss (born 1975), actress
- Martin Pfeifle (born 1975), sculptor
- Tanja Liedtke (born 1977), professional dancer
- Tanja Becker-Bender (born 1978), violinist
- Haha (born 1979), singer
- Simone Simons (born 1985), singer
- Alexander Tuschinski (born 1988), film director
- VENUES (formed 2015), post-hardcore band
- Pia Wurtzbach (born 1989), Miss Universe 2015 for the Philippines
- Yoon So-hee (born 1993), South Korean actress
- Mailin Hübler current mayor

== Athletes ==
- Julius Frey (1881–1960), swimmer
- Karl Burger (1883–1959), amateur football player and manager
- Fred Gaiser (1885–1918), pitcher for the St. Louis Cardinals
- Otto Merz (1889–1933), chauffeur, race car driver, test driver and mechanic
- Otto Fahr (1892–1969), backstroke swimmer
- Christian Werner (1892–1932), racecar driver
- Wolf Hirth (1900–1959), gliding pioneer and sailplane designer
- Martin Schempp (1905–1984), glider pilot
- Helmut Schäfer (1908–1994), weightlifter
- Hermann Lang (1909–1987), champion race car driver
- Erwin Bauer (1912–1958), Formula One driver
- Rudi Fischer (1912–1976), racing driver
- Hermann Pilnik (1914–1981), chess Grandmaster
- Kurt Adolff (1921–2012), racing driver
- Robert Schlienz (1924–1995), football player
- Hans Herrmann (born 1928), race car driver
- Michael May (born 1934), race car driver
- Günter Klass (1936–1967), race car driver
- Dieter Glemser (born 1938), touring car racing driver
- Marlinde Massa (1944–2014), field hockey player
- Horst Köppel (born 1948), footballer and football manager
- Hans Lutz (born 1949), track cyclist and road bicycle racer
- Rolf Ziegler (born 1951), athlete
- Harry Gauss (1952–2009), football coach
- Rainer Adrion (born 1953), footballer and football manager
- Almut Lehmann (born 1953), pair skater
- Walter Kelsch (born 1955), footballer
- Bernd Martin (born 1955), footballer
- Elmar Borrmann (born 1957), fencer
- Dominic Dobson (born 1957), CART and Craftsman Truck Series driver
- Hansi Müller (born 1957), footballer and supervisory board member of VfB Stuttgart
- Mark Adickes (born 1961), American football player
- Ed Reynolds (born 1961), American football player
- John Alt (born 1962), American football player
- Rainer Kraft (born 1962), football coach
- Andreas Müller (born 1962), football player
- Martin Schwalb (born 1963), handball player
- Beate Bühler (born 1964), volleyball player
- Jürgen Evers (born 1964), sprinter
- Anja Langer (born 1965), professional bodybuilder
- Christina Riegel (born 1965), figure skater
- Michael Spies (born 1965), footballer
- Thomas Stickroth (born 1965), footballer
- Vincenzo Nardiello (born 1966), boxer
- Dietmar Haaf (born 1967), long jumper
- Jürgen Klopp (born 1967), footballer and football manager
- Eberhard Trautner (born 1967), footballer
- Dimitrios Moutas (born 1968), footballer
- Marco Kurz (born 1969), footballer and coach
- Bernhard Rühling (born 1969), rower
- Kim Bauermeister (born 1970), runner
- Franziska Hentschel (born 1970), field hockey player
- Jens Keller (born 1970), footballer and football manager
- Sascha Fischer (born 1971), rugby union player
- Markus Lösch (born 1971), footballer
- Tayfun Korkut (born 1974), footballer
- David Montero (born 1974), footballer
- Roberto D'Aversa (born 1975), footballer
- Roberto Pinto (born 1978), footballer
- Oliver Barth (born 1979), footballer
- Sead Ramović (born 1979), footballer
- Marc Lieb (born 1980), race car driver
- Markus Winkelhock (born 1980), racing driver
- Michael Berrer (born 1980), tennis player
- Maren Baumbach (born 1981), handball player
- Savvas Exouzidis (born 1981), footballer
- Simon Greul (born 1981), tennis player
- David Yelldell (born 1981), American footballer
- Oliver Stierle (born 1983), footballer
- Svenja Bazlen (born 1984), triathlete
- Patrick Milchraum (born 1984), footballer
- Nina Wengert (born 1984), rower
- Nadine Hildebrand (born 1987), track and field athlete
- Sami Khedira (born 1987), footballer
- Johannes Theobald (born 1987), racing driver
- Jonas Deichmann (born 1987), German adventurer and ultra-endurance athlete.
- Patrick Hager (born 1988), ice hockey player
- Maylin Hausch (born 1988), pair skater
- Aggelos Komvolidis (born 1988), footballer
- Julian Leist (born 1988), footballer
- Katrin Reinert (born 1988), rower
- Michael Schick (born 1988), footballer
- Kağan Söylemezgiller (born 1988), footballer
- Fernando Raposo (born 1989), basketball player
- Joselu (born 1990), footballer
- Teoman Örge (born 1990), basketball player
- Panagiotis Vlachodimos (born 1991), footballer
- Bernard Tomic (born 1992), tennis player
- Serge Gnabry (born 1995), professional footballer
- Timo Werner (born 1996), professional footballer
- Jean-Philippe Krasso (born 1997), professional footballer
- Jamal Musiala (born 2003), professional footballer

== Business people ==
- Salomon Idler (1610–1669), shoemaker
- Johann Friedrich Cotta (1764–1832), publisher, industrial pioneer and politician.
- Robert Schlumberger von Goldeck (1814–1879), entrepreneur
- Charles Rasp (1846–1907), businessman
- Hermann Eckstein (1847–1893), magnate and banker
- Fritz Mannheimer (1890–1939), banker
- Theodor Koch (1905–1976), German engineer and weapons manufacturer
- Berthold Leibinger (1930–2018), engineer, entrepreneur and philanthropist
- Heinz Dürr (born 1933), entrepreneur and stockholder
- Ulrich Bez (born 1943), businessman
- Matthias Rath (born 1955), doctor, businessman and vitamin entrepreneur
- Dominik Brunner (1959–2009), businessman
- Martin Brudermüller (born 1961), businessman, CEO of BASF

== Lawyers ==
Image	Name	Date born	Date died	Notes
	Johann Jakob Moser	18 January 1701	30 September 1785	Jurist.
	Robert von Mohl	17 August 1799	4 November 1875	Jurist
	Max Bodenheimer	12 March 1865	19 July 1940	Lawyer
	Arnulf Klett	8 April 1905	14 August 1974	Lawyer and politician, former mayor of Stuttgart
	Berthold Schenk Graf von Stauffenberg	15 March 1905	10 August 1944	Aristocrat, lawyer and member of the 20 July plot
	Rosalie Abella	1 July 1946	—	Jurist
	Ferdinand Oliver Porsche	13 March 1961	—	Lawyer

== Military ==
- Maximilian Emanuel of Württemberg-Winnental (1689–1709), volunteer soldier in the army of Charles XII of Sweden
- Jean Chrétien Fischer (1713–1762), soldier
- Rudolf Veiel (1883–1956), general
- Wilhelm Boger (1906–1977), police commissioner and concentration camp overseer
- Wilhelm Herget (1910–1974), night fighter flying ace in the Luftwaffe
- Rainer Hildebrandt (1914–2004), anti-communist resistance fighter and historian
- Helmut Belser (1915–1942), Luftwaffe ace
- Helmut Hirsch (1916–1937), student and resistance member
- Hans Götz (1919–1943), Luftwaffe ace
- Herbert Berrer (1921–1992), one man torpedo driver
- Angelika Speitel (born 1952), member of the Red Army Faction

=== Officers ===
- Henry Frederick of Württemberg-Winnental (1687–1734), general
- Frederick Louis of Württemberg-Winnental (1690–1734), army commander
- August of Württemberg (1813–1885), Royal Prussian Colonel General
- Walther Reinhardt (1872–1930), officer
- Hermann Geyer (1882–1946), General der Infanterie in the Wehrmacht during World War II
- Rudolf Veiel (1883–1956), General of the Panzertruppe during World War II
- Christian Wirth (1885–1944), Nazi SS concentration camp commander involved in the Action T4 program and Operation Reinhard
- Dietrich Kraiß (1889–1944), Generalleutnant during World War II
- Rudolf von Bünau (1890–1962), general
- Walther Fischer von Weikersthal (1890–1953), General der Infanterie in the Wehrmacht during World War II
- Albert Buck (1895–1962), Generalmajor in the Wehrmacht during World War II
- Heinrich Eberbach (1895–1992), General der Panzertruppe in World War II
- Herbert Wagner (1896–1968), Generalleutnant in the Wehrmacht during World War II
- Günther Gumprich (1900–1943), Naval captain of the Kaiserliche Marine, Reichsmarine and Kriegsmarine
- Hermann Plocher (1901–1980), Luftwaffe commander during World War II
- Herbert Kappler (1907–1978), head of German police in Rome during World War II
- Hans Endreß (1911–1969), Hauptsturmführer (Captain) in the Waffen SS
- Walter Harzer (1912–1982), Waffen-SS officer
- Rudolf Böhmler (1914–1968), Oberst in the Fallschirmjäger during World War II
- Wilhelm Spindler (1914–1997), Oberst in the Wehrmacht during World War II
- Rudolf von Bünau (1915–1943), Major in the Wehrmacht during World War II
- Heinz Haag (1918–1994), Schnellboot commander in World War II
- Günther Hilt (1918–1944), Major in the Wehrmacht during World War II
- Wilhelm Bäder (1922–1945), Oberleutnant der Reserve in the Wehrmacht during World War II

== Scholars ==
- Georg Bernhard Bilfinger (1693–1750), philosopher, mathematician and statesman
- Ludwig Timotheus Spittler (1752–1810), historian
- Marianne Ehrmann (1755–1795), one of the first women novelists and publicists in the German-speaking countries
- Georg Wilhelm Friedrich Hegel (1770–1831), philosopher.
- Julius von Mohl (1800–1876), Orientalist.
- Karl Christian Planck (1819–1880), philosopher.
- Rudolf von Roth (1821–1895), Indologist, founder of the Vedic philology.
- Karl Mauch (1837–1875), explorer and African geographer
- Friedrich Hauser (1859–1917), archaeologist and art historian
- Hermann Abert (1871–1927), music historian
- Max Horkheimer (1895–1973), philosopher-sociologist
- Alexander Schenk Graf von Stauffenberg (1905–1964), aristocrat, historian and member of the 20 July plot
- Edward Lowinsky (1908–1985), musicologist
- Karl Dietrich Bracher (1922–2016), political scientist and historian
- Herbert E. Brekle (1935–2018), typographer and linguist
- Frieder Nake (born 1938), professor for computer graphics
- Manfred Schneckenburger (1938–2019), art historian and curator
- Constance Grewe (born 1946), academic, author, and judge
- Gerhard Raff (born 1946), historian, editor and publisher
- John Thorn (born 1947), sports historian
- Phillip Longman (born 1956), demographer
- Claudia Schoppmann (born 1958), historian and author
- Andres Veiel (born 1959), film director and screenwriter
- Brigitte Fehrle (born 1960), journalist
- Michael Maar (born 1960), literary scholar and author
- Eric Hilgendorf (born 1960), professor of law
- Ralf Zerback (born 1961), historian and author

== Scientists ==
- Johann Friedrich Pfaff (1765–1825), mathematician
- Andreas Friedrich Bauer (1783–1860), engineer
- Carl Reichenbach (1788–1869), chemist, geologist, metallurgist, naturalist, industrialist and philosopher
- Christian Heinrich von Nagel (1803–1882), geometer
- Friedrich August von Alberti (1795–1878), geologist
- Hugo von Mohl (1805–1872), botanist.
- Karl Friedrich Wilhelm Berge (1811–1883), naturalist, ornithologist and entomologist
- Christian Ferdinand Friedrich Krauss (1812–1890), scientist, traveler and collector
- Johann Ludwig Karl Heinrich von Struve (1812–1898), astronomer
- Wilhelm Griesinger (1817–1868), neurologist and psychiatrist
- Wilhelm Roser (1817–1888), surgeon and ophthalmologist
- Carl Gustav Guckelberger (1820–1902), chemist
- Carl Gustav Calwer (1821–1874), entomologist
- Christian Zeller (1822–1899), mathematician
- Carl Wilhelm Heine (1838–1877), physician
- Wilhelm Camerer (1842–1910), physician
- Eugen Baumann (1846–1896), chemist
- Carl Magnus von Hell (1849–1926), chemist
- Otto Hölder (1859–1937), mathematician
- Wilhelm Weinberg (1862–1937), physician and obstetrician-gynecologist
- Hans Spemann (1869–1941), embryologist
- Friedrich Wilhelm Seiffer (1872–?), neurologist and psychiatrist
- Viktor von Weizsäcker (1886–1957), physician and physiologist
- Erich Huzenlaub (1888–1964), chemist
- Erich Schönhardt (1891–1979), mathematician
- Erwin Fues (1893–1970), physicist
- Paul Schlack (1897–1967), chemist
- Ernst Rexer (1902–1983), nuclear physicist
- Erich Zürn (1906–1965), U-boat engineer
- Fritz Leonhardt (1909–1999), structural engineer
- Karl Steinbuch (1917–2005), computer scientist, cyberneticist and electrical engineer
- Franz Sondheimer (1926–1981), chemist
- Rolf Landauer (1927–1999), physicist
- Hans-Peter Dürr (1929–2014), physicist
- Gerhard Ertl (born 1936), physicist
- Hartmut Elsenhans (born 1941), scientist
- Ulf Dietrich Merbold (born 1941), astronaut
- Knut Urban (born 1941), physicist
- Bert Sakmann (born 1942), cell physiologist
- Hans-Jörg Bullinger (born 1944), scientist
- Bernhard Mann (born 1950), social scientist
- David Robert Nelson (born 1951), physicist
- Rudi Studer (born 1951), computer scientist
- Rolf Schlierer (born 1955), physician, lawyer and politician
- Ulf Hohmann (born 1963), ethologist
- Christof Ebert (born 1964), computer scientist and author
- Gert Mittring (born 1966), mental calculator
- Patrick Cramer (born 1969), biochemist
- Shuman Ghosemajumder (born 1974), Canadian technologist, entrepreneur, and author
- Martin Reimann (born 1978), researcher

== Statesmen ==
- Eberhard I (1265–1325), Count of Württemberg
- Eberhard IV (1388–1419), Count of Württemberg
- Eberhard III (1614–1674), Duke of Württemberg
- Frederick (1615–1682), Duke of Württemberg
- William Louis (1647–1677), Duke of Württemberg
- Eberhard Louis (1676–1733), Duke of Württemberg
- Magdalena Wilhelmine of Württemberg (1677–1742), Margravine of Baden
- Charles Alexander of Württemberg (1684–1737), Duke of Württemberg
- Frederick II Eugene of Württemberg (1732–1797), Duke of Württemberg
- Auguste of Württemberg (1734–1787), Duchess of Württemberg
- Wilhelm of Urach (1810–1869), Duke of Urach
- Sophie of Württemberg (1818–1877), Queen of the Netherlands
- Charles I (1823–1891), King of Württemberg
- William II of Württemberg (1848–1921), King of Württemberg
- Christopher Gustavus Memminger (1803–1888), 1st C.S. Secretary of the Treasury
- Karl von Weizsäcker (1853–1926), politician
- Ernst von Weizsäcker (1882–1951), diplomat and politician
- Maria Walter (1895–1988), politician
- Heinrich Rau (1899–1961), politician
- Richard von Weizsäcker (1920–2015), politician and former President of Germany
- Kurt Gscheidle (1924–2003), politician
- Werner Ungerer (1927–2014), diplomat and civil servant
- Manfred Rommel (1928–2013), politician
- Manfred Abelein (1930–2008), politician
- Manfred Wörner (1934–1994), politician and diplomat
- Kurt Joachim Lauk (born 1946), politician
- Christel Haeck (born 1948), politician
- Rainer Arnold (born 1950), politician
- Günther Oettinger (born 1953), politician
- Jörg Tauss (born 1953), politician
- Constanze Angela Krehl (born 1956), politician
- Karin Binder (born 1957), politician
- Rainer Wieland (born 1957), politician
- Eric Abetz (born 1958), politician
- Axel Berg (born 1959), politician
- Volker Beck (born 1960), politician
- Tobias Pflüger (born 1965), politician
- Stefan Kaufmann (born 1969), politician
- Christian von Stetten (born 1970), businessman and politician

=== Royalty and nobility ===
- Anna of Württemberg (1561–1616), Princess of Württemberg
- Pauline of Württemberg (1810–1856), Princess of Württemberg
- Catherine of Württemberg (1821–1898), Princess of Württemberg
- Pauline of Saxe-Weimar-Eisenach (1852–1904), Princess of Saxe-Weimar-Eisenach
- Pauline of Württemberg (1877–1965), Princess of Württemberg
- Philipp Albrecht (1893–1975), member of the House of Württemberg
- Carl Alexander (1896–1964), member of the House of Württemberg
- Sophie, Duchess of Hohenberg (1868-1914), Married Archduke Franz Ferdinand

== Theologians ==
Image	Name	Date born	Date died	Notes
	Martin Eisengrein	28 December 1535	4 May 1578	Catholic theologian and polemical writer
	Johann Gottlieb Faber	8 March 1717	18 March 1779	Theologian and author
	Hermann Gundert	4 February 1814	25 April 1893	Missionary and scholar
	William Julius Mann	1819	1892	Theologian and author
	Karl Theodor Keim	17 December 1825	17 November 1878	Protestant theologian.

== Notable residents of Stuttgart ==
- Charles Eugene, Duke of Württemberg (1728–1793), son of Duke Karl I Alexander
- Friedrich Schiller (1759–1805), poet, philosopher, historian, and playwright
- Christian Ferdinand Friedrich Hochstetter (1787–1860), botanist and Protestant minister
- Friedrich Ruthardt (1802–1862), oboist and composer
- Charlotte Wahl (1817–1899), philanthropist
- Gottlieb Daimler (1834–1900), engineer, industrial designer and industrialist
- Dionys Pruckner (1834–1896), pianist and music teacher
- Wilhelm Maybach (1846–1929), designer and industrialist
- Anton Schott (1846–1913), German dramatic tenor
- Robert Bosch (1861–1942), industrialist, engineer and inventor
- Carl Eytel (1862–1925), German-American artist who studied at the Royal Art School and emigrated to Palm Springs, California
- Ferdinand Porsche (1875–1951), automotive engineer
- Paul Bonatz (1877–1956), architect
- Wilhelm Steinkopf (1879–1949), chemist
- Theodor Heuss (1884–1963), politician
- Claus von Stauffenberg (1907–1944), army officer and Catholic aristocrat
- Georg Pfäfflin (1908–1972), German Lutheran pastor of the Evangelical Church in Württemberg
- Günter Behnisch (1922–2010), architect
- Albrecht Roser (1922–2011), master puppeteer
- Frei Otto (1925–2015), architect and structural engineer
- Marlene Schmidt (born 1937), Miss Universe 1961
- Klaus von Klitzing (born 1943), physicist
- Fred Breinersdorfer (born 1946), screenwriter, producer and film director
- Norbert Haug (born 1952), journalist
- Jürgen Klinsmann (born 1964), footballer and coach
- Frank Karlitschek (born 1973), open source software developer
- Dragan Espenschied (born 1975), 8-bit musician and media artist
- Katja Mragowska (born 1975), artist
- Sascha Gerstner (born 1977), musician and photographer
- Louk Sorensen (born 1985), Irish tennis player
- Alexander Tuschinski (born 1988), film director
- Pia Wurtzbach (born 1989), Miss Universe 2015
- Fernando Raposo (born 1989), French basketball player
- Yoon So-hee (born 1993), South Korean actress
