= Vibratory sensation =

Vibratory sensation is the sense of vibration, and may refer to:

- Vibration as a modality of cutaneous receptors (on the skin), referred to as pallesthesia.
- Hearing, which is sensation of air vibrations
