= William Herndon =

William Herndon may refer to:

- William Lewis Herndon (1813–1857), officer and explorer in the United States Navy
- William Herndon (lawyer) (1818–1891), law partner and biographer of Abraham Lincoln
- William S. Herndon (1835–1903), U.S. Representative from Texas
