= Woehr =

Woehr is a surname. Notable people with the surname include:

- Andy Woehr (1896–1990), American baseball player
- Marc C. Woehr (born 1973), German contemporary artist
