= Confederate States Department of the Treasury =

The Confederate States Department of the Treasury was the department of the executive branch of the Confederate States of America responsible for the administration of the economic affairs of the Confederacy. These affairs including the issuing of debt, the collecting of taxes, the printing of money, and the administration of customs. The Department of the Treasury was led by the Secretary of the Treasury, a position which was established in legislation passed by the Provisional Confederate Congress in 1861.

== History ==
While not explicitly established in the Confederate Constitution, a mandate for the establishment of the Treasury Department can be inferred from repeated references throughout the document referring to the "Treasury of Confederate States". The Department of the Treasury was officially established by an act of the Confederate Provisional Congress.

One of the early acts of the Provisional Confederate Congress assembled in Montgomery pertained to the status of the federally employed customs official at customs houses which were in Confederate territory following the secession of states in which said customs houses were located. This issue was resolved by passing a bill assuming these customs agents into the employ of the Confederacy as part of the Department of the Treasury. The bill was passed into law on February 14, 1861 effecting such transfer of employment.

On March 9, 1861 the Provisional Congress authorized the printing of Confederate currency, in the form of paper treasury notes, amounting up to a total of $1 million (CSA).

== Organization ==
The Department of the Treasury had several sub-departments which were responsible for specific administrative duties within the department's purview.

- Loan Production Office

=== Office of the First Auditor ===
In 1864, the Confederate First Auditor was B. Baker of Florida.

=== Office of the Second Auditor ===
This office established in 1861, was responsible for auditing the accounts of the War Department. In 1864 the Second Auditor was W. M. S. Taylor of Louisiana.

=== Office of the Third Auditor ===
This office was established in 1864 to handle the accounts of the Confederate States Post Office.

- Office of the Treasury Agent of the Trans-Mississippi
- Treasury Note Bureau

=== Office of the Treasurer ===
From 1861 until 1864, Edward C. Elmore was the Treasurer of the Confederate States. He was succeeded by George Trenholm who served from July 1864 until the surrender of the Confederacy in April 1865.

=== Office of the Commissioner of Taxes ===
Established in August 1861 as the War Tax Office for the purpose collecting the taxes mandated by the Confederate Congress.

=== Lighthouse Bureau ===
Established on March 6, 1861 by an act of the Confederate Provisional Congress and placed into the care of the Department of the Treasury.

== See also ==
- Confederate States Department of the Treasury personnel
