= Megyeri =

Megyeri is a Hungarian surname. Notable people with the surname include:

- Balázs Megyeri (born 1990), Hungarian footballer
- Boglárka Megyeri (born 1987), Hungarian footballer
- Márta Megyeri (born 1952), Hungarian handball player
- Matthias Megyeri (born 1973), German artist

== See also ==
- Megyeri Bridge, a bridge in Budapest, Hungary
