= George W. Whitmore =

American politician (1824–1876)

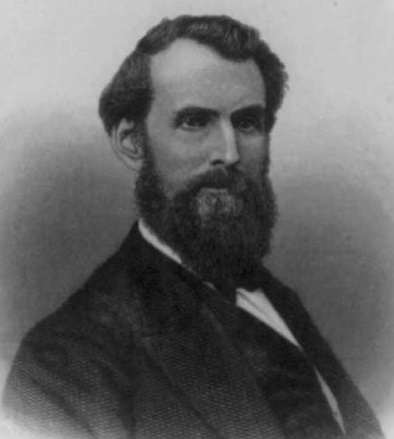

Member of the U.S. House of Representatives from Texas's 1st district
- In office March 30, 1870 – March 3, 1871
- Preceded by: John Henninger Reagan
- Succeeded by: William S. Herndon

Personal details
- Born: August 26, 1824 McMinn County, Tennessee
- Died: October 14, 1876 (aged 52) Tyler, Texas
- Party: Republican

George Washington Whitmore (August 26, 1824 – October 14, 1876) was a U.S. representative from Texas.

Born in McMinn County, Tennessee, Whitmore attended public schools. He moved to Texas in 1848. He studied law. After he was admitted to the bar, he practiced in Tyler, Texas. He served as member of the State house of representatives in 1852, 1853, and 1858. He served as district attorney for the ninth judicial district in 1866. He was appointed register in bankruptcy in 1867.

Upon the readmission of Texas, he was elected as a Republican to the Forty-first Congress and served from March 30, 1870, to March 3, 1871. He was an unsuccessful candidate for reelection in 1870 to the Forty-second Congress. He resumed the practice of law. He died in Tyler, Texas, October 14, 1876. He was interred in Oakwood Cemetery.

== Sources ==
- United States Congress. "George W. Whitmore (id: W000424)". Biographical Directory of the United States Congress.

U.S. House of Representatives
| Preceded by John Henninger Reagan | Member of the U.S. House of Representatives from Texas's 1st congressional district March 30, 1870 – March 3, 1871 | Succeeded by William S. Herndon |
