= Pallesthesia =

Ability to perceive vibration

Pallesthesia (/ˌpæləsˈθiːʒəˌ -iə/ PAL-əs-THEE-zhə, -ZHEE-ə), or vibratory sensation, is the ability to perceive vibration. This sensation, often conducted through skin and bone, is usually generated by mechanoreceptors such as Pacinian corpuscles, Merkel disk receptors, and tactile corpuscles. All of these receptors stimulate an action potential in afferent nerves (sensory neurons) found in various layers of the skin and body. The afferent neuron travels to the spinal column and then to the brain where the information is processed. Damage to the peripheral nervous system or central nervous system can result in a decline or loss of pallesthesia.

A diminished sense of vibration is known as pallhypesthesia. To determine whether a patient has diminished or absent pallesthesia, testing can be conducted using a tuning fork at 128 Hz by placing it on the skin overlying a bone. This works because bones are good resonators of vibrations.

== Receptors ==
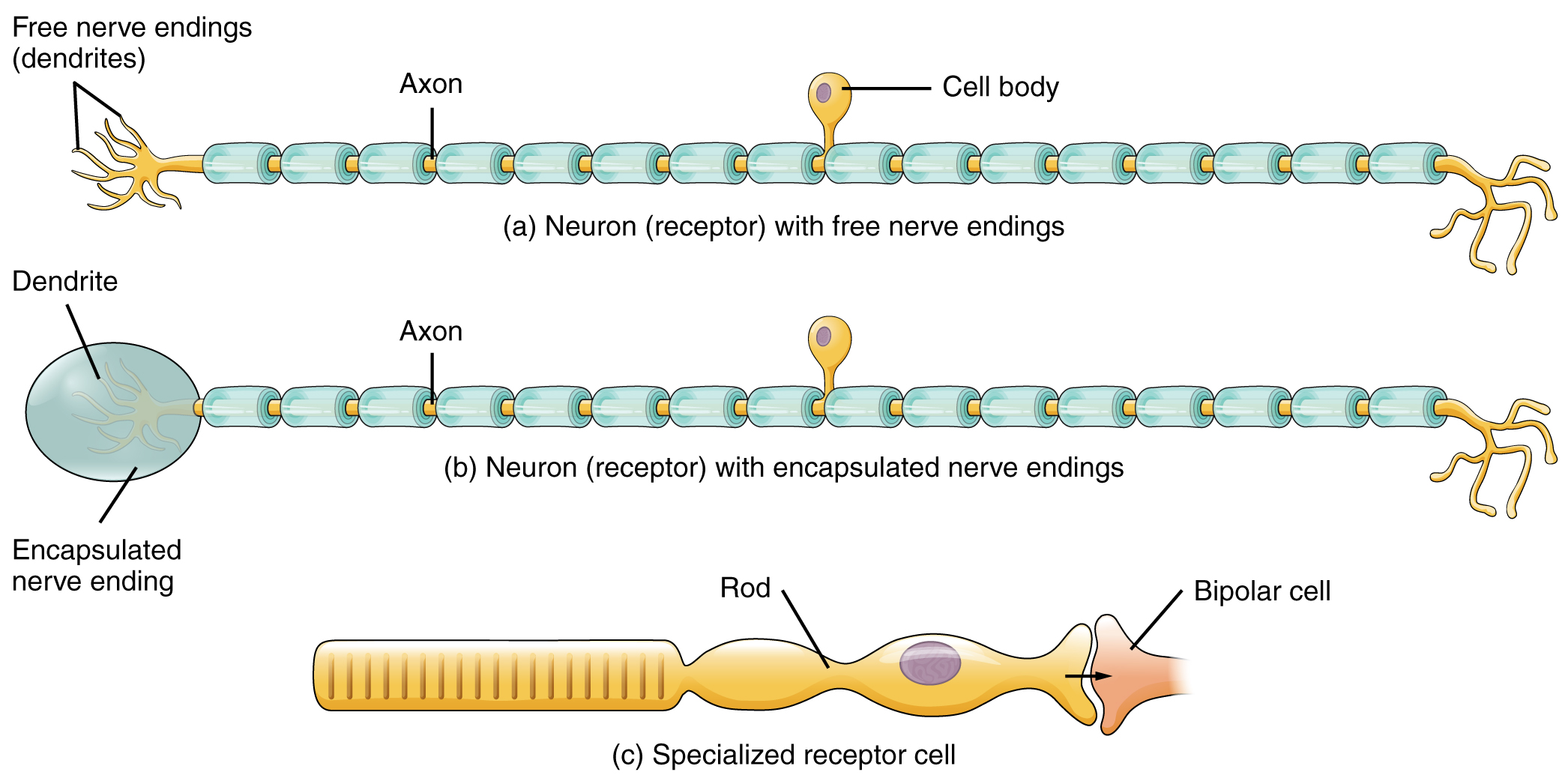
The second neuron in the figure depicts an encapsulated nerve ending.

Pacinian corpuscles, Merkel disk receptors, and tactile corpuscles are all encapsulated nerve endings involved in tactile stimulation. The Pacinian corpuscles are located within the deeper layer of the skin, under the skin in the subcutaneous tissues, within muscles, in the periosteum, and other deeper layers of the body. The Merkel disk receptors are located in the superficial epidermis and in hair follicles, while tactile corpuscles are concentrated heavily in the fingertips. Merkel disk receptors and tactile corpuscles respond best to low frequencies when producing an action potential.

== Pathway ==
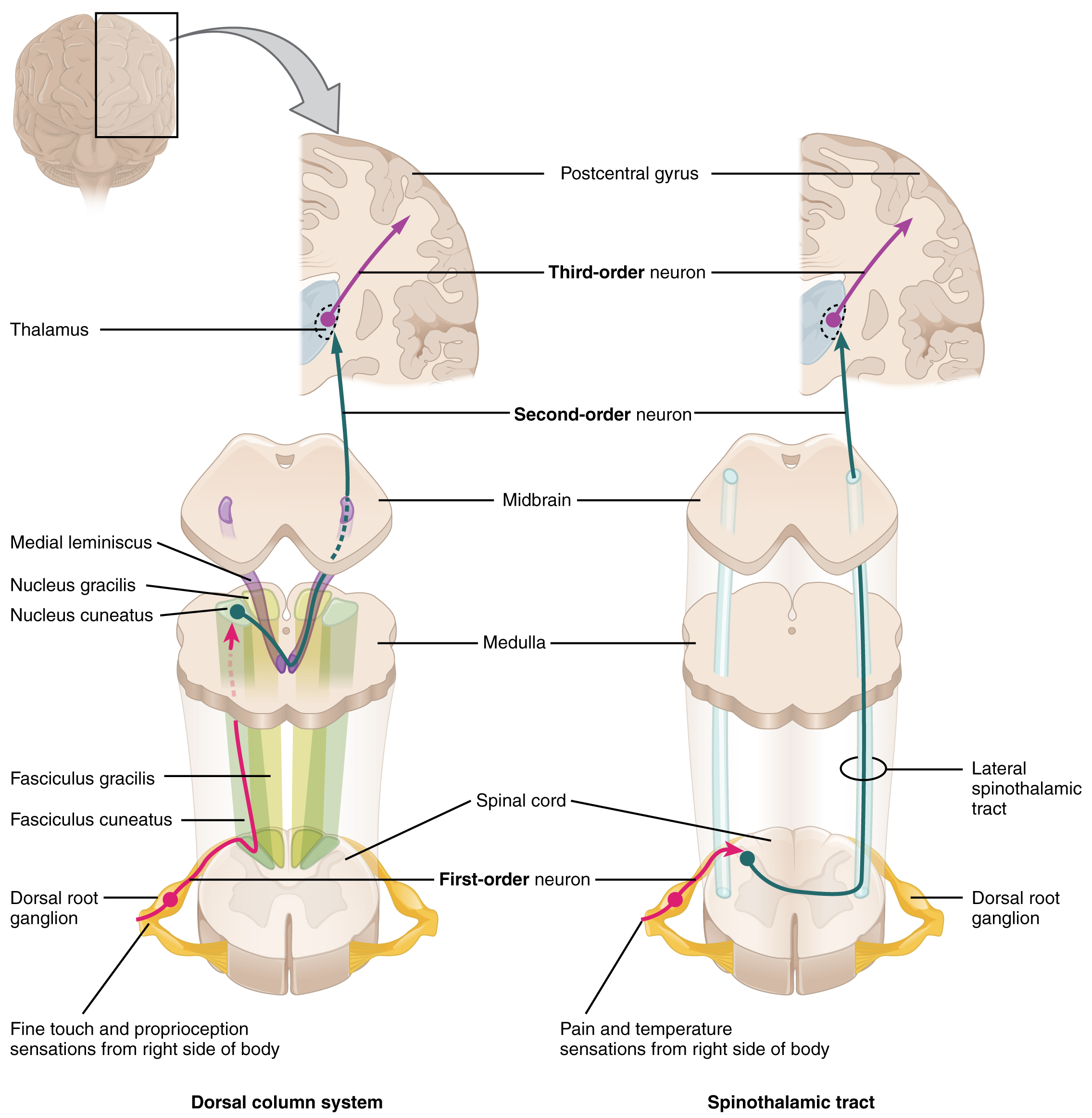
The image on the left side depicts the dorsal column pathway for vibration perception.

The sensory conduction pathway that allows for cognitive recognition of vibration occurs through afferent neurons, also known as sensory neurons. The outside stimulus is a vibration that activates one of the three encapsulated nerve endings based upon where the sensation is felt. The intensity of the vibration must cause the neuron(s) to reach or surpass a threshold in order for an action potential to be propagated. From here, the signal travels through the dorsal column–medial lemniscus pathway.

The pathway is composed of the dorsal column within the spinal cord and the medial lemniscus in the brain stem. Collectively, the ascending sensory fibers are called the dorsal column because ascending fibers gather at the dorsal funiculus in the spinal cord. The dorsal funiculus is located between the dorsal horn and the medial line in the spinal cord.

There are three types of neurons in the pathway: first-, second-, and third-order neurons. The first-order neuron is the afferent neuron. It enters the spinal cord through the dorsal root ganglia and branches in the spinal cord. Some neurons terminate in the spinal cord, where they contribute to a reflex response. Other neurons continue ipsilaterally, same side, to the medulla oblongata. If the neurons are coming from the lower limbs, they are carried by the fasciculus gracilis into the medulla. If the neurons are coming from the upper limbs; they are carried by the fasciculus cuneatus. In the medulla, at the dorsal column, nuclei of the first-order neuron synapse with the second-order neuron, which then decussates (crosses over to the other side of the central nervous system) into the medial lemniscus. The second-order neuron then carries the information to the ventral posterolateral nucleus of the thalamus and then the somatosensory cortex in the parietal lobe. Immediately, the posterior parietal lobe synthesizes the information into a recognizable pattern. The coded information is then sent to the prefrontal cortex to devise a motor response to the stimulation. The motor information is sent through efferent neurons.

== Testing ==
Routine clinical tests include quantitative vibratory testing and the Rydel-Seiffer tuning fork test. The typical frequency used for the tuning fork is 128 Hz. Some common areas for testing in the bones are the metatarsals, the tibia, the malleoli, the anterior superior iliac crest, vertebrae in the spinal cord, sternum, clavicle, and the styloid processes of the radius and ulna. These are particularly good for testing because they are close to the surface of the skin, with only a small amount of muscle over them. To test the perception through the skin, small pads are placed on the fingertips and a pallometer is used. For a bone, the test is conducted by placing a tuning fork on a bony prominence and striking the fork. The amount of force used to strike the fork determines the intensity and duration of the vibration delivered. The lower limbs have a higher threshold than the upper limbs, so a stronger stimulus is needed.

For accuracy, homologous sites on both the left and right side of the body need to be tested. The person may lose some perception of pallesthesia when switching sides, probably due to sensory adaptation, as the receptors require a larger threshold to produce an action potential because of previous stimulation. If a person reports asymmetrical perception this may indicate an underlining neurological issue, as can a lack of perception when the tuning fork is applied to a normal area after being applied to the abnormal area on the opposite side. Vibration testing is often used to distinguish different neurological disorders and to understand neurological pathways and functions. It is often conducted in older people because advancing age leads to a decline in vibratory sensation. Older people may have complete loss of vibratory sensation in their toes; to determine if the cause is age or a neurological disorder, it can be useful to compare with another person of the same age.

== Disorders ==
A benefit of pallesthesia testing is that it can be used to identify disorders within the neural pathways. Because there are few areas in the neural pathway where the sensation and perception of vibration can be disturbed, this testing enables doctors to more accurately diagnose their patients' health. It can help to identify effects of other diseases on the nervous system, such as diabetes mellitus.

=== Neural disorders ===
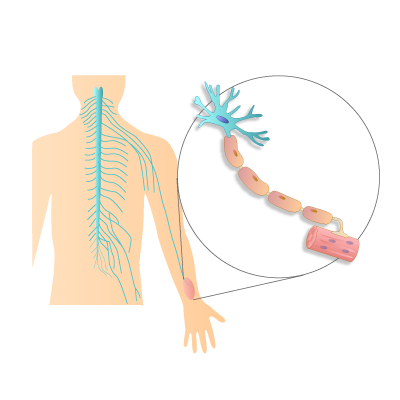
The peripheral nervous system with an enlarged depiction of an afferent neuron.

==== Peripheral nervous system ====
The peripheral nervous system is composed of afferent and efferent neurons; disorder of these neurons is called peripheral neuropathy. Vibration examination can detect and localize disorders of the peripheral nervous system. A gradual loss of sensation from the toes to the knees is consistent with a peripheral nerve problem, whereas an impairment in perceiving vibration from all extremities is a sign of a posterior column disorder. Impairments classified to the peripheral nervous system and posterior column are indicators of demyelination of afferent neurons from a variety of causes.

===== Myelopathy =====
Myelopathy is a disorder within the spinal cord. Compression on the spinal cord by bony projections or a displaced disk in the cervical spine are the most common causes of myelopathy. Inflammation, illness, and neurodegenerative, nutritional, and vascular disorders can also contribute to myelopathy. Quantitative vibratory testing can be used to assess a patient with myelopathy when the examiner detects uniform loss of vibration below a certain spinal level. For example, if the examination is normal from the iliac crest to the knees but pallesthesia is absent from the knees to the toes, this would be consistent with myelopathy.

==== Central nervous system ====
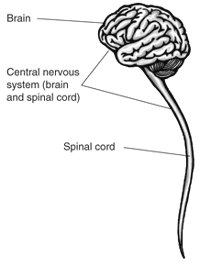
The central nervous system

The central nervous system is composed of the spinal cord and the brain. Many neurological studies are conducted on patients with lesions. Scientists can learn about the functions of different brain areas by looking at damage to those areas. Thus, studies have been conducted on lesion patients for pallesthesia. A common disease to the central nervous system is multiple sclerosis. In this disease, the immune system attacks the myelin sheath surrounding neurons. Deterioration of the myelin sheath drastically reduces the conduction speed of neurons, thus affecting sensation and motor control of the body. These patients exhibit the largest reduction in pallesthesia. They cannot perceive vibration at 128 Hz; however, studies have shown that 256 Hz can be perceived in young multiple sclerosis patients.

=== Diabetic neuropathy ===
Diabetes mellitus is a disorder in which the body cannot break down glucose either because insulin is not produced or the body does not produce enough insulin. This causes glucose to accumulate in the blood. High concentrations of glucose in the blood can injure nerve fibers, resulting in diabetic neuropathy. In most cases, the nerve damage occurs in afferent neurons in the foot and lower limbs. Nerve damage can be assessed with pallesthesia. If there is an inability to sense the vibration being applied from the tuning fork, then nerve damage has occurred. A doctor then assesses the damage and places the patient on treatment, which in severe cases may include amputation of a foot or limb.

== Research ==
From the early 1950s through the 1970s, pallesthesia was used as a research method for many disorders of the sensory system. Scientists hoped to find a new therapy to reconstruct neuronal outputs. They understood that damage to the central nervous system could not be repaired; however, they hoped to rewire the peripheral nervous system to give patients some of their sensation back. One study looked into the effects of pallesthesia on stroke patients. They theorized that sinusoidal stimulation may be an effective therapy; however, the results were inconclusive. It is rare for current research to use pallesthesia because better methods of testing the sensory system have been developed.

== See also ==
- Friedrich Wilhelm Seiffer
