= Christopher Memminger =

American politician

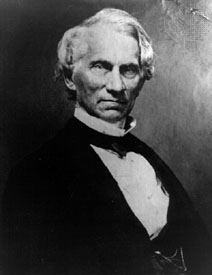

1st Confederate States Secretary of the Treasury
- In office February 25, 1861 – July 18, 1864
- President: Jefferson Davis
- Preceded by: Position Established
- Succeeded by: G. A. Trenholm

Deputy from South Carolina to the Provisional Congress of the Confederate States
- In office February 4, 1861 – February 17, 1862
- Preceded by: New constituency
- Succeeded by: Constituency abolished

Personal details
- Born: Christoph Gustav Memminger; January 9, 1803 Vaihingen an der Enz, Wuerttemberg (present-day Vaihingen an der Enz, Germany)
- Died: March 7, 1888 (aged 85) Charleston, South Carolina
- Resting place: St. John in the Wilderness, Flat Rock, North Carolina; 35°16′56.8″N 82°26′34.2″W
- Party: Democratic
- Education: South Carolina College
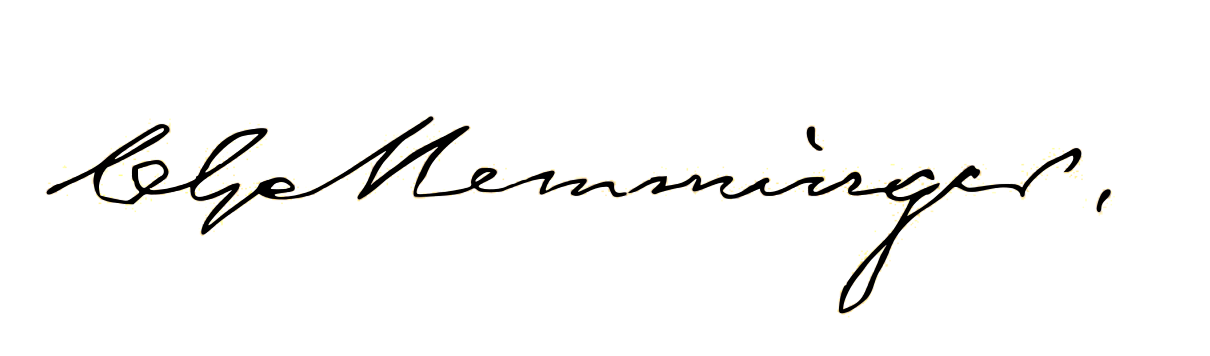
- Signature

Christopher Gustavus Memminger (German: Christoph Gustav Memminger; January 9, 1803 – March 7, 1888) was an American politician and a secessionist who participated in the formation of the Confederate States government. He was the principal author of the Provisional Constitution (1861), as well as the founder of the Confederate financial system. As the first Confederate States Secretary of the Treasury, Memminger was the principal author of the economic policies of Jefferson Davis's administration.

== Early life and career ==
Christopher Gustavus Memminger was born on January 9, 1803, in Vaihingen an der Enz, Wuerttemberg, Germany). His father, Gottfried Memminger, was a military officer who died a month after his son's birth. His mother, Eberhardina (née Kohler) Memminger, immigrated to Charleston, South Carolina, but died of yellow fever in 1807. Christo,her was placed in an orphanage. His fortunes changed when, at the age of eleven, he was taken under the care of Thomas Bennett, a prominent lawyer and future Governor. He entered South Carolina College at the age of 12 and graduated second in his class at 16. Memminger passed the bar in 1825 and became a successful lawyer. He married Mary Withers Wilkinson in 1832.

He was a leader of the opponents during the Nullification Crisis. He published The Book of Nullification (1832–33), which satirized the advocates of the doctrine in biblical style. He entered state politics and served in the South Carolina state legislature from 1836 to 1852 and 1854 to 1860, where for nearly twenty years he was the head of the finance committee. Memminger was a staunch advocate of education and helped give Charleston one of the most comprehensive public school systems in the country. In 1859, after John Brown's raid, he was commissioned by South Carolina to consult with other delegates in Virginia as to the best method of warding off attacks of abolitionists.

== Civil War ==
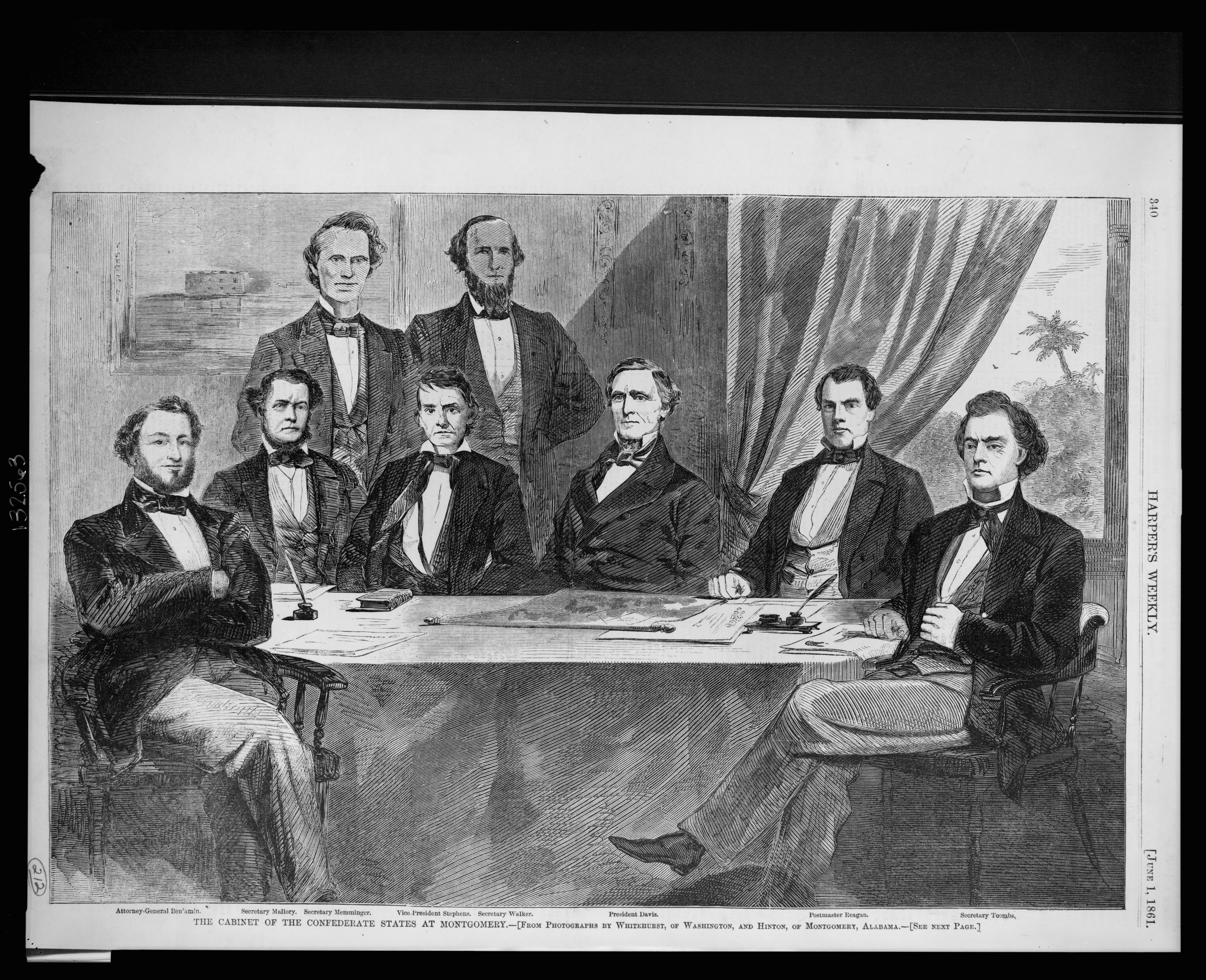
The original Confederate Cabinet. L-R: Judah P. Benjamin, Stephen Mallory, Christopher Memminger, Alexander Stephens, LeRoy Pope Walker, Jefferson Davis, John H. Reagan and Robert Toombs.

Memminger was considered a moderate on the secession issue, but after the election of Abraham Lincoln, he decided that secession was necessary. Memminger owned 12 slaves (six males), listed in his estate in the Charleston, South Carolina, census of 1850. His estate was in Henderson County, North Carolina, where he built his Connemara summer home). When South Carolina seceded from the United States in 1860, Memminger was asked to write the South Carolina Declaration of Secession (officially: Declaration of the Immediate Causes Which Induce and Justify the Secession of South Carolina from the Federal Union), which outlined the reasons for secession. When other states declared secession, he was selected as a South Carolina delegate to the Provisional Congress of the Confederate States. He was the chair of the committee which drafted the Provisional Constitution of the Confederate States. The twelve-man committee produced a provisional constitution in only four days.

When Jefferson Davis formed his first cabinet, Memminger was appointed Secretary of the Treasury on February 21, 1861. It was a difficult task in view of the Confederacy's financial challenges. He attempted to finance the government initially by bonds and tariffs (and the confiscation of gold from the United States Mint in New Orleans). Still, he soon found himself forced to more extreme measures such as income taxes and fiat currency. He had been a supporter of hard currency before the war but found himself issuing increasingly-devalued paper money, which had become worth less than 2% of its face value in gold by the end of the war.

== Later life ==
Memminger resigned as Secretary of the Treasury on July 1, 1864, and was replaced by fellow South Carolinian George Trenholm. He returned to his summer residence in Flat Rock, North Carolina. In the post-war years, he returned to Charleston, received a presidential pardon in 1866, and returned to private law practice and business investment. He also continued his work on developing South Carolina's public education system and was voted to a final term in the state legislature in 1877. Memminger died on March 7, 1888, at age 85, in Charleston, South Carolina.

== Notable works ==
- The Book of Nullification (1830)

== Honors ==
Christopher Memminger was featured on the Confederate $5.00 bill.

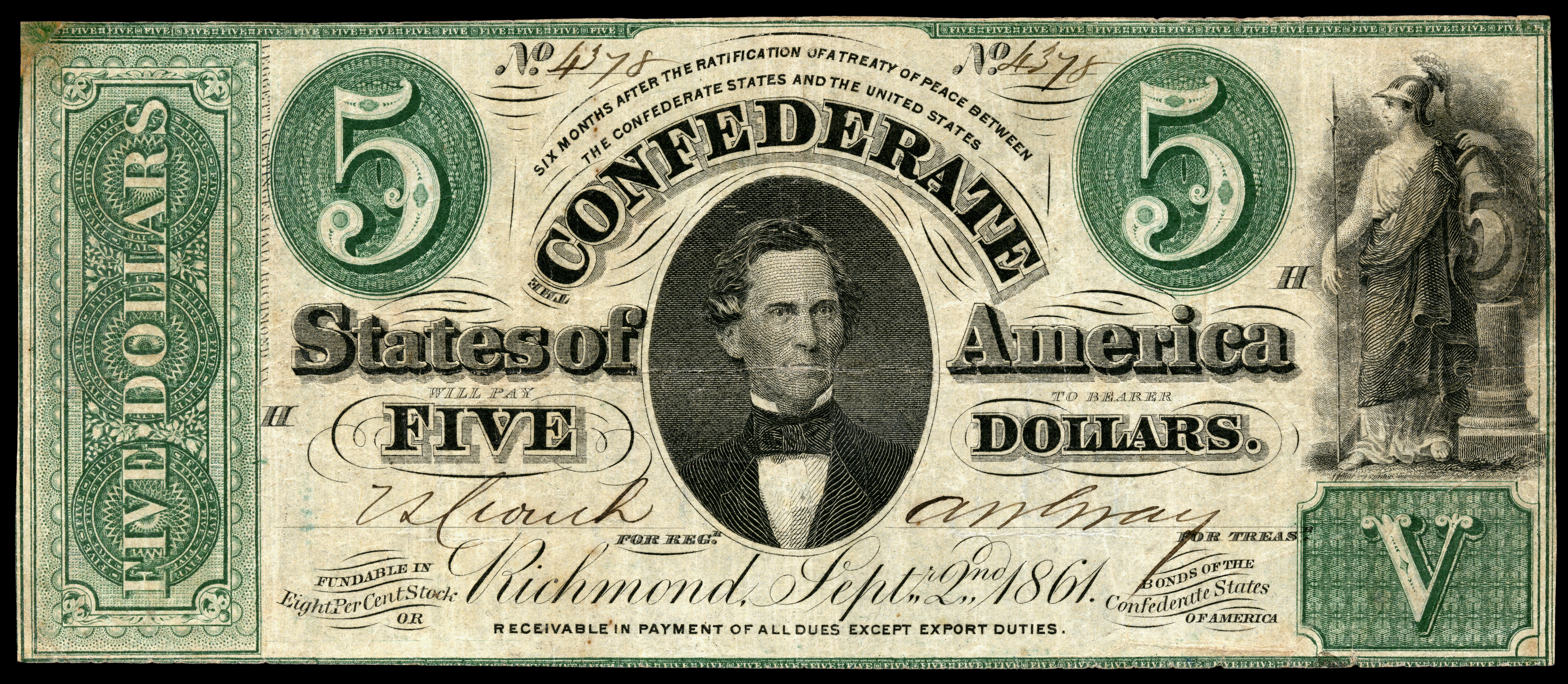
Memminger on the 1862 CS$5 banknote

== See also ==
- List of German Americans
- List of orphans and foundlings
- List of people from Stuttgart

== Notes ==
Political offices
New constituency	Deputy from South Carolina to the Provisional Congress of the Confederate States; 1861–1862; With: R. B. Rhett, Sr. R. W. Barnwell; L. M. Keitt; James Chesnut, Jr. W. Porcher Miles; Thomas J. Withers; W. W. Boyce	Constituency abolished
New office	Confederate States Secretary of the Treasury; 1861–1864	Succeeded by G. A. Trenholm
