= John H. Reagan =

American politician (1818–1905)

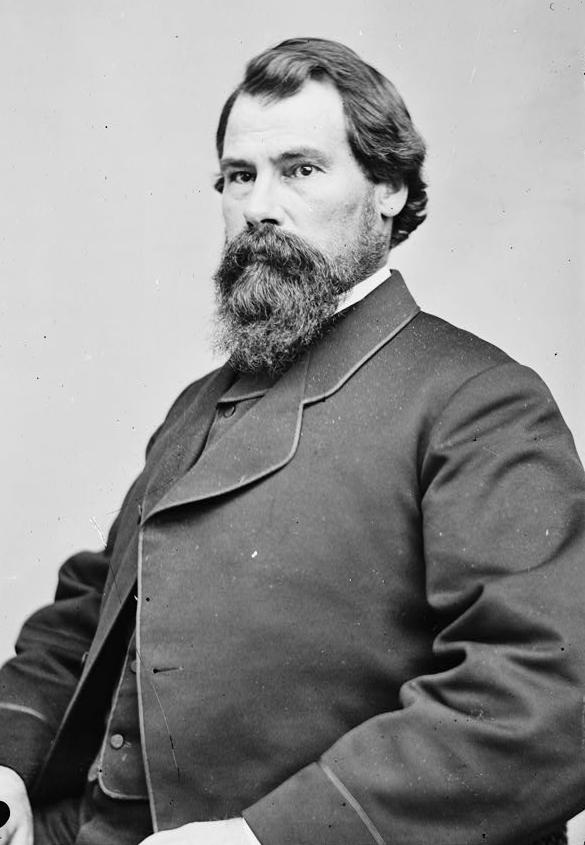

United States Senator from Texas
- In office March 4, 1887 – June 10, 1891
- Preceded by: Samuel Maxey
- Succeeded by: Horace Chilton

Railroad Commissioner of Texas
- In office June 10, 1891 – January 20, 1903
- Governor: Jim Hogg; Charles A. Culberson; Joseph D. Sayers
- Preceded by: Office established
- Succeeded by: Oscar Branch Colquitt

Confederate States Secretary of the Treasury
- Acting; April 27, 1865 – May 10, 1865
- President: Jefferson Davis
- Preceded by: George Trenholm
- Succeeded by: Position abolished

Confederate States Postmaster General
- In office March 6, 1861 – May 10, 1865
- President: Jefferson Davis
- Preceded by: Position established
- Succeeded by: Position abolished

Member of the U.S. House of Representatives from Texas
- In office March 4, 1875 – March 3, 1887
- Preceded by: William Herndon
- Succeeded by: William Martin
- Constituency: 1st district (1875–83); 2nd district (1883–87)
- In office March 4, 1857 – March 3, 1861
- Preceded by: Lemuel Evans
- Succeeded by: George Whitmore
- Constituency: 1st district

Member of the Texas House of Representatives from the Nacogdoches district
- In office December 13, 1847 – November 5, 1849

Personal details
- Born: October 8, 1818 Gatlinburg, Tennessee, U.S.
- Died: March 6, 1905 (aged 86) Palestine, Texas, U.S.
- Resting place: Palestine City Cemetery; Palestine, Texas
- Party: Democratic
- Spouse(s): Martha Music (m. 1844; died 1845) Edwina Moss Nelms (m. 1852; died 1863) Molly Ford Taylor (m. 1866)

John Henninger Reagan (October 8, 1818 – March 6, 1905) was an American and Confederate politician from Texas. A Democrat, Reagan resigned from the U.S. House of Representatives when Texas seceded from the United States and joined the Confederate States of America. He served in the Confederate cabinet of Jefferson Davis as Postmaster General.

After the Confederate defeat in the Civil War and his release from prison after the war, Reagan called for cooperation by the Southern states with the U.S. government, an unpopular position among most Democrats. He was elected to Congress in 1874 and was elected in 1886 by the state legislature as a Democrat from Texas to the U.S. Senate, where he served one term from 1887 to 1891. He resigned from the seat when appointed by the governor as chairman of the Texas Railroad Commission. He was among the founders of the Texas State Historical Association.

Reagan was elected to the U.S. Senate as the representative of the Democratic Party for the state of Texas. He was the only former Confederate cabinet member to be seated in the U.S. Senate after the Civil War, and one of just three former Confederate cabinet members to take major political offices after the war. Alexander H. Stephens, the only Confederate vice president, was also elected in 1866 to represent Georgia, but was not permitted to be seated in the Senate due to his war history. Reagan sat in the Senate for just one term.

== Early life ==
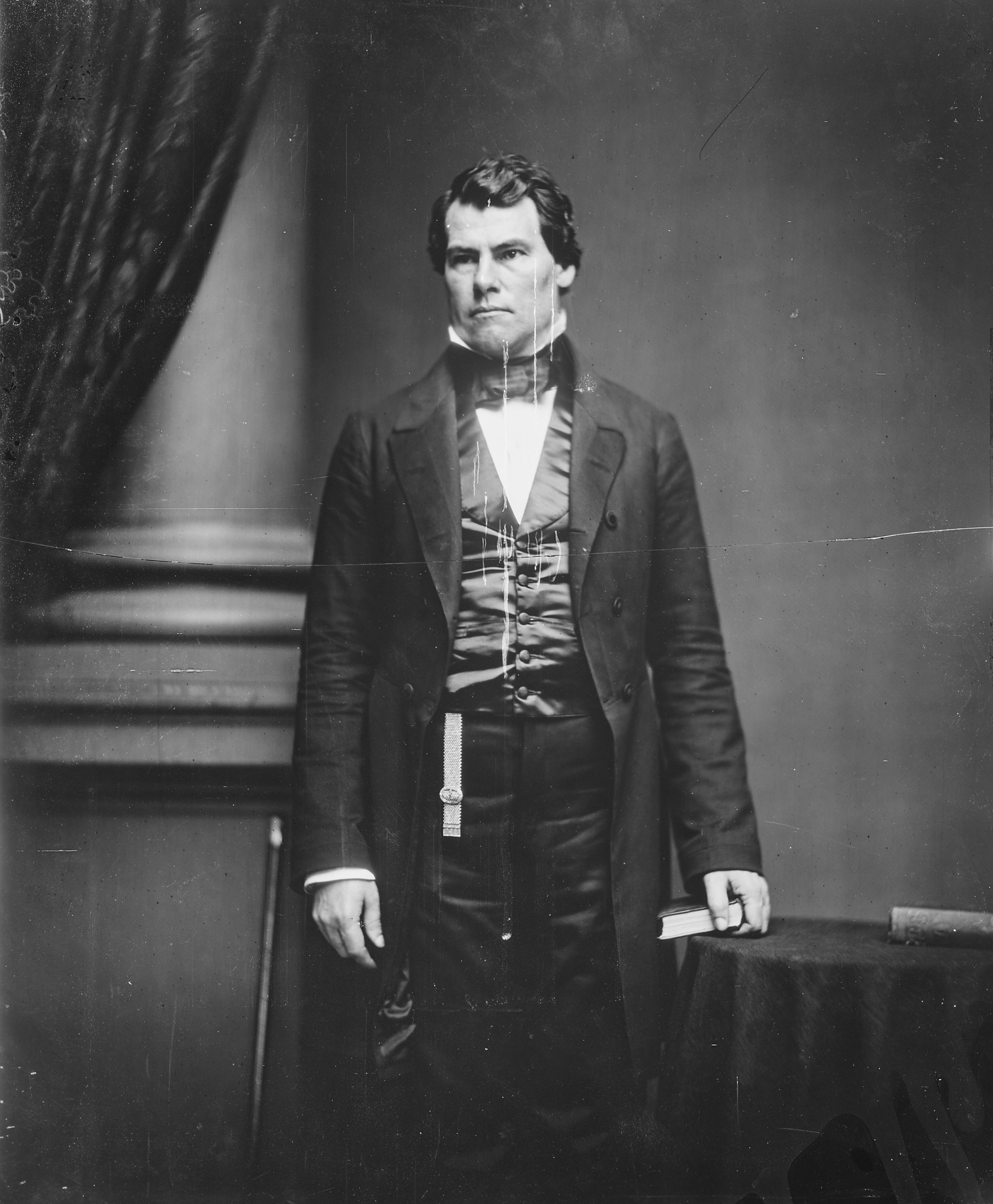
Reagan as a freshman congressman

John Henninger Reagan was born in 1818 in Gatlinburg, Tennessee, to Timothy Richard and Elizabeth (Lusk) Reagan. His parents were primarily of English and Lowland Scottish descent.

He left Tennessee at age nineteen and traveled to the Republic of Texas, which had become independent from Mexico the year before in 1836. Reagan worked as a surveyor from 1839 to 1843. He bought a property and farmed in Kaufman County until 1851. During the time he worked as a surveyor, he also served as a private tutor to the children of John Marie Durst.

Reagan read the law, served as an apprentice in an established firm, and was licensed to practice in 1846. He opened an office in Buffalo and the same year was elected a probate judge in Henderson County. In 1847 he was elected to the Texas House of Representatives but was defeated for a second term in 1849. He was admitted to the bar in 1848 and practiced in both Buffalo and Palestine, Texas.

Reagan was elected as a district judge in Palestine, serving from 1852 to 1857. As a judge, he oversaw Jane Elkins' case, convicting her of murder and making her the first woman to be legally executed in Texas. His efforts to defeat the American Party (Know-Nothings) resulted in his election to Congress as a Democrat in 1857 from Texas's 1st congressional district.

Reagan was a staunch supporter of slavery. He believed abolition would cause such social problems as to require Southern whites "exterminate the greater portion of the [black] race." He also believed in the federal protections of slavery under the U.S. Constitution as extensions of private property rights, therefore he supported the United States, but when it became clear that Texas would secede, Reagan resigned from Congress on January 15, 1861, and returned home to the state to participate in the rebellion.

He participated in the secession convention at Austin, Texas on January 31, 1861. Chosen as a member of the Provisional Confederate Congress, President Jefferson Davis appointed Reagan to his cabinet as Postmaster General within a month.

== Civil War ==
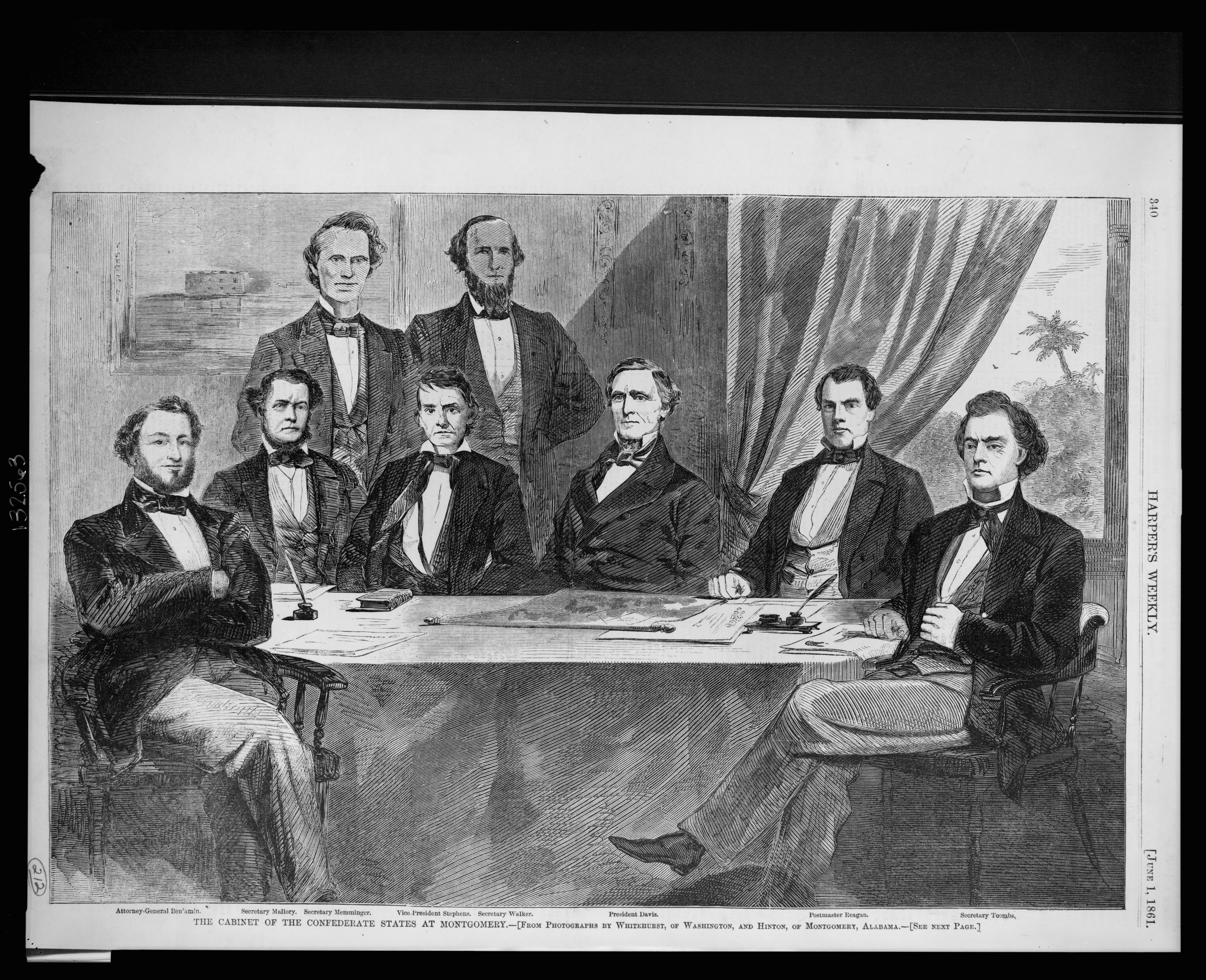
The original Confederate Cabinet. L-R: Judah P. Benjamin, Stephen Mallory, Christopher Memminger, Alexander Stephens, LeRoy Pope Walker, Jefferson Davis, John H. Reagan and Robert Toombs.

Despite the hostilities, the United States Post Office Department continued operations in the Confederacy until June 1, 1861, when the Confederate service took over its functions.

Reagan sent an agent to Washington, D.C., with letters asking the heads of the United States Post Office Department's various bureaus to work for him. Nearly all did so and brought copies of their records, contracts, account books, etc. "Reagan in effect had stolen the U.S. Post Office," historian William C. Davis later wrote.

Reagan cut expenses by eliminating costly and little-used routes and forcing railroads that carried the mail to reduce their rates. Despite the problems the war caused, his department managed to turn a profit, "the only post office department in American history to pay its own way," wrote William C. Davis. Reagan was the only member of the cabinet to oppose Robert E. Lee's offensive into Pennsylvania in June–July 1863. He instead supported a proposal to detach the First Corps of the Army of Northern Virginia to reinforce Joseph E. Johnston in Mississippi, to break the Siege of Vicksburg. Historian Shelby Foote noted that, as the only Cabinet member from west of the Mississippi, Reagan was acutely aware of the critical consequences of Vicksburg's capture and control of the river by U.S. forces.

When Davis abandoned Richmond, Virginia on April 2, 1865, shortly before the entry of Army of the Potomac under George G. Meade, Reagan accompanied the president on his flight to the Carolinas. On April 27, Davis made him Secretary of the Treasury after George A. Trenholm's resignation. Reagan served in that capacity until he, Davis, and Texas governor Francis R. Lubbock were captured near Irwinville, Georgia, on May 10.

Reagan was imprisoned with Confederate vice president Alexander Stephens at Fort Warren in Boston, Massachusetts. He was held in solitary confinement for twenty-two weeks. On August 11, he wrote an open letter to his fellow Texans urging cooperation with the United States, renunciation of the secession convention, the abolition of slavery, and letting formerly enslaved people vote. He warned that the U.S. government would be forced to impose military rule to enforce these measures if Texans did not voluntarily adopt them. Abolition was underway, and Reagan knew there was support for granting the vote to freedmen. Texans denounced him. After being released from prison later that year, he returned to his home in Palestine, Texas in December.

== Return to public life ==
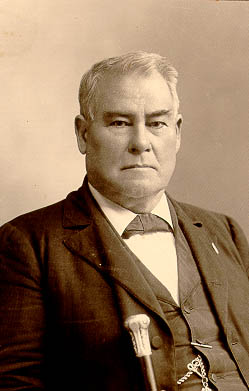
Reagan in his later years

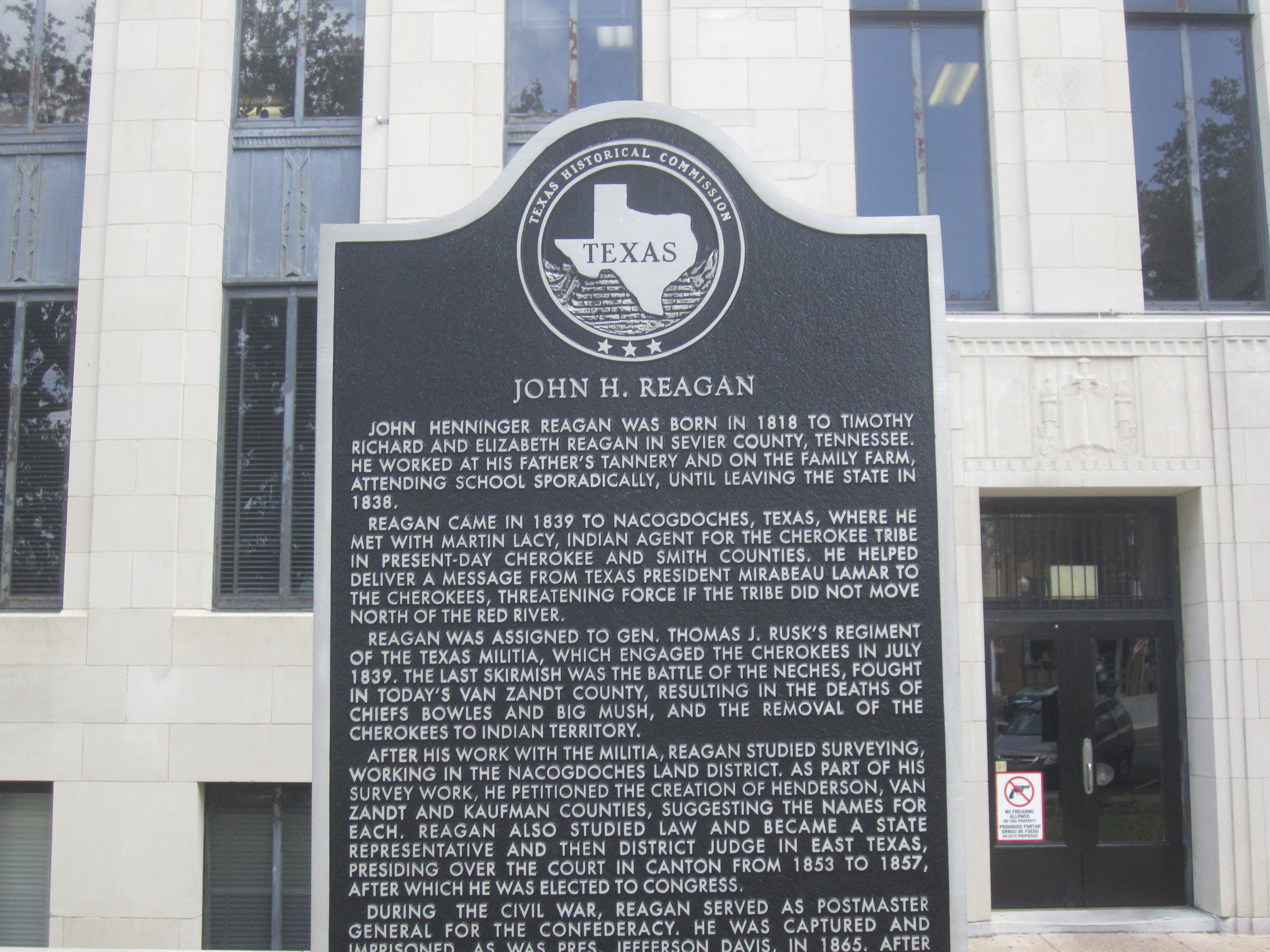
Reagan historical marker outside the Van Zandt County Courthouse in Canton, Texas

To those who felt that the Reconstruction was unduly harsh, Reagan's prescience was hailed—he became known as the "Old Roman," a Texas Cincinnatus. He was part of the successful effort to remove Republican Edmund J. Davis from the governorship in 1874 after Davis attempted to remain in office illegally after losing the election.

That year, Reagan was elected to the Congressional seat he held before the war, and he served from March 4, 1875 to March 3, 1887. In 1875, he was a delegate to the convention that wrote a new state constitution for Texas. In Congress, he advocated federal regulation of railroads and helped create the Interstate Commerce Commission. He also served as the first chairman of the Committee on Post Offices and Post Roads.

Elected by the Texas State Legislature to the U.S. Senate in 1887 (serving from March 4, 1887 to June 10, 1891), Reagan resigned to become chair of the Railroad Commission of Texas at the behest of his friend, Governor Jim Hogg. He chaired it until 1903, continuing to serve under governors Charles A. Culberson and Joseph D. Sayers. Hogg had run on a platform of state regulation of railroads.

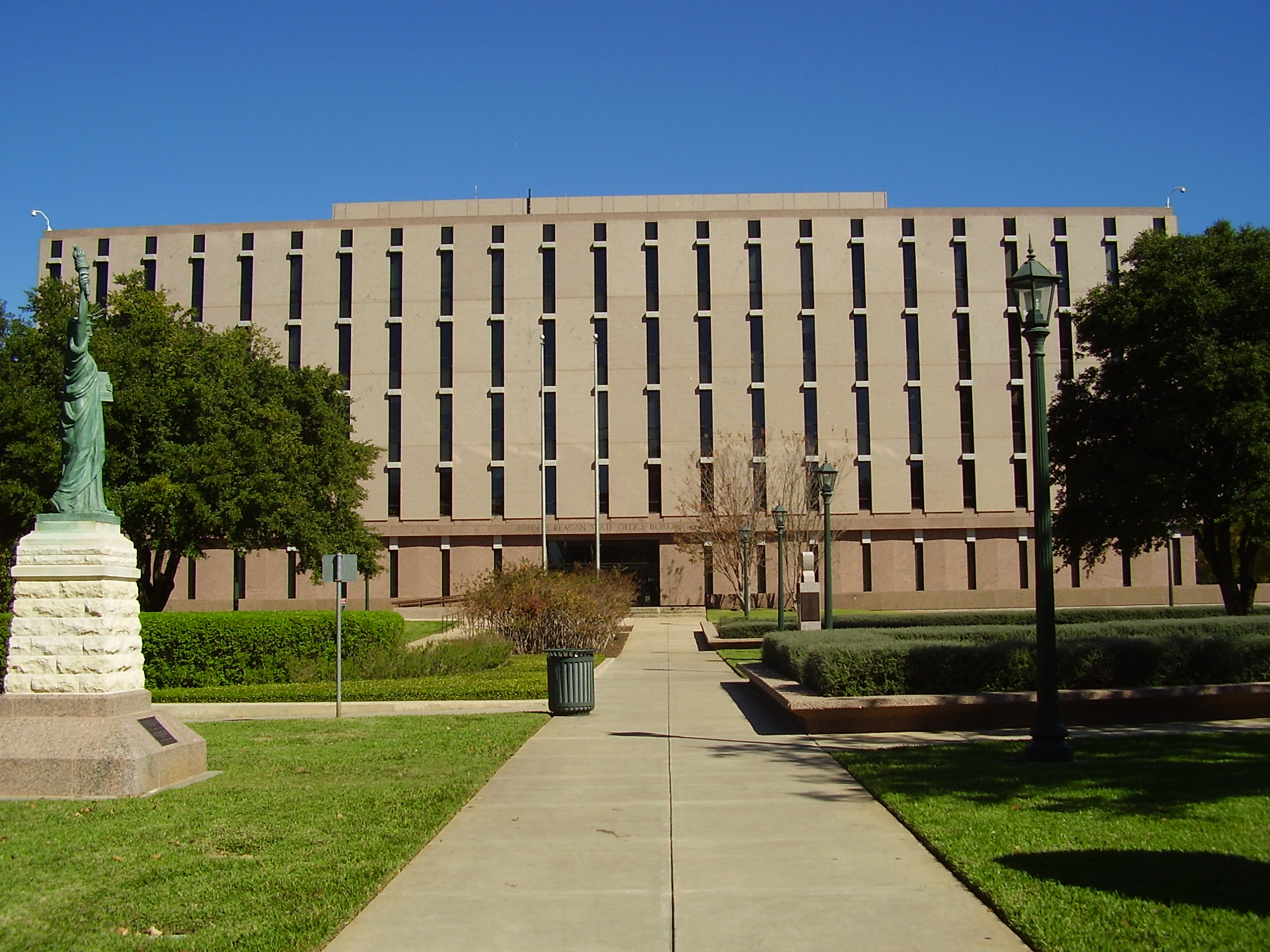
John H. Reagan State Office Building

Conscious of the importance of recounting and interpreting history, Reagan founded the Texas State Historical Association. He also attended reunions of Confederate veterans in his state. He wrote his Memoirs, With Special Reference to Secession and the Civil War, published in 1905. Later that year, Reagan died of pneumonia at his home in Palestine, the last surviving member of Jefferson Davis' cabinet in the Confederate government. Reagan was buried in East Hill Cemetery in Palestine, Texas.

== Legacy and honors ==
- Historian Ben H. Procter included Reagan in his list of the "four greatest Texans of the 19th century," along with Stephen F. Austin, Sam Houston, and James Stephen Hogg.
- Reagan County, Texas, was named in his honor.
- Several schools were named for him, including John H. Reagan Elementary School in Dallas and a Reagan High School in Houston and Austin. Reagan High School in Houston was renamed in 2016 to Heights High School by the Houston Independent School District. In 2019, Reagan Early College High School in Austin was renamed as Northeast Early College High School.
- The John H. Reagan State Office Building on the Texas State Capitol grounds was named in his honor.
- Reagan was commemorated by a statue on the University of Texas at Austin campus. On August 21, 2017, Reagan's statue in Austin was removed. Plans were announced to add it to the Dolph Briscoe Center for American History.
- A park in his hometown of Palestine, Texas, was named for him. A statue of Reagan was installed on the grounds.

== See also ==
- List of United States senators from Texas

U.S. House of Representatives
Preceded by Lemuel Evans	Member of the U.S. House of Representatives from Texas's 1st congressional district 1857–1861	Succeeded by George Whitmore^{(1)}
Preceded by William Herndon	Member of the U.S. House of Representatives from Texas's 1st congressional district 1875–1883	Succeeded by Charles Stewart
Preceded by David Culberson	Member of the U.S. House of Representatives from Texas's 2nd congressional district 1883–1887	Succeeded by William Martin
Political offices
New office	Confederate States Postmaster General; 1861–1865	Position abolished
Preceded by George Trenholm	Confederate States Secretary of the Treasury; Acting; 1865	Position abolished
U.S. Senate
Preceded by Samuel Maxey	United States Senator (Class 1) from Texas; 1887–1891; Served alongside: Richard Coke	Succeeded by Horace Chilton
Notes and references
1. Because of Texas's rebellion, the House seat was vacant for nine years before Whitmore succeeded Reagan.
