= Confederate States Department of the Treasury personnel =

During the American Civil War 11 Southern slave states declared their secession from the United States and formed the Confederate States of America, also known as "the Confederacy". Led by Jefferson Davis, the Confederacy fought for its independence from the United States. Below is a list of those who served in the Confederate States Department of the Treasury.

== Assistant Secretary of the Treasury ==
Name	State of Origin	Date Office Taken	Date Office Left	Notes
Philip Clayton	Georgia	February 1861	1863	
William Wood Crump	Virginia	1863	April 1865	

== Others ==
List dated May 22, 1864:

- Robert Tyler, Register
- E. C. Elmore, Treasurer
- J. M. Strother of Virginia, Chief Clerk
- Lewis Cruger of South Carolina, Comptroller
- B. Baker of Florida, First Auditor
- W. M. S. Taylor of Louisiana, Second Auditor
