= Johann Gottlieb Faber =

German theologian (1717–1779)

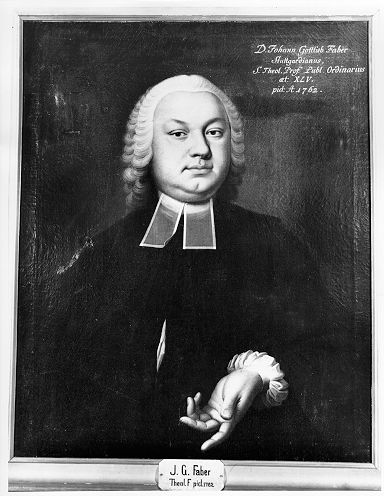
Portrait of Faber in the collection of the University of Tübingen

Johann Gottlieb Faber (1717–1779) was a Lutheran theologian of Germany.

== Life ==
Johann Gottlieb Faber was born at Stuttgart on 8 March 1717. He studied at Tübingen, and was appointed professor there in 1748. In 1767 he was made a member of the consistory and abbot of Alpirsbach. He died at Stuttgart on 18 March 1779.

== Works ==
- De Naturalismo Morali (Tübingen, 1752);
- De Anima Legum (Tübingen, 1752);
- De Principe Christiano (Tübingen, 1753);
- De Miraculis Christi (Tübingen, 1764);
- Meletema Philosophicum (Tübingen, 1765);
- De Diverssis Fontibus Tolerantiae (Tübingen, 1769);
- Theologia Dogmatica (Stuttgart, 1780).

== Sources ==
- Hartmann, Julius (1877). "Faber, Johann Gottlieb". In Allgemeine Deutsche Biographie (ADB). Vol. 6. Leipzig: Duncker & Humblot. pp. 496.

Attribution:

- Pick, B. (1887). "Faber, Johann Gottlieb". In McClintock, John; Strong, James (eds.). Cyclopædia of Biblical, Theological and Ecclesiastical Literature. Supplement.—Vol. 2. New York: Harper & Brothers. p. 369.
