= William S. Herndon =

American politician (1835–1903)

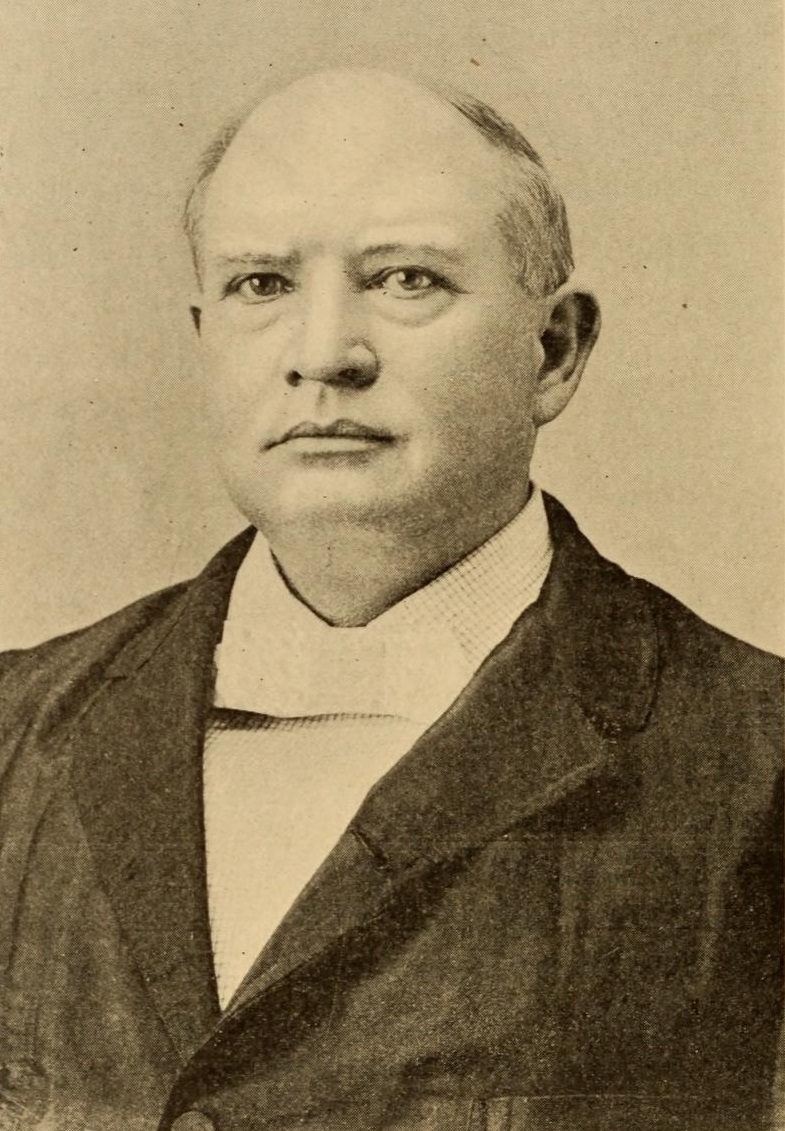

Member of the U.S. House of Representatives from Texas's 1st district
- In office March 4, 1871 – March 3, 1875
- Preceded by: George W. Whitmore
- Succeeded by: John Henninger Reagan

Personal details
- Born: November 27, 1835 Rome, Georgia
- Died: October 11, 1903 (aged 67) Albuquerque, New Mexico
- Resting place: Oakwood Cemetery, Tyler, Texas
- Party: Democratic
- Spouse: Mary Louise McKeller Herndon
- Education: McKenzie College

Military service
- Allegiance: United States; Confederate States
- Branch/service: Confederate States Army
- Rank: Captain
- Unit: 13th Texas Infantry
- Battles/wars: American Civil War

William Smith Herndon (November 27, 1835 – October 11, 1903) was a U.S. representative from Texas.

== Biography ==
Herndon was born in Rome, Georgia, and moved to Wood County, Texas, in May 1852. He attended the common schools and graduated from McKenzie College in 1859. He then studied law, attained admission to the bar in 1860 and commenced practice in Tyler, Texas.

He served as a member of the Confederate States Army during the American Civil War; he enlisted in 1861, and attained the rank of captain before being discharged in 1865.

After the war, Herndon resumed the practice of law in Tyler, and became counsel, executive advisor, and general solicitor for several railroads.

Herndon was elected as a Democrat to the Forty-second and Forty-third Congresses (March 4, 1871 – March 3, 1875). He was an unsuccessful candidate for reelection in 1874 to the Forty-fourth Congress.

Following his service in Congress, Herndon resumed practicing law in Tyler. He died in Albuquerque, New Mexico, October 11, 1903, and was interred at Oakwood Cemetery in Tyler.

U.S. House of Representatives
Preceded by George W. Whitmore	Member of the U.S. House of Representatives from Texas's 1st congressional district 1871–1875	Succeeded by John H. Reagan
