= Wagner model =

Wagner model is a rheological model developed for the prediction of the viscoelastic properties of polymers. It might be considered as a simplified practical form of the Bernstein-Kearsley-Zapas model. The model was developed by German rheologist Manfred Wagner.

For the isothermal conditions the model can be written as:

$$\mathbf{\sigma}(t) = -p \mathbf{I} + \int_{-\infty}^{t} M(t-t')h(I_1,I_2)\mathbf{B}(t')\, dt'$$

where:

- $\mathbf{\sigma}(t)$ is the Cauchy stress tensor as function of time t,
- p is the pressure
- $\mathbf{I}$ is the unity tensor
- M is the memory function showing, usually expressed as a sum of exponential terms for each mode of relaxation:

$M(x)=\sum_{k=1}^m \frac{g_i}{\theta_i}\exp(\frac{-x}{\theta_i})$, where for each mode of the relaxation, $g_i$ is the relaxation modulus and $\theta_i$ is the relaxation time;

- $h(I_1,I_2)$ is the strain damping function that depends upon the first and second invariants of Finger tensor $\mathbf{B}$.

The strain damping function is usually written as:

$$h(I_1,I_2)=m^*\exp(-n_1 \sqrt{I_1-3})+(1-m^*)\exp(-n_2 \sqrt{I_2-3})$$,

The strain hardening function equal to one, then the deformation is small and approaching zero, then the deformations are large.

The Wagner equation can be used in the non-isothermal cases by applying time-temperature shift factor.
