= Manfred Wagner =

German chemical engineer

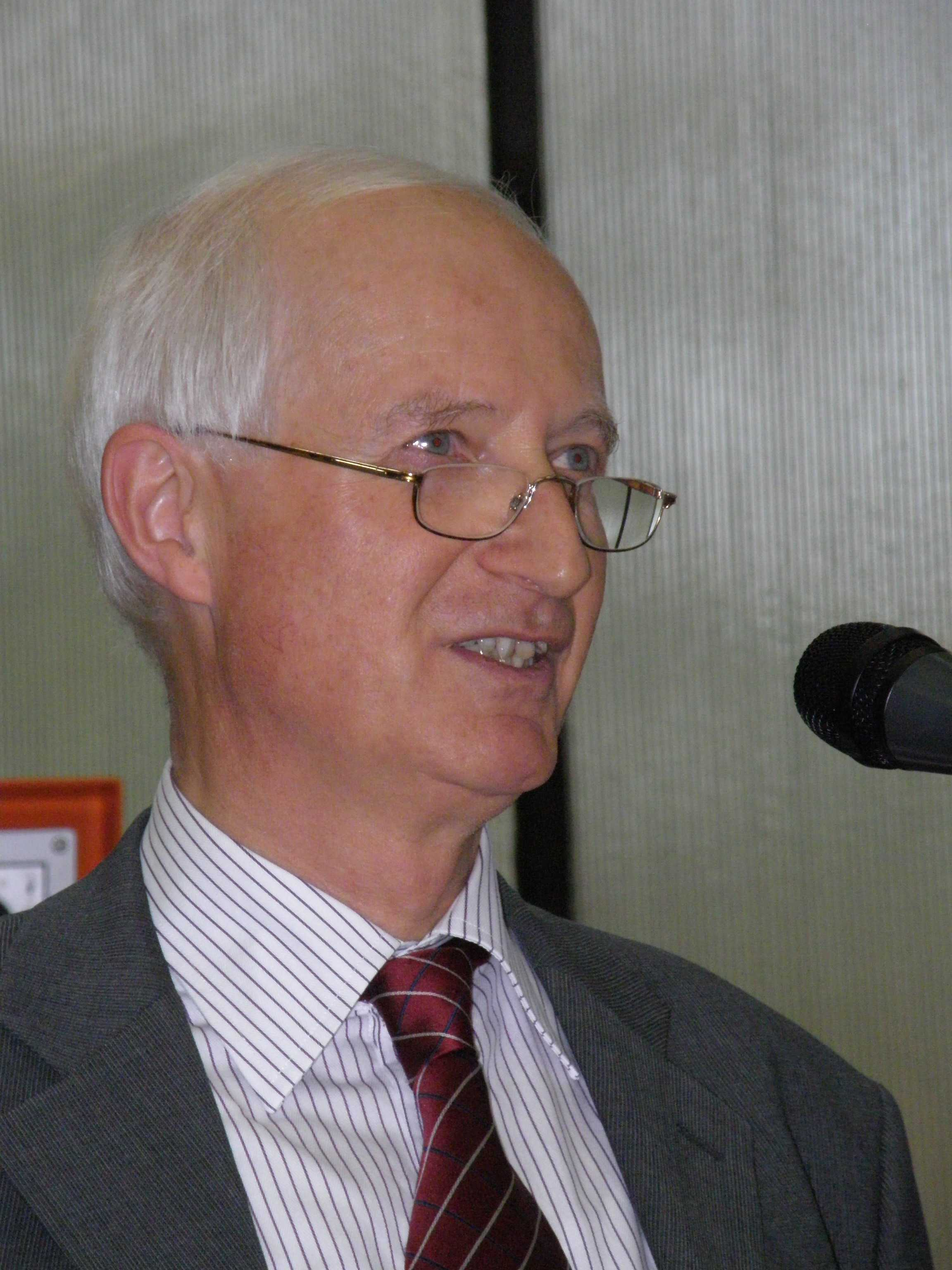
- Born: Manfred Hermann Wagner; 1948 (age 77–78); Stuttgart
- Education: University of Stuttgart
- Known for: Wagner model
- Scientific career
- Fields: Chemical engineering
- Workplaces: Technische Universität Berlin; University of Stuttgart

Manfred Hermann Wagner (born 1948) is the author of the Wagner model and the molecular stress function theory for polymer rheology. He was Professor for Polymer Engineering and Polymer Physics at Technische Universität Berlin.

Manfred was born in Stuttgart, Germany in 1948. He obtained his PhD in Chemical engineering at the Institute for Polymer Processing of Stuttgart University. He worked as a post-doc in Polymer Physics under Joachim Meissner at the Eidgenössische Technische Hochschule in Zurich, and after 9 years of industrial experience, he returned to Stuttgart University in 1988 as Professor for Fluid Dynamics and Rheology. In 1998–1999, he was Dean of the Faculty of Chemical Engineering and Engineering Cybernetics of Stuttgart University. In 1999, he moved to Technische Universität Berlin. From 2012-2016 he was Dean of Research of the Department of Process Engineering of TU Berlin.

His works include constitutive equations for polymer melts, the application of rheology to the processing of polymers, and structure-property relationships for polymers. The focus of his work on rheology is the field of non-linear shear and elongational behavior of polymer melts and effects of polydispersity, branching and blending on melt behavior. The outstanding point associated with Wagner's work is the relative simplicity of the structural picture of the polymer chain and its respective mathematical formulation.

His latest contribution to the constitutive modeling, the MSF (Molecular Stress Function) theory, assumes a microstructure-based damping function (developed by himself in the late 1970s) that modifies the tube model of Doi and Edwards by considering the tube diameter to change with deformation. This assumption overcomes the most important disadvantage of the DE theory and produces excellent predictions consistent with the picture of the polymer chain.

He has published to date over 300 papers https://scholar.google.com/scholar?hl=de&as_sdt=0%2C5&q=mh+wagner&btnG= on solid state physics, carbon and graphite technology, and rheology and processing of polymer melts. In 1981, he received the Annual Award of the British Society of Rheology, in 2002 the Swinbourne Award of the Institute of Materials, London, and in 2011 the Weissenberg Award of the European Society of Rheology. Since 2017 he is a Fellow of the Society of Rheology.

Prof. Wagner was President of the German Society of Rheology from 1991 to 2003, Secretary (1996 to 2005) and President (2005 to 2009) of the European Society of Rheology. From 2004 to 2016, he was Secretary of the International Committee on Rheology. In 2006, the East China University of Science and Technology (ECUST), Shanghai, awarded him the title of “Guest Professor”. Since 2013, he is a member of the International Academy of Engineering.

== Selected papers ==
Manfred Wagner publications indexed by Google Scholar
