= George Trenholm =

American politician and slaveholding planter (1807–1876)

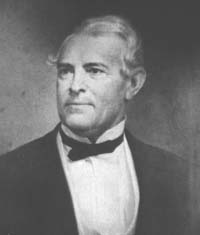

Confederate States Secretary of the Treasury
- In office July 18, 1864 – April 27, 1865
- President: Jefferson Davis
- Preceded by: Christopher Memminger
- Succeeded by: John Reagan (Acting)

Member of the South Carolina House of Representatives from the Charleston district
- In office 1852–1856
- In office 1860–1863
- In office 1874–1876

Personal details
- Born: February 25, 1807 Charleston, South Carolina, US
- Died: December 9, 1876 (aged 69) Charleston, South Carolina, US
- Party: Democratic
- Spouse: Anna Helen Holmes

George Alfred Trenholm (February 25, 1807 – December 9, 1876) was a South Carolina businessman, financier, politician, and slaveholding planter who owned several plantations and strongly supported the Confederate States of America. He was appointed as its Secretary of the Treasury during the final year of the American Civil War.

His merchant firm was estimated to have made $9 million by blockade running with its 60 ships during the war. Although he was imprisoned briefly after the war and suffered economic setbacks, Trenholm prospered. In the postwar years, Trenholm was a prominent philanthropist, aiding black and white South Carolinians. He also served on railroad and bank boards. He was elected to state office again in 1874 and died in office.

He was one of the few Confederate cabinet members who returned to political office in the United States after the Civil War.

== Early and family life ==
George Alfred Trenholm was born on February 25, 1807, in Charleston, South Carolina to Elizabeth Irene (de Greffin) Trenholm and her merchant husband, William Trenholm. His maternal grandfather, Comte de Greffin, was a major plantation owner in Saint Domingue (before the slave revolution; it is now Haiti). His paternal grandfather, William Trenholm (1737-1822), was born in Yorkshire, England, but he lived and worked in Charleston most of his adult life. He was forced to leave during the American Revolutionary War due to his Loyalist sympathies and business associations. He lived in New York, the Netherlands, and Santo Domingo, but returned to Charleston in 1785, shortly after the war's end, and lived there for another 37 years. He introduced his son William (1772-1824) into the family business. When his father died, George Trenholm left school and went into business.

At age 21, George Alfred Trenholm married Anna Helen Holmes on April 3, 1828. Her father, John Holmes, owned a plantation on Johns Island, South Carolina. The couple had thirteen children; five (including their first four) died in infancy. In 1860, their daughters Emily (b. 1839), Anna (b. 1842), Eliza (b. 1848), Christiana (b. 1851), and sons Alfred (b. 1844), Frances (b. 1846), Edwin (b. 1850) were still living with their parents. Also in the household were their married eldest son William Trenholm (b. 1846), his wife, their young sons, and Anna's mother.

== Career ==
At 16, George Trenholm had begun working for a major cotton broker, John Fraser and Company in Charleston. He rose to become a partner, and by 1853, when he was 46, he led the company. Fraser died in 1854, and it became Fraser and Trenholm. By 1860 Trenholm became one of the wealthiest men in the Southern United States, owning real estate worth $90,000 (equivalent to $3,225,000 in 2025) and personal property (including enslaved people) valued at about $35,000 (equivalent to $1,254,167 in 2025). His financial investments included steamships, hotels, wharves, cotton and plantations. Trenholm's family enslaved about 39 persons as domestic staff Trenholm was also director of the Bank of Charleston and a South Carolina railroad.

A member of the Democratic Party, Trenholm was elected to the South Carolina legislature in 1852 and served until 1856. After President Abraham Lincoln's election in 1860, Trenholm strongly supported the secession of the Confederacy, which South Carolina led among the top six of the major slave states.

=== American Civil War ===
When the American Civil War broke out, Trenholm immediately moved his company's head office from New York to the Bahamas and Bermuda. He was appointed to South Carolina's State Marine Battery Commission, where he oversaw the construction of the Confederate ironclad Chicora. Trenholm personally financed the construction of a twelve-vessel flotilla for Charleston's defense.

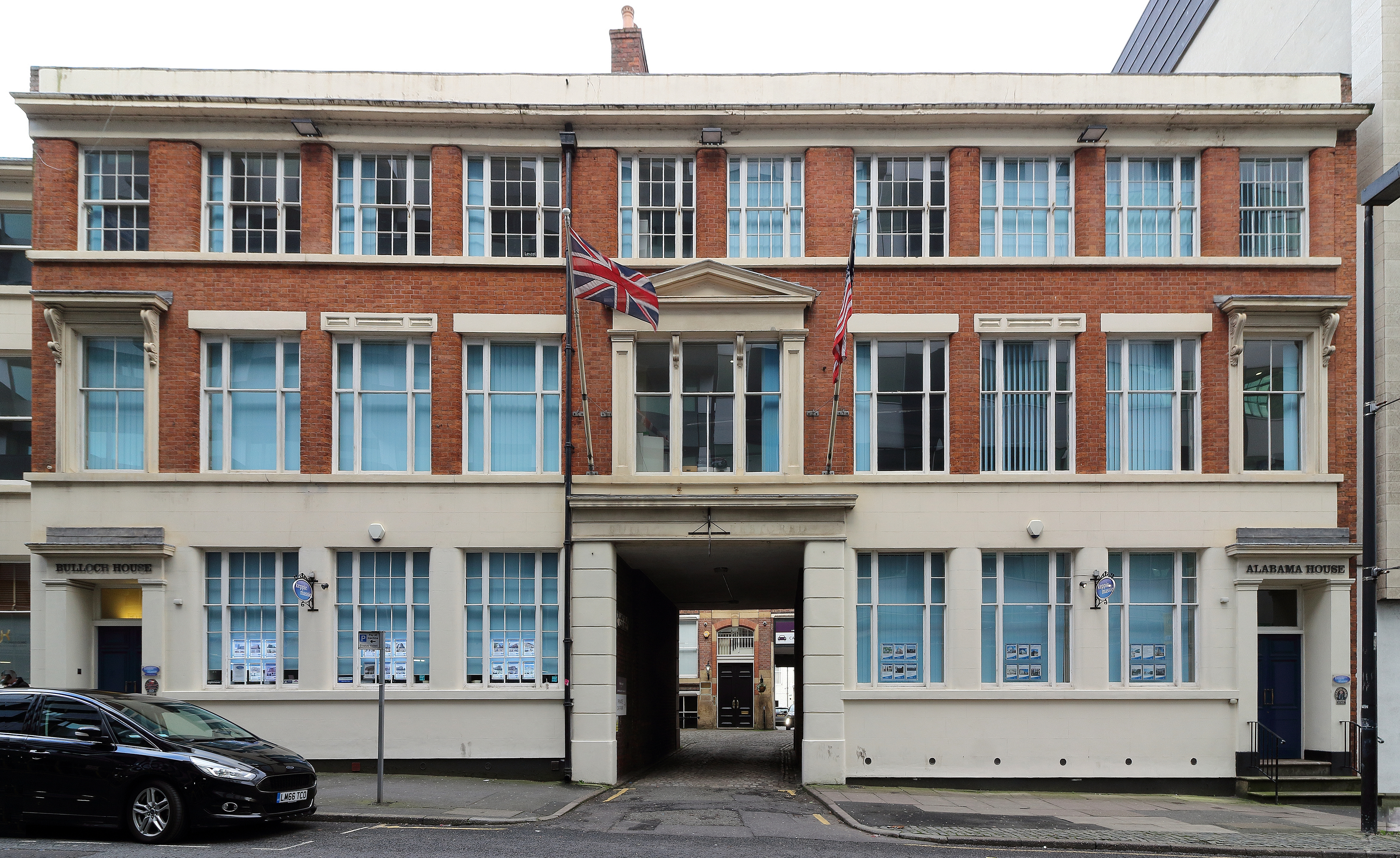
Former offices of Fraser, Trenholm & Co. in Rumford Place, Liverpool (photographed in 2019).

Trenholm's wealth increased as his 60 commercial ships ran the U.S. Navy blockade. The ships carried cotton, tobacco, and turpentine to England and brought back coal, iron, salt, guns, and ammunition. Josiah Gorgas, the Confederate chief of ordnance, estimated that by March 1863, Trenholm's company had made $9 million (equivalent to $95 million in 2025) by blockade running. His company - now called Fraser, Trenholm and Company - became the Confederate government's overseas banker. The office in Liverpool arranged cotton sales and financed its own fleet. The U.S. consul in Liverpool, Thomas Dudley, estimated Trenholm's fleet imported $4.5 million of cotton into Great Britain. However, Confederate President Jefferson Davis vetoed Trenholm's suggestion that the Confederacy buy decommissioned British East India Company ships for $10 million.

Trenholm and his Liverpool-based partner Charles K. Prioleau (son of a Charleston lawyer) worked with fellow American James Dunwoody Bulloch as Confederate foreign agents in Britain to manage their arrangements, especially shipping munitions home. Britain depended on the South's cotton exports. Continuing cotton exports to Britain helped the Confederacy financially and shaped British public opinion toward the Confederate cause.

Trenholm served again in the South Carolina legislature from 1860 to 1863. In 1863, he purchased the Annandale Plantation from Andrew Johnstone; located south of Georgetown, it was a highly successful rice operation that had worked 230 enslaved people in the 1850s.

In January 1864, Trenholm's daughter Emily married William Miles Hazzard, a Confederate scout. Trenholm deeded the Annandale and Beneventum plantations to Hazzard shortly after the war's end, trying to protect them from potential confiscation by the United States government.

Confederate Treasury Secretary Christopher Memminger, a fellow Charlestonian and friend, used Trenholm as an unofficial adviser for almost four years. When Memminger resigned on July 1, 1864 (due to public outcry after he issued millions of Confederate bank notes at one-third the value of the old ones), and moved back to Flat Rock, North Carolina, Trenholm succeeded him. He was formally appointed on July 18, 1864. Trenholm was a more charismatic figure than his predecessor. Together with his constant published updates, he had better press relations and contact with the Confederate Congress. Trenholm had a "never give up the ship" personality but could do little to stop the financial havoc as the rebel government grew insolvent and printing money caused inflation. Trenholm advocated direct taxation, reducing the circulation of paper currency, further public subscriptions for war bonds, and purchasing blockade runners (rather than continuing to rely on private shippers), but the Confederate Congress refused to pass those measures.

He signed off on payments for Confederate spies, including operations in Canada and Washington, D.C., as well as for the defense of Richmond, Virginia. He moved to the Confederate capital after severing ties with his businesses in Charleston. Trenholm arranged for a large loan to the Confederate government from a French consortium, but the proceeds arrived too late to assist their war effort.

Trenholm's lavish entertaining in Richmond (at the house that later became the Valentine Museum) and paying for a massive Christmas dinner (postponed until New Year's Day 1865) endeared him to Richmond's elite. On February 6, 1865, the Confederate Congress proposed to President Jefferson Davis that he fire his entire cabinet except for Trenholm. Davis declined, but Secretary of War James A. Seddon resigned and was replaced by General John C. Breckinridge.

=== Flight from Richmond ===
During the war's final days, Trenholm arranged for the Confederate treasury, archives, and bullion owned by it and Richmond banks to be transported from the imperiled capital into North Carolina by a train guarded by Captain William Howard Parker and Confederate naval midshipmen. The bullion and specie were later estimated to be worth between a quarter to a half million dollars. The last published account of it reported $86,000 in specie hidden in the false bottom of a carriage and entrusted to James A. Semple, a Naval paymaster and son-in-law of ex-President John Tyler. He was supposed to take it to Liverpool to pay Confederate accounts. Secretary of State Judah Benjamin used a $1,500 gold warrant signed by Trenholm to secure his passage on a boat to Britain.

Other accounts trace $40,000 used by Major Raphael J. Moses (General Longstreet's commissary officer) to assist Confederate veterans struggling to return home. Some believe Trenholm ordered the bullion dumped off railroad bridges on the journey described below (noting his son William patented a hydroscope for finding lost items in the water after the war), or had money smuggled to England by Sylvester Mumford (who later returned to Georgia, where it became an endowment to educate orphans), or taken to Canada.

Trenholm sent his daughters out of Richmond on Friday, April 3, 1865, with First Lady Varina Davis by train, escorted by midshipman James Morris Morgan (who would later marry one of the Trenholm daughters). The women rode to Charlotte, North Carolina and then reached a rented house in Abbeville, South Carolina, where they met their brother William Trenholm and his family. Though ill, George Trenholm (with his wife as his nurse, the only woman among 30 male officials) evacuated Richmond on Sunday night, April 5, 1865, bound for Danville, Virginia, on the same train as the rest of the Confederate government. He was said to have self-medicated with peach brandy, shared with fellow travelers, and morphine.

Days later, Trenholm was transported by ambulance to another train carrying the Confederate government into North Carolina, where they learned President Abraham Lincoln had been assassinated on April 14. Eventually, the Confederate government, including Trenholm, reached Fort Mill, South Carolina. Upon hearing of General Robert E. Lee's surrender at Appomattox Court House, Virginia on April 9, the local commander in Charlotte, North Carolina, General John Echols, had offered his troops the choice of surrendering or continuing to fight. Half his cavalry and almost all infantry left for home. Only 1,000 men followed General Echols to meet with President Jefferson Davis and the remaining Confederate cabinet members in Fort Mill. Trenholm asked President Davis to accept his resignation, citing his ill health, and Davis accepted with his thanks on April 27, 1865.

=== Imprisonment and parole ===
Trenholm had six rice plantations to manage in Georgetown County, South Carolina, having bought many in 1863 before assuming his public role. He traveled from Abbeville to South Carolina College in Columbia, South Carolina for the wedding on June 1, 1865 of his son Frank to Mary Elizabeth Burroughs in the house of the college president. Trenholm, his wife, and daughters moved into their newly purchased estate, now named DeGreffin, near Columbia, South Carolina. U.S. Army troops had burned it in a raid. They left the Abbeville house to William and his family.

Around June 12, a U.S. officer asked Trenholm to come to them in Charleston to answer questions. Escorted by his future son-in-law James M. Morgan (or by his son William, under alternate accounts) and carrying a bag of gold pieces, Trenholm drove to Orangeburg, South Carolina. He took the train to Charleston, where he was arrested at the depot and escorted to jail by United States Colored Troops on June 13. The U.S. government accused him of making off with millions in Confederate assets. He was soon joined in jail by Theodore Dehon Wagner, the manager of Trenholm, Fraser & Co.

Trenholm was briefly imprisoned at Hilton Head, South Carolina, but General Quincy Gillmore, who knew him and of his kindnesses toward U.S. prisoners during the war and recognizing his physical disability, issued him a written parole on June 25 to allow him to return to his home and the corporate limits of Columbia, South Carolina. In July, Gillmore was relieved of his command, and Trenholm was arrested again on July 12. Secretary of War Edwin Stanton suspected him of involvement in President Lincoln's assassination.

Blockade runners Theodore Jervey and A.S. Johnson were also arrested in July. Trenholm was imprisoned at Fort Pulaski, near Savannah, Georgia. He was allowed guests, including many former high Confederate officials. Fellow prisoners included James A. Seddon, David Yulee, R.M.T. Hunter, former Florida governor A.K. Allison, Charles Clark of Mississippi, A.G. Magrath, and assistant Secretary of War, James A. Campbell—all of whom were allowed liberty around the island after giving their parole of honor on August 21.

=== Postwar business, charity and politics ===
Pardoned by President Andrew Johnson and ordered released on October 11, 1865 (along with Clark, Campbell, Confederate Vice President Alexander Stephens, and Postmaster John H. Reagan of Texas), Trenholm returned to his business. Manager James Welsman had been pardoned in August. On September 29, President Johnson had ordered property returned to Charleston firms, including Trenholm's, over the objection of Quartermaster General Montgomery C. Meigs. U.S. lawyers filed suit in Britain against the firm's assets to recover funds and against several principals, including T.D. Wagner and Charles Prioleau. The U.S. Government sued Canada for reparations for damages caused by British firms acting on behalf of the Confederacy but settled claims including $3 million for damages to U.S. shipping by the British-built CSS Alabama.

Trenholm's son Fred sailed home from England to attend his sister Helen's wedding to James Morris Morgan. Trenholm also created trusts and deeded plantations to his children and their spouses. The U.S. government ultimately confiscated some of these properties based on the failure of the Trenholm firm to pay customs duties on the many items imported by blockade runners during the war.

Trenholm's cotton brokerage firm went bankrupt in 1867. It successfully reorganized as George A. Trenholm & Son and shifted to take advantage of the state's postwar phosphate mining boom. Trenholm was elected as a director of the Blue Ridge Railroad in 1868; the railroad was planned to link Charleston and the American Midwest, but it reportedly went bankrupt due to embezzlement by an official who escaped to the North. It was also likely to have been mismanaged, as the southern railroads were over-capitalized in this period.

In the postwar period, Trenholm became known for his philanthropy to blacks and whites in the South Carolina Low County. He wrote in 1865 that emancipation of blacks was necessary and argued for their uplift. Many South Carolinians were unhappy with Congressional Reconstruction and governor Robert Kingston Scott. He led an effort to invest in public welfare and infrastructure, which resulted in a trebling of state debt as there had been little public investment before the war. He survived an impeachment vote. Voters elected Trenholm to the South Carolina legislature in 1874, and he died in office.

The 1874 campaign season for governor was filled with violence as white Democrats worked to suppress the black Republican vote. The paramilitary Red Shirts were armed and rode openly in groups; they were particularly militant and succeeded in intimidating many black voters. Despite the black Republican majority, Democrat Wade Hampton III, a former Confederate general, was elected governor. White Democrats retained state legislature control for most of the following century.

== Death and legacy ==
Trenholm died in Charleston on December 9, 1876, and he was buried in Magnolia Cemetery. The Library of Congress holds the Confederate Treasury's records, many created by Trenholm.

North Carolina erected a historical highway marker near his estate Solitude, where he and Memminger spent summers during his final years. Trenholm is the great-great-grandfather of Virginia politician Charles S. "Chuck" Robb.

== Gone with the Wind ==
Popular legend suggests that Trenholm and his exploits inspired Margaret Mitchell's character of Rhett Butler in her novel Gone with the Wind.

== See also ==
- Blockade runners of the American Civil War
- James Dunwoody Bulloch

== Bibliography ==
- Bulloch, James D. (2001). The Secret Service of the Confederate States in Europe. New York: Random House International. ISBN 0-679-64022-3.
- Patrick, Rembert W. (1944). Jefferson Davis and His Cabinet. Baton Rouge: Louisiana State University Press. pp. 234–243.
- Spence, E. Lee (1995). Treasures of the Confederate Coast: The "Real Rhett Butler" & Other Revelations. Miami: Narwhal Press. ISBN 1-886391-01-7.
- Spencer, Warren F. (1983). The Confederate Navy In Europe. University, Alabama: University of Alabama Press. ISBN 0-8173-0861-X.
- Wise, Stephen R. (1988). Lifeline of the Confederacy; Blockade Running during the Civil War. Columbia, SC: University of South Carolina. ISBN 978-0872495548.

Political offices
Preceded by Christopher Memminger	Confederate States Secretary of the Treasury; 1864–1865	Succeeded by John Reagan; Acting
