= Ralf Zerback =

German historian and author (born 1961)

Ralf Zerback (born 1961) is a German historian, writer and author.

Ralf Zerback was born in Stuttgart. He studied history in Frankfurt and Heidelberg. He was a pupil of the historian Lothar Gall. He wrote his doctoral thesis about the bourgeoisie of Munich in the 19th century. Zerback works as a journalist for Die Zeit and author in Frankfurt.

In 2022, he published Triumph der Gewalt: Drei deutsche Jahre 1932 bis 1934 on the Nazi's early reign of power in Germany.

== Books ==
- Reformpläne und Repressionspolitik 1830-1834, 2003, ISBN 3-486-56658-X
- Robert Blum, Lehmstedt Verlag, Leipzig, 2007, ISBN 978-3-937146-45-4
- Triumph der Gewalt: Drei deutsche Jahre 1932 bis 1934, 2022, ISBN 978-3608986488
