= Maria Walter =

German politician

Maria Walter (born Maria Harm: 27 September 1895 - 1 May 1988) was a German politician (KPD).

== Life ==
Maria Harm was born in Degerloch, by that time a quarter in the city of Stuttgart, the capital of the semi-autonomous Kingdom of Württemberg. She attended school locally between 1901 and 1909, and then undertook factory and office work. She was employed until 1926 by the shoe manufacturer Schuhfabrik Haueisen & Cie AG at their Degerloch and nearby Bad Cannstatt locations.

She married Ludwig Walter in 1916 and joined the newly launched Communist Party (KPD) in 1920. She became a member of the regional leadership of the para-military Red Women's and Girls' League ("RFMB-Gauleitung") and was also, for a time, chair of the RFMB in Württemberg. Within the mainstream party, between 1928 and 1933 she was head of the women's department of the regional leadership team ("Bezirksleitung").

Maria Walter was elected a member of the Regional Parliament ("Landtag von Württemberg"), representing the Communist Party, in 1932. She had also, by this time, participated in 1930 in a course for party officers at the Communist Party's national academy ("Reichsparteischule") in Berlin-Fichtenau.

Régime change in January 1933 marked he start of a rapid transition to one-party dictatorship. The Reichstag fire in February 1933 was blamed in "communists" with an implausible level of immediacy, and was followed by the arrest of people who had been identified as politically active Communist Party members during the Weimar years. Maria Walter emigrated to Switzerland. However, at the beginning of September 1934 she returned to Stuttgart - according to one source on health grounds. In November 1939 and again in June 1944 she was arrested and detained for a number of weeks. Subsequently, she was no longer politically involved.

Maria Walter died on 1 May 1988 in Stuttgart.
