= Confederate States Secretary of the Treasury =

- Seal of the Confederate States

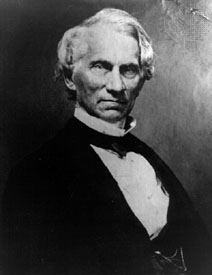
- Longest serving Christopher Memminger; February 21, 1861 – July 18, 1864
- Confederate States Department of the Treasury
- Style: Mr. Secretary
- Status: Abolished
- Member of: The Cabinet
- Reports to: The president
- Seat: Richmond, Virginia
- Appointer: The president with Senate advice and consent
- Term length: No fixed term
- Formation: 21 February 1861
- First holder: Christopher Memminger
- Final holder: John Henninger Reagan
- Abolished: 10 May 1865

The Confederate States secretary of the treasury was the head of the Confederate States Department of the Treasury. Three men served in this post throughout the Confederacy's brief existence from 1861 to 1865.

== List of secretaries of the treasury ==
No.	Portrait	Name (Born-Died)	Term of office			Political party (Note: While organized political parties did not exist in the Confederacy, most Confederate leaders were members of the Democratic Party before and after the American Civil War.)	Ref.
No.	Portrait	Name (Born-Died)	Took office	Left office	Time in office	Political party	Ref.
1		Christopher Memminger (1803–1888)	February 21, 1861	July 18, 1864	3 years, 148 days	Democrat	
2		George Trenholm (1807–1876)	July 18, 1864	April 27, 1865	283 days	Democrat	
3		John Henninger Reagan (1818–1906)	April 27, 1865	May 10, 1865	13 days	Democrat	

== See also ==
- United States Secretary of the Treasury
