= Fernando Raposo =

French basketball player

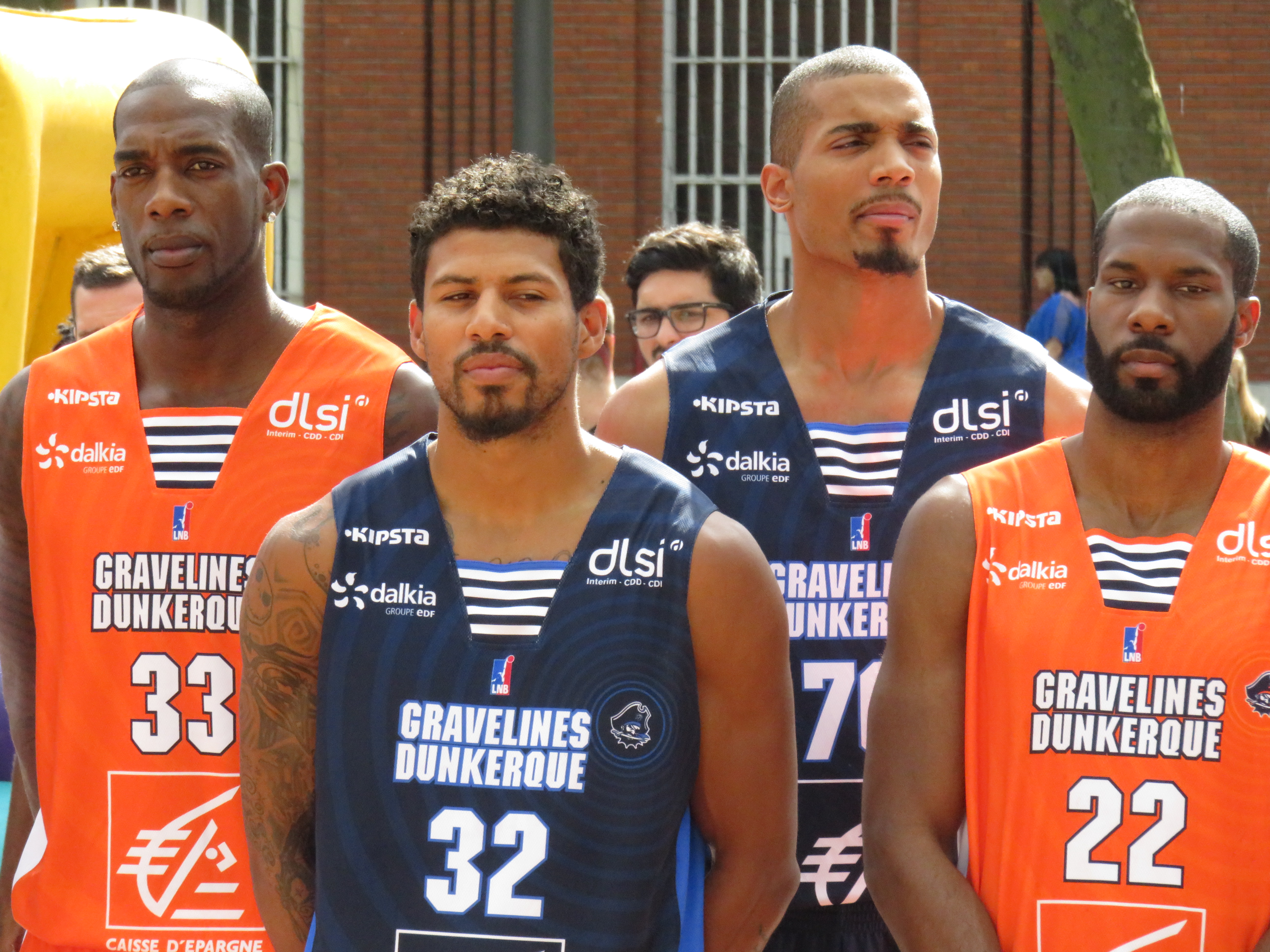
- Fernando Raposo, No. 70

Free Agent
- Position: Center

Personal information
- Born: 7 July 1989 (age 37) Stuttgart, West Germany
- Listed height: 6 ft 9 in (2.06 m)

Career information
- NBA draft: 2011: undrafted
- Playing career: 2006–present

Career history
- 2006–2010: Élan Béarnais Pau-Orthez
- 2010–2012: S.O.M. Boulonnais
- 2012–2015: Orléans Loiret Basket
- 2015–2016: JSF Nanterre
- 2016–2018: BCM Gravelines
- 2018–2020: Antibes Sharks

Career highlights
- LNB Pro B champion (2010)

Fernando Raposo (born 7 July 1989), sometimes known as Nando Raposo, is a French professional basketball player. He lastly played for Antibes Sharks of the LNB Pro A league.
