= Matthias Megyeri =

German designer

- Born: 1973 (age 51–52); Stuttgart, West Germany
- Occupation: Designer

Matthias Megyeri (born 1973 in Stuttgart, West Germany,) is an artist and designer of security products, dubbed "placebo products" that mix cuteness with defensive design.

His work has been shown at Museum of Modern Art in New York.

== Career ==
At the end of the 1980s, Megyeri was one of the protagonists of the Stuttgart graffiti and hip-hop scene as a sprayer under the name MASEEE, which later became Kolchose. Megyeri studied visual communication from 1995 to 2001 at the University of Design in Karlsruhe with Gunter Rambow (Political Poster) and Kurt Weidemann. He then studied Critical Design at the Royal College of Art from 2001 to 2003 with Ron Arad, Anthony Dunne and Noam Toran. For his master's thesis, he developed the first prototypes of the Sweet Dreams Security® series. This project gave rise to the security company of the same name. Mergyeri's work received international media attention, and was shown in museums and institutions worldwide. At the end of 2008, Matthias Megyeri returned to Stuttgart on the occasion of a fellowship at the Akademie Schloss Solitude. Since 2011, Megyeri has been working as a freelance artist with a focus on installation in public spaces and art on buildings. He is also active internationally as a lecturer, workshop leader and juror.
