= Marc C. Woehr =

German contemporary artist (born 1973)

Marc C. Woehr (pronounced [wöhr]; born December 29, 1973, in Heilbronn) is a German contemporary artist known for his sculptural wooden relief constructions and monumental city paintings. The former graffiti sprayer now exhibits in international galleries and art fairs.

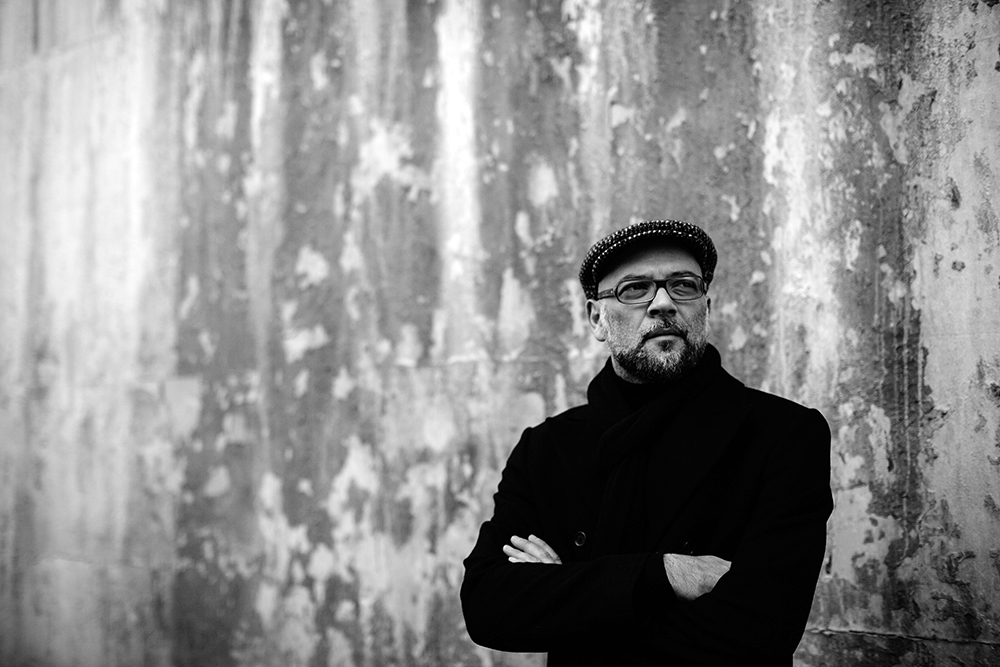
Marc C. Woehr, Madrid, 2018

== Early career ==
Immersed in the local skateboarding culture of Stuttgart Germany in the late 1980s Woehr began his artistic career as a traditional graffiti artist, tagging walls around the city. Moving from graffiti art to the studio in 2000 Woehr started to experiment with painting on canvas and constructing sculptural dioramas. Working in these modes of expression Woehr sought to capture the dynamism of the urban experience and environment. Recognized for his artistic talent in 2010 Woehr was chosen, along with four other artists, to represent Germany in the Fine Art international art exhibition, an arts initiative and traveling exhibition created to celebrate the FIFA World Cup of the same year.

== Career and influence ==
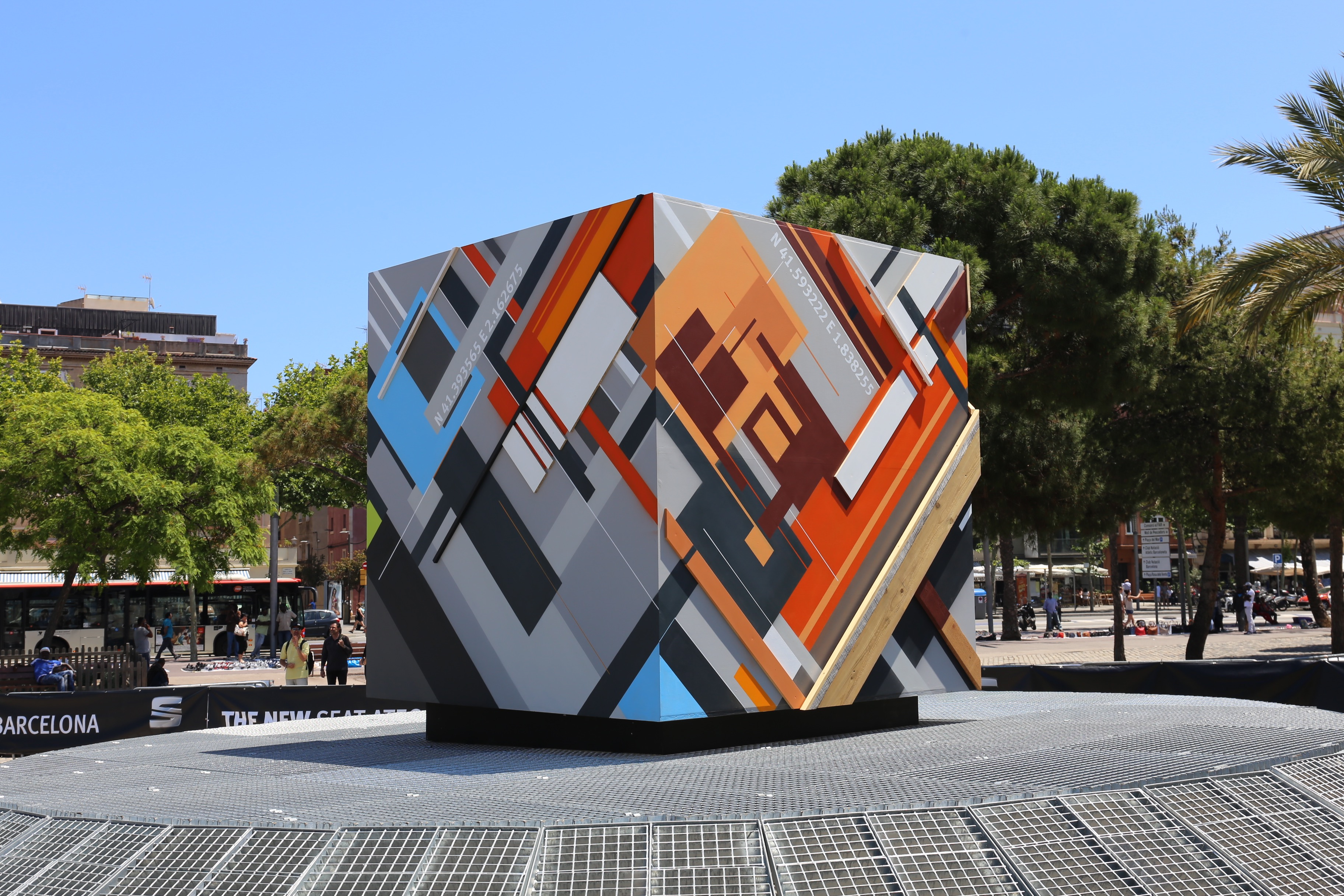
Marc C. Woehr, "N 41.593222 E1.838255", wood and spray paint, created in Barcelona, 2016

In 2013 Woehr sought new means to treat the city, his urban subject matter. His abstract images depict a bird's eye view, a vision which represents the fundamental essence of an urban experience Woehr eschews realistic depictions, alternatively restructuring and reshaping the streets and architecture of a particular city he has visited in a style reminiscent of the Russian Constructivists, like Kazimir Malevich, El Lissitzky, Vladimir Tatlin and the artists of the Bauhaus such as Lászlo Moholy-Nagy, from whom he draws inspiration. By titling each work with a location's geographic or GPS coordinates, Woehr invites viewer participation, research and exploration of the subject city. While each work is a translation of the artist's personal connection with a particular city, the receding dimensionality of each multi-layer image leaves the viewer a conceptual space for her own interpretation. Although he works primarily in the studio, Woehr remains close to the urban landscape continuing to paint outside on city walls, buildings, trains and large-scale sculptures. These works achieve the same objectives as his sculptural reliefs, as he crafts the illusion of the three-dimensional space in these painted constructions. Painted on a monumental scale this work envelops the viewer, inviting her into a newly conceived urban environment and experience.

== Artistic process and technique ==
Embracing technology Woehr employs computers to aid in the design and formulation of his complex relief constructions. Borrowing from contemporary industrial manufacturing processes, computer driven lasers are then used to cut the multiple layers of paper, cardboard or wood that make up each design. The artist then painstakingly constructs the three-dimensional space of each individual work, arranging and assembling each layer by hand. The finished work of art reflects a unique combination of the artist's hand and creativity together with the precision and clarity inherent in computer generated design and fabrication. When working with reclaimed wood Woehr differences his artistic process creating these sculptures freehand, respecting the inherent idiosyncrasies of found, reclaimed materials.

== Exhibitions ==
- 2005: Gemeinsam Leben, Group Show, Ministry for Social Affairs Baden-Württemberg, Stuttgart, Germany.
- 2008: Exhibition for Urban Arts, Carhartt Gallery, Weil am Rhein, Germany.
- 2008: Primary Flight, MODART, Miami Art Basel, Miami Beach, USA.
- 2008: MODART, Art Basel, Basel, Switzerland.
- 2009: 20 Years Fall of the Berlin Wall, Berlin, Germany.
- 2009: Old Skollin for the Children, ART WHINO, Washington DC, USA.
- 2009: Frerk & Marc C Woehr, Carmichael Gallery, Los Angeles, USA
- 2009: Inked Souls, ART WHINO, Washington DC, USA.
- 2010: International Fine Art Collection, touring exhibition, opening in Africa.
- 2010: G40: The Summit, ART WHINO, Washington DC, USA.
- 2010: Art.Fair21 Blooom, Die Kunstagentin, Cologne, Germany.
- 2011: Dirty Works Volume II, 30works Galerie, Cologne, Germany
- 2012: International Art Festival, Kerteminde, Denmark.
- 2012: Stroke, Urban Art Gallery, Munich, Germany.
- 2012: Solo, Urban Art Gallery, Stuttgart, Germany.
- 2012: Parallax AF, Urban Art Gallery, London, UK.
- 2012: Affordable Art Fair Milano, L’art Industriel, Milan, Italy.
- 2013: Stroke, Urban Art Fair, Munich, Germany.
- 2014: Flashback, Solo Show, Urban Art Gallery, Stuttgart, Germany.
- 2014: Dirty Works Volume 5, 30works Galerie, Cologne, Germany.
- 2014: Millerntor Gallery, Viva con Agua, Hamburg, Germany.
- 2014: City Vibes, WOW-WilliBender Gallery, Heidelberg, Germany.
- 2014: Urban Playground, Urban Art Gallery, Stuttgart, Germany.
- 2015: Superfine, Image Gallery NYC, Miami Art Basel, Miami Beach, USA.
- 2015: Berliner Liste, Galerie Kerstan, Berlin, Germany.
- 2015: Die Grenzlandaustellung, Group Show, Kunstverein Apenrade, Apenrade, Denmark
- 2015: Varietas, Group Show, Galerie Mauritiushof, Bad Zurzach, Switzerland.
- 2015: Urban Beauty, Group Show, Urban Art Gallery, Stuttgart, Germany.
- 2016: 8e Avenue, From Graffiti to Relief, Urban Art Gallery, Paris, Frankreich.
- 2016: Coming from the Basics, ARTCAN GALLERY, Group Show, Montpellier, Frankreich.
- 2016: Urban Art Fair, Urban Art Gallery, Paris, Frankreich.
- 2017: Urbstractions, Pretty Portal Gallery, Düsseldorf, Germany.
- 2017: Art Elysees, Galerie ANGE BASSO, Paris, Frankreich.
- 2017: Urban Art Fair, Urban Art Gallery, Paris, Frankreich.
- 2017: Art Up, Urban Art Gallery, Lille, Frankreich.
- 2017: Urvanity Art Fair, Urban Art Gallery, Madrid, Spanien.
- 2018: Scope Art Fair, Urban Art Gallery, Basel, Switzerland.
- 2018: Urban Art Fair, Galerie Pretty Portal, Paris, Frankreich.
- 2018: Urvanity Art Fair, Urban Art Gallery, Madrid, Spanien.
- 2018: Art Up, Galerie ANGE BASSO, Lille, Frankreich.
- 2019: Marc C. Woehr & Friends, Urban Art Gallery Pop-up, Stuttgart, Germany.
