= Friedrich Wilhelm Seiffer =

German neurologist and psychiatrist

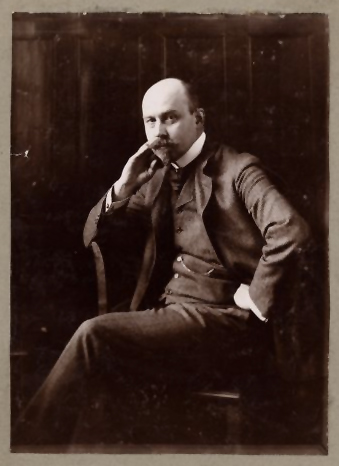
Friedrich Wilhelm Seiffer

Friedrich Wilhelm Seiffer (18 April 1872 – 30 November 1917) was a German neurologist and psychiatrist born in Stuttgart.

In 1895 he received his medical doctorate from the University of Strasbourg, and subsequently worked at a private mental health institution in Pankow-Berlin. In 1896 he was an assistant to Eduard Hitzig (1838–1907) at the psychiatric hospital in Halle. In 1899 he began work at the psychiatric clinic of the Berlin-Charité, where he worked under Friedrich Jolly (1844–1904) and Theodor Ziehen (1862–1950).

After his habilitation in 1901, he became a lecturer at the University of Berlin. In 1906 he became a titular professor. Today, his name is associated with the "Rydel-Seiffer tuning fork", an instrument used for monitoring and diagnosis of nervous disorders.

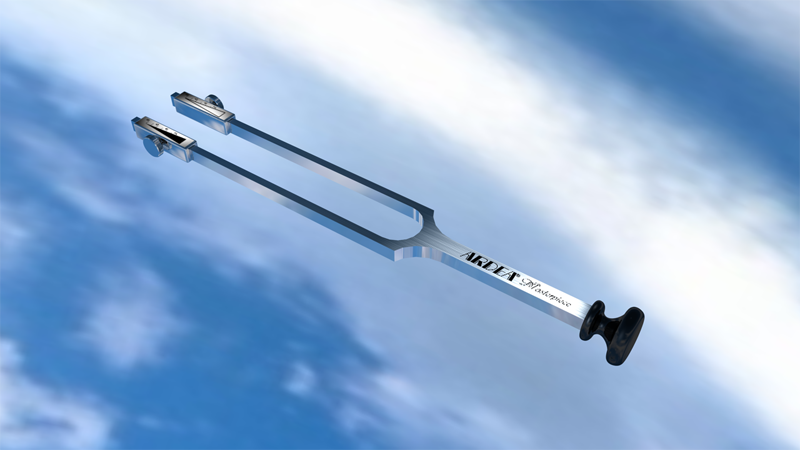
"Rydel-Seiffer stimmgabel" (tuning fork)

== Selected publications ==
- Die Sensibilitätsstörungen der Haut bei Visceralerkrankungen; Translation and edition of Henry Head's treatise- "On the disturbances of sensation, with special reference to the pain of visceral disease".
- Spinales Sensibilitätsschema für die Segmentdiagnose der Rückenmarkskrankheiten zum Einzeichnen der Befunde am Krankenbett. (Spinal sensitivity schema for the segmental diagnosis of spinal cord diseases, pertaining to findings at the bedside), 1901.
- Atlas und Grundriss der allgemeinen Diagnostik und Therapie der Nervenkrankheiten (Atlas and layout for general diagnosis and treatment of nervous diseases), 1902.
- Untersuchungen über das Vibrationsgefühl oder die sog. Knochensensibilität (Pallästhesie). (Studies on the sense of vibration or the so-called "bone sensitivity") with A. Rydel, In: Archiv für Psychiatrie und Nervenkrankheiten (1903).
- Über die Geschwülste des Kleinhirns und der hinteren Schädelgrube (Concerning tumors of the cerebellum and the posterior fossa), 1907.
