= Kulturkaufhaus Dussmann =

Architectural structure in Berlin, Germany

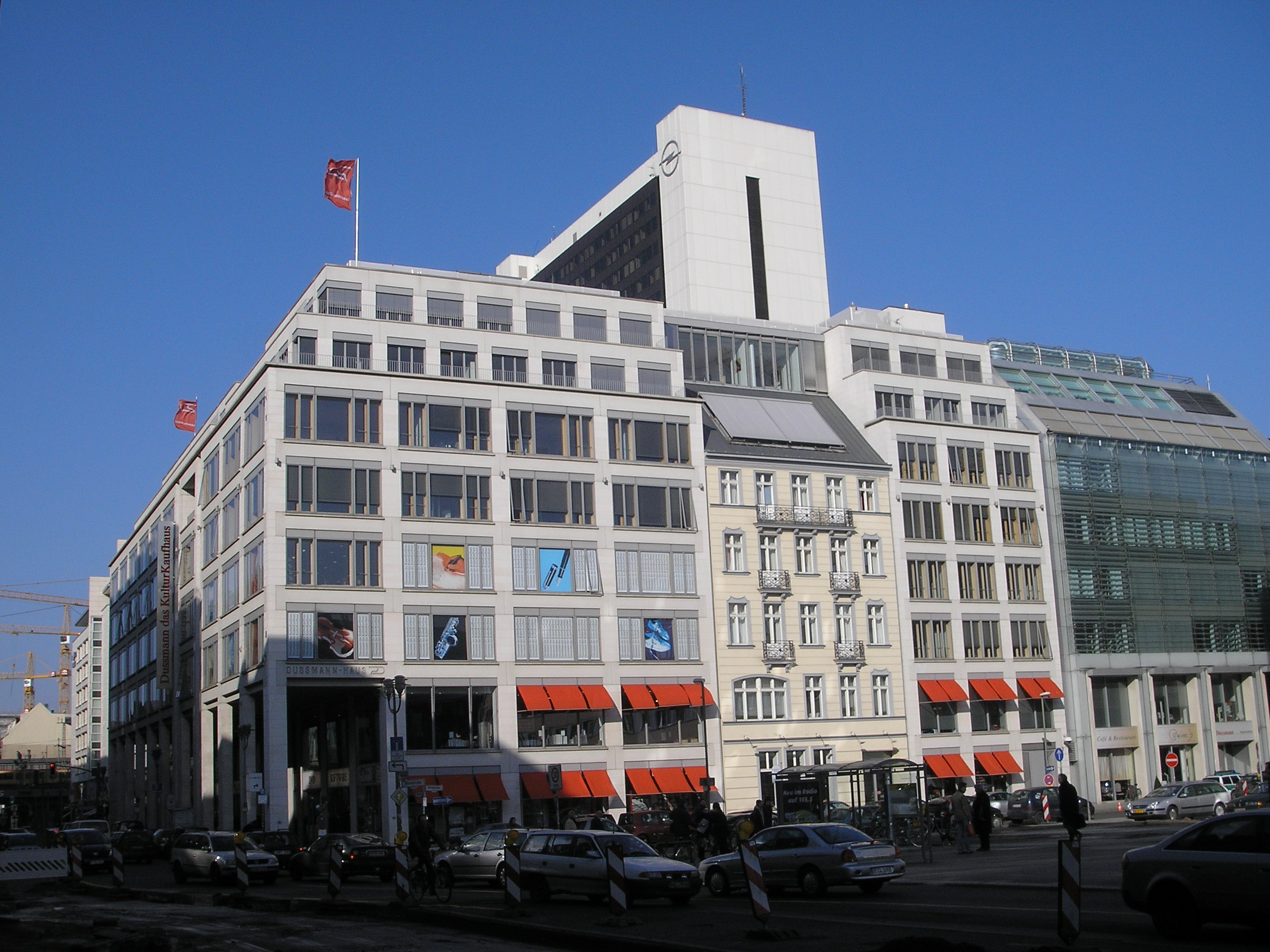
Kulturkaufhaus Dussmann

The Kulturkaufhaus Dussmann (Dussmann culture department store) is a commercial building in Berlin. It was completed in 1997 on Friedrichstraße and Dorotheenstraße in the Mitte district. It was named after its builder and first main user, the entrepreneur Peter Dussmann. Today, the building houses a media department store on five floors and various offices, including the headquarters of the Dussmann Group.

== History ==
There were rows of buildings in the Wilhelminian style on the site, until they were destroyed by bombing in World War II. In the late 1940s, the war ruins were cleared away. At this point, individual residential buildings remained and a wasteland that was largely left to itself for decades. After the fall of the Wall, the service company Dussmann re-established itself in East Berlin, and the management was looking for a location for a new office building.

The new building in the centre of Berlin was opened in 1997. The plan was to rent the lower floors to a bookseller or a fashion chain. When no interested party was found, the developer decided to use the sales floors himself. The building was first named Dussmann-Haus, and later Kulturkaufhaus Dussmann (Dussmann cultural department store).

Initially, 4,700 m² were filled with a mix of media, with the classical department being the largest of its kind in Europe. In its first year, Dussmann had two million customers, made a turnover of 28 million DM and was unexpectedly close to breaking even early. In 2004, the converted third floor, which had previously housed offices of the Dussmann Group, was opened to visitors. The special department for music in a side building was significantly expanded in 2008. In 2010, a concentrated offer of foreign language materials began. Management initially set up an English-language department in a side wing. By the 2010s, books including audio books and sheet music, CDs, DVDs and other office supplies (called Papétrie) were offered in seven different departments on a sales area of over 7,000 m² on five floors.

In June 2022 the store celebrated its 25th anniversary as "Germany's largest media department store" with a major customer campaign. Its turnover in 2021 amounted to 30 million euros (2020: 25 million euros). Regular events include readings, book signings and concerts.

== Building ==
The building complex was developed and built by the architects Miroslav Volf (Saarbrücken), and Mario Campi and Franco Pessina (both Lugano). It was designed in modern style but with references to the historical tradition of street-level development, using modern building materials and arcades.

The office building has eight floors, of which the five lower floors are used for sales, while the upper floors serve as the headquarters of the German Dussmann Group. Other tenants include Vodafone, two restaurateurs, a coffeehouse operator and, since 2008, Care Germany.

The two lower shop areas are designed with a central aisle that is open to the sky via a pyramid-shaped glass roof. The media department store houses around 10.5 million products and over 800,000 cultural media such as books, audio recordings, film, sheet music and design. The English & International Bookshop offer international literature, and in the KulturManufaktur customers can produce their own records and printed matter.

An original sphinx of Hatshepsut (1475 BC), a permanent loan from the Egyptian Museum of Berlin, sits in the entrance area of the building. The wall next to the escalators features a vertical garden, designed in 2012 by the French botanist Patrick Blanc. The green and irrigated tropical landscape of 270 square meters consists of over 6,600 plants and is called the Mur Végétal (vegetable wall) by the artist. The light artwork Lunatique neoonly No. 8. (1999) by the French artist François Morellet is installed on a side wall.
