= Bikeygees =

Non-profit

- Bikeygees e. V.
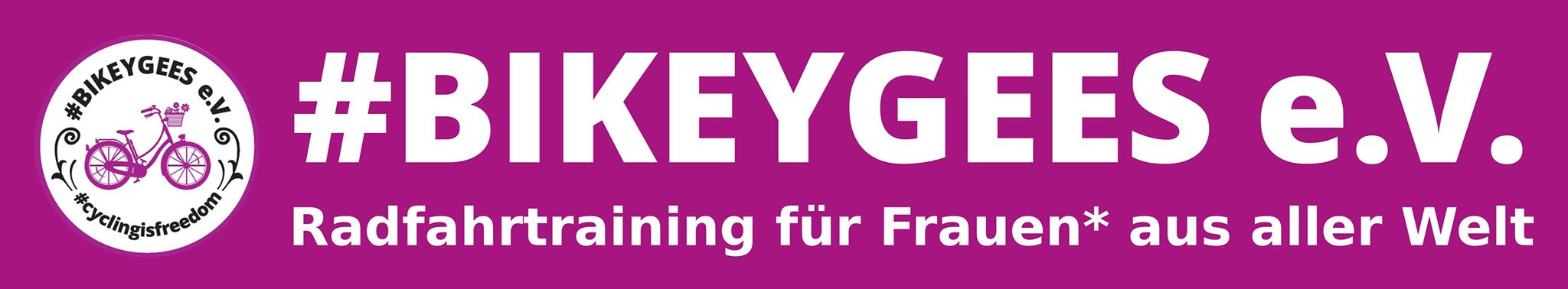
- Established: October 21, 2016; 9 years ago
- Founders: Annette Krüger, Anne Seebach
- Founded at: Berlin
- Legal status: Non-profit registered association
- Purpose: intercultural project which teaches women with refugee or migrant background how to ride the bicycle
- Location: Berlin, Germany

Bikeygees e. V. (stylized spelling: #BIKEYGEES e.V.) is an intercultural project in Berlin (Germany) dedicated to women with a migrant or refugee background. In trainings organized by Bikeygees, volunteers teach the women how to ride a bicycle. The goal of the organization is to promote empowerment by helping women to become more mobile.

== History ==
In September 2015, event managers Annette Krüger and Anne Seebach began to teach women in an emergency refugee accommodation in Berlin how to cycle. The initiative was met with great enthusiasm. Following this, Krüger and Seebach founded Bikeygees e.V. in 2016 and registered it as a nonprofit organization working for education and integration. The name is a portmanteau of the English words ″bike″ and ″refugees″. Originally, the organization labelled itself as a ″small empowerment project″. Annette Krüger continues to act as project manager of the organization.

Women and teenage girls with and without a refugee background can participate in free cycling trainings, in which practical support for riding a bicycle as well as theoretical lessons on traffic rules are offered in several languages. Additionally, women learn the basics of bicycle repairs in order to be able to maintain their own bicycles.

In the beginning, the trainings took place exclusively at the grounds of the youth traffic school at Wassertorplatz in Berlin-Kreuzberg. With funding from the German television lottery (Deutsche Fernsehlotterie), additional trainings were carried out from 2019 to 2020 in the peripheral districts of Marzahn and Hohenschönhausen, along with beginner bicycle tours to the surroundings as networking opportunities. The organization has been active in Lichtenrade since July 2019. In 2021, cycling trainings were offered regularly at 15 locations throughout Berlin and Brandenburg.

The Berlin NGO has gained not only regional but also global attention. There have been reports in English-language and Italian media, and even on Indian television. In March 2023, the British Queen Camilla met representatives of the organization in Café Refugio in the district of Neukölln, in which the organization has its office space. Beyond the media recognition, the project has been imitated abroad: the Swiss initiative Friends on Bikes in Zürich has explicitly named Bikeyges as the model for its work.

By the summer of 2023, the organization estimates that it has carried out more than 1000 trainings, has taught more than 1700 women and girls how to cycle, and has given out more than 600 sets of bicycles, helmets, and locks.

== Organization Goal and Background ==
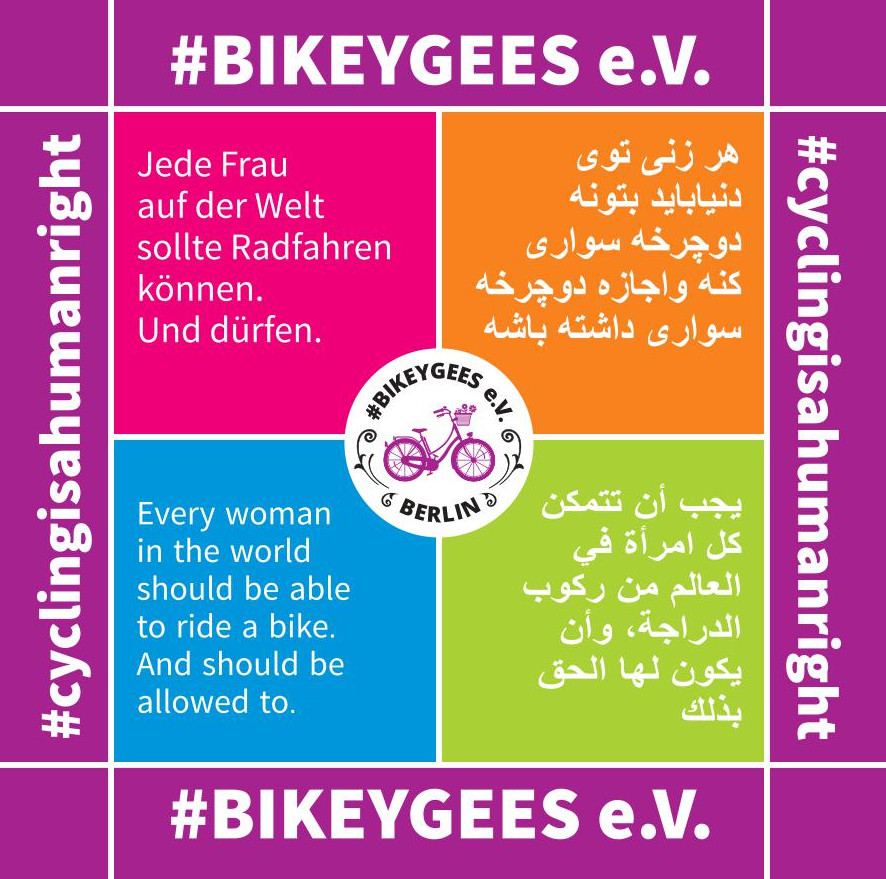
Campaign Sticker Cycling is a human right

Volunteers teach cycling skills to women and girls to support them in becoming more mobile, as a prerequisite for the participation in societal and cultural life in Germany. Women's lack of mobility can be for cultural or religious reasons. It may be forbidden or frowned upon for women to cycle in certain countries of origin, such as in Iran, Afghanistan, and Saudi Arabia (until 2013).

Another important aspect of the cycling training is the theoretical traffic lessons. Through the support of former participants from various countries, these are offered in multiple languages (German, English, Arabic, Persian). Learning materials from the organization are also published in multiple languages and easily accessible. Through use of the available resources and lessons, participants should be able to safely navigate and orient themselves in street traffic.

When possible, the participants are equipped with their own bicycles, as well as safety vests and helmets. Bicycles and helmets are donated or purchased using donated funds. In the case of donated bicycles, they are brought up to standard by volunteer mechanics.

Beyond this, former participants function as multipliers for the organization: they give independent trainings and transfer their knowledge directly to new learners.

== Structure and Finances ==
The organization is a registered non-profit and is financed through donations and public funds, such as from the German Federal Ministry of the Interior. It has a board consisting of a first and second chair as well as a treasurer. Volunteer trainers support the project manager Annette Krüger during the trainings. Bikeygees e.V. is a member of the German Parity Welfare Association (Deutscher Paritätischer Wohlfahrtsverband).

== Awards and honors ==
- 2017: Winner of the Active Competition (Aktiv-Wettbewerb), given by the Bündnis für Demokratie und Toleranz for imitable civil society projects
- 2017: Hatun Sürücü Prize from the Berlin Green Party (Grüne-Fraktion Berlin) for commitment to women and girls
- 2018: ″Respekt Gewinnt!″ Prize (Respect Wins!) from the Berliner Ratschlag für Demokratie (Berlin Council for Democracy)
- 2018: German Cycling Prize, category Service
- 2023: Rainbow Award from the Regenbogenfonds e. V. Berlin
