= Path of Visionaries =

Coordinates: 52°30′01″N 13°23′30″E

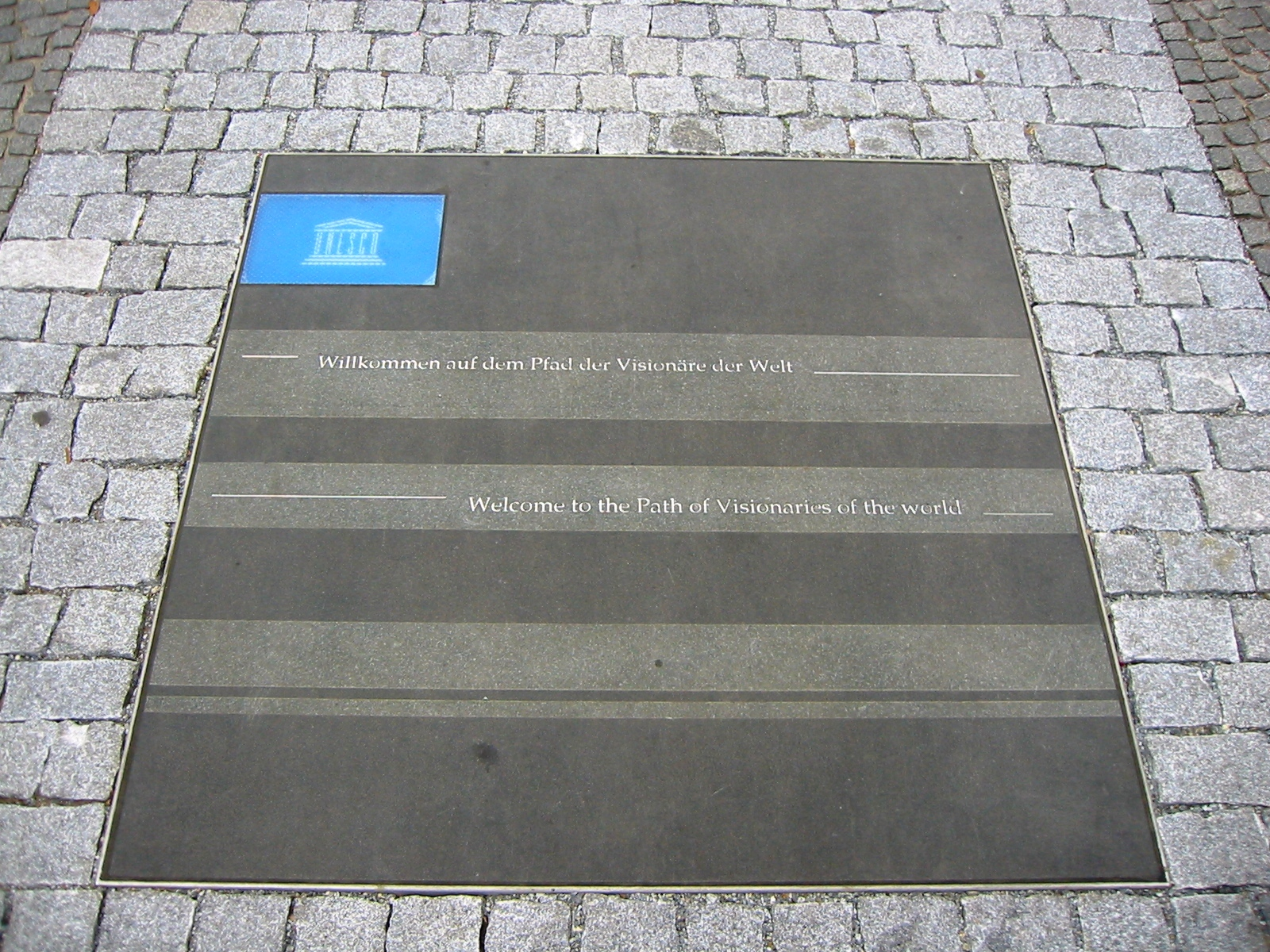
Under the patronage of the UNESCO national plaques are embedded the sidewalk

The Path of Visionaries (German: Pfad der Visionäre) is a city art project under construction in Berlin, Germany. Located on the southern end of Friedrichstraße in Kreuzberg plaques are embedded in the sidewalks.

== History ==
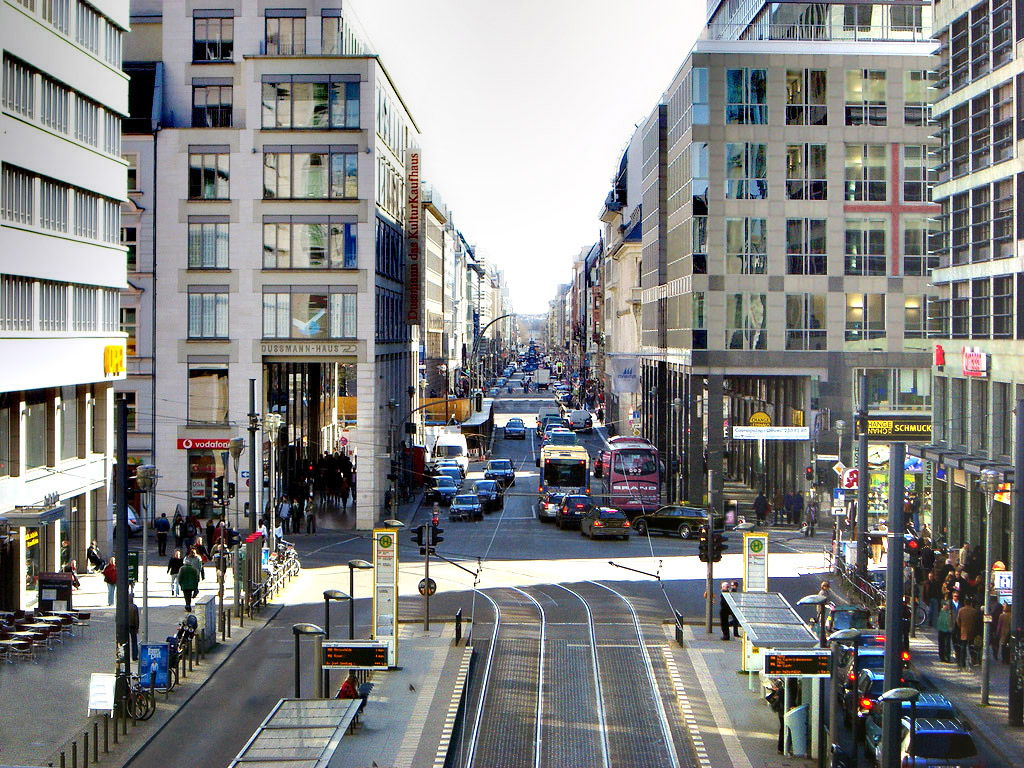
View towards Friedrichstraße

On May 7, 2006, political representatives of the EU Member States inaugurated the Path of Visionaries in the pedestrian zone of the Berlin- Friedrichstrasse. Floor plaques designated to every single EU Member State are to be installed in a pedestrian zone.

== See also ==
- UNESCO
- Berlin
- Art
