= Hallesches Tor =

Coordinates: 52°29′52″N 13°23′28″E

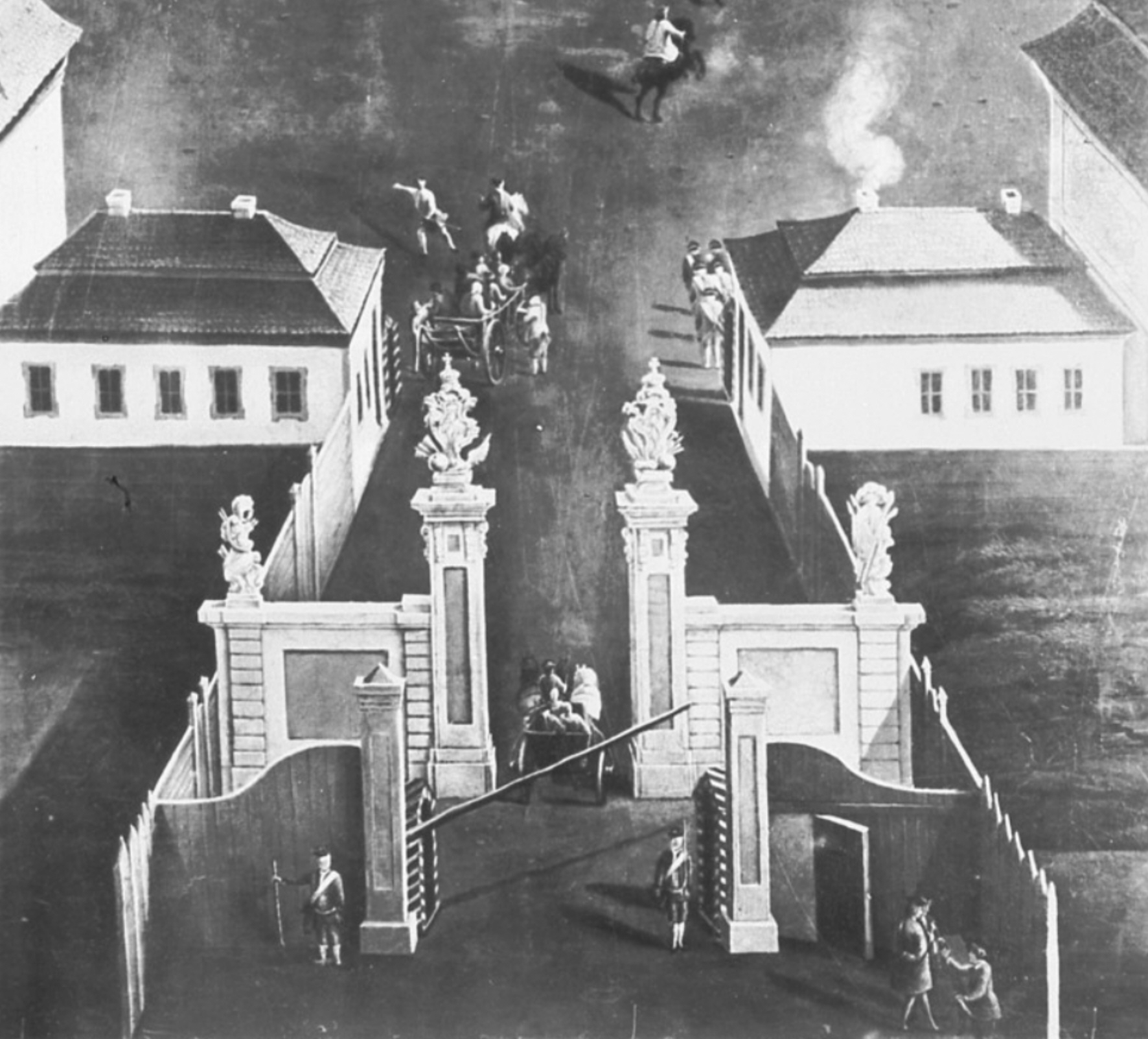
Hallesches Tor, detail from an idealised image of Friedrichstadt by an unknown artist (panel painting, around 1730)

The Hallesches Tor was located in today's Berlin district Kreuzberg south of Mehringplatz. Today, as a historic monument listed underground station on the site of the former gate bears the name Hallesches Tor. It is a major transfer point for the underground lines U1/U3 (here as Hochbahn) and U6 as well as the bus lines 248 (Berlin Ostbahnhof - Breitenbachplatz via Südkreuz) and M41 (Hauptbahnhof via Potsdamer Platz - Baumschulenstraße). The station is connected by the Hallesche-Tor-Brücke with the Blücherplatz to the south. The Amerika-Gedenkbibliothek and the nearby Jewish Museum contribute to the heavy visitor traffic in the area around the Hallesches Tor.

== History ==
Map of the area in front of the Hallesches Tor (around 1780)

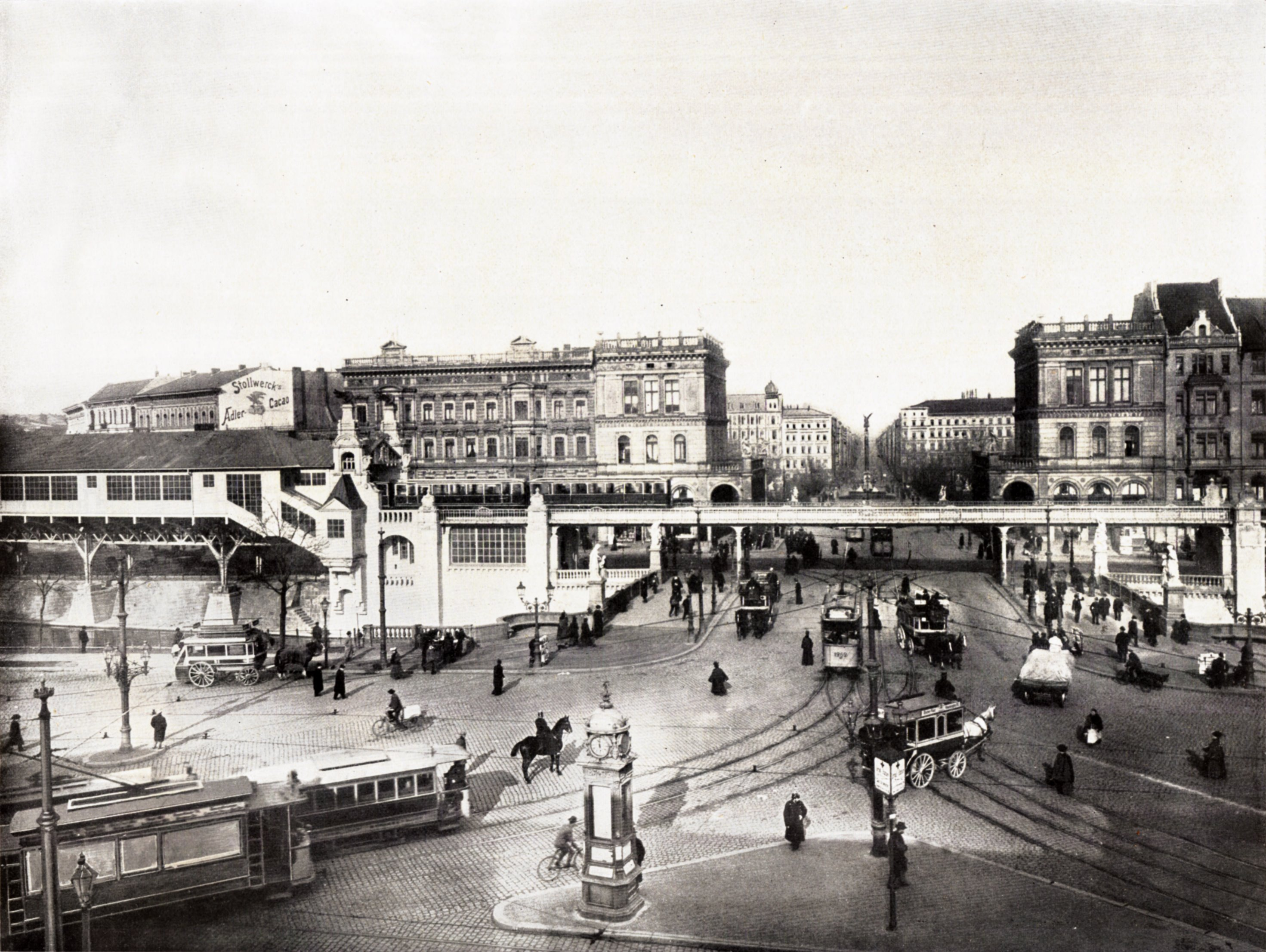
Hallesches Tor after 1902. View over the Landwehrkanal to the newly opened station of the Hochbahn.

It is named after the historic and no longer existing Hallesche Tor of the Berlin Customs Wall, which replaced the Berlin city wall in the 18th century. The gate was located in the south of Berlin between the Wassertor and the Potsdamer Tor and formed the exit gate to the Prussian Halle an der Saale. Until the Jewish Edict of 1812, the gate was the only one in southern Berlin that Jews were allowed to pass, and they had to register. In the north they were only allowed to enter the city through the Rosenthaler Tor, and from 1750 through the Prenzlauer Tor.

Since the beginning of the 18th century, several cemeteries have been built outside the former city in front of the Hallesches Tor. The area was named Am Halleschen Thore around 1848. In the years 1876 to 1879, Heinrich Strack erected arcaded residential and commercial buildings and the Belle-Alliance-Brücke as a representative entrance to the city centre of Berlin instead of the gate. The complex was decorated with four groups of figures depicting trade and traffic. After severe war damage and post-war demolition, the bridge was restored in the 1950s and 1980s and two groups of figures were reassembled.
