= Berlin Peace Column =

Column in Berlin

- de: Friedenssäule
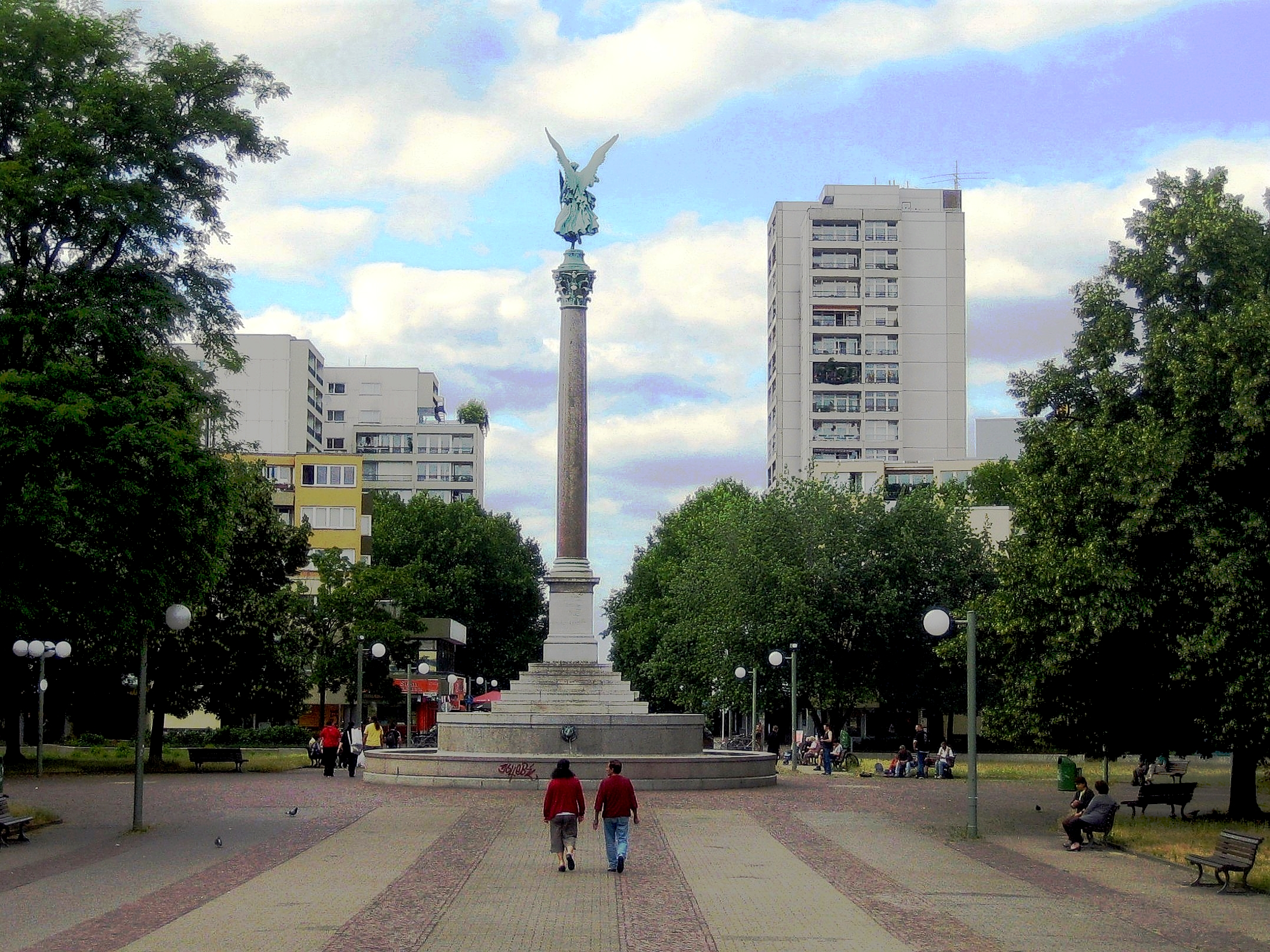
- The column in Mehringplatz, 2006
- Artist: Christian Gottlieb Cantian
- Year: 1843
- Subject: Victoria
- Dimensions: 1900 cm (750 in)
- Location: Berlin, Germany
- 52°29′56″N 13°23′30″E

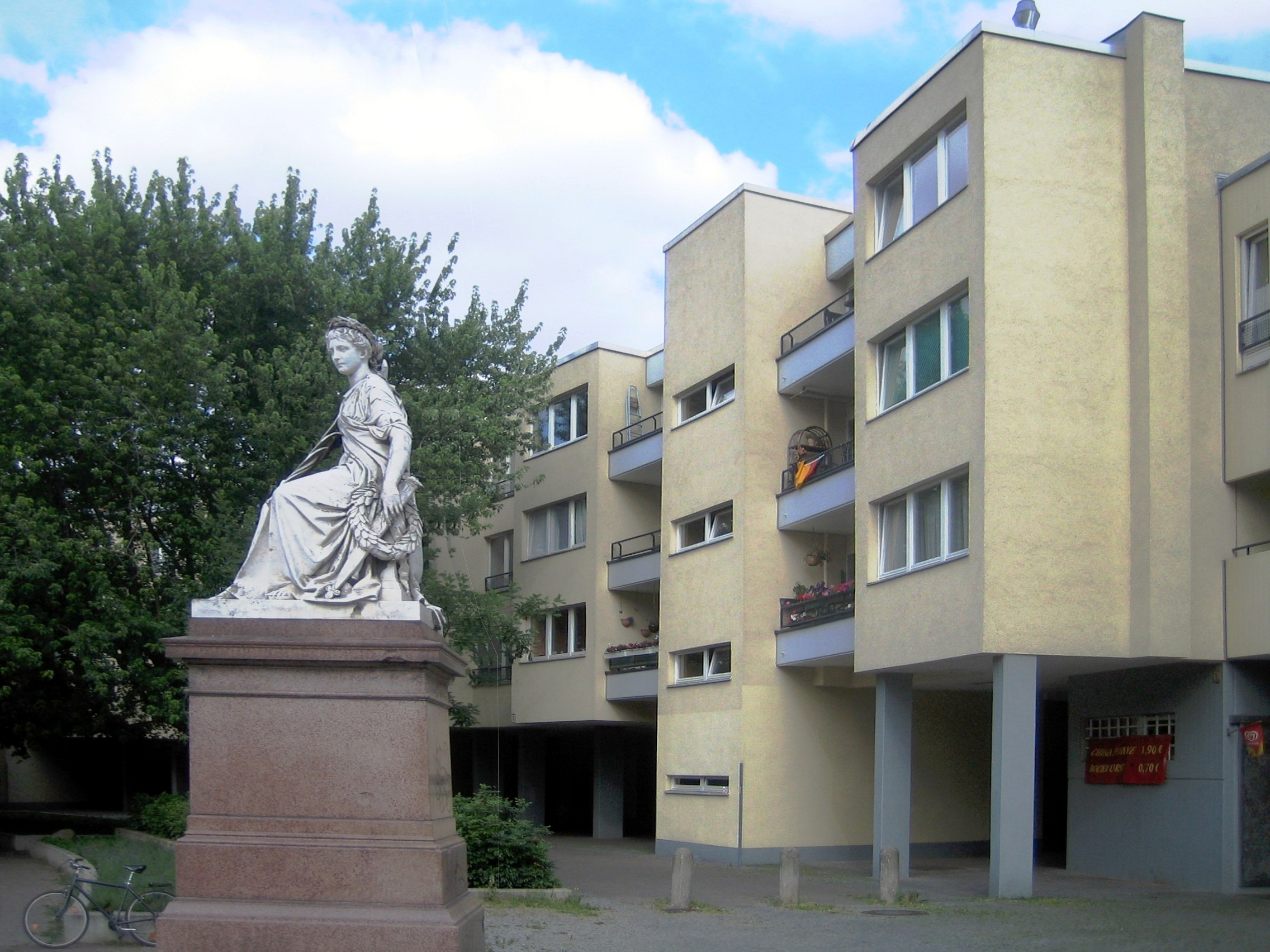
The Peace, 1879 by Albert Wolff

The Peace Column (German: Friedenssäule) is a column located in Mehringplatz in Berlin, Germany. Designed by Christian Gottlieb Cantian and erected in 1843, the 19-meter column is topped with a brass statue of Victoria, goddess of victory, designed by Christian Daniel Rauch. In 1876, allegories of the four victorious allies of Waterloo (or Belle Alliance in Prussian historiography) were added, and in 1879 two more sculptures followed: The Peace by Albert Wolff and Clio, writing the history of the Wars of Liberation (Befreiungskriege) by Ferdinand Hartzer.

== See also ==
- 1843 in art
