= Prinzenstraße station =

Station of the Berlin U-Bahn

Prinzenstraße
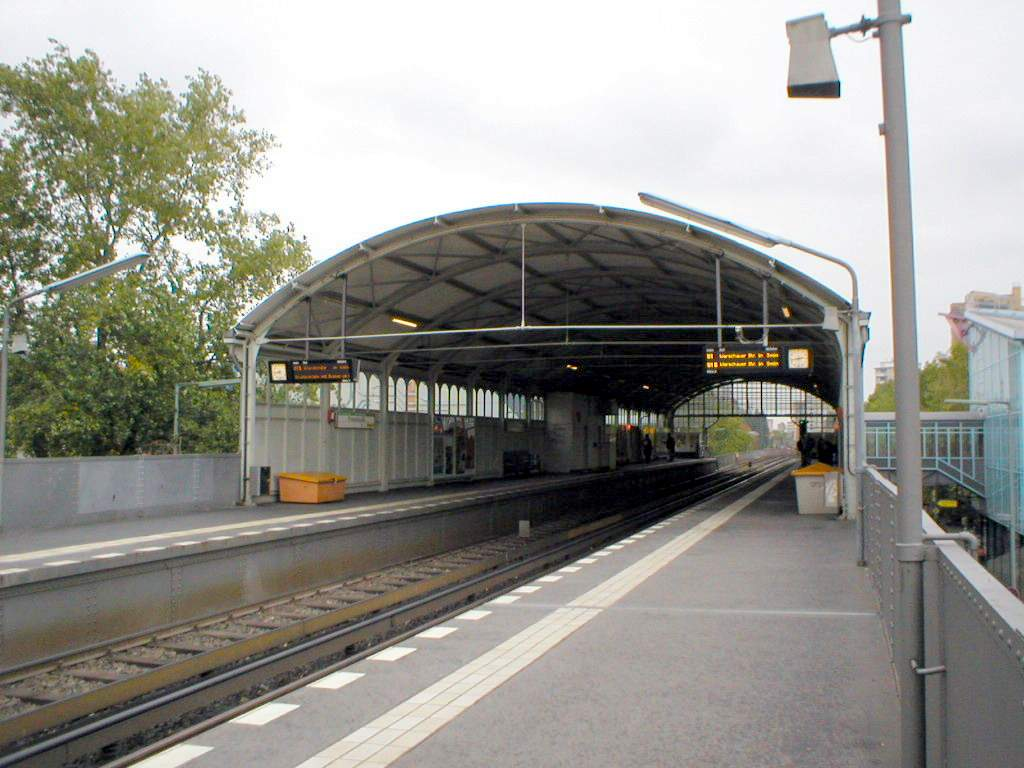

General information
- Location: Gitschiner Straße/Prinzenstraße; Kreuzberg, Berlin; Germany
- Coordinates: 52°29′54″N 13°24′22″E
- Owner: Berliner Verkehrsbetriebe
- Operator: Berliner Verkehrsbetriebe
- Platforms: 2 side platforms
- Tracks: 2
- Connections: : 140, N1

Construction
- Structure type: Elevated
- Cycle facilities: Yes
- Accessible: Yes (eastbound only)

Other information
- Fare zone: : Berlin A/5555

History
- Opened: 18 February 1902; 124 years ago

Services
Preceding station	Berlin U-Bahn	Following station
Hallesches Tor towards Uhlandstraße	U1	Kottbusser Tor towards Warschauer Straße
Hallesches Tor towards Krumme Lanke	U3	Kottbusser Tor towards Warschauer Straße
Route map
Location
- Location within Berlin

Prinzenstraße is a Berlin U-Bahn station on lines U1 and U3.

== Overview ==
The station is located roughly where the eponymous street crosses the Landwehrkanal in Kreuzberg. The nearby Böcklerpark, a small park with a hall where music events are often held, and the Sommerbad Kreuzberg swimming pool, colloquially called Prinzenbad, are among the most popular venues in central Kreuzberg. The street and subsequently the station were named after Prince William I, the later German Emperor.

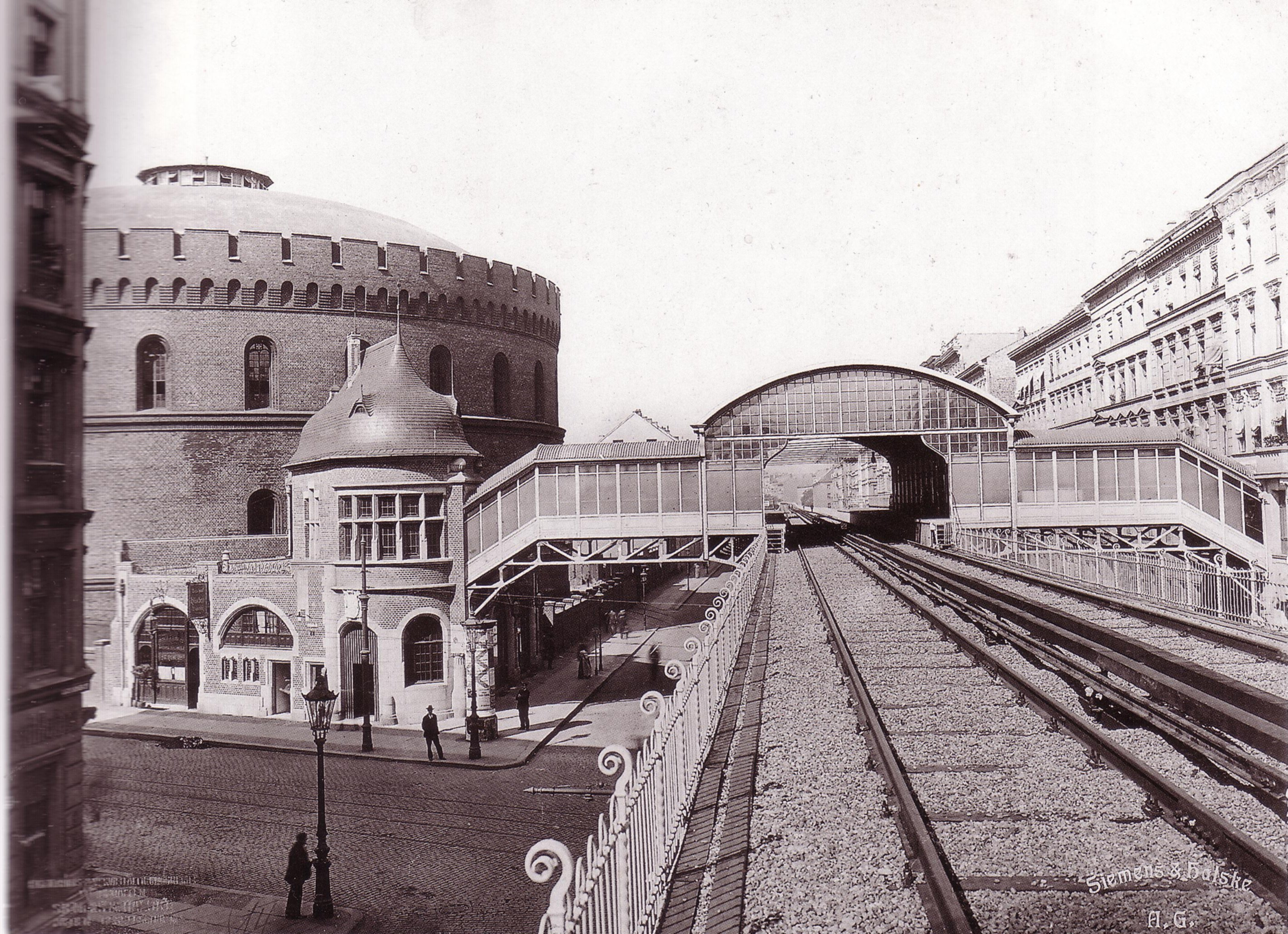
U-Bahn station Prinzenstraße, about 1900

The station on the first U-Bahn line from Potsdamer Platz to Stralauer Tor was opened on 18 February 1902. Because the station is on a viaduct above the junction of Prinzenstraße and Gitschiner Straße, a street level entrance hall could only be erected on its south side on the grounds of a gas plant, while the stairs to the northern platform had to be included in the opposite residential building.

Destroyed in World War II on 28/29 January 1944 and 3 February 1945, the station was rebuilt in the 1950s. It later received new entrance halls in a hotly disputed Postmodern style, in 1984 for the north wing and 1991 for the south wing. Inside, a preserved detail of the old station is found at the northern platform, a small sculpture of a frog with a crown and a ball, alluding to the Frog Prince fairy tale.
