= Friedrichstraße =

Street in Berlin, Germany

- Friedrichstrasse
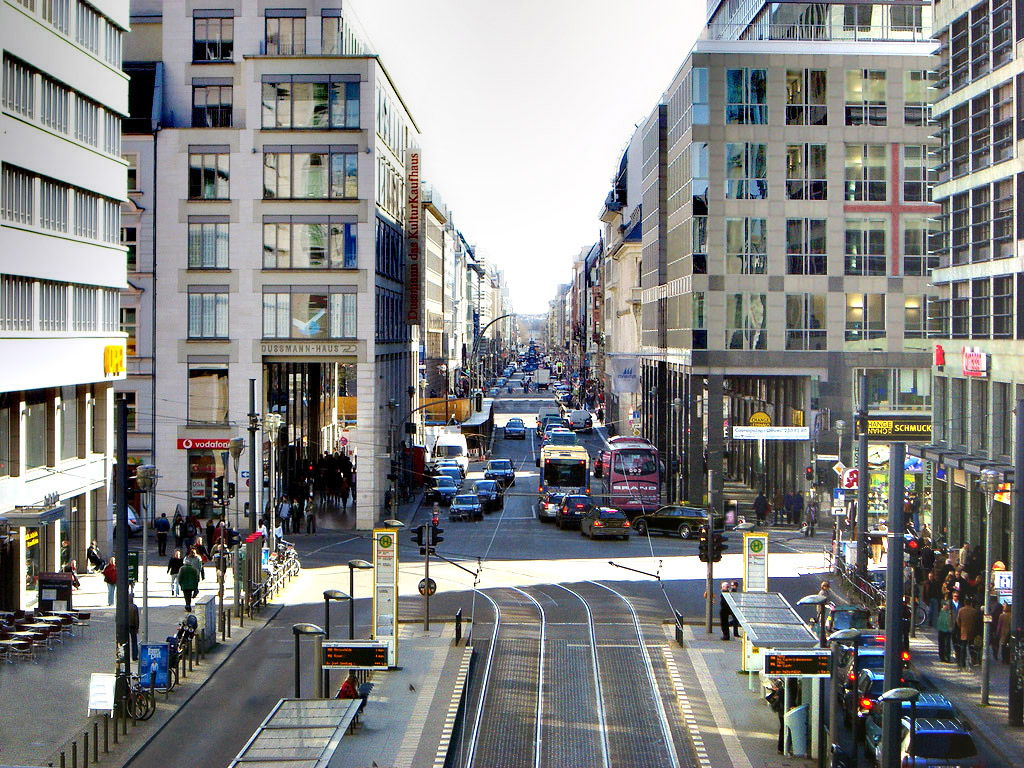
- View north towards Friedrichstraße station
- Interactive map of Friedrichstraße
- Former names: North of the Spree: Der Damm; (1688–c. 1700); Dammstraße; (c. 1700–1786); Near the Spree: An der Potsdamer Brücke; (c. 1688–c. 1705); South of the Spree: Querstraße; (c. 1700–c. 1705)
- Namesake: Frederick III, Elector of Brandenburg
- Type: Shopping street
- Length: 3,300 m (10,800 ft)
- Location: Berlin, Germany
- Quarter: Mitte, Kreuzberg
- Nearest metro station: Oranienburger Tor; Friedrichstraße; Unter den Linden; Stadtmitte; Kochstraße; Hallesches Tor
- Coordinates: 52°31′00″N 13°23′21″E
- North end: Chausseestraße; Hannoversche Straße; Torstraße
- Major junctions: Oranienburger Straße; Schiffbauerdamm; Dorotheenstraße; Unter den Linden; Behrenstraße; Französische Straße; Jägerstraße; Mohrenstraße; Leipziger Straße; Checkpoint Charlie; Kochstraße
- South end: Mehringplatz

Construction
- Inauguration: Generally: 1688; Current name: c. 1705

Friedrichstraße, or Friedrichstrasse (see ß; German pronunciation: [ˈfʁiːdʁɪçˌʃtʁaːsə]) (lit. Frederick Street), is a major culture and shopping street in central Berlin, forming the core of the Friedrichstadt neighborhood and giving the name to Berlin Friedrichstraße station. It runs from the northern part of the old Mitte district (north of which it is called Chausseestraße) to the Hallesches Tor in the district of Kreuzberg.

This downtown area is known for its expensive real estate market and the campus of the Hertie School of Governance. Due to its north-southerly direction, it forms important junctions with the east-western axes, most notably with Leipziger Straße and Unter den Linden. The U6 U-Bahn line runs underneath. During the Cold War it was bisected by the Berlin Wall and was the location of Checkpoint Charlie.

== Overview ==
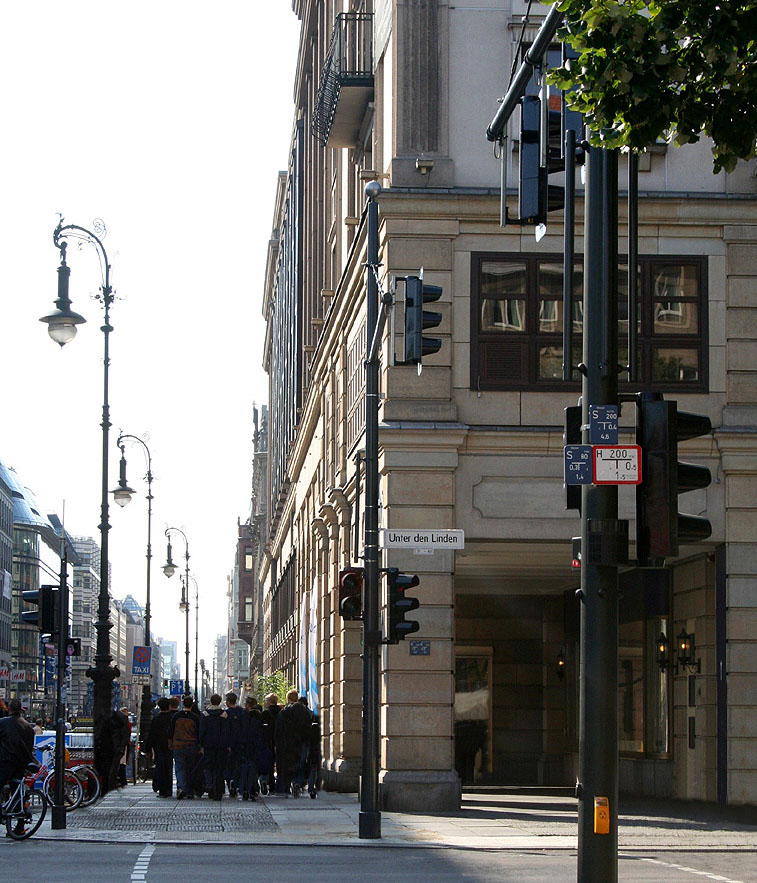
View into Friedrichstraße from Unter den Linden

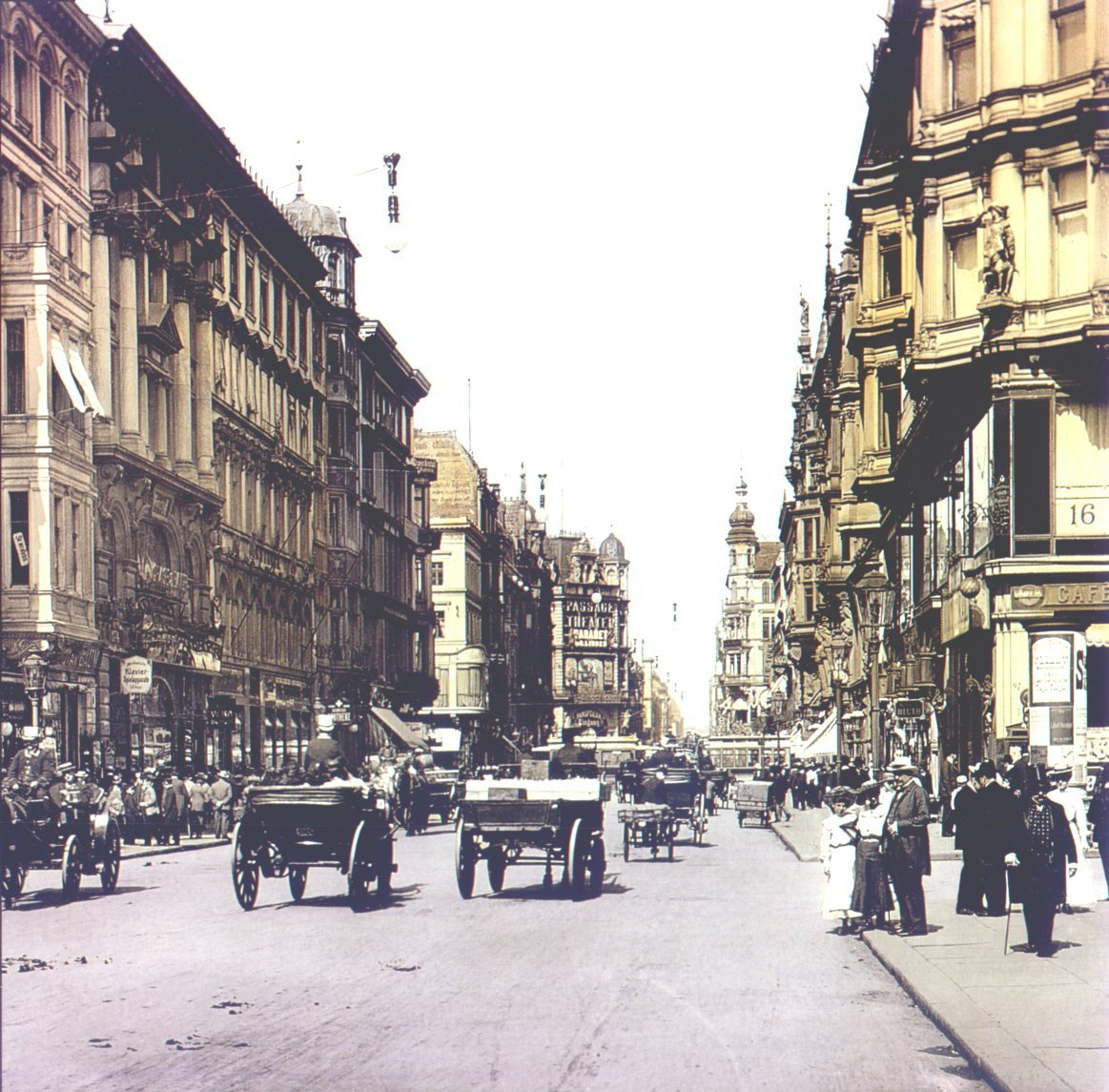
Friedrichstraße, around 1900, look to the north

As central Berlin's traditional shopping street, Friedrichstraße is three blocks east of the parallel Wilhelmstraße, the historic heart of the old government quarter (German: Regierungsviertel) until 1945. Over the Weidendammer Bridge Friedrichstraße crosses the Spree to the north. 1865 to 1867 was built Friedrichstadt-Palast at Friedrichstraße. In 1910, Admiralspalast opened at Friedrichstraße as theatre.

Friedrichstraße was badly damaged during World War II and only partly rebuilt during the division of Berlin. The section in West Berlin was partly rebuilt as a residential street; in the late 1960s, the remains of the former Belle-Alliance-Platz at the end of the Friedrichstraße, renamed Mehringplatz, were completely demolished and replaced with a concrete housing and office development designed by Hans Scharoun. Despite its central location, this area remains relatively poor.

In the East Berlin section, plans were put into place to widen the street to four lanes as was done to the Leipziger Straße; the Hotel Unter den Linden (demolished 2006) and the original Lindencorso (demolished 1991) were the only structures built during this time with the wider profile of the street in mind. The Grand Hotel Berlin, East Germany's top 5-star hotel, was built across from the Hotel Unter den Linden in 1987. Further plans were drawn up for a rebuilding of the street, and construction was well underway at the time of German reunification in 1990, when the East German Plattenbau-based construction was stopped and subsequently demolished; only a few buildings that were already complete and occupied were spared. The completed Berlin Casino building located at the corner of Leipziger Straße was torn down in 1994.

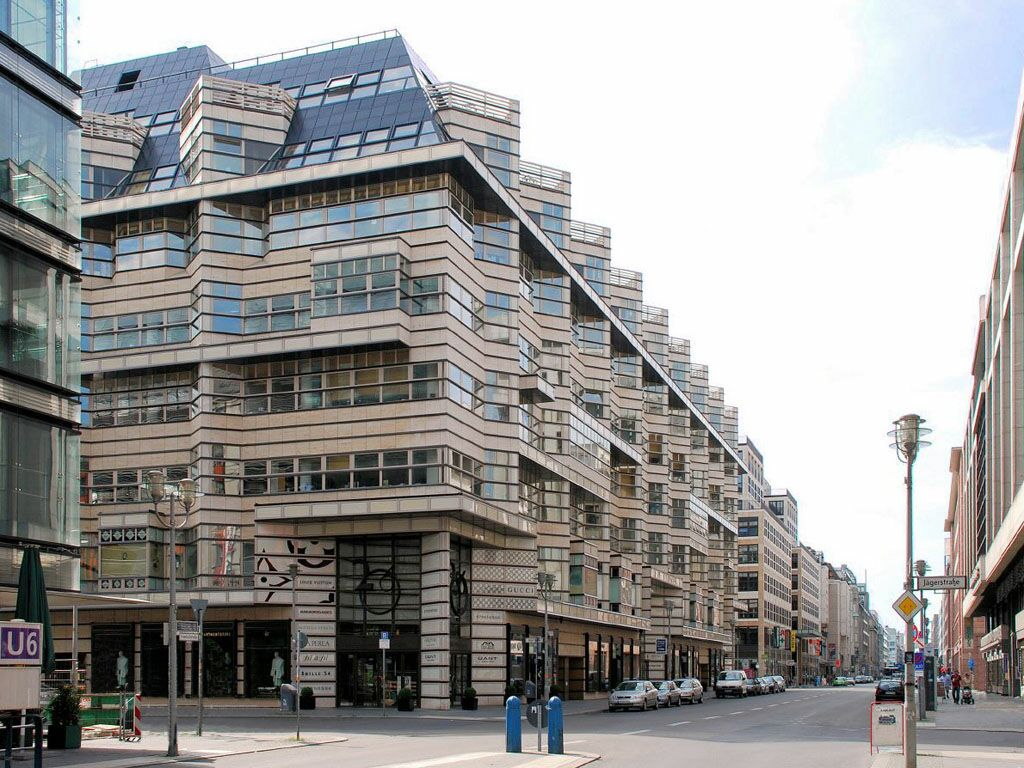
The new Quartier 206

Friedrichstraße was rebuilt in the 1990s, and at the time it was the city's largest construction project; work continues north of Friedrichstraße station. From 1992 until 1996, construction works took place for a six-building, $800 million, multi-use complex developed by Tishman Speyer, among others. The buildings have a city-imposed height limit of about 100 feet. A number of well-known architects contributed to the plans, including Jean Nouvel, who designed the Galeries Lafayette department store (Quartier 207); Pei Cobb Freed & Partners, who planned Quartier 206; and Oswald Mathias Ungers, who created Quartier 205. Philip Johnson created parts of the American Business Center at Checkpoint Charlie, a $751 million five-building complex of offices, shops and apartments developed by Ronald Lauder and Central European Media Enterprises. The redevelopment received mixed reviews.

During the Cold War and division of Berlin, the Friedrichstraße underground station, despite being located in East Berlin, was utilized by two intersecting West Berlin S-Bahn lines and the West Berlin subway line U6. The station served as a transfer point for these lines, and trains stopped there, although all other stations on these lines in East Berlin were sealed-off ghost stations (Geisterbahnhof), where trains passed through under guard without stopping. At Friedrichstraße station, West Berlin passengers could transfer from one platform to another but could not leave the station without the appropriate papers. The section of the station open to West Berlin lines was heavily guarded and was sealed off from the smaller part of it serving as a terminus of the East Berlin S-Bahn and as a station for long-distance trains.

In 2020, a section of Friedrichstraße was closed off for motorized traffic during a five-month trial period with the intent to revitalize urban space.

== In popular culture ==
- The Swiss author Robert Walser wrote a 1908 prose piece about Friedrichstraße, titled "Friedrichstrasse" in English translation, which is included in the 2012 collection Berlin Stories.
