= Hallesches Tor station =

Station of the Berlin U-Bahn

Hallesches Tor
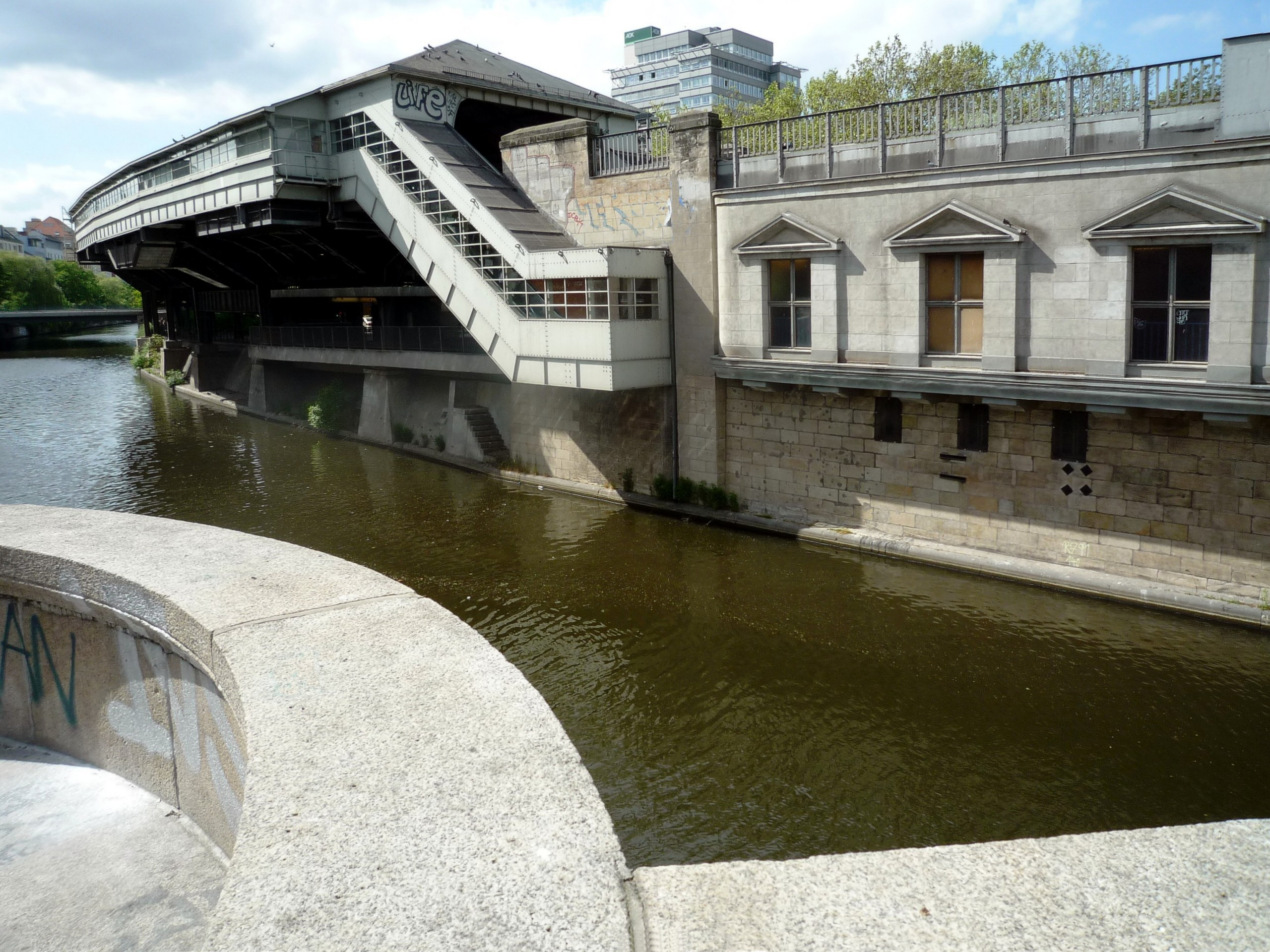
- View of the station from Hallesches-Tor-Brücke

General information
- Location: Hallesches Ufer/Hallesches-Tor-Brücke; Kreuzberg, Berlin; Germany
- Coordinates: 52°29′52″N 13°23′28″E
- Owner: Berliner Verkehrsbetriebe
- Operator: Berliner Verkehrsbetriebe
- Platforms: 2 side platforms (U1/U3); 1 island platform (U6)
- Tracks: 4
- Connections: : 248, N1, N42; : M41

Construction
- Structure type: Elevated (U1/U3); Underground (U6)
- Cycle facilities: Yes
- Accessible: Yes

Other information
- Fare zone: : Berlin A/5555

History
- Opened: 18 February 1902; 124 years ago (U1/3 level); 30 January 1923; 103 years ago (U6 level)

Services
| Preceding station | Berlin U-Bahn | Following station |
|---|---|---|
| Möckernbrücke towards Uhlandstraße | U1 | Prinzenstraße towards Warschauer Straße |
| Möckernbrücke towards Krumme Lanke | U3 | Prinzenstraße towards Warschauer Straße |
| Kochstraße towards Alt-Tegel | U6 | Mehringdamm towards Alt-Mariendorf |
Route map
U1/U3 station
U6 station
Location
- Location within Berlin

Hallesches Tor is a Berlin U-Bahn station in the central Kreuzberg quarter, served by lines U1, U3, and U6. It is named after the historic Hallesches Tor (Halle Gate) of the Berlin Customs Wall, erected in the 18th century.

== Overview ==
The historic gate of the Customs Wall, laid out from 1737 onwards to replace the medieval city fortifications, marked the southern tip of the Friedrichstadt neighbourhood. It was located at the southern end of Friedrichstraße and the Rondell (renamed Belle-Alliance-Platz in 1815 and Mehringplatz in 1946). Neighbouring gates were on Potsdamer Platz in the west and on Wassertorplatz (Water Gate) in the east, where the present course of the U1 viaduct roughly corresponds to the former city wall. South of the gate, a wooden bridge led across the Landwehr Canal; from here the road ran via Tempelhof to the city of Halle, part of Brandenburg-Prussia since 1680. The present-day stone bridge was built between 1874 and 1876.

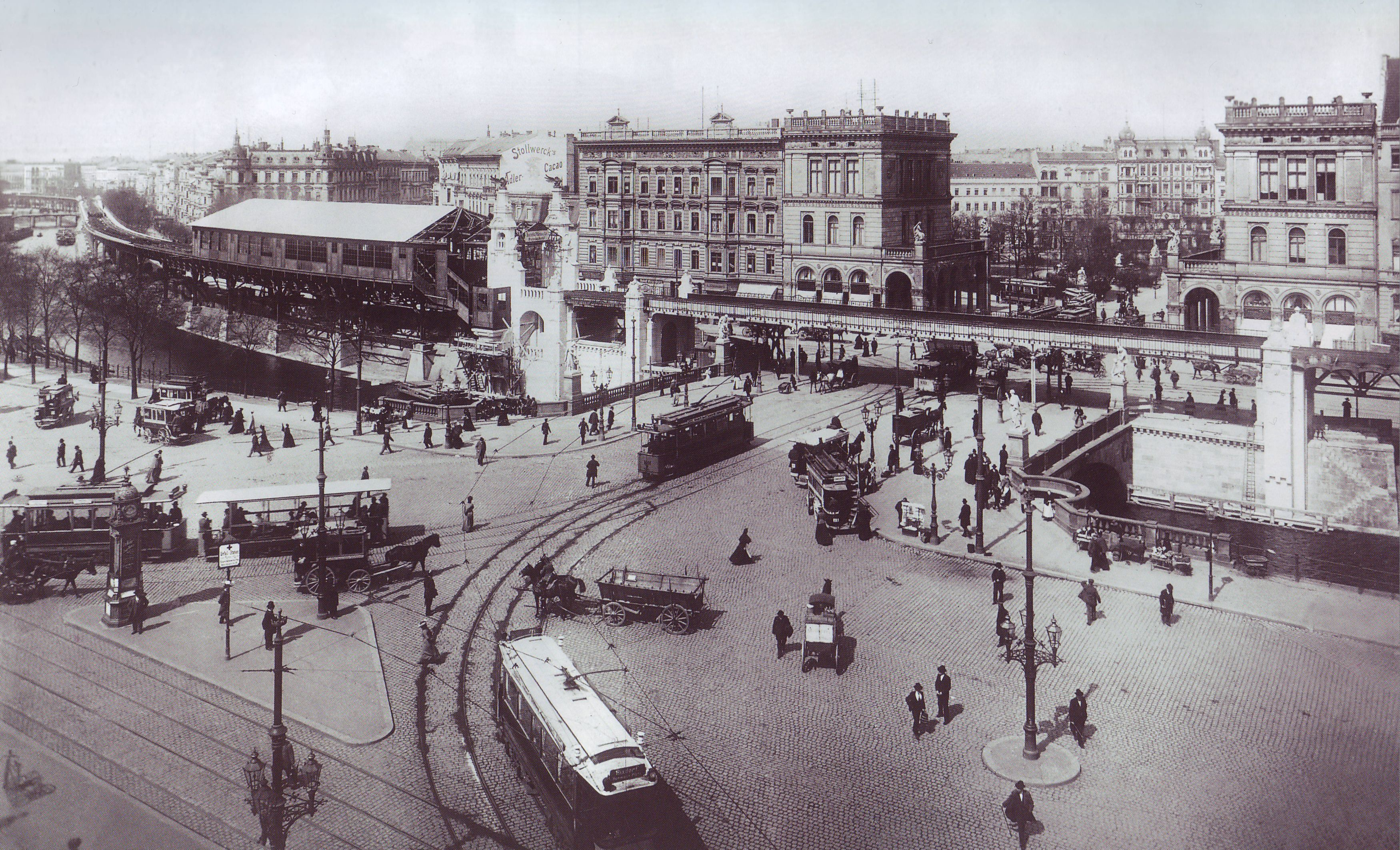
Construction, 1901

The U1 and U3 platforms, on an elevated railway at the northern banks of the Landwehr Canal, opened on 18 February 1902 with Berlin's first U-Bahn line (Stammstrecke) from Stralauer Tor to Potsdamer Platz. The underground U6 (then Linie C) platform was finished on 30 January 1923, linked by a pedestrian tunnel. Even today, changing from one platform to the other is (for Berlin) quite a long distance.

The station was severely damaged by the bombing of Berlin in World War II; both parts of the station had to be shut down due to numerous bombing hits and electricity shortage in April 1945. U-Bahn service at the underground platform already resumed on 4 July 1945; a provisional upper platform opened in October. The viaduct was rebuilt by 1949, and the lower platform was elongated and refurbished in 1976.

The Amerika-Gedenkbibliothek on Blücherplatz and the Jewish Museum Berlin with its 1999 extension designed by Daniel Libeskind are nearby.

== Gallery ==
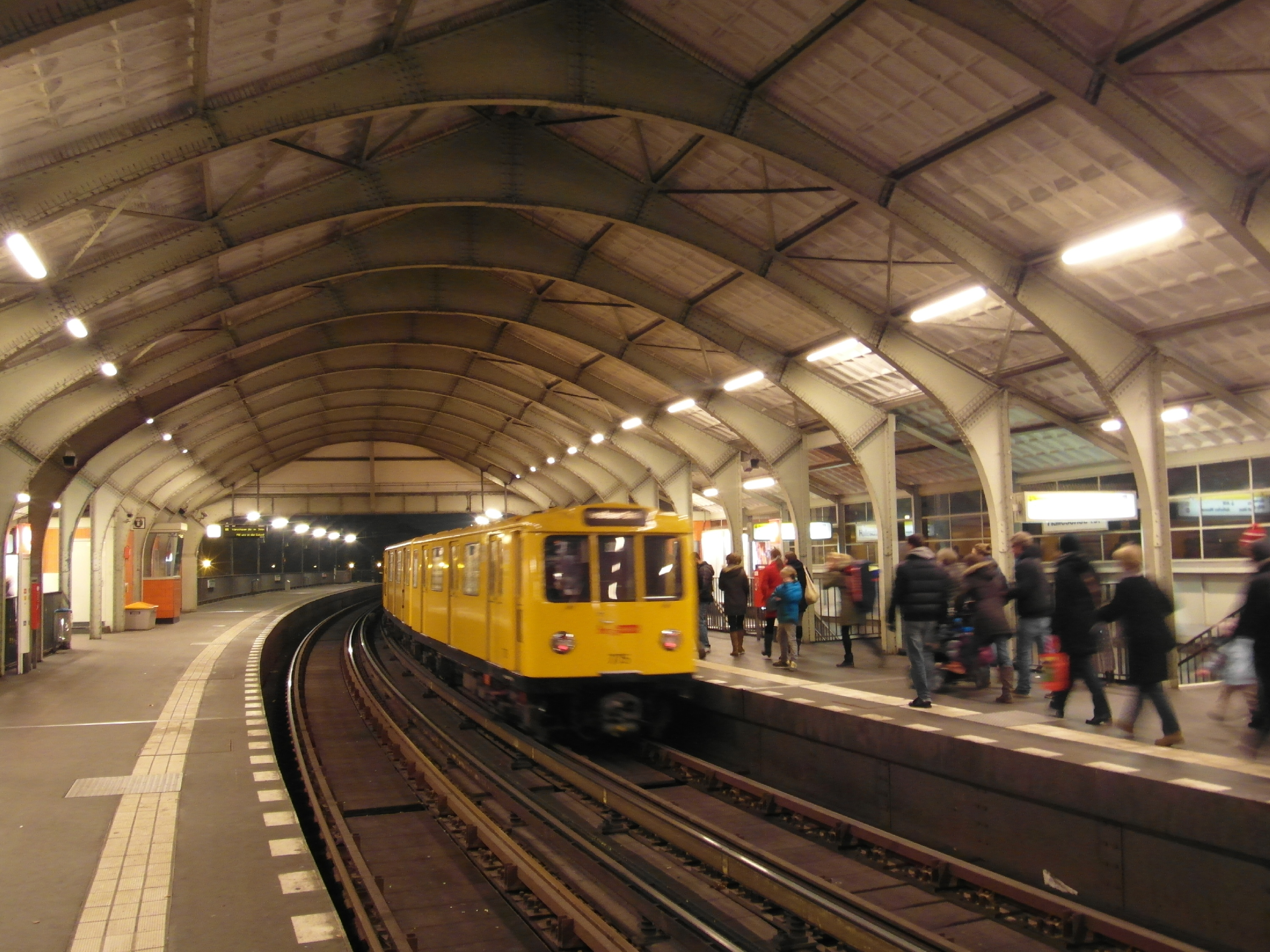
U1/U3 platforms

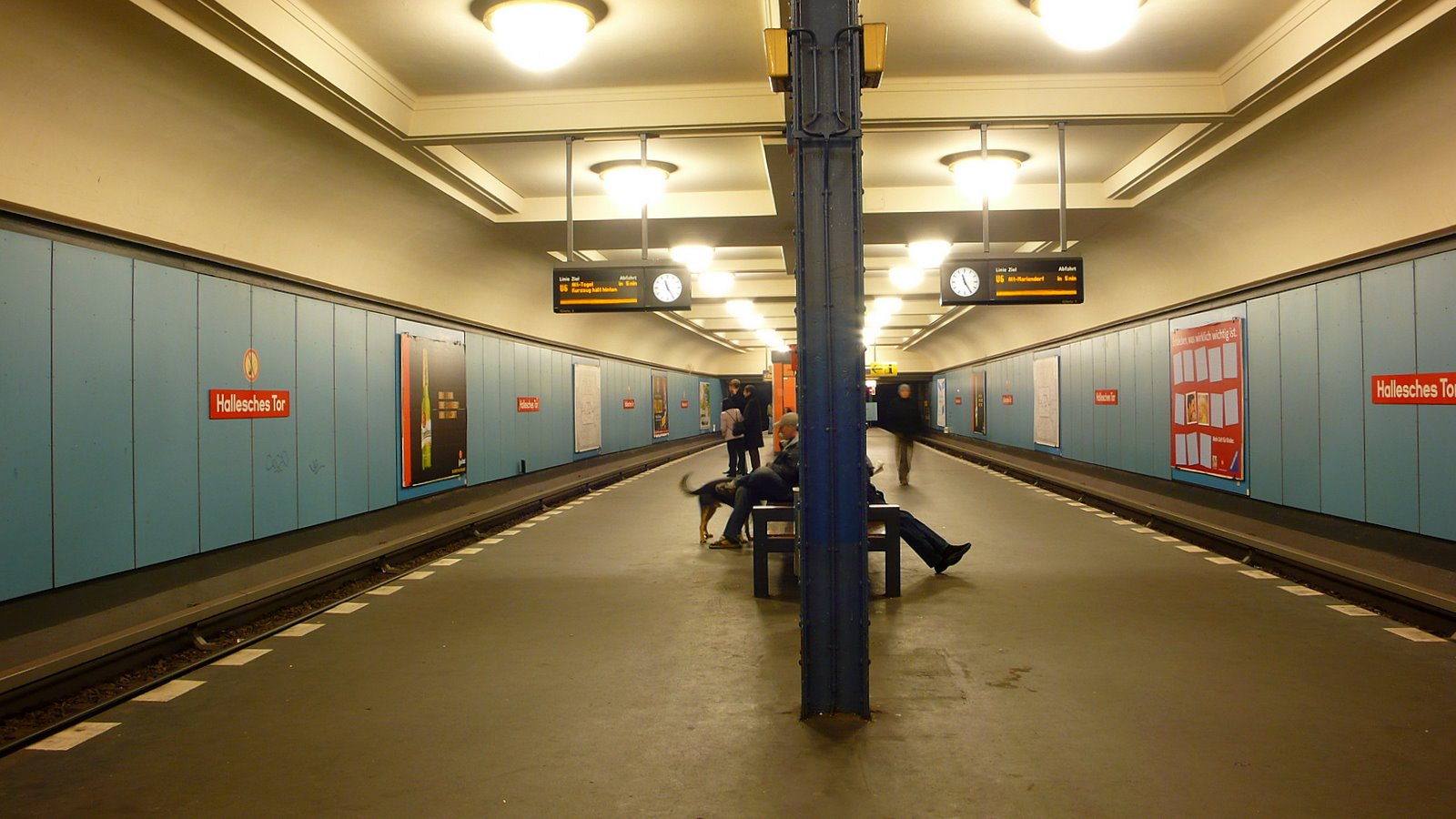
U6 platform
