= Mehringplatz =

Square in Berlin, Germany

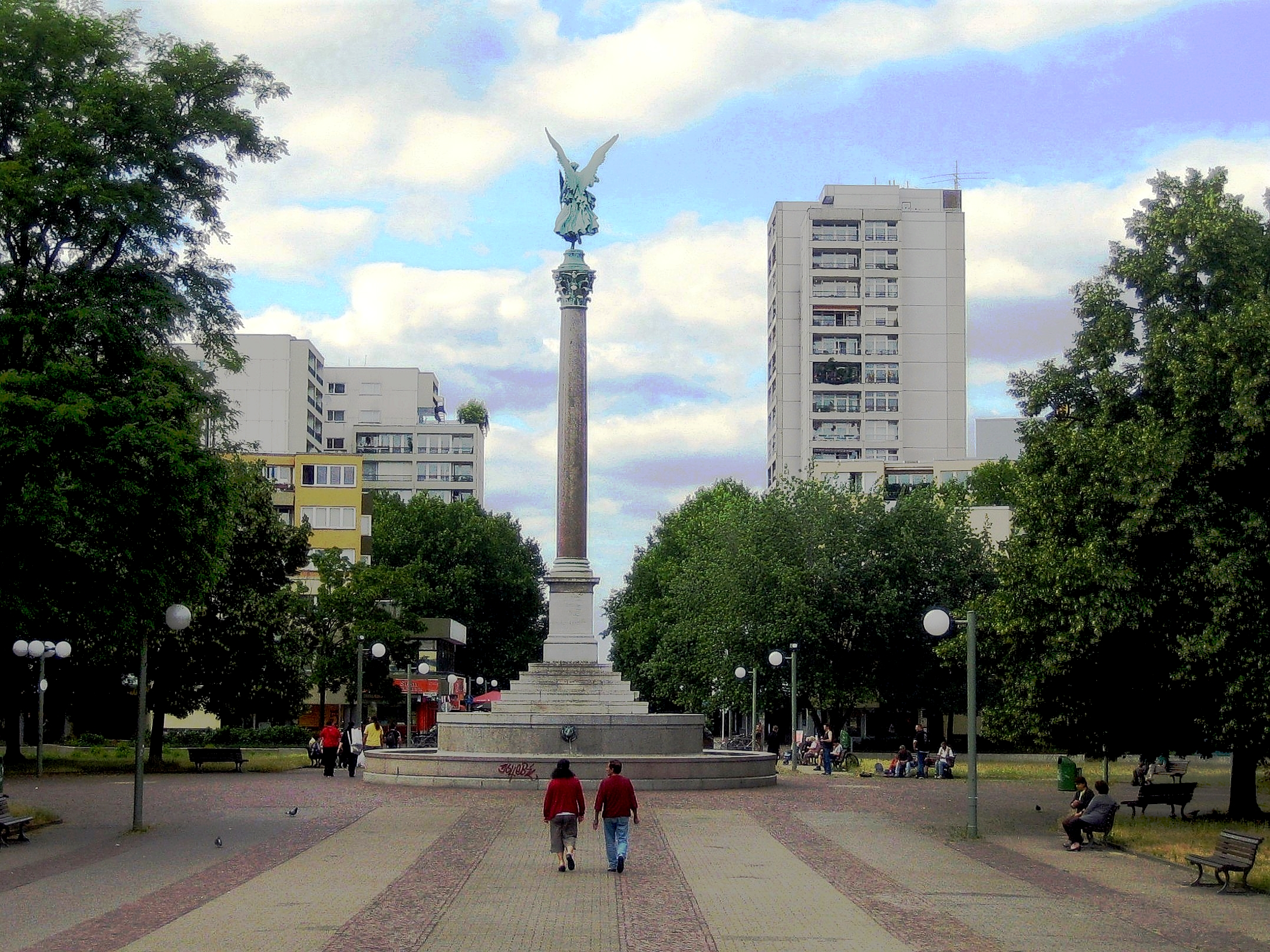
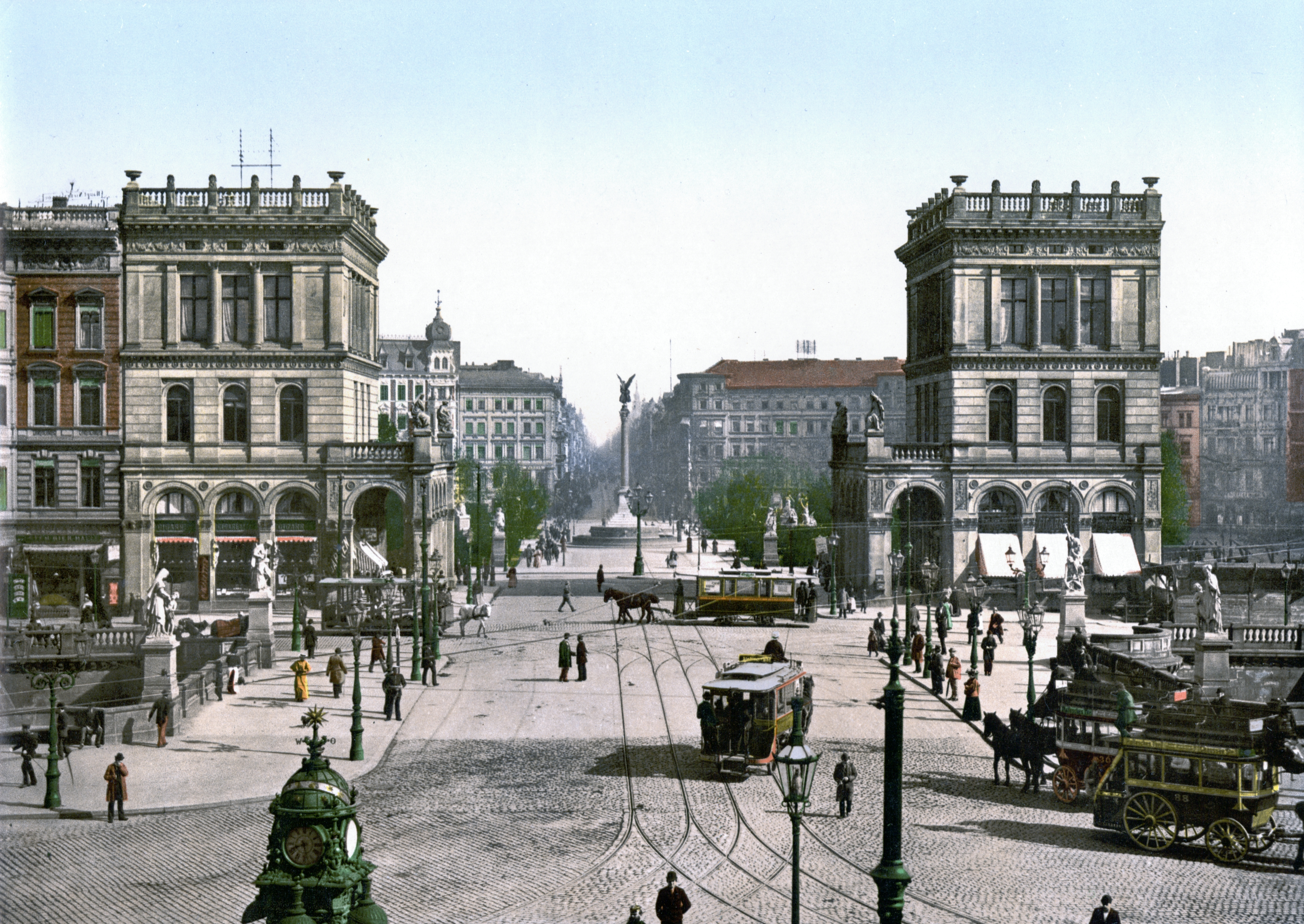
- Mehringplatz, 2006 Belle-Alliance-Platz, c. 1900
- Interactive map of Mehringplatz
- Former names: Rondell; (1734–1815); Belle-Alliance-Platz; (1815–1946); Franz-Mehring-Platz; (1946–1947)
- Namesake: Franz Mehring
- Type: Public square
- Location: Berlin, Germany
- Quarter: Kreuzberg
- Nearest metro station: Hallesches Tor
- Coordinates: 52°29′56″N 13°23′30″E
- Major junctions: Friedrichstraße; Friedrich-Stampfer-Straße; Brandesstraße

Construction
- Inauguration: 31 July 1947

Other
- Known for: Berlin Peace Column

Mehringplatz is a round plaza (or circus) at the southern tip of the Friedrichstadt neighborhood of Kreuzberg district, Berlin. It marks the southern end of Friedrichstraße. Until 1970 both Lindenstraße and Wilhelmstrasse led into it. In 1947 it was renamed after the publicist Franz Mehring (1846–1919).

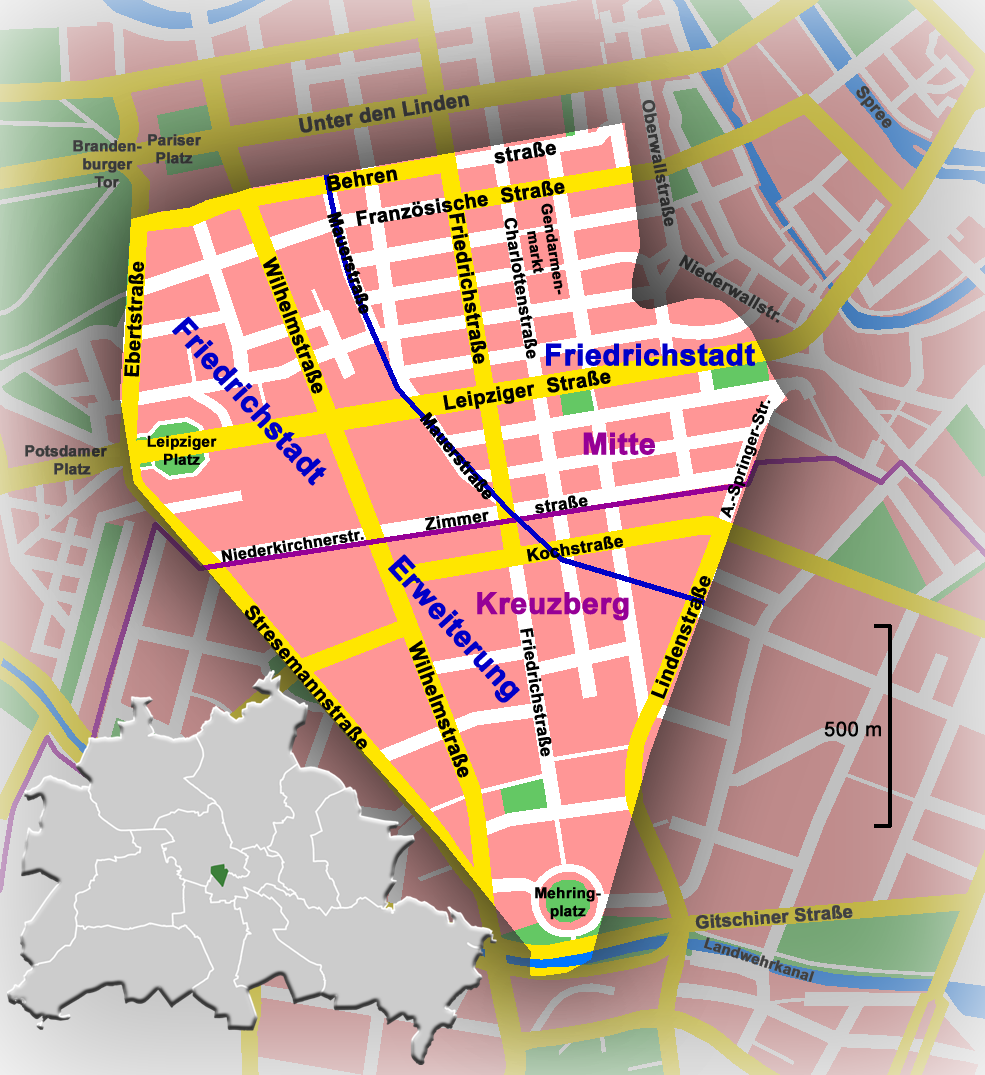
Location of Mehringplatz within Friedrichstadt, Berlin

Mehringplatz is one of three prominent squares laid out about 1730 in the course of the city's Baroque extension under King Frederick William I of Prussia, along with Pariser Platz (former Karree) and Leipziger Platz (Octagon). Due to its circular shape, Mehringplatz was initially known as Rondell; but on 22 October 1815, it was renamed Belle-Alliance-Platz after the Battle of La Belle Alliance, an alternative name for the Battle of Waterloo that was then popular in Prussia. Rondell was the southern entrance to Berlin via Hallesches Tor, a gate on the newer city wall on the outbound road to Halle.

The circus was refurbished during the 1830s, including the erection of the Friedenssäule ("Peace Column") with a statue of Victoria by Christian Daniel Rauch in 1843. The area was completely devastated in World War Two, particularly in an air raid on 3 February 1945 and the Battle of Berlin which followed. In the 1960s, Mehringplatz was redeveloped as a pedestrian zone that would anchor a large social housing area according to the realization of a plan conceived by Hans Scharoun, which was ultimately executed by the Berlin architect Werner Düttmann. During the 1990s, the installation of striking murals was used to decorate the lower walls of the courtyard areas of the housing blocks.
