= Kochstraße station =

Station of the Berlin U-Bahn

Coordinates: 52°30′21″N 13°23′26″E

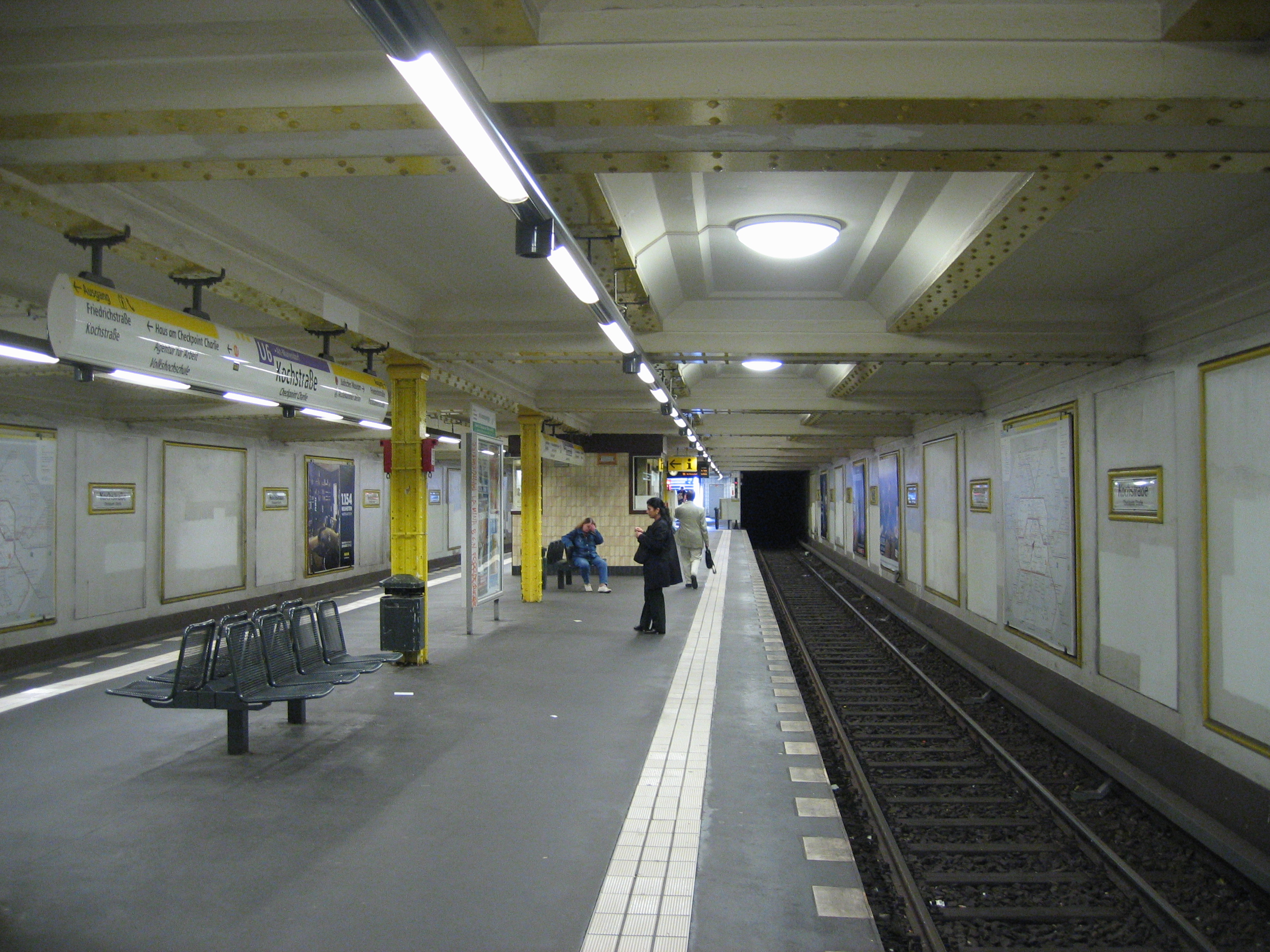
Kochstrasse

Kochstraße is a Berlin U-Bahn station located on the U6.

It is close to Checkpoint Charlie and the Checkpoint Charlie Museum.

== History ==
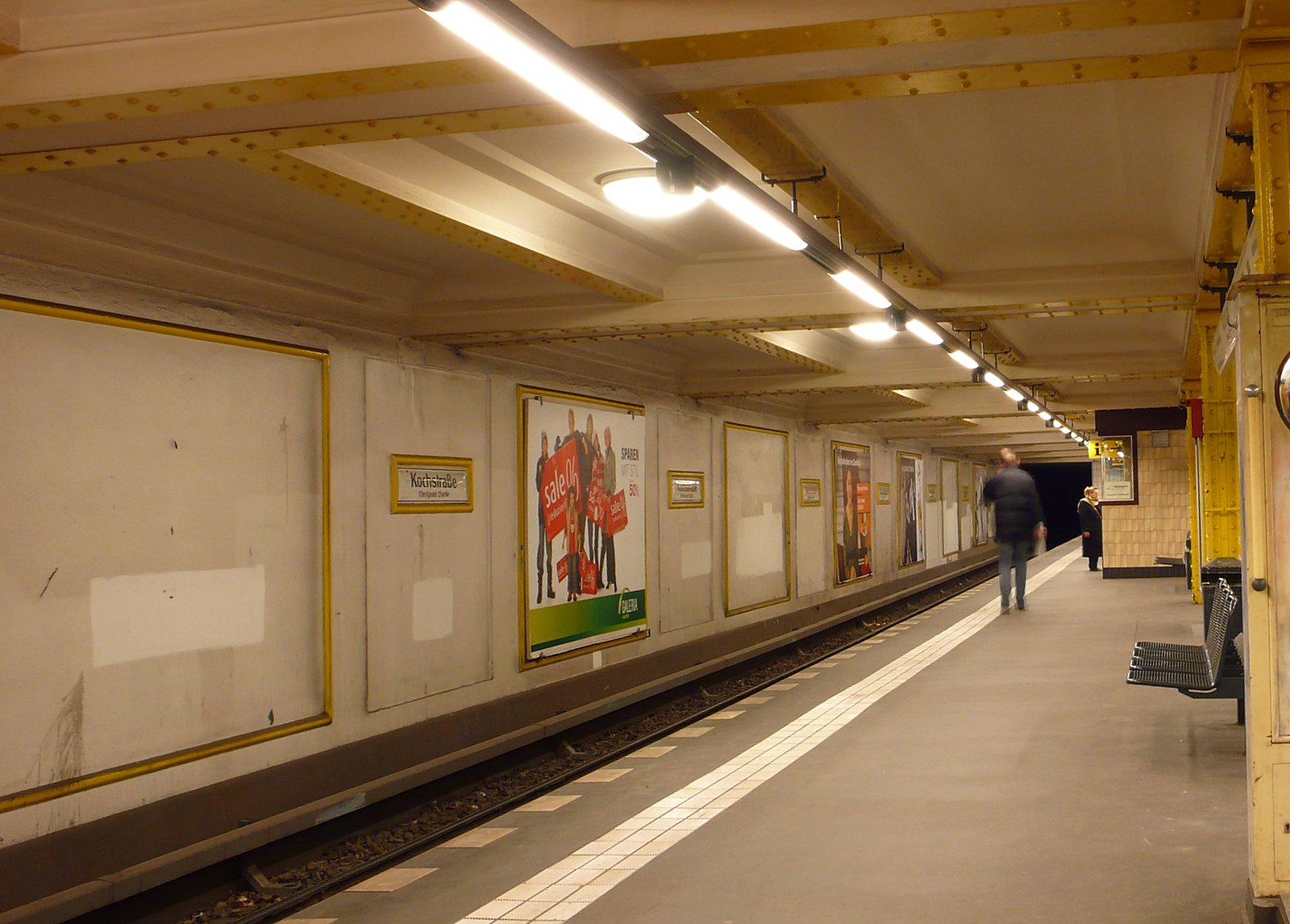
Platform in 2004

It was built by Grenander / Fehse in 1923. Due to a lack of money, the platform was made only 80 metres long. On 7 May 1944, there was a bomb damage in the station area on the ceiling and in the wall area. The station was closed for a few months in 1945, and from 1961 to 1990 it was the last stop in West Berlin. In 1995, the platform was lengthened by 26 metres.

== Notes ==
Preceding station	Berlin U-Bahn	Following station
Stadtmitte towards Alt-Tegel	U6	Hallesches Tor towards Alt-Mariendorf
