= Christian Gottlieb Cantian =

German stonemason and builder

(Johann) Christian Gottlieb Cantian (23 June 1794, Berlin - 11 April 1866) was a German stonemason and builder. His most notable achievement was the great granite bowl in Berlin's Lustgarten, weighing about 75 tons, and producing the red granite base and portico of the Berlin Victory Column.

== Bibliography ==
- Sibylle Einholz: Die Große Granitschale im Lustgarten. Zur Bedeutung eines Berliner Solitärs. Hrsg. v. Geschichtsverein Berlin: Der Bär von Berlin. Jahrbuch des Vereins Geschichte für Berlin 1997, S. 49.
- Ludwig Scherhag: Der Steinmetz und sein Material. Natursteinarbeiten in Deutschland. Beispiel Berlin, hrsg. vom Bundesinnungsverband des Deutschen Steinmetz-, Stein- und Holzbildhauerhandwerks (Ausstellungskatalog). Ebner, Ulm 1978, S. 42.
