= Wassertorplatz =

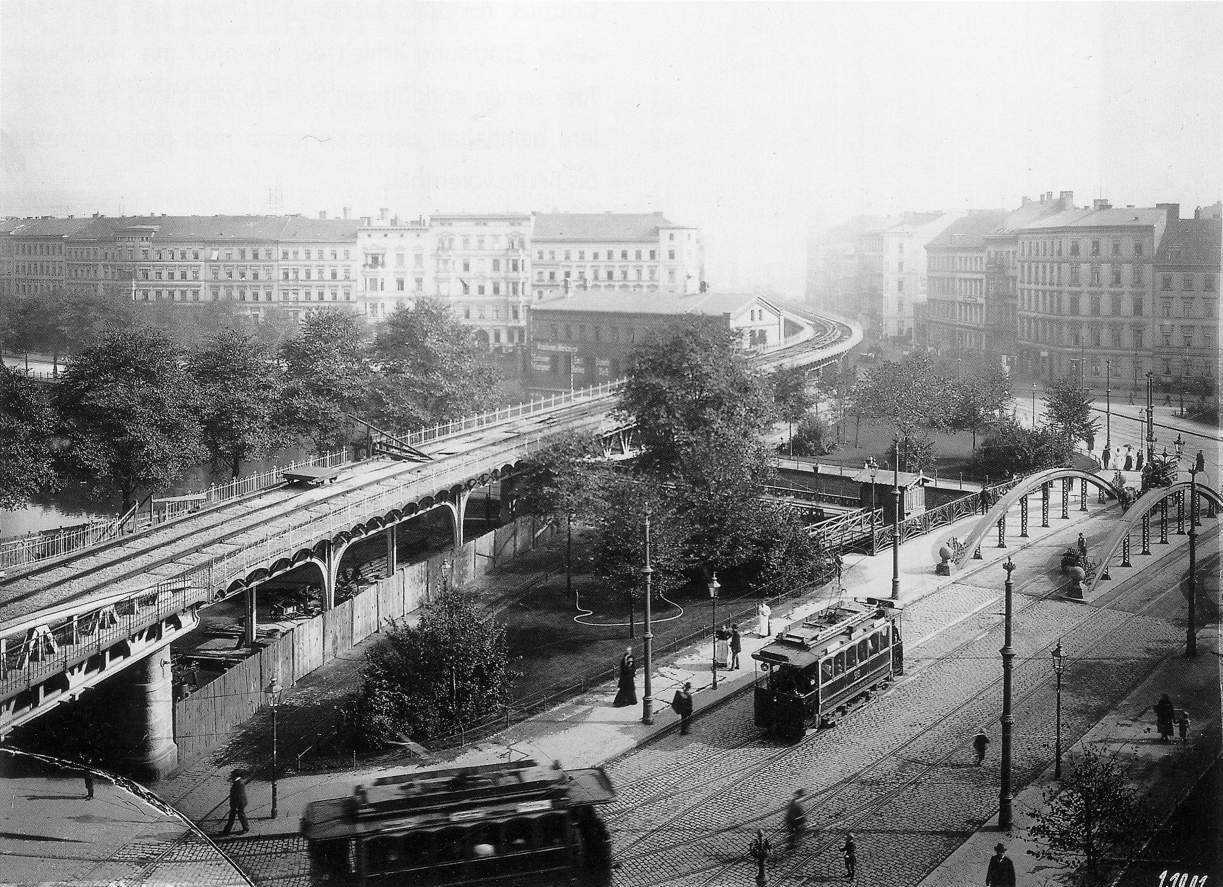
Construction of the elevated rail of the Berlin U-Bahn at Wassertorplatz, c. 1901

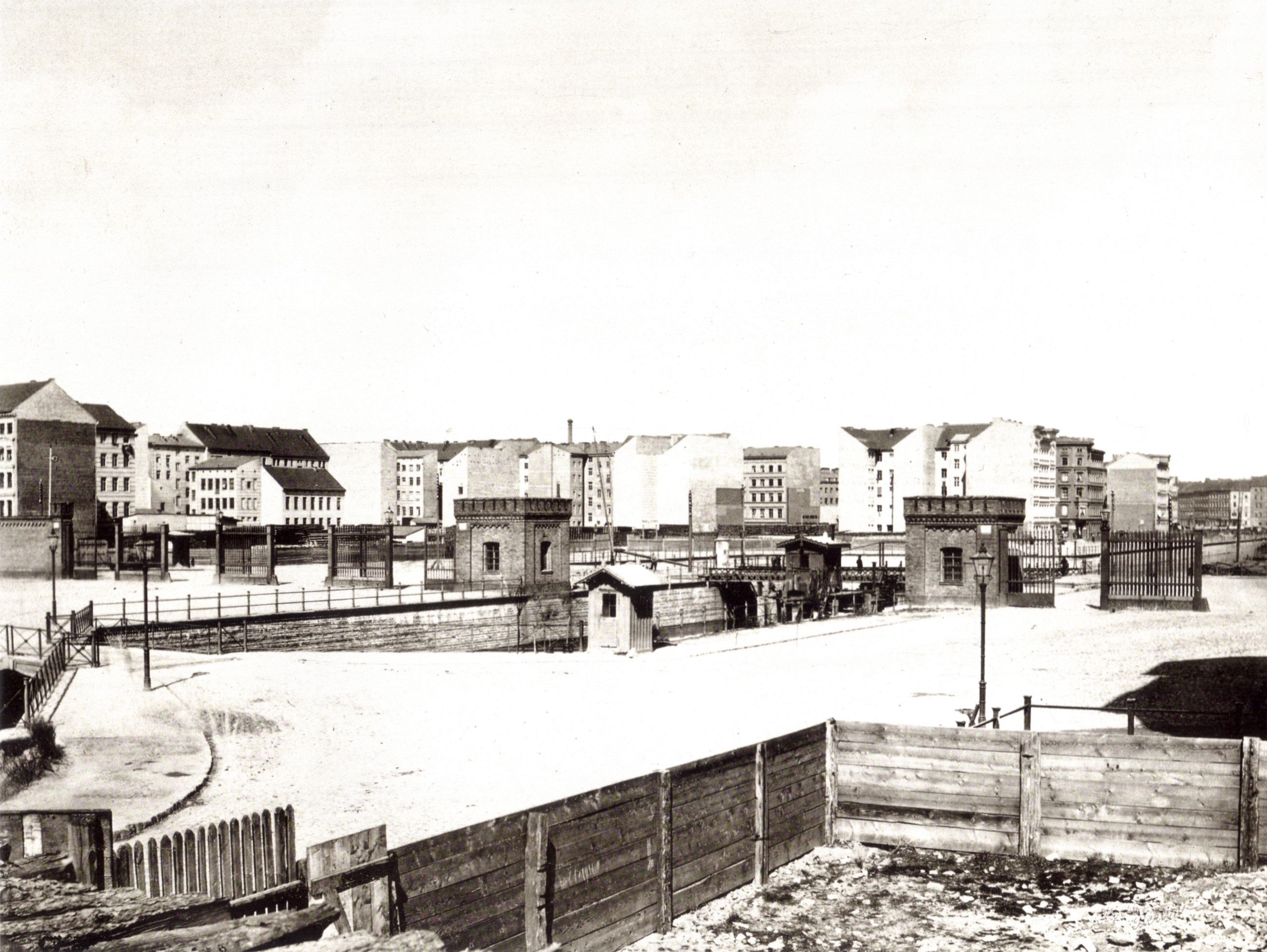
Wassertor 1865

The Wassertorplatz in the Berlin district of Kreuzberg is named after the historic Wassertor and is located about 200 meters west of the Kottbusser Tor. The place is currently divided by the heavily frequented Skalitzer Straße and the subway line U1, which runs over the middle strip of Skalitzer Straße as a raised railway.

== History ==
The square is named after the historic no longer existing water gate which was built during the 1848–1852 construction of the Luisenstadt Canal (Luisenstädtischer Kanal). The gate was located in the southeastern area of the Berlin Customs Wall, built in the 18th century, between Hallesches Tor and Kottbusser Tor. Ships entering the city on the canal had to check their goods and clear customs at the lockable gate in the form of an iron grate. Within the customs and excise wall, the canal expanded directly at the water gate to form the Thorbecken or Wassertorbecken.

The customs and excise wall lost its purpose with the rapid growth of the city and was demolished between 1867 and 1870. The Luisenstädtischer Kanal never achieved the importance for water traffic that it was originally intended to have and was filled in 1926.

== Current shape and structure ==
Between 1926 and 1928, the landscaper architect Erwin Barth redesigned the filled-in canal into a public green space, which is bordered by the Segitzdamm to the west and the Erkelenzdamm to the east in the area of the Wassertorplatz (the former Wassertor basin). A youth traffic school was built on the north side of the square, which has been cut through by the elevated railway since 1900. In 1981 and 1986, the architects Hinrich Baller and Inken Baller equipped the square with a pond, sculptures and a filigree "garden bridge" that leads over a lower park cut and is reminiscent of the former watercourse and the "real" bridge at this point. The square, along with the entire green belt of the former Luisenstädtischer Kanal, is included in Berlin's state monument list as a garden monument worthy of protection.

Some older houses directly on the square, with their historicist facades, are reminiscent of the original bourgeois milieu. Today, its surroundings in the southern part are almost completely covered with multi-storey new buildings, most of which were built as part of social housing and characterise the social structure with a high proportion of unemployed residents. Like the neighbouring Kottbusser Tor (Kotti), Wassertorplatz is considered a social hotspot. The Senate of Berlin designated the area around Kottbusser Tor as one of 17 areas with a special need for development The artificially created prevention area Kreuzberg Zentrum/Wassertorplatz has been receiving a district management programme since 1999.

== Citations ==
- Wassertorplatz. In: Straßennamenlexikon des Luisenstädtischen Bildungsvereins (beim Kaupert)
- Werner von Westhafen: Der Wassertorplatz.In: kreuzberger-chronik.de. April 2012.
- Quartiersmanagement Wassertorplatz, retrieved 15 March 2016.
- Lokales Portal KottiGuide
