= 1930 in Germany =

- Decades: 1910s; 1920s; 1930s; 1940s; 1950s
- See also: Other events of 1930; History of Germany • Timeline • Years

Events in the year 1930 in Germany.

== Incumbents ==
=== National level ===
- President - Paul von Hindenburg
- Chancellor – Hermann Müller (to 27 March), Heinrich Brüning (from 30 March)

=== State level ===
- Minister-President of Anhalt – Heinrich Deist
- President of the Republic of Baden – Franz Josef Wittemann
- Minister-President of Bavaria – Heinrich Held
- Minister-President of the Republic of Brunswick – Heinrich Jasper then Werner Küchenthal
- President of Hesse – Bernhard Adelung
- Chairman of Lippe – Heinrich Drake
- Minister-President of Mecklenburg-Schwerin – Karl Eschenburg
- Minister-President of Mecklenburg-Strelitz – Karl Gustav Hans Otto Freiherr von Reibnitz
- Prime Minister of the Republic of Oldenburg – Eugen von Finckh then Friedrich Cassebohm
- Minister-President of the Free State of Prussia – Otto Braun
- Minister-President of Saxony – Wilhelm Bünger (to 18 February) then Walther Schieck (from 6 May)
- State Councillor of Schaumburg-Lippe – Heinrich Lorenz
- Minister-President of Thuringia – Erwin Baum
- President of the Free People's State of Württemberg – Eugen Bolz

=== Cities ===
- Mayor of Berlin – Arthur Scholtz
- Mayor of Bremen – Martin Donandt
- Mayor of Hamburg – Rudolf Adolf Wilhelm Roß
- Mayor of Lübeck – Paul Löwigt

== Events ==
- 23 January – The Nazi Party gains its first minister as Wilhelm Frick becomes Minister of the Interior and Education in Thuringia as part of a right-wing coalition administration.
- 27 March – The government of Hermann Müller collapses.
- 30 March – A right of centre minority government takes office under Heinrich Brüning.
- 22 June – The growth of the Nazi Party continues as they become the second biggest party in the Landtag of Saxony
- 30 June – The French Army withdraws its troops from the Rhineland.
- 16 July – The government invokes Presidential Decree in order to force through its economic reforms.
- 18 July – The Social Democratic Party of Germany (SPD) force through a vote against the rule by decree resulting in the dissolution of the Reichstag and new elections.
- July – The German State Party is formed by a merger of the German Democratic Party and the Young German Order.
- 13 August – The Roman Catholic Archdiocese of Berlin is established.
- 14 September – The federal election sees the SPD remain as the biggest party but with the Nazis jumping into second place. Smaller gains are enjoyed by the Communist Party of Germany, the Christian-National Peasants' and Farmers' Party and the Centre Party whilst the main losers are the German National People's Party and the German People's Party.

== Arts ==
- 23 February – Erich Maria Remarque's anti-war classic All Quiet on the Western Front is banned in all Thuringian schools by Education Minister Wilhelm Frick.
- Operas debuting in Germany include Kurt Weill's Der Jasager, Ernst Krenek's Leben des Orest and Arnold Schoenberg's Von heute auf morgen.
- Fritz Reck-Malleczewen's comedy novel Bomben auf Monte Carlo is published.
- Nationalsozialistische Monatshefte, a cultural journal of the Nazi Party edited by Alfred Rosenberg, publishes its first issue.

== Communications ==
- 12 September – Sound newsreels appear for the first time in German cinemas.

== Science ==
- The Nobel Prize in Chemistry is won by Hans Fischer.
- The IG Farben Building, the headquarters of the chemical company IG Farben, is completed in Frankfurt.

== Sport ==
- 4–8 June – Albert Leidmann takes silver in the Light-Heavyweight division at the 1930 European Amateur Boxing Championships.
- 12 June – Max Schmeling defeats Jack Sharkey by disqualification in The Bronx to win the vacant New York State Athletic Commission and National Boxing Association World Heavyweight Championships. Schmeling is the first German World Heavyweight Champion under the Marquess of Queensberry Rules.
- 13–27 July – The 3rd Chess Olympiad is held in Hamburg with the hosts finishing third.
- Hertha BSC are crowned German football champions after defeating Holstein Kiel in the final.
- The 1930 European Figure Skating Championships are held in Berlin.

== Transport ==
- 22 January – Monte Cervantes struck a rock off Ushuia, Chile and sank with the loss of her captain.
- 26 July – The cargo schooner Nobiskrug is launched from Rendsburg harbour.
- 5 October – The Junkers Ju 52 makes its maiden flight.
- The airship LZ 127 Graf Zeppelin makes its first crossing of the South Atlantic.
- The luxury car Mercedes-Benz 770 begins production.

== Births ==
- 2 January – Gerhard Geise, mathematician (died 2010)
- 4 January – Christoph Albrecht, organist (died 2016)
- 9 January
  - Ernst-Dieter Lueg, journalist (died 2000)
  - Carl-Ludwig Wagner, CDU politician (died 2012)
- 11 January – Hartmut Gründler, protester who committed self-immolation (died 1977)
- 12 January – Klaus Scholder, ecclesiastical historian (died 1985)
- 21 January – Günter Lamprecht, actor (died 2022)
- 26 January – Reinhart Hummel, theologian (died 2007)
- 28 January – Kurt Biedenkopf, CDU politician (died 2021)
- 30 January
  - Alfred Herrhausen, banker (died 1989)
  - Egon Klepsch, German politician (died 2010)
- 31 January – Evelyn Richter, German art photographer (died 2021)
- 8 February
  - Erich Böhme, journalist and broadcaster (died 2009)
  - Hans Grauert, mathematician (died 2011)
- 18 February – Gerd Aretz, artist (died 2009)
- 21 February – Gerhard Scherhorn, economist (died 2018)
- 23 February – Ignaz Kiechle, CSU politician (died 2003)
- 3 March
  - Heiner Geißler, CDU politician (died 2017)
  - Hans Häckermann, German actor (died 1995)
- 8 March – Almuth Lütkenhaus, sculptor (died 1996)
- 10 March – Fritz Schenk, broadcast journalist (died 2006)
- 11 March – August von Finck Jr., banker (died 2021)
- 13 March – Günther Uecker, artist (died 2025)
- 14 March
  - Helga Feddersen, entertainer (died 1990)
  - Dieter Schnebel, composer (died 2018)
- 3 April – Helmut Kohl, CDU politician and Chancellor of Germany (died 2017)
- 7 April – Andrew Sachs, German-born British actor (died 2016 in the United Kingdom)
- 8 April – Hans Jörg Stetter, mathematician (died 2025)
- 11 April – Walter Krüger, athlete (died 2018)
- 12 April – Gustav Scholz, German boxer (died 2000)
- 14 April – Martin Adolf Bormann (died 2013), priest, son of Martin Bormann and godson of Adolf Hitler
- 21 April – Eva Probst, actress (died 2018)
- 25 April – Peter Schulz, SPD politician (died 2013)
- 28 April – Jürgen Ahrend, organ builder (died 2024)
- 29 April – Claus Ogerman, arranger and orchestrator (died 2016)
- 6 May – Karl-Heinz Kammerling, academic teacher of pianists (died 2012)
- 7 May – Horst Bienek, novelist (died 1990)
- 17 May – Alfons Lütke-Westhues, equestrian (died 2004)
- 29 May
  - Burkhard Hirsch, FDP politician (died 2020)
  - Ekkehard Schall, actor/director (died 2005)
- 3 June – Wulff-Dieter Heintz, astronomer (died 2006)
- 5 June
  - Ursula Lehr, politician (died 2022)
  - Carl Otto Lenz, lawyer and CDU politician
- 8 June – Robert Aumann, German-born Israeli-American mathematician, Nobel Memorial Prize in Economics laureate
- 9 June - Erich Häusser, lawyer and judge (died 1999)
- 10 June - Theo Sommer, newspaper editor (died 2022)
- 13 June - Gotthard Graubner, painter (died 2013)
- 15 June – Christine Görner, actress and opera singer (died 2024)
- 22 June – Reinhold Remmert, mathematician (died 2016)
- 26 June – Wolfgang Schwanitz, head of the Stasi (died 2022)
- 27 June – Volker Vogeler, film director (died 2005)
- 30 June – Karl-Heinz Holze, footballer (died 2000)
- 6 July – Herbert Erhardt, footballer (died 2010)
- 14 July – Horst Rittel, design theorist (died 1990)
- 16 July – Horst Rittner, chess player (died 2021)
- 18 July – Siegfried Kurz, conductor and composer (died 2023)
- 20 July – Heinz Kubsch, footballer (died 1993)
- 23 July – Ingrid Hartmann, sprint canoer (died 2006)
- 28 July – Hans Schröder, sculptor and painter (died 2010)
- 30 July – Helmut Kirchmeyer, musicologist
- 4 August – Götz Friedrich, opera and theatre director (died 2000)
- 11 August – Heinz Werner Zimmermann, composer (died 2022)
- 16 August – Wolfgang Völz, actor (died 2018)
- 25 August – Rainer Zepperitz, double bassist (died 2009)
- 8 September – Mario Adorf, actor (died 2026)
- 10 September – Adolf Endler, author (died 2009)
- 19 September – Ernst-Wolfgang Böckenförde, judge (died 2019)
- 21 September — Fred Herzog, German photographer (died 2019)
- 24 September – Horst Sachtleben, actor (died 2022)
- 26 September – Fritz Wunderlich, opera singer (died 1966)
- 5 October – Reinhard Selten, German economist (died 2016)
- 11 October – Harry Glaß, German ski jumper (died 1997)
- 17 October
  - Freimut Börngen, German astronomer (died 2021)
  - Karl-Wilhelm Welwei, German historian (died 2013)
- 25 October – John Sprinzel, racing driver (died 2021)
- 1 November – Edgar Basel, German boxer (died 1977)
- 5 November – Hans Mommsen (died 2015) and Wolfgang Mommsen (died 2004), German historians and twin brothers
- 20 November - Rudi Felgenheier, German motorcycle racer (died 2005)
- 22 November - Ferdinand von Bismarck, Fürst von Bismarck (died 2019)
- 26 November - Berthold Leibinger, engineer and entrepreneur (died 2018)
- 27 November – Reinhard Glemnitz, actor
- 30 November – Eberhard Eimler, general (died 2022)
- 1 December – Joachim Hoffmann, historian (died 2002)
- 4 December – Paul-Heinz Dittrich, composer (died 2020)
- 6 December – Rolf Hoppe, film actor (died 2018)
- 9 December – Carl-August Fleischhauer, judge (died 2005)
- 10 December – Avraham Ahituv, German-born Israeli intelligence chief (died 2009)
- 13 December – Nathan Zach, German-born Israeli poet (died 2022)
- 15 December – Günter Siebert, German football player, executive (d. 2017)
- 17 December
  - Erhard Geißler, biologist
  - Armin Mueller-Stahl, film actor
- 19 December – Georg Stollenwerk, footballer (died 2014)
- 21 December – Wolfgang Pietzsch, chess grand master (died 1996)
- 26 December – Wilferd Madelung, scholar of Islam (died 2023)
- 28 December – Franzl Lang, yodeller (died 2015)

== Deaths ==
- 3 January – Guglielmo Plüschow, photographer (born 1852)
- 14 January – Hermann von Hatzfeldt, civil servant (born 1848)
- 24 January – Adolf Kneser, mathematician (born 1862)
- 5 February – Friedrich von Duhn, classical scholar (born 1851)
- 9 February – Augustinus Bludau, Bishop of Ermland (born 1862)
- 11 February – Franz Winter, German archaeologist (born 1861)
- 18 February – Adolf Köster, German diplomat and politician (born 1883)
- 21 February – Heinrich Kroll, German fighter ace (b. 1894)
- 23 February – Horst Wessel, Sturmabteilung member and Nazi Party "martyr" (born 1907)
- 24 February - Hermann von Ihering, zoologist (born 1859)
- 6 March - Alfred von Tirpitz, Admiral and founder of the German Imperial Navy (born 1849)
- 10 March – Paul von Breitenbach, railway planner (born 1850)
- 31 March
  - Emil Krebs, sinologist (born 1867)
  - Ludwig Schüler, Mayor of Marburg (born 1836)
- 1 April – Cosima Wagner, founder of the Bayreuth Festival (born 1837)
- 19 April - Ernst Georg Ferdinand Küster, surgeon (born 1839)
- 30 April - Max Maurenbrecher, SPD and Fatherland Party politician (born 1874)
- 29 May – Ludwig Rehn, surgeon (born 1849)
- 7 June – Julius Smend, theologian (born 1857)
- 10 June – Adolf von Harnack, theologian (born 1851)
- 8 July – Gustav Weigand, linguist (born 1860)
- 29 July
  - Theodor Axenfeld, ophthalmologist (born 1867)
  - Alexander von Fielitz, composer (born 1860)
- 4 August – Siegfried Wagner, composer and conductor (born 1869)Carr, Jonathan (2007). The Wagner clan. London: Faber. p. 406. ISBN 9780571260966.
- 8 August - Walther Reinhardt, Army officer (born 1872)
- 10 September - Eugen Diederichs, publisher (born 1867)
- 20 September - Moritz Pasch, mathematician (born 1843)
- 24 September – Otto Mueller, painter (born 1874)
- 28 September – Prince Leopold of Bavaria, nobleman and Field Marshal (born 1846)
- 10 October – Adolf Engler, botanist (born 1844)
- 27 October – Alexander Baerwald, architect (born 1877)
- 11 November – Paul Hensel, philosopher (born 1860)
- 17 November – Hans Kniep, botanist (born 1881)
- 11 December – Friedrich von Bernhardi, Prussian Army general (born 1849)
- 30 November – Max Skladanowsky, German German inventor and early filmmaker (born 1863)
- 15 December – Johannes Hoffmann, SPD Minister-President of Bavaria (born 1867)
- 16 December – Carl August Heinrich Ferdinand Oesterley, painter (born 1839)
- 19 December – Conrad Willgerodt, chemist (born 1841)
- 24 December – Eduard David, politician (born 1863)
- 25 December – Eugen Goldstein, physicist (born 1850)
