= 2007 in Germany =

- Decades: 1980s; 1990s; 2000s; 2010s; 2020s
- See also: Other events of 2007; History of Germany • Timeline • Years

Events in the year 2007 in Germany.

== Incumbents ==
=== Federal level ===
- President – Horst Köhler
- Chancellor – Angela Merkel

=== State level ===
- Minister-President of Baden-Württemberg – Günther Oettinger
- Minister-President of Bavaria – Edmund Stoiber to 30 September, Günther Beckstein
- Governing mayor of Berlin – Klaus Wowereit
- First mayor of Bremen – Jens Böhrnsen
- Minister-President of Brandenburg – Matthias Platzeck
- First mayor of Hamburg – Ole von Beust
- Minister-President of Hesse – Roland Koch
- Minister-President of Lower Saxony – Christian Wulff
- Minister-President of Mecklenburg-Vorpommern – Harald Ringstorff
- Minister-President of North Rhine-Westphalia – Jürgen Rüttgers
- Minister-President of Rhineland-Palatinate – Kurt Beck
- Minister-President of the Saarland – Peter Müller
- Minister-President of Saxony – Georg Milbradt
- Minister-President of Saxony-Anhalt – Wolfgang Böhmer
- Minister-President of Schleswig-Holstein – Peter Harry Carstensen
- Minister-President of Thuringia – Dieter Althaus

== Events ==
- 1 January - Germany assumes presidency of the G8 for the year and presidency of the Council of the European Union for six months.
- 1 January - Value added tax is raised from 16% to 19%.
- 1 January - BenQ-Siemens in Munich declares insolvency.
- 5 January - Mounir El Motassadeq was sentenced in Hamburg to 15 years prison for his involvement in the September 11, 2001 attacks.
- 8 January - Russian oil supplies to Germany, Poland, and Ukraine are cut for three days as part of the Russia-Belarus energy dispute.
- 18 January - Following in-party pressure, Edmund Stoiber announces his resignation as Minister-President of Bavaria and chairman of the CSU, effective on 30 September.
- 18 January - Hurricane Kyrill, the worst storm to hit Germany since 1999, kills 13 in Germany and at least 31 in the rest of Western Europe.
- 2 February - The federal parliament passes a reform in health insurance, making insurance compulsory for all German citizens.
- 8 March - Germany in the Eurovision Song Contest 2007
- 9 March - The national retirement age is raised to 67.
- 9 March - War in Afghanistan: The federal parliament approves the deployment of Panavia Tornados to Afghanistan. Threats against Germany by Al-Qaeda soon follow.
- 25 March - In Berlin, 27 European ministers celebrate the 50th anniversary of the Treaty of Rome.
- 11 April - In Beirut, the trial begins for one of the Lebanese perpetrators of the 2006 German train bombing plot.
- 12 April - A Tornado fighter jet of the German air force (Luftwaffe) collides with a rock face in the Swiss Bernese Oberland. One pilot ejects to safety, one dies.
- 13 April - Günther Oettinger, Minister-President of Baden-Württemberg, creates controversy with his eulogy of predecessor Hans Filbinger. Oettinger describes Filbinger as an opponent of the Nazi regime, although Filbinger was a member of the Nazi party and his true role during the war is still disputed.
- 7 May - President Horst Köhler rejects a request to pardon Red Army Faction terrorist Christian Klar, who is serving a life sentence for the murder of banker Jürgen Ponto
- 13 May - State election in Bremen - The SPD and CDU, who have governed Bremen since 1995 in a grand coalition under Jens Böhrnsen (SPD), both suffer losses although the SPD remains the strongest party. The Left Party.PDS enjoy their first success in a western German state with enough votes to enter the Senate of Bremen. After two months of negotiations, a red-green alliance (SPD and Greens) is established.
- 14 May - The Stuttgart-based car manufacturer DaimlerChrysler sells its American daughter company Chrysler for 5500 million euros, ending a 10-year union. After the demerger, DaimlerChrysler is renamed to Daimler AG.
- 24 May - Cyclist Erik Zabel confesses to doping with EPO for at least one week during the 1996 Tour de France, only to stop due to the adverse effects of the drugs on his health. At this same press conference, Rolf Aldag also confesses to long-term EPO use.
- 1 June - The DAX exceeds 8000 points for the first time in eight years.
- 6–8 June - 33rd G8 summit in Heiligendamm, Mecklenburg-Vorpommern.
- 16 June - The Left Party.PDS and the WASG fuse to form the Left Party.
- 16 June - 23 September: documenta 12
- 1 September - The first Extra Mile Endurathon in Berlin.
- 21 December - Border controls with Germany's eastern neighbours are removed as the Czech Republic, Poland and seven other countries join the Schengen border-free zone. The only remaining German border with border controls is that with Switzerland.
- Date unknown: Volkswagen AG gained ownership of Swedish company Scania by first buying Volvo's stake in 2000, after the latter's aborted takeover attempt, increasing it to 36.4% in the first quarter 2007.

== Popular culture ==
=== Arts & Literature ===
- 22 February Lothar-Günther Buchheim, German author, painter, and art collector (b.1918).

=== Film ===
- 8-18 February - 57th Berlin International Film Festival
- 25 February - The Lives of Others (Das Leben der Anderen) wins the 2006 Academy Award for Best Foreign Language Film.

=== Sport ===
- 4 February - Handball - Germany wins the 2007 World Men's Handball Championship held in Germany, defeating Poland in the final in Cologne.
- 18 February - Indoor field hockey - Germany wins the 2007 World Indoor Field Hockey Championship held in Vienna, Austria, defeating Poland in the final and defend their title. The women's team - also the previous champions - take third place.
- 20 February - Ice hockey - The Adler Mannheim win the Deutscher Eishockey-Pokal.
- 31 March - Boxing - Henry Maske returns to the ring after an 11-year absence to avenge his only professional defeat, beating Virgil Hill after 12 rounds by unanimous decision. Immediately after the bout, Maske announces his final retirement.
- 8 April - Curling - Germany take second place at the 2007 Ford World Men's Curling Championship in Edmonton, Canada, losing to the host nation in the final.
- 17 April - Ice hockey - The Adler Mannheim win the Deutsche Eishockey Liga for the sixth time, becoming the first team to win both the league and cup titles in a single season.
- 22 April - Handball - HSV Hamburg wins the EHF Cup Winner's Cup final against CB Ademar León.
- 29 April - Handball - THW Kiel wins the all-German final of the EHF Champions League against SG Flensburg-Handewitt. SC Magdeburg wins the EHF Cup final against CAI BM Aragón.
- 5 May - Volleyball - VfB Friedrichshafen become German volleyball champions for the seventh time.
- 12 May - Rugby - RG Heidelberg wins the final of the Rugby-Bundesliga.
- 19 May - Football - VfB Stuttgart wins the 2006–07 season of the Bundesliga for the fifth time.
- 28 May - Field hockey - Crefelder HTC wins the EuroHockey Club Champions Cup for the first time.
- 2 June - Handball - THW Kiel become national handball champions for a record 13th time.
- 26 June - Basketball - The Brose Baskets from Bamberg become German champions in the Basketball Bundesliga for the second time.
- 1 July - American football - The Marburg Mercenaries are defeated by the Dodge Vikings Vienna in the Eurobowl.
- 8 July - Field hockey - Der Club and der Alster in Hamburg become German field hockey champions for the fifth time.
- 24 August to 2 September - 2007 World Championships in Athletics in Osaka, Japan. Germany finishes fifth on the overall medal tally.
- 30 September - Football - Germany wins the 2007 FIFA Women's World Cup in Shanghai, China, defeating Brazil and not surrendering a single goal during the tournament. The German team becomes the first women's team to win two consecutive titles.
- 21 October - Handball - THW Kiel wins the EHF Men's Champions Trophy, defeating Celje Pivovarna Laško in the final, completing the most successful year in the club's history (EHF Champions League, national champions, EHF Champions Trophy). Two other German teams — HSV Hamburg and SC Magdeburg — take third and fourth place.
- 16 December - Handball - Germany takes third place in the 2007 World Women's Handball Championship held in France, defeating Romania in Paris.

== Births ==
- 26 March - Prince Moritz of Hesse

== Deaths ==
- 16 January - Rudolf August Oetker, German entrepreneur (born 1916)
- 27 January - Herbert Reinecker, German dramatist and screenwriter (born 1914)
- 9 February - Reinhart Hummel, German theologian (born 1930)
- 22 February - Lothar-Günther Buchheim, author, painter, and art collector (born 1918)
- 27 February – Bernd Freytag von Loringhoven, German army officer (born 1914)
- 28 February - Egon Monk, German film director and writer (born 1927)
- 1 April - Hans Filbinger, jurist and politician (born 1913)
- 13 April - Marion Yorck von Wartenburg, jurist and Resistance fighter (born 1904)
- 22 April - Karl Holzamer, German philosopher, pedagogue and former director general of the German television station ZDF (born 1906)
- 28 April - Carl Friedrich von Weizsäcker, German physicist (born 1912)
- 19 May - Hans Wollschläger, German writer (born 1935)
- 28 May — Jörg Immendorff, German painter (born 1945)
- 2 June - Wolfgang Hilbig, German author (born 1941)
- 19 June - Klausjürgen Wussow, actor (born 1929)
- 22 June - Bernd Becher, photographer (born 1931)
- 26 June - Jupp Derwall, footballer and coach (born 1927)
- 1 July - Gottfried von Bismarck, aristocrat and socialite (born 1962)
- 4 July - Liane Bahler, cyclist (born 1982)
- 22 July - Ulrich Mühe, actor (born 1953)
- 23 July - Ernst Otto Fischer, chemist, Nobel Prize in Chemistry (born 1918)
- 6 August (approximate date) - Heinz Barth, German war criminal (born 1920)
- 11 August - Wolf Hilbertz, German futurist architect, inventor, and marine scientist (born 1938)
- 25 August - Hansjörg Felmy, actor (born 1931)
- 21 September - Jürgen Roland, German film director (born 1925)
- 5 October - Walter Kempowski, German writer (born 1929)
- 17 October - Rüdiger von Wechmar, German diplomat (born 1923)
- 28 October - Evelyn Hamann, actress and comedian (born 1942)
- 28 November - Elly Beinhorn, pilot (born 1907)
- 5 December - Karlheinz Stockhausen, composer (born 1928)

== See also ==
- 2007 in German television
