= 2009 in Germany =

- Decades: 1980s; 1990s; 2000s; 2010s; 2020s
- See also: Other events of 2009; History of Germany • Timeline • Years

Events in the year 2009 in Germany.

== Incumbents ==
=== Federal level ===
- President – Horst Köhler
- Chancellor – Angela Merkel

=== State level ===
- Minister-President of Baden-Württemberg – Günther Oettinger
- Minister-President of Bavaria – Horst Seehofer
- Governing mayor of Berlin – Klaus Wowereit
- First mayor of Bremen – Jens Böhrnsen
- Minister-President of Brandenburg – Matthias Platzeck
- First mayor of Hamburg – Ole von Beust
- Minister-President of Hesse – Roland Koch
- Minister-President of Lower Saxony – Christian Wulff
- Minister-President of Mecklenburg-Vorpommern – Erwin Sellering
- Minister-President of North Rhine-Westphalia – Jürgen Rüttgers
- Minister-President of Rhineland-Palatinate – Kurt Beck
- Minister-President of the Saarland – Peter Müller
- Minister-President of Saxony – Stanislaw Tillich
- Minister-President of Saxony-Anhalt – Wolfgang Böhmer
- Minister-President of Schleswig-Holstein – Peter Harry Carstensen
- Minister-President of Thuringia – Dieter Althaus

== Events ==
- 15 January – Germany presses Moscow and Kyiv to end the Russian gas crisis.
- 5–15 February – 59th Berlin International Film Festival
- 9 February – Germany in the Eurovision Song Contest 2009
- March – The Volkswagen Polo Mk5 is launched at the Geneva Motor Show and was voted European Car of the Year eight months later.
- 11 March – A 17-year-old former student goes on a rampage at his former school in Winnenden, Germany, killing at least fifteen people, before turning the gun on himself.
- 23 May – 2009 German presidential election
- 15–23 August – 2009 World Championships in Athletics takes place in Berlin. Usain Bolt breaks the world records for 200 metres and 100 metres.
- 30 August – 2009 Saarland state election, 2009 Saxony state election and 2009 Thuringia state election take place
- September – Opel launches new Astra at Frankfurt Motor Show.
- 27 September – 2009 German federal election takes place. Angela Merkel wins reelection as chancellor.
- 27 September – 2009 Schleswig-Holstein state election and 2009 Brandenburg state election take place.
- 28 October – German bishop Margot Käßmann becomes first elected woman as leader of Evangelical Church in Germany.
- 28 October – The Second Merkel cabinet led by Angela Merkel was sworn in.
- 30 October – Christine Lieberknecht (CDU) becomes Minister-President of state Thuringia.
- 27 November – Wolfgang Schneiderhan, the Chief of Staff of the German Bundeswehr, and Franz Josef Jung resign over allegations that they withheld information in the aftermath of the Kunduz airstrike.
- 30 November – Ursula von der Leyen becomes Federal Ministry of Labour and Social Affairs (Germany) and Kristina Köhler becomes new Federal Ministry of Family Affairs, Senior Citizens, Women and Youth
- December – Dresdner Bank was acquired by German Commerzbank.

== Deaths ==
- 5 January – Adolf Merckle, industrialist (born 1934)
- 2 March – Ernst Benda, politician (born 1925)
- 3 March - Johanna König, actress (born 1921)
- 28 March – Helmut Noller, Olympic canoe sprinter (born 1919)
- 25 April – Birgitta Wolf, 96, Swedish writer in Germany (born 1913).
- 4 May – Gisela Stein, German actress (born 1935)
- 13 May – Monica Bleibtreu, German actress (born 1944)
- 23 May – Barbara Rudnik, actress (born 1958)
- 9 June – Karl Michael Vogler, actor (born 1928)
- 17 June – Ralf Dahrendorf, sociologist and politician (born 1929)
- 19 June – Joerg Hube, actor (born 1943)
- 30 June – Pina Bausch, choreographer and dancer (born 1940)
- 30 July – Peter Zadek, theatre and film director (born 1926)
- 18 August – Hildegard Behrens, opera singer (born 1937)
- 22 August – Horst E. Brandt, film director (born 1923)
- 29 August – Mady Rahl, actress (born 1915)
- 19 September – Eduard Zimmermann, journalist (born 1929)
- 3 October – Reinhard Mohn, businessman (born 1921)
- 4 October – Guenther Rall, fighter pilot (born 1918)
- 6 October – Werner Maihofer, jurist and legal philosopher (born 1918)
- 9 October – Horst Szymaniak, footballer (born 1934)
- 19 October – Dietrich von Bothmer, art historian (born 1918)
- 10 November – Robert Enke, footballer (born 1977)
- 15 November – Hans Matthöfer, German politician (born 1925)
- 27 November – Erich Böhme, journalist (born 1930)
- 5 December – Otto Graf Lambsdorff, German politician of the Free Democratic Party (born 1926)
- 23 December – Rainer Zepperitz, German double bassist (born 1930)

== See also ==
- 2009 in German television
