= 2005 in Germany =

- Decades: 1980s; 1990s; 2000s; 2010s; 2020s
- See also: Other events of 2005; History of Germany • Timeline • Years

Events in the year 2005 in Germany.

== Incumbents ==
- President: Horst Köhler
- Chancellor:
  - Gerhard Schröder (until 22 November 2005)
  - Angela Merkel (from 22 November 2005)

== Events ==
- 20 January - German Visa Affair 2005
- 7 February - Honor killing of Hatun Sürücü
- 10–20 February - 55th Berlin International Film Festival
- 12 February -Bundesvision Song Contest 2005
- 12 March - Germany in the Eurovision Song Contest 2005
- 30 May - Allianz Arena in Munich is opened.
- 2 September - SAP Arena in Mannheim is opened.
- 16–21 August - World Youth Day 2005 in Cologne
- 22 November - The First Merkel cabinet led by Angela Merkel was sworn in.
- Date unknown: German company HypoVereinsbank was acquired by Italian company UniCredit Bank AG.

== Elections ==
- German federal election, 2005
- North Rhine-Westphalia state election, 2005
- Schleswig-Holstein state election, 2005

== Sport ==
- Bundesliga scandal (2005)
- 2004–05 Bundesliga
- 2004–05 2. Bundesliga
- 2005 FIFA Confederations Cup
- 2004–05 Deutsche Eishockey Liga season
- 2005 German Grand Prix
- 2005 European Grand Prix
- 2005 German motorcycle Grand Prix
- 2005 BMW Open

== Births ==
- 31 January – Laurin Ulrich, footballer
- 11 March – Kim Marie Vaske, para-athlete
- 26 December – Charlott Schaffrath, ice hockey player

== Deaths ==
- 14 January - Rudolph Moshammer, German fashion designer (born 1940)
- 3 February - Ernst Mayr, German biologist (born 1904)
- 21 February - Horst Drinda, German actor (born 1927)
- 24 February - Hans-Jürgen Wischnewski, German politician (born 1922)
- 6 March - Hans Bethe, German nuclear physicist (born 1906)
- 7 March - Walter Arendt, German politician (born 1925)
- 8 March – Brigitte Mira, German actress (born 1910)
- 15 March - Konrad Hesse, German judge (born 1919)
- 1 April - Harald Juhnke, German actor and comedian (born 1929)
- 16 April - Volker Vogeler, German film director (born 1930)
- 2 May — Hermann Dörnemann, German supercentenarian (born 1893)
- 19 May - Paul Schneider-Esleben, German architect (born 1915)
- 23 May - Ernst Jakob Henne, German motorcycle racer and racing driver (born 1904)
- 7 June - Ulrich Briefs, German politician (born 1939)
- 8 July Peter Boenisch, German journalist (born 1927)
- 14 July - Tilly Fleischer, German athlete (born 1911)
- 28 August - Hans Clarin, German actor (born 1929)
- 4 September - Carl-August Fleischhauer, judge (born 1930)
- 12 September Helmut Baierl, German playwright (born 1926)
- 20 October - Rudi Felgenheier, motorcycle race (born 1930)
- 8 November - Carola Höhn, German actress (born 1910)
- 1 December - Karin Himboldt, German actress (born 1920)

== See also ==
- 2005 in German television
