= 1933 in Germany =

- Decades: 1910s; 1920s; 1930s; 1940s; 1950s
- See also: Other events of 1933; History of Germany; Timeline; Years

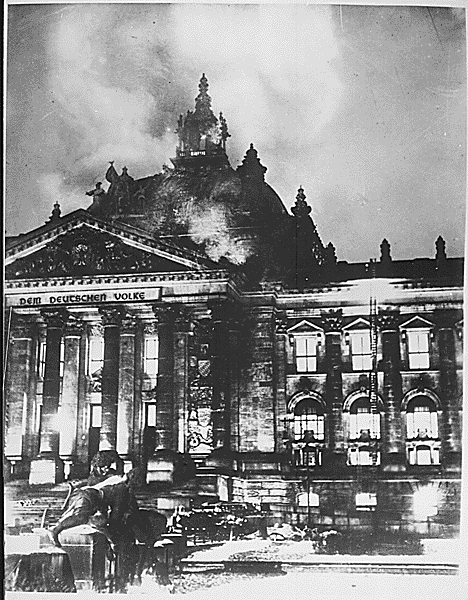
On 27 February 1933, Germany's parliament building in Berlin, the Reichstag, was set on fire.

Events in the year 1933 in Germany.

== Incumbents ==
=== National level ===
- Chancellor:
  - Kurt von Schleicher (until 28 January 1933)
  - Adolf Hitler (from 30 January 1933)
- President: Paul von Hindenburg

== Events in Germany ==
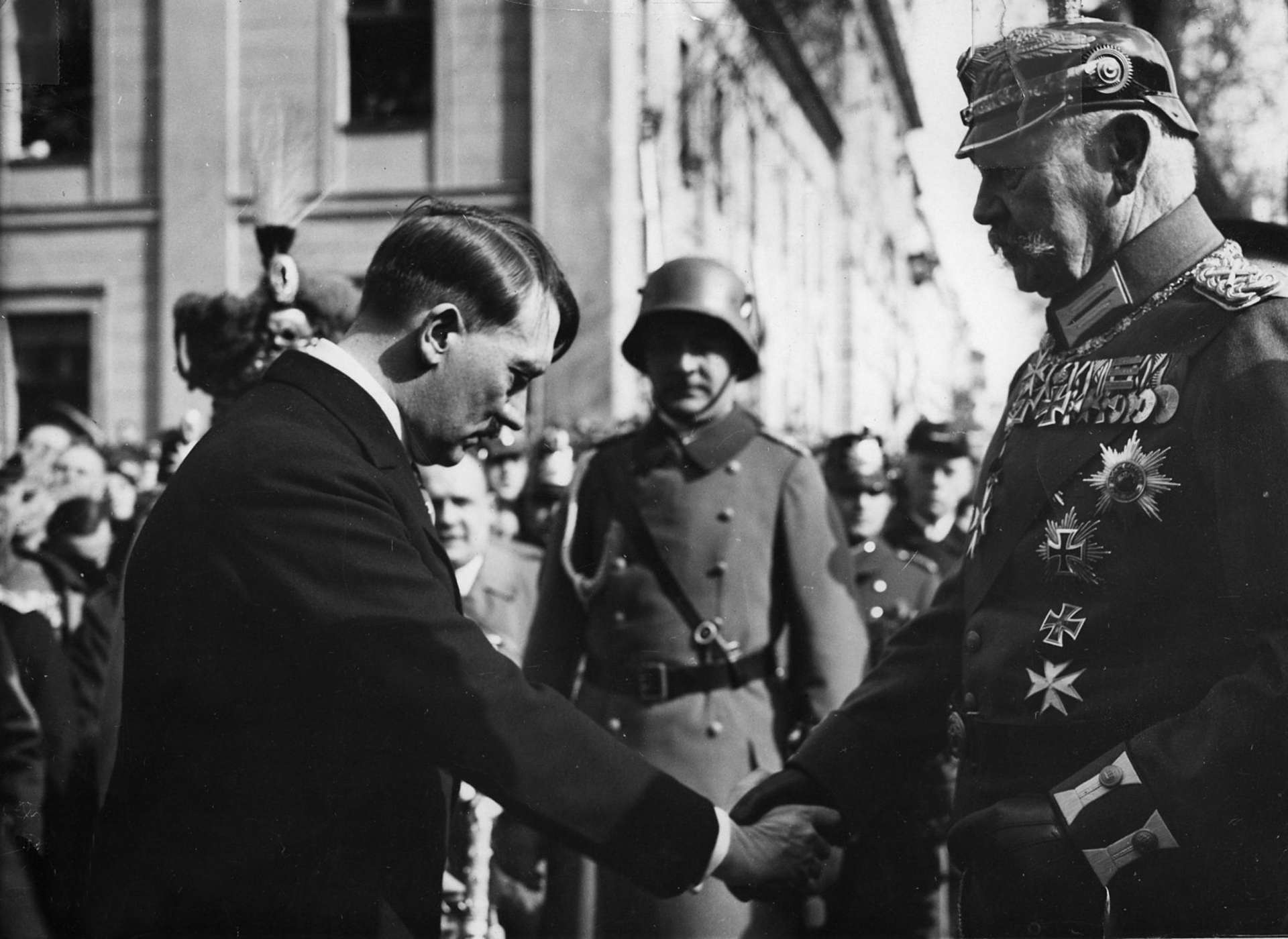
On 21 March, President Paul von Hindenburg met Hitler on "Day of Potsdam".

- 30 January – National Socialist leader Adolf Hitler is appointed Chancellor of Germany by President of Germany Paul von Hindenburg.
- 1 February – Adolf Hitler gives his "Proclamation to the German People" in Berlin.
- 27 February – The Reichstag, Germany's parliament building in Berlin, is set on fire under controversial circumstances.
- 28 February – The Reichstag Fire Decree is passed in response to the Reichstag fire, nullifying many German civil liberties.
- 1 March – Hundreds are arrested as the National Socialists round up their political opponents.
- 5 March – German federal election, March 1933: National Socialists gain 43.9% of the votes.
- 8 March – National Socialists occupy the Bavarian State Parliament and expel deputies.
- 12 March – Hindenburg bans the flag of the republic and orders the Imperial and Nazi flag to fly side by side.
- 15 March – Hitler proclaims the Third Reich.
- 20 March – Dachau, the first Nazi concentration camp, is completed (it opens 22 March).
- 21 March – Jewish organizations announce an economic boycott of German goods.
- 23 March – The Reichstag passes the Enabling Act ("The law for removing the distress of people and the Reich"), making Adolf Hitler dictator of Germany, curbing its own power.

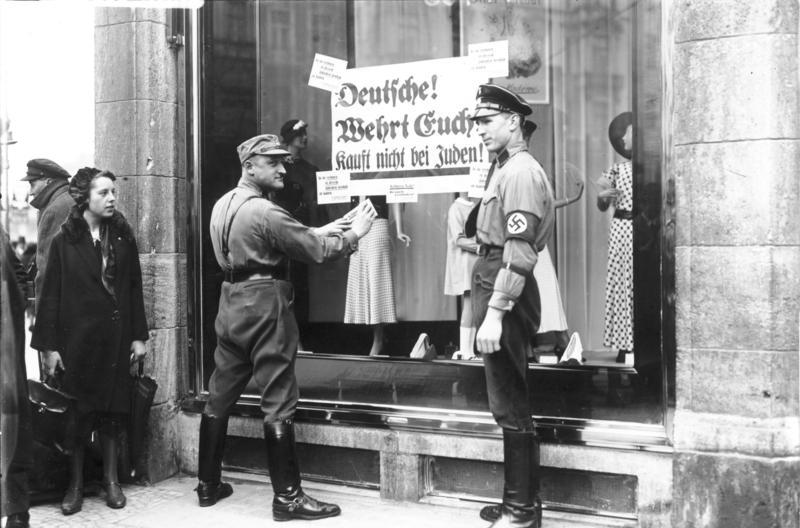
1 April: Nazi soldiers hanging a poster on the window of Jewish-owned business, that says: "German, protect yourself. Do not buy from Jews".

- 1 April – The recently elected National Socialists under Julius Streicher organise a one-day boycott of all Jewish-owned businesses in Germany.
- 7 April – The Law for the Restoration of the Professional Civil Service is passed, forcing all "non-Aryans" to retire from the legal profession and civil service.
- 21 April – Germany outlaws the kosher ritual shechita.
- 26 April – The Gestapo is established in Germany.
- 27 April – Der Stahlhelm veterans organisation joins the Nazi Party.

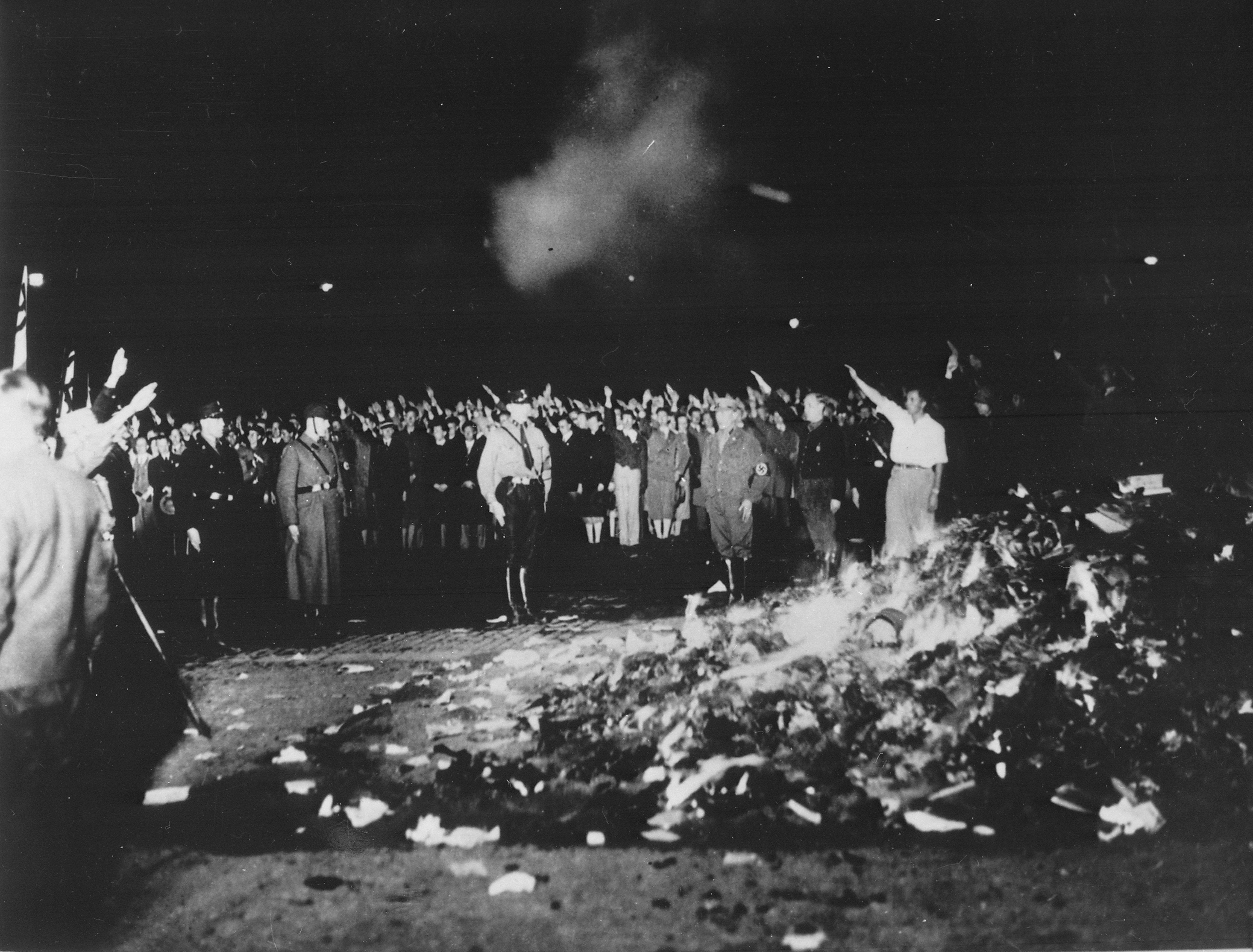
10 May: In Germany, the Nazis stage massive public book burnings.

- 1 May - parades held to celebrate May Day, which had been declared "national workers' day" and a public holiday by the Nazi government. Hitler and Hindenburg attend the parade in Berlin.
- 2 May - all Trade Unions closed down, their headquarters and records were seized, and their leaders attacked and imprisoned.

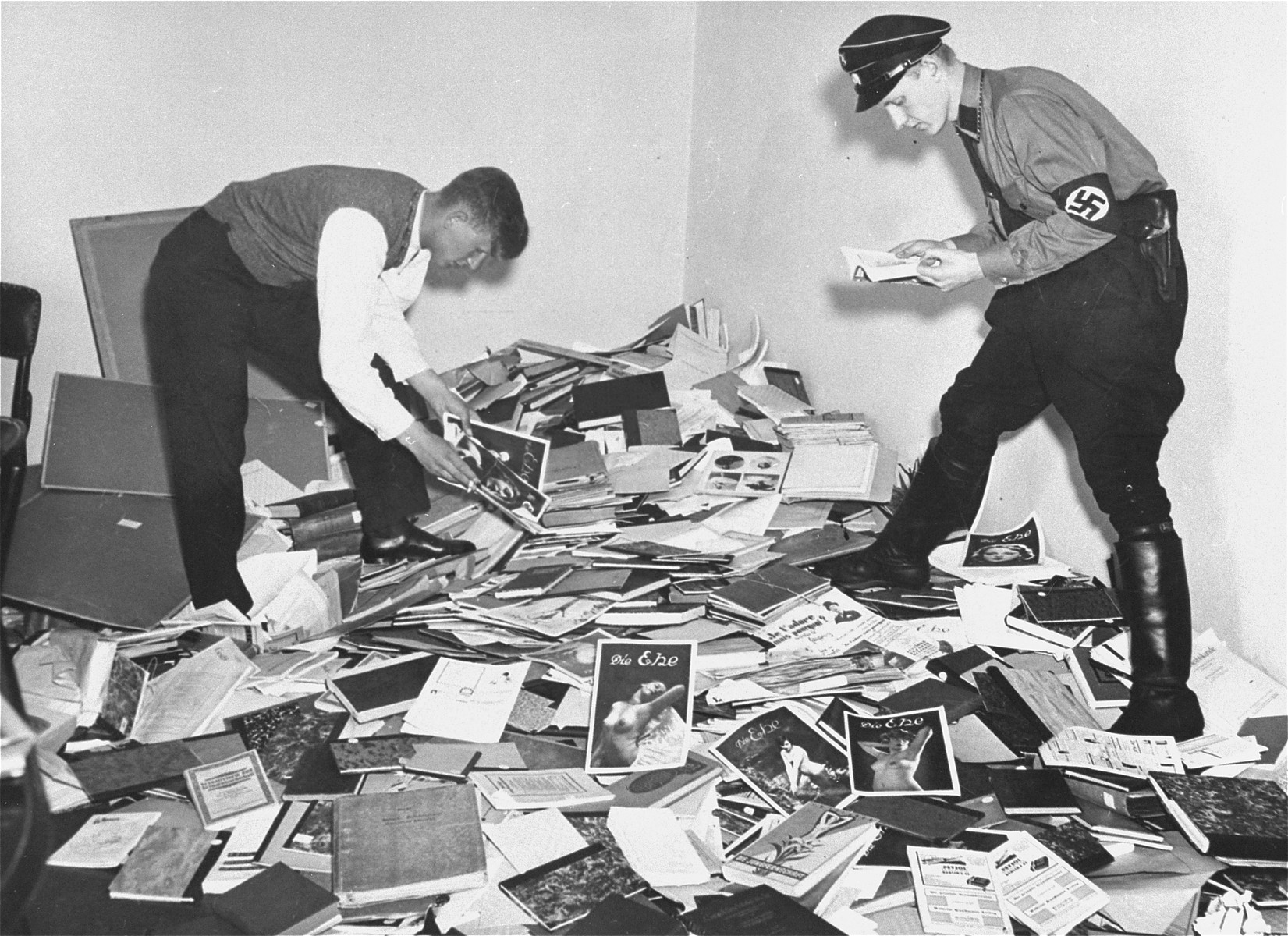
6 May, Nazi raid on the Institut für Sexualwissenschaft.

- 6 May – Nazi raid on the Institut für Sexualwissenschaft
- 10 May – Nazi book burnings are staged publicly throughout Germany.
- 26 May – The Nazi Party introduces a law to legalise eugenic sterilisation.
- 2 June – The Nazi authorities form the 'Expert Committee on Questions of Population and Racial Policy' under Reich Interior Minister Wilhelm Frick.
- 21 June – All non-Nazi political parties are forbidden.
- 25 June – The Wilmersdorfer Tennishallen delegates convene in Berlin to protest against the persecution of Jehovah's Witnesses in Nazi Germany.
- 14 July – Forming new political parties is forbidden. The Law for the Prevention of Hereditarily Diseased Offspring is implemented.
- 20 July – Signing of the Reichskonkordat between the Vatican and Nazi Germany.
- 23 August – The Nazis publish the first of the four lists of people whose German citizenship, passports and other privileges are withdrawn. On the first list of thirty-three names are the Jewish authors Lion Feuchtwanger, Ernst Toller and Kurt Tucholsky.
- 25 August – The Haavara Agreement is signed between Nazi Germany, the Zionist Federation of Germany and the Anglo-Palestine Bank, allowing approximately 60,000 German Jews to leave Germany and move to Palestine.
- 30 August–3 September – The 5th Nazi Party Congress is held in Nuremberg and is called the "Rally of Victory" (Reichsparteitag des Sieges) in reference to the Nazi seizure of power
- 16 October – Germany officially announces its intention to leave the League of Nations.

== Births ==
- 2 January – Günter Jena, German conductor and musicologist (died 2026)
- 7 January – Heinz Aldinger, German football referee (died 2024)
- 3 March – Gerhard Mayer-Vorfelder, German Vice President of the Union of European Football Associations (died 2015)
- 5 March – Walter Kasper, German cardinal of Roman-Catholic Church
- 6 March
  - William Davis, German-born British journalist (died 2019)
  - Willy Schäfer, German actor (died 2011)
- 7 March – Hannelore Kohl, first wife of German Chancellor Helmut Kohl (died 2001)
- 9 March – Reinhard Lettmann, bishop of the Roman Catholic Church (died 2013)
- 14 March – Duke Carl Gregor of Mecklenburg, German nobleman and musician (died 2018)
- 20 March – Michael Pfleghar, German film director and screenwriter (died 1991)
- 7 April – Johannes Schaaf, German film and theatre director (died 2019)
- 14 May – Michael Chevalier, German voice actor (died 2011)
- 15 May – Ursula Schleicher, German politician and harpist
- 29 May – Helmuth Rilling, German choral conductor (died 2026)
- 8 June – Ernst W. Hamburger, German-born Brazilian physicist (died 2018)
- 20 June – Hatto Beyerle, German musician (died 2023)
- 3 July – Maximilian, Margrave of Baden, German nobleman (died 2022)
- 5 July – Michael Heltau, German actor and singer
- 11 July – Ernst Jacobi, German actor (died 2022)
- 14 July – Franz, Duke of Bavaria, German nobleman
- 15 July – Manfred Homberg, German boxer (died 2010)
- 16 July – Heinz Dürr, German entrepreneur (died 2023)
- 21 July – Brigitte Reimann, German novelist (died 1973)
- 6 August – Ulrich Biesinger, German footballer (died 2011)
- 16 August – Reiner Kunze, German writer
- 10 September – Karl Lagerfeld, German fashion designer (died 2019)
- 16 September – Steve Shirley, German-born British businesswoman (died 2025)
- 20 September – Alois Graf von Waldburg-Zeil, German politician (died 2014)
- 3 October – Johannes Beutler, German theologian and Catholic priest (died 2024)
- 14 October – Wilfried Dietrich, German wrestler (died 1992)
- 23 October – Yigal Tumarkin, German-born Israeli painter and sculptor (died 2021)
- 30 October – Johanna von Koczian, German actress (died 2024)
- 6 November – Else Ackermann, German physician, pharmacologist and politician (died 2019)
- 8 November – Lothar Fischer, German sculptor (died 2004)
- 9 November – Renate Ewert, German actress (died 1966)
- 13 November
  - Karl-Otto Alberty, German actor (died 2015)
  - Peter Härtling, German writer, poet, publisher and journalist (died 2017)
- 20 November – Hermann von Richthofen, German diplomat (died 2021)
- 4 December – Horst Buchholz, German actor (died 2003)
- 10 December – Ernst-Ludwig Petrowsky, German jazz musician (died 2023)

== Deaths ==
- 3 January – Wilhelm Cuno, German politician and former Chancellor of Germany (born 1876)
- 1 February – Gustav Lilienthal, German social reformer (born 1849)
- 14 February – Carl Correns, German botanist and geneticist (born 1864)
- 24 February – Johannes Meisenheimer, German zoologist (born 1873)
- 26 February – Princess Thyra of Denmark, Crown Princess of Hanover (born 1853 in Denmark)
- 12 April – Andreas Blunck, German politician (born 1871)
- 24 April – Wilhelm von Schoen, German diplomat (born 1851)
- 27 May – James Loeb, German banker (born 1867)
- 24 July – Max von Schillings, German conductor (born 1868)
- 7 September – Max Adalbert, German actor (born 1874)
- 9 September – Friedrich Fülleborn, German physician who specialized in tropical medicine and parasitology (born 1866)
- 14 September – Theodor Rocholl, German painter (born 1854)
- 11 October – Reinhold Tiling, German engineer (born 1893)
- 19 October – Heinrich Brauns, politician (born 1868)
- 25 October – Friedrich Heinrich Albert Wangerin, German mathematician (born 1844)
- 26 November – Franz Bracht, German politician (born 1877)
- 4 December – Stefan George, German symbolist poet (born 1868)
- 9 December – Julius Falkenstein, German actor (born 1879)

== Modern comparisons ==
The pivotal nature of 1933 in Germany has led to it being a commonly used analogy in modern politics. The 1933 power grab by the Nazi party has been associated with modern political events, particularly the Presidency of Donald Trump in the United States and the 2023 Israeli judicial reform (eventually passed in 2025). Professor Daniel Blatman, a historian of the Holocaust at the Hebrew University of Jerusalem, stated in a February 2023 interview with Haaretz that the situation surrounding the proposed judicial reform at the time, "Really Does Recall Germany in 1933", and referred to the more extreme ministers of the government as "neo-Nazi". Israeli journalists and others repeated or elaborated on Blatman's compassion. In a 2017 essay titled "The Reichstag Fire Next Time: The coming crackdown" Russian-American journalist M. Gessen wrote, "The Reichstag fire, it goes almost without saying, will be a terrorist attack, and it will mark our sudden, obvious, and irreversible descent into autocracy".
