= 1931 in Germany =

- Decades: 1910s; 1920s; 1930s; 1940s; 1950s
- See also: Other events of 1931; History of Germany; Timeline; Years

Events in the year 1931 in Germany.

== Incumbents ==
- President - Paul von Hindenburg (Non-partisan)
- Chancellor - Heinrich Brüning (Centre)

== Events ==
- January 4 – German pilot Elly Beinhorn begins her flight to Portuguese Guinea (now Guinea-Bissau) in Africa.
- February 11 – National Socialist (NSDAP) and National Party (DNVP) members walk out of the Reichstag in protest against changes in the parliament's protocol intended to limit heckling.
- April 22 – Austria, Denmark, Germany, Italy, Sweden, the United Kingdom and the United States recognize the Second Spanish Republic.
- May 8 – Prosecution of Adolf Hitler by Hans Litten for complicity in manslaughter committed by members of the Sturmabteilung at the Tanzpalast Eden ("Eden Dance Palace") in Berlin in 1930 is dismissed.
- June 5 – Chancellor Brüning visits London, where he warns the British Prime Minister Ramsay MacDonald that the collapse of the Austrian banking system, caused by the bankruptcy of the Creditanstalt, has left the entire German banking system on the verge of collapse. Germany suspends payment of World War I reparations and, despite declaration of the Hoover Moratorium, there is massive withdrawal of domestic and foreign funds from German banks, which by mid-July have all closed.
- June 10 – The Schienenzeppelin, an experimental propeller driven railcar, sets up a new world railway speed record of 230 km/h on its way from Hamburg to Berlin which is not surpassed by any other train for 24 years.
- August 9 – Referendum in Prussia for dissolving the Landtag ends with the "yes" side winning 37% of the vote, which is insufficient for calling the early elections. The elections are intended to remove the Social Democratic Party (SPD) government of Otto Braun, which is one of the strongest forces for democracy in Germany. Supporting the "yes" side are the NSDAP, the DNVP and the Communist Party (KPD), while the SPD and Zentrum support the "no" side.
- August 29 – Airship Graf Zeppelin pioneers the air route between Germany and Brazil.
- August – The Deaflympics are held in Nuremberg.
- October 11 – Rally in Bad Harzburg leads to the Harzburg Front being founded, uniting the NSDAP, the DNVP, the Stahlhelm and various other right-wing fractions.
- December 8 – Carl Friedrich Goerdeler is appointed Reich Price Commissioner to enforce the deflationary policies of the Brüning government.

=== Arts and literature ===
- Erich Kästner's satire Der 35. Mai oder Konrad reitet in die Südsee is published.
- Irmgard Keun's first novel Gilgi - eine von uns is published.
- Erich Maria Remarque's war novel Der Weg zurück concludes serialization (January) and is published in book form (March).
- Carl Zuckmayer's satire Der Hauptmann von Köpenick is first performed.
- Fritz Lang's thriller M is released (May 11).
- The film version of Berlin-Alexanderplatz is released.
- The musical film version of Die 3-Groschen-Oper, is released (February 19).
- The film version of Emil und die Detektive is released.

=== Science ===
- 10 September – Ernst Ruska and Max Knoll publish their findings after building the first prototype electron microscope.
- Adolf Butenandt identifies the sex hormone androsterone.
- The first electroencephalography is performed by Hans Berger.
- Nobel Prize in Chemistry awarded to Carl Bosch and Friedrich Bergius; Nobel Prize in Physiology or Medicine awarded to Otto Heinrich Warburg.

== Births ==
- January 8 – Bill Graham (Wulf Wolodia Grajonca), rock concert promoter (d. 1991 in the United States)
- January 16 – Johannes Rau, President of Germany 1999–2004 (d. 2006)
- January 17 – Mark Brandis (Nikolai von Michalewsky), journalist and science fiction author (d. 2000)
- February 2 – Walter Burkert, classical scholar (d. 2015 in Switzerland)
- February 6 – Maria Mies, sociologist and feminist (died 2023)
- February 7 – Holger Börner, politician (died 2006)
- March 3 – Werner Haas, German pianist (died 1976)
- March 11 – Janosch (Horst Eckert), children's book author and illustrator (died 2026)
- April 1 – Rolf Hochhuth, dramatist
- April 29 – Frank Auerbach, painter
- May 19 – Alfred Schmidt, philosopher (d. 2012)
- June 4 – Erasmus Schöfer, writer (died 2022)
- June 8 – Dana Wynter, actress (d. 2011 in the United States)
- June 29 – Ralph Klein, basketball player and coach (d. 2008 in Israel)
- June 30 – Gerda Herrmann, composer and poet (died 2021)
- July 31 – Ivan Rebroff, German singer (died 2008)
- August 20 – Bernd Becher, photographer (d. 2007)
- September 1 – Michael O. Rabin, Israeli computer scientist and Turing Award laureate
- November 6 – Mike Nichols (Mikhail Igor Peschkowsky), director (d. 2014 in the United States)

== Deaths ==
- February 16 – Wilhelm von Gloeden, photographer (b. 1856)
- February 23 – Eduard von Capelle, admiral (b. 1855)
- February 26 – Otto Wallach, chemist, recipient of the Nobel Prize in Chemistry (b. 1847)
- March 11 – F. W. Murnau, film director (b. 1888; d. in United States)
- March 20 – Hermann Müller, German politician (born 1876)
- April 14 – Richard Armstedt, historian (b. 1851)
- May 6 – Hermann Anschütz-Kaempfe, German scientist and inventor (b. 1872)
- September 18 – Geli Raubal, half-niece of Adolf Hitler (b. 1908)
- September 20 – Max Littmann, architect (b. 1862)
- October 17 – Alfons Maria Jakob, neuropathologist (b. 1884)
