= 2007 in German television =

This is a list of German television related events from 2007.

== Events ==
- 8 March - Roger Cicero is selected to represent Germany at the 2007 Eurovision Song Contest with his song "Frauen regier'n die Welt". He is selected to be the fifty-second German Eurovision entry during Wer singt für Deutschland? held at the Deutsches Schauspielhaus in Hamburg.
- 5 May - Mark Medlock wins the fourth season of Deutschland sucht den Superstar.
- 30 June - Gute Zeiten, schlechte Zeiten actress Susan Sideropoulos and her partner Christian Polanc win the second season of Let's Dance.
- 7 July - Michael Carstensen wins the seventh season of Big Brother Germany.
- 3 November - 19-year-old opera singer Ricardo Marinello wins the first season of Das Supertalent.

== Debuts ==
=== Domestic ===
- 8 January - Afrika, mon amour (2007) (ZDF)
- 16 January - 2030 – Aufstand der Alten (2007) (ZDF)
- 20 October - Das Supertalent (2007–present) (RTL)

=== International ===
- 20 January - (United States) Foster's Home for Imaginary Friends (2004–2009) (Super RTL)

== Military Television Debuts ==
=== American Forces Network ===
- 6 March - (United States) Slangman's World (2007–2008)

=== BFBS ===
- (United Kingdom) The Likeaballs (2006)
- (United Kingdom) The Beeps (2007–2008)
- (United Kingdom) Shaun the Sheep (2007–2016, 2020–present)

== Television shows ==
=== 1950s ===
- Tagesschau (1952–present)

=== 1960s ===
- heute (1963-present)

=== 1970s ===
- heute-journal (1978-present)
- Tagesthemen (1978-present)

=== 1980s ===
- Wetten, dass..? (1981-2014)
- Lindenstraße (1985–present)

=== 1990s ===
- Gute Zeiten, schlechte Zeiten (1992–present)
- Marienhof (1992–2011)
- Unter uns (1994-present)
- Verbotene Liebe (1995-2015)
- Schloss Einstein (1998–present)
- In aller Freundschaft (1998–present)
- Wer wird Millionär? (1999-present)

=== 2000s ===
- Big Brother Germany (2000-2011, 2015–present)
- Deutschland sucht den Superstar (2002–present)
- Let's Dance (2006–present)

== Networks and services ==
=== Launches ===
Network	Type	Launch date	Notes	Source
Animax Germany	Cable television	5 June		

=== Closures ===
Network	Type	End date	Notes	Sources
Terranova	Cable television	10 July		
Traumpartner TV	Cable television	31 October		

== See also ==
- 2007 in Germany
