= 1990 in Germany =

- Decades: 1970s; 1980s; 1990s; 2000s; 2010s
- See also: Other events of 1990; History of Germany • Timeline • Years

Events in the year 1990 in the Federal Republic of Germany and East Germany.

The year was highly significant, as German reunification was achieved after four decades of division between East and West, the German national football team won the 1990 FIFA World Cup, and federal elections were held in December.

== Incumbents ==
=== Federal Republic of Germany ===
- President – Richard von Weizsäcker
- Chancellor – Helmut Kohl

=== East Germany (until 2 October) ===
- Head of State
  - Manfred Gerlach (until 5 April 1990)
  - Sabine Bergmann-Pohl (5 April – 2 October 1990)
- Head of Government
  - Hans Modrow (until 12 April 1990)
  - Lothar de Maizière (12 April – 2 October 1990)

== Events ==
- Die Wende

=== January ===
- January 15 – East German demonstrations: Demonstrators in East Berlin stormed the headquarters of Stasi

=== February ===
- February 2 – Rüsselsheim train disaster
- February 9–20 – 40th Berlin International Film Festival

=== March ===
- 18 March – 1990 East German general election
- 29 March – Germany in the Eurovision Song Contest 1990

=== July ===
- 1 July – German reunification: The Deutsche Mark became East Germany's currency with the West, replacing the East German mark
- 8 July – West Germany defeats Argentina 1–0 to win the 1990 FIFA World Cup.
- July: During preparations for Pink Floyds convert in Potsdamer Platz, the Fahrerbunker was discovered.

=== August ===
- 23 August – German reunification: East Germany votes to dissolve its independence and will join with West Germany effective on the 3rd of October
- 31 August – German reunification: West and East Germany signed a unification treaty

=== September ===
- 12 September – German reunification: Treaty on the Final Settlement with Respect to Germany

=== October ===
- 1 October – The first banknotes (100 and 200) of the fourth series of Deutsche Mark enter circulation
- 3 October – German reunification: West and East Germany reunified as a single Germany. Berlin becomes the official capital

=== November ===
- 14 November – German–Polish Border Treaty

=== December ===
- 2 December – 1990 German federal election

== Births ==
- 4 January – Toni Kroos, German footballer
- 28 January – Markus Deibler, German swimmer
- 30 January – Nils Miatke, German footballer
- 18 March – Wilson Gonzalez Ochsenknecht, German actor
- 10 April – Christoph Harting, German athlete specialising in the discus throw
- 14 April – Markus Smarzoch, German footballer
- 21 April – Sebastian Walter, German politician
- 30 April – Michael Schulte, German singer
- 7 May – Sideris Tasiadis, German canoeist
- 12 May – Tobias Strobl, German footballer
- 1 June – Kieren Emery, German-English rower
- 3 June – Fabian Götze, German footballer
- 30 June – Jacob Schrot, German civil servant
- 7 June – Benjamin Woltmann, German footballer
- 14 June – Robert Hering, German sprinter
- 2 July – Roman Lob, German singer
- 4 July – David Kross, German actor
- 21 August – Jana Majunke, German Paralympic cyclist
- 6 November – André Schürrle, German footballer
- 10 November – Kristina Vogel, German cyclist
- 18 November – Kira Walkenhorst, German beach volleyball player

== Deaths ==
- 8 January – Horst Freiherr Treusch von Buttlar-Brandenfels, German general (born 1900)
- 13 March – Karl Münchinger, German conductor (born 1915)
- 20 March – Wilhelm Neef, German composer and conductor (born 1916)
- 28 March – Kurt Scharf, German clergyman and bishop of the Evangelical Church in Berlin-Brandenburg (born 1902)
- 14 April – Martin Kessel, German writer (born 1901)
- 15 April – Helmut Lemke, German politician (born 1907)
- 20 April – Horst Sindermann, German politician (born 1915)
- 5 May – Walter Bruch, German electrical engineer (born 1908)
- 14 June – Erna Berger, coloratura lyric soprano (born 1900)
- 9 July
  - Horst Rittel, German design theorist (born 1930)
  - Friedrich Wegener, German pathologist (born 1907)
- 14 July – Walter Sedlmayr, German actor (born 1926)
- 7 August – Gebhard Müller, German politician (born 1900)
- 23 August – Karl II, 8th Prince of Löwenstein-Wertheim-Rosenberg. German nobleman (born 1904)
- 29 October – Volker von Collande, German actor and film director (born 1913)
- 24 November – Helga Feddersen, German actress, comedian, singer, author, and theater director (born 1930)
- 7 December – Horst Bienek, German economist (born 1930)

== See also ==
- 1990 in German television
