= 2004 in Germany =

- Decades: 1980s; 1990s; 2000s; 2010s; 2020s
- See also: Other events of 2004; History of Germany • Timeline • Years

Events in the year 2004 in Germany.

== Incumbents ==
- President – Johannes Rau (until 30 July), Horst Köhler (starting 30 July)
- Chancellor – Gerhard Schröder

== Events ==
=== February ===
- 5–15 February - 54th Berlin International Film Festival

=== March ===
- 19 March: Germany in the Eurovision Song Contest 2004

=== June ===
- 9 June: 2004 Cologne bombing

=== August ===
- 2 August: Protests against Hartz IV reforms
- 21 August: The Berlin Rules on Water Resources are adopted by the International Law Association.

=== September ===
- 19 September: The Far Right National Democratic Party of Germany (NPD) won 12 seats in the 2004 Saxony state election. This is the first time since the 1960s that the party had seats in a state parliament.

=== December ===
- 26 December: Several thousands of Germans are among thousands of people killed by the 2004 Indian Ocean tsunami.

== Elections ==
- 2004 German presidential election
- 2004 European Parliament election in Germany
- 2004 Brandenburg state election
- 2004 Hamburg state election
- 2004 Saarland state election
- 2004 Saxony state election
- 2004 Thuringian state election

== Sport ==
- 2003–04 Bundesliga
- 2003–04 2. Bundesliga
- 2003–04 Deutsche Eishockey Liga season
- 2004 BMW Open
- 2004 German Grand Prix
- 2004 European Grand Prix
- 2004 German motorcycle Grand Prix

== Births ==
- 15 November — Vincent Keymer, German chess prodigy
- 20 November — Youssoufa Moukoko, German professional footballer.

== Deaths ==
- 6 February - Claus Hinrich Casdorff, German journalist and writer (born 1925)
- 14 May - Günter Gaus, German journalist, commentator and diplomat (born 1929)
- 19 May - Carl Raddatz, German actor (born 1912)
- 24 May - Friedrich Wilhelm Christians, German banker (born 1922)
- 16 June - Ursula Lillig, German actress (born 1938)
- 8 July - Albert Friedlander, German rabbi and teacher (born 1927)
- 10 July - Inge Meysel, German actress (born 1910)
- 22 July - Bodo Hauser, German journalist and writer (born 1946)
- 11 August -Wolfgang Mommsen, German historian (born 1930)
- 19 August - Günter Rexrodt, German politician (born 1941)
- 4 October - Helmut Bantz, German gymnast (born 1921)
- 17 October - Andreas Sassen, football player (born 1968)
- 28 September - Christl Cranz, German alpine racer (born 1914)
- 16 November – Henning Brandis, German physician and microbiologist (born 1916)
- 1 December - Prince Bernhard of Lippe-Biesterfeld, German-born prince who was the consort of Queen Juliana of the Netherlands (born 1911)
- 12 December - Herbert Dreilich, German rock musician (born 1942)
- Unknown - OUBEY, visual artist (born 1958)

== See also ==
- 2004 in German television
