= 2009 in German television =

This is a list of German television related events from 2009.

== Events ==
- 9 May - Daniel Schuhmacher wins the sixth season of Deutschland sucht den Superstar.
- 6 July - Daniel Schöller wins the ninth season of Big Brother Germany.
- 20 December - 30-year-old animal trainer Yvo Antoni and his dog PrimaDonna win the third season of Das Supertalent.

== Debuts ==
=== Free for air ===
==== Domestic ====
- 5 January - Savvy Lena (2009) (ZDF)
- 14 January - Countdown – Die Jagd beginnt (2009–2011) (RTL)
- 29 January - Die Wölfe (2009) (ZDF)
- 22 March - Krupp: A Family Between War and Peace (2009) (ZDF)
- 18 June - Lasko – Die Faust Gottes (2009–2010) (RTL)

==== International ====
- 16 September - (United States) Lipstick Jungle (2008-2009) (ProSieben)

=== Cable ===
==== International ====
- 16 November - (India) / (Portugal) / (Spain) Sandra the Fairytale Detective (2009-2010) (Disney Channel)

=== BFBS ===
- (United Kingdom) The Pinky and Perky Show (2008-2009)

== Television shows ==
=== 1950s ===
- Tagesschau (1952–present)

=== 1960s ===
- heute (1963–present)

=== 1970s ===
- heute-journal (1978–present)
- Tagesthemen (1978–present)

=== 1980s ===
- Wetten, dass..? (1981-2014)
- Lindenstraße (1985–present)

=== 1990s ===
- Gute Zeiten, schlechte Zeiten (1992–present)
- Marienhof (1992–2011)
- Unter uns (1994–present)
- Verbotene Liebe (1995-2015)
- Schloss Einstein (1998–present)
- In aller Freundschaft (1998–present)
- Wer wird Millionär? (1999–present)

=== 2000s ===
- Big Brother Germany (2000-2011, 2015–present)
- Deutschland sucht den Superstar (2002–present)
- Let's Dance (2006–present)
- Das Supertalent (2007–present)

== Networks and services ==
=== Launches ===
Network	Type	Launch date	Notes	Source
TNTSerie	Cable television	28 January		
ZDFneo	Cable and satellite	1 November		

=== Conversions and rebrandings ===
Old network name	New network name	Type	Conversion Date	Notes	Source
RTL Shop	Channel 21	Cable television	1 January		
History Channel	History	Cable television	11 January		
Premiere Krimi	Sky Krimi	Cable television	4 July		
Turner Classic Movies	TNT Film	Cable television	4 July		

=== Closures ===
Network	Type	End date	Notes	Sources
Fernsehen aus Berlin	Cable television	1 April		
Discovery Geschichte	Cable television	16 May		
Hit24	Cable television	1 July		
ZDFdokukanal	Cable television	31 October		

== See also ==
- 2009 in Germany
