= 2006 in Germany =

- Decades: 1980s; 1990s; 2000s; 2010s; 2020s
- See also: Other events of 2006; History of Germany • Timeline • Years

Events in the year 2006 in Germany.

== Incumbents ==
=== Federal level ===
- President: Horst Köhler
- Chancellor: Angela Merkel

=== State level ===
- Minister-President of Baden-Württemberg: Günther Oettinger
- Minister-President of Bavaria: Edmund Stoiber
- Governing mayor of Berlin: Klaus Wowereit
- First mayor of Bremen: Jens Böhrnsen
- Minister-President of Brandenburg: Matthias Platzeck
- First mayor of Hamburg: Ole von Beust
- Minister-President of Hesse: Roland Koch
- Minister-President of Lower Saxony: Christian Wulff
- Minister-President of Mecklenburg-Vorpommern: Harald Ringstorff
- Minister-President of North Rhine-Westphalia: Jürgen Rüttgers
- Minister-President of Rhineland-Palatinate: Kurt Beck
- Minister-President of the Saarland: Peter Müller
- Minister-President of Saxony: Georg Milbradt
- Minister-President of Saxony-Anhalt: Wolfgang Böhmer
- Minister-President of Schleswig-Holstein: Peter Harry Carstensen
- Minister-President of Thuringia: Dieter Althaus

== Events ==
- 2 January - Bad Reichenhall Ice Rink roof collapse
- 9 February - Bundesvision Song Contest 2006
- 9–19 February - 56th Berlin International Film Festival
- February - April - 2006 European floods
- 9 March - Germany in the Eurovision Song Contest 2006
- 26 May - Berlin Hauptbahnhof opened
- June 9 to July 9 – The 2006 FIFA World Cup takes place in Germany; Italy defeats France in the final.
- 26 June - Murder of Frauke Liebs
- 31 July - 2006 German train bombing plot
- 22 September - Lathen train collision
- 26 September - 2006 Idomeneo controversy at Deutsche Oper Berlin
- 26 September – 1 October – photokina in Cologne
- 20 November - Emsdetten school shooting
- October - 2006 German troops controversy

== Sport ==
- 2006 FIFA World Cup
- Germany at the 2006 Winter Olympics
- 2005–06 Bundesliga
- 2005–06 2. Bundesliga
- 2005–06 DEL season
- 2006 German Grand Prix
- 2006 European Grand Prix
- 2006 German motorcycle Grand Prix

== Elections ==
- Baden-Württemberg state election
- Berlin state election
- Mecklenburg-Vorpommern state election
- Rhineland-Palatinate state election
- Saxony-Anhalt state election

== Deaths ==
- 27 January - Johannes Rau, politician (born 1931)
- 3 February - Reinhart Koselleck, German historian (born 1923)
- 30 April - Paul Spiegel, President of Central Council of Jews in Germany (born 1937)
- 4 May - Fritz Schenk, broadcast journalist (born 1930)
- 9 June - Drafi Deutscher, German singer (born 1946)
- 10 June - Wulff-Dieter Heintz, German astronomer (born 1930)
- 27 July - Elisabeth Volkmann, German actress (born 1936)
- 2 August - Holger Börner, politician (born 1931)
- 26 August - Rainer Barzel, politician (born 1924)
- 26 August - Ulrich de Maizière, general (born 1912)
- 7 September - Andreas Meyer-Hanno, German theater and opera director (born 1932)
- 18 September -Heinrich Trettner, general (born 1907)
- 1 October - Frank Beyer, German film director (born 1932)
- 5 October - Friedrich Karl Flick, German industrialist and billionaire (born 1927)
- 6 October - Heinz Sielmann, German zoologist, biologist and filmmaker (born 1917)
- 20 October - Maxi Herber, German figure skater (born 1920)
- 9 November -Ingrid Hartmann, German sprint canoer (born 1930)
- 10 May- Robert Alvarez Lee ii, WW ii Veteran (born 1926)

== See also ==
- 2006 in German television
