= 2005 in German television =

This is a list of German television related events from 2005.

== Events ==
- 1 March - Sascha Sirtl wins the fifth season of Big Brother Germany.
- 7 March - Deutschland sucht den Superstar season 1 participant Gracia Baur is selected to represent Germany at the 2005 Eurovision Song Contest with her song "Run & Hide". She is selected to be the fiftieth German Eurovision entry during Germany 12 Points! held at the Arena Berlin in Berlin.

== Debuts ==
=== Domestic ===
- 3 January - Die Patriarchin (2005) (ZDF)
- 9 May - Speer und Er (2005) (ARD)

=== International ===
- 12 March - (United States) Two and a Half Men (2003-2015) (Prosieben, ORF 1)
- 15 August - (United Kingdom) Gordon the Garden Gnome (2005–2006) (KiKA)
- 3 September - (United States) X-Men: Evolution (2000–2003) (Kabel eins)
- 21 November - (Canada) Being Ian (2005–2008) (KiKA)

=== BFBS ===
- 17 February - (Canada) / (France) Atomic Betty (2004–2008)
- (United Kingdom) Diamond Geezer (2005–2007)
- (United Kingdom) King Arthur's Disasters (2005–2006)
- (United Kingdom) The Secret of Eel Island (2005)

== Television shows ==
=== 1950s ===
- Tagesschau (1952–present)

=== 1960s ===
- heute (1963–present)

=== 1970s ===
- heute-journal (1978–present)
- Tagesthemen (1978–present)

=== 1980s ===
- Wetten, dass..? (1981-2014)
- Lindenstraße (1985–present)

=== 1990s ===
- Gute Zeiten, schlechte Zeiten (1992–present)
- Marienhof (1992–2011)
- Unter uns (1994–present)
- Verbotene Liebe (1995-2015)
- Schloss Einstein (1998–present)
- In aller Freundschaft (1998–present)
- Wer wird Millionär? (1999–present)

=== 2000s ===
- Big Brother Germany (2000-2011, 2015–present)
- Deutschland sucht den Superstar (2002–present)

== Networks and services ==
=== Launches ===
| Network | Type | Launch date | Notes | Source |
|---|---|---|---|---|
| Radio Bremen TV | Cable television | 1 January | | |
| Eurosport 2 | Cable television | 10 January | | |
| Discovery Geschichte | Cable television | 31 March | | |
| Deluxe Music | Cable television | 1 April | | |
| Focus Gesundheit | Cable television | 1 June | | |
| MTV2 Pop | Cable television | 11 September | | |
| Das Vierte | Cable television | 29 September | | |
| center.tv | Cable television | October | | |
| GIGA Television | Cable television | Unknown | | |

=== Conversions and rebrandings ===
| Old network name | New network name | Type | Conversion Date | Notes | Source |
|---|---|---|---|---|---|
| Kabel 1 | kabel eins | Cable television | Unknown | | |
| EinsMuXx | EinsPlus | Cable television | 23 April | | |

=== Closures ===
| Network | Type | End date | Notes | Sources |
|---|---|---|---|---|
| NBC Europe | Cable television | 29 September | | |

== See also ==
- 2005 in Germany
