= 2006 in German television =

This is a list of German television related events from 2006.

== Events ==
- 26 February - Michael Knopf wins the sixth season of Big Brother Germany.
- 9 March - Texas Lightning are selected to represent Germany at the 2006 Eurovision Song Contest with their song "No No Never". They are selected to be the fifty-first German Eurovision entry during Der deutsche Vorentscheid 2006 – 50 Jahre Grand Prix held at the Deutsches Schauspielhaus in Hamburg.
- 18 March - Tobias Regner wins the third season of Deutschland sucht den Superstar.
- 21 May - Unser Charly actor Wayne Carpendale and his partner Isabel Edvardsson win the first season of Let's Dance.

== Debuts ==
=== Domestic ===
- 3 April - Let's Dance (2006–present) (RTL)
- 29 October - Blackout – Die Erinnerung ist tödlich (2006) (Sat.1)

=== International ===
- 10 February - (United States) Pet Alien (2005) (KiKA)
- 3 May - (United States) American Dad! (2005–present) (MTV)
- 8 May - (United Kingdom) Postman Pat (1981, 1991, 1994, 1996, 2004–2008) (ORF 1)
- 19 October - (United States) Bones (2005–2017) (RTL)

== Military Television Debuts ==
=== BFBS ===
- (United Kingdom) Muffin the Mule (2005)

== Television shows ==
=== 1950s ===
- Tagesschau (1952–present)

=== 1960s ===
- heute (1963–present)

=== 1970s ===
- heute-journal (1978–present)
- Tagesthemen (1978–present)

=== 1980s ===
- Wetten, dass..? (1981-2014)
- Lindenstraße (1985–present)

=== 1990s ===
- Gute Zeiten, schlechte Zeiten (1992–present)
- Marienhof (1992–2011)
- Unter uns (1994–present)
- Verbotene Liebe (1995-2015)
- Schloss Einstein (1998–present)
- In aller Freundschaft (1998–present)
- Wer wird Millionär? (1999–present)

=== 2000s ===
- Big Brother Germany (2000-2011, 2015–present)
- Deutschland sucht den Superstar (2002–present)

== Networks and services ==
=== Launches ===
Network	Type	Launch date	Notes	Source
Boomerang	Cable television	1 June		
kabel eins classics	Cable television	1 June		
Sat.1 Comedy	Cable television	1 June		
DMAX	Cable television	1 September		
RTL Crime	Cable television	27 November		
RTL Living	Cable television	27 November		
Passion	Cable television	27 November		
Turner Classic Movies	Cable television	4 December		
Cartoonito	Cable television	12 October		
Cartoon Network	Cable television	5 December		

=== Conversions and rebrandings ===
Old network name	New network name	Type	Conversion Date	Notes	Source
XXP	DMAX	Cable television	1 September		
Premiere 5	Premiere Filmclassics	Cable television	Unknown		
Premiere 6	Premiere Filmfest	Cable television	Unknown		

=== Closures ===
Network	Type	End date	Notes	Sources
Premiere 4	Cable television	Unknown		
Premiere 7	Cable television	Unknown		

== See also ==
- 2006 in Germany
