= 1929 in Germany =

- Decades: 1900s; 1910s; 1920s; 1930s; 1940s
- See also: Other events of 1929; History of Germany • Timeline • Years

Events in the year 1929 in Germany.

== Incumbents ==
=== National level ===
- President – Paul von Hindenburg (Non-partisan)
- Chancellor – Hermann Müller (Social Democrats)

== Events ==
- 8–29 August – Rigid airship LZ 127 Graf Zeppelin makes a circumnavigation of the Northern Hemisphere eastabout out of Lakehurst, New Jersey, including the first nonstop flight of any kind across the Pacific Ocean (Tokyo–Los Angeles).
- 31 August – The Young Plan for settling German World War I reparations is finalized.
- October – The Wall Street crash of 1929 marks a major turning point in Germany: following prosperity under the government of the Weimar Republic, foreign investors withdraw their German interests, beginning the crumbling of the Republican government in favor of Nazism. The number of unemployed reaches three million.
- Alfred Döblin's modernist novel Berlin Alexanderplatz is published.
- Erich Maria Remarque's All Quiet on the Western Front (Im Westen nichts Neues) is first published in book format
- German car company Opel is taken over by American company General Motors. General Motors assumed full control in 1931.
- Date unknown – Clinical application of cardiac catheterization begins with German physician Werner Forssmann in 1929, who inserted a catheter into the vein of his own forearm, guided it fluoroscopically into his right atrium, and took an X-ray picture of it.
- Date unknown – Styrene-butadiene was developed by German chemist Walter Bock.
- Date unknown: Steroid hormone Estrogen was isolated and purified estrone, the first estrogen to be discovered by Adolf Butenandt
- Date unknown: Rudolf Hell receives a patent for the Hellschreiber, an early fax machine.

== Births ==
- 3 January – Ernst Mahle, German-Brazilian composer and orchestra conductor (died 2025)
- 4 January – Günter Schabowski, German official of the Socialist Unity Party of Germany (SED) (died 2015)
- 5 January – Walter Brandmüller, German cardinal of Roman Catholic Church
- 9 January – Heiner Müller, German dramatist (died 1995)
- 22 January – Fritz Lobinger, German Roman Catholic prelate (died 2025 in South Africa)
- 29 January – John Polanyi, German-born Hungarian-Canadian chemist, Nobel laureate
- 31 January – Rudolf Mössbauer, nuclear physicist, Nobel laureate (died 2011)
- 4 February – Eduard Zimmermann, German journalist (died 2009)
- 18 February – Günther Schramm, German actor
- 22 February - Anny Schlemm, German opera singer (died 2026)
- 25 February - Irmgard Oepen, German physician and medical journalist (died 2018)
- 9 March – Werner Grossmann, East German deputy leader of the Ministry for State Security (died 2022)
- 18 March – Christa Wolf, literary critic, novelist, and essayist (died 2011)
- 30 March -Peter Kuiper, German (died 2007)
- 2 April – Hans Koschnick, German politician (died 2016)
- 3 April – Klaus Hemmerle, German bishop of Roman Catholic Church (died 1994)
- 8 April – Hans Korte, German actor (died 2016)
- 17 April – James Last, born Hans Last, bandleader (died 2015 in the United States)
- 29 April – Walter Kempowski, German writer (died 2007)
- 30 April – Klausjürgen Wussow, German actor (died 2007)
- 1 May – Ralf Dahrendorf, sociologist and political scientist (died 2009)
- 8 May – Günther Wyschofsky, East German politician
- 10 May – Gerhard Müller, German Lutheran theologian (died 2024)
- 15 May – Willi Gundlach, German choral conductor and musicologist (died 2025)
- 16 May – Friedrich Nowottny, German journalist
- 20 May – Pedro Trebbau, German-born Venezuelan zoologist (died 2021)
- 26 May – Alfred Kunz, German-Canadian composer (died 2019)
- 4 June – Günter Strack, actor (died 1999)
- 10 June – Harald Juhnke, comedian (died 2005)
- 12 June
  - Anne Frank, born Annelies Frank, Jewish diarist (died 1945 in Bergen-Belsen concentration camp)
  - Eva Pflug, actress (died 2008)
- 18 June
  - Jörg Faerber, conductor (died 2022)
  - Jürgen Habermas, philosopher (died 2026)
- 29 June – Eberhard Jäckel, historian (died 2017)
- 30 June – Othmar Mága, German conductor (died 2020)
- 22 July – Percy Borucki, German fencer
- 2 August – Gisela Bleibtreu-Ehrenberg, German sociologist, ethnologist, sexologist (died 2025)
- 16 August – Helmut Rahn, German footballer (died 2003)
- 20 August – Lorenz Weinrich, German historian (died 2025)
- 8 September – Christoph von Dohnányi, German conductor (died 2025)
- 9 September – Ruth Pfau, German physician (died 2017)
- 14 September – Hans Clarin, German actor (died 2005)
- 19 September – Heiner Carow, German film director and screenwriter (died 1997)
- 20 September – Hans von Borsody (died 2013)
- 29 September – Rolf Kühn, German clarinetist and saxophonist (died 2022).
- 20 October – Saschko Gawriloff, German violinist
- 25 October – Peter Rühmkorf, writer (died 2008)
- 11 November – Hans Magnus Enzensberger, German writer (died 2022)
- 12 November – Michael Ende, writer (died 1995)
- 23 November
  - Günter Gaus, German journalist, commentator and diplomat (died 2004)
  - Sigrid Kehl, German opera singer (died 2024)
- 27 November – Hans-Reinhard Koch, German Roman Catholic prelate (died 2018)
- 29 November – Xaver Unsinn ice hockey player (died 2012)
- 1 December – Karl Otto Pöhl, economist (died 2014)
- 14 December – Kurt Wünsche, politician (died 2023)

== Deaths ==
- 28 January – Hans von Plessen, general (born 1841)
- 29 January – Hans Prutz, historian (born 1843)
- 1 March
  - Wilhelm von Bode, German art historian (born 1845)
  - Ernst Oppler, painter (born 1867)
- 4 April – Karl Benz, automotive pioneer (born 1844)
- 20 April – Prince Henry of Prussia, German nobleman and naval officer (born 1862)
- 13 May – Arthur Scherbius, German electrical engineer (born 1878)
- 18 June – Hermann Wagner, geographer (born 1840)
- 13 May – Arthur Scherbius, electrical engineer, mathematician, cryptanalyst and inventor (born 1878)
- 22 June – Alfred Brunswig, philosopher (born 1877)
- 5 July – Hans Meyer, geologist (born 1858)
- 14 July – Hans Delbrück, historian (born 1848)
- 15 July – Hugo von Hofmannsthal, poet, dramatist and novelist (born 1874)
- 3 October – Gustav Stresemann, Chancellor 1923, Foreign Minister 1923–29, Nobel laureate (born 1878)
- 8 October – Max Lehmann, historian (born 1845)
- 26 October – Aby Warburg, art historian (born 1866)
- 28 October – Bernhard von Bülow, Chancellor 1900-09 (born 1849)
- 4 November – Karl von den Steinen, German explorer and physician (born 1855)
- 6 November – Prince Maximilian of Baden, Chancellor October–November 1918 (born 1867)
- 10 December – Franz Rosenzweig, theologian and philosopher (born 1886)
- 29 December – Wilhelm Maybach, automobile designer (born 1846)
