= 1937 in Germany =

- Decades: 1910s; 1920s; 1930s; 1940s; 1950s
- See also: Other events of 1937; History of Germany • Timeline • Years

Events in the year 1937 in Germany.

== Incumbents ==
=== National level ===
Head of State and Chancellor

- Adolf Hitler (the Führer) (Nazi Party)

== Events ==
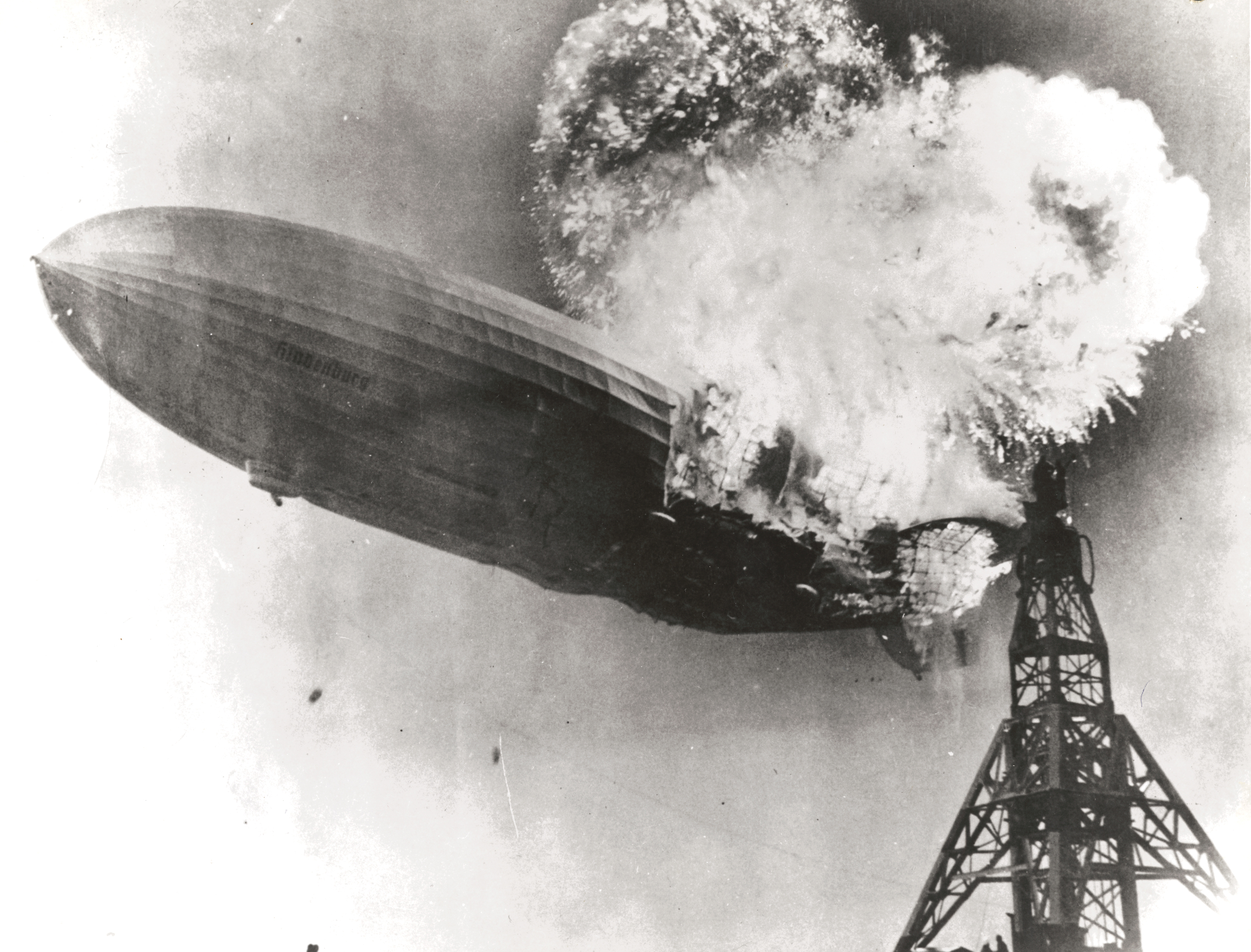
May 6: Hindenburg disaster

- 10 March — The Encyclical Mit brennender Sorge of Pope Pius XI is published in Nazi Germany.
- 6 May — Hindenburg disaster: In the United States, the German airship Hindenburg bursts into flame when mooring to a mast in Lakehurst, New Jersey. Thirteen passengers, 22 crew and one member of the ground crew were killed.
- 7 May — Spanish Civil War: The German Condor Legion Fighter Group, equipped with Heinkel He 51 biplanes, arrives in Spain to assist Francisco Franco's forces.
- 28 May — Volkswagen, state-owned carmaker, is formed to produce the new people's car.
- 8 June — Carl Orff's Carmina Burana premieres in Frankfurt, Germany.
- 15 July — Buchenwald Concentration Camp opened
- 18 July - Haus der Kunst in Munich opened
- 20 July — The Geibeltbad Pirna is opened in Dresden, Germany.
- 6–13 September — The 9th Nazi Party Congress is held and titled the "Rally of Labour" (Reichsparteitag der Arbeit) to highlight the reduction of unemployment in Germany since the Nazi rise to power.
- 25 September–30 September — Italian leader Benito Mussolini makes a state visit to Germany, meeting Hitler in Munich and Berlin, touring several cities, and attending a military parade in the capital; the visit was widely staged as a symbol of the strengthening Rome–Berlin Axis.
- 13 October — Germany, in a note to Brussels, guarantees the inviolability and integrity of Belgium so long as the latter abstains from military action against Germany
- 5 November — In the Reich Chancellery, Adolf Hitler holds a secret meeting and states his plans for acquiring "living space" for the German people (recorded in the Hossbach Memorandum)
- 16 November — Sabena OO-AUB Ostend crash
- Date unknown — Otto Bayer and his coworkers at IG Farben in Leverkusen first made polyurethanes.
- Date unknown — The opioid Methadone is synthesized in Germany by scientists Max Bockmühl and Gustav Ehrhart.
- Date unknown — Konrad Zuse submits patents in Germany based on his Z1 computer design anticipating von Neumann architecture.

== Births ==
- 2 January — Martin Lauer, German sprinter (died 2019)
- 15 January — Walter Stöhrer, German painter (died 2000)
- 31 January — Hans Dresig, Professor for Applied mechanics and Theory of Mechanisms and Machines (died 2018)
- 2 February — Lea Ackermann, German nun and activist (died 2023)
- 7 February — Doris Gercke, German writer (died 2025)
- 8 February — Manfred Krug, German actor (died 2016)
- 9 February — Hildegard Behrens, German operatic soprano (died 2009 in Japan)
- 13 February — Sigmund Jähn, German cosmonaut and pilot (died 2019)
- 17 February — Rita Süssmuth, German politician (CDU) (died 2026)
- 20 February — Robert Huber, German biochemist and Nobel laureate
- 22 February — Rolf Schafstall, German footballer (died 2018)
- 27 February – Peter Hamm, German poet, author, journalist, editor and literary critic (died 2019)
- 18 March — Rudi Altig, German cyclist (died 2016)
- 19 March — Egon Krenz, German politician
- 20 March — Helmut Recknagel, German ski jumper
- 22 March
  - Armin Hary, German sprinter
  - Peter Vogel, German film actor (died 1978 in Austria)
- 2 April — Alexandra Kluge, German actress (died 2017)
- 3 April — Annekathrin Bürger, German actress
- 12 April — Barbara Aland, German theologian (died 2024)
- 24 April — Otmar Gutmann, German TV producer, animator and director (died 1993)
- 25 April — Wolfgang Zapf, German sociologe (died 2018)
- 2 May – Gisela Elsner, German writer (died 1992)
- 3 May – Hans Cieslarczyk, German football player (died 2020)
- 23 May — Rupert Scholz, German politician
- 29 May — Alwin Schockemöhle, German equestrian
- 2 June — Klaus-Michael Kühne, German businessman (died 2026)
- 7 June — Claus Peymann, German theatre director and manager (died 2025)
- 9 June — Harald Rosenthal, German fisheries scientist
- 14 June — Hans-Ulrich Klose, German politician (died 2023)
- 15 June — Rolf Riehm, German composer (died 2026)
- 24 June — Hans Tiedge, German spy (died 2011)
- 25 June — Karin Graßhof, German judge (died 2025)
- 1 July – Claus-Wilhelm Canaris, German jurist (died 2021)
- 4 July – Wolf von Lojewski, German television journalist
- 5 July — Anke Fuchs, German politician (died 2019)
- 7 July — Konrad Wirnhier, German sport shooter (died 2002)
- 12 July - Helga Mees, German fencer (died 2014)
- 11 August — Dieter Kemper, German cyclist (died 2018)
- 16 August — Gerhard Pohl, German politician (died 2012)
- 20 August — Georg Thoma, German skier
- 31 August — Gunter Hampel, German jazz musician (died 2026)
- 1 September - Peter Gaehtgens, German physiologist
- 7 September - Birgit Breuel, German politician
- 27 September - Franz Grundheber, German operatic baritone (died 2025)
- 1 October — Everhardt Franßen, German judge
- 13 October — Rudolf Seiters, German politician
- 27 October — Peter Lustig, German television presenter and author of children's books (died 2016)
- 26 July – Peter Fleischmann, German film director (died 2021)
- 29 October — Michael Ponti, German pianist (died 2022)
- 1 November
  - Jürgen Echternach, German politician (died 2006)
  - Witta Pohl, German actress (died 2011)
- 3 November — Rolf-Ernst Breuer, German businessman (died 2024)
- 11 November – Marlene Schmidt, German actress and beauty queen
- 16 November – Lothar Späth, German politician (died 2016)
- 20 November - René Kollo, German tenor
- 23 November - Karl Mildenberger, German boxer (died 2018)
- 26 November - Bruno Steinhoff, German businessman
- 29 November - Jo Brauner, German journalist
- 20 December - Manfred Lahnstein, German politician
- 29 December — Dieter Thomas Heck, German actor (died 2018)
- 31 December - Paul Spiegel, President of Central Council of Jews in Germany (died 2006)

== Deaths ==
- 4 January – Paul Behncke, German admiral (born 1869)
- 11 February – Adolf Gaston Eugen Fick, German ophthalmologist (born 1852)
- 12 March — Julius Geppert, German pharmacologist (born 1856)
- 18 March — Felix Graf von Bothmer, German general (born 1852)
- 18 April – Max von Gallwitz, German general (born 1852)
- 4 May – Selma Lohse, German politician (born 1883)
- 7 May – Ernst A. Lehmann, German captain of the Hindenburg (b. 1886)
- 14 July – Walter Simons, German diplomat (born 1861)
- 30 July - Hans von Rosenberg, German diplomat and politician (born 1874)
- 29 September – Ernst Hoppenberg, German swimmer (born 1878)
- 7 October - Renate Müller, German actress and singer (born 1906)
- 9 October - Ernest Louis, Grand Duke of Hesse (born 1868)
- 10 October – Walter Gronostay, German composer (born 1906)
- 27 November — Wilhelm Weinberg, German physician and geneticist (born 1862)
- 12 December - Alfred Abel, German actor (born 1879)
- 20 December - Erich Ludendorff, German general (born 1865)
