= 1934 in Germany =

- Decades: 1910s; 1920s; 1930s; 1940s; 1950s
- See also: Other events of 1934; History of Germany • Timeline • Years

Events in the year 1934 in Germany.

== Incumbents ==
=== National level ===
Head of State

- President:
  - Paul von Hindenburg (until 2 August 1934)
  - Adolf Hitler (from 2 August 1934; as Führer and Chancellor)
- Chancellor:
  - Adolf Hitler (Nazi Party)

== Events ==
- 1 January — Germany passes the "Law for the Prevention of Hereditarily Diseased Offspring".
- 10 January — Marinus van der Lubbe is executed in Germany.
- 26 January — The 10 year German-Polish Non-Aggression Pact is signed by Germany and the Second Polish Republic.
- 20 March — All the police forces in Germany come under the command of Heinrich Himmler.
- 29 May-31 May — The Confessional Synod of the German Evangelical Church meets in Barmen, Germany to write the Barmen Declaration.
- 30 June —
  - The Nazi SA camp Oranienburg becomes a national camp, taken over by the SS.
  - Night of the Long Knives: Nazis purge the SA.
- 10 July — German Social Democrat and author Erich Mühsam is killed in Oranienburg concentration camp.
- 2 August — President Paul von Hindenburg dies and Adolf Hitler declares himself Führer of Germany, becoming head of state as well as Chancellor.
- 19 August — German voters retroactively endorse Hitler's assumption of the powers of head of state in a referendum, with 89.9% in favor; Hitler effectively becomes the absolute dictator of Germany.
- 5–10 September — The 6th Nazi Party Congress is held in Nuremberg, attended by about 700,000 Nazi Party supporters and the Leni Riefenstahl film Triumph des Willens is made at this rally.

== Births ==
- 1 January - Hans Huber, German boxer
- 4 January - Hellmuth Karasek, German journalist, literary critic, novelist and author (died 2015)
- 29 January - Paul Gutama Soegijo, German musician and composer (died 2019)
- 8 March - Kurt Mahr, German author (died 1993)
- 10 March - Gustav Gunsenheimer, German composer and music director (died 2026)
- 20 March - Peter Berling, German actor (died 2017)
- 27 March
  - Jutta Limbach, German politician and jurist (died 2016)
  - Peter Schamoni, German film director (died 2011)
- 28 March - Siegfried Thiele, German composer (died 2024)
- 1 April - Elmar Faber, German book publisher (died 2017)
- 5 April - Roman Herzog, German politician, President of Germany (died 2017)
- 13 April - Siegfried Matthus, German composer (died 2021)
- 27 April - Jürgen Kühling, German judge (died 2019)
- 5 May - Alfred Freiherr von Oppenheim, German banker (died 2005)
- 6 May - Oskar Gottlieb Blarr, German composer
- 26 May - Klaus König, German operatic tenor (died 2025)
- 27 May - Uwe Friedrichsen, German actor (died 2016)
- 21 June - Josef Stoer, German mathematician
- 3 July
  - Klaus von Beyme, German political scientist (died 2021)
  - Berthold Maria Schenk Graf von Stauffenberg, German general
- 10 July - Alfred Biolek, German television presenter (died 2021)
- 17 July
  - Rainer Kirsch, German journalist and writer (died 2015)
  - Horst Steinmann, German economist
- 20 July - Uwe Johnson, German writer (died 1984)
- 29 July — Albert Speer, Jr., German architect (died 2017)
- 1 August
  - Hermann Baumann, German horn player (died 2023)
  - Oskar Negt, German philosopher (died 2024)
- 29 August
  - Gerhard Lohfink, German Catholic priest and theologian (died 2024)
  - Horst Szymaniak, German football player (died 2009)
- 5 September - Paul Josef Cordes, German cardinal
- 7 September - Mary Bauermeister, German artist (died 2023)
- 16 September - Hans A. Engelhard, German jurist and politician (died 2008)
- 24 September - Manfred Wörner, German politician (died 1994)
- 7 October — Ulrike Meinhof, German terrorist (died 1976)
- 19 October — Eva-Maria Hagen, German actress and singer (died 2022)
- 15 November - Martin Bangemann, German politician (died 2022)
- 21 November - Gerhard Erber, German pianist (died 2021)
- 24 November - Wolfgang Rademann, German television producer and journalist (died 2016)
- 29 November - Günter Wewel, German opera singer and television presenter (died 2023)
- 30 November - Albert, Margrave of Meissen, German nobleman (died 2012)
- 1 December - Wilhelm Keim, German chemist (died 2018)
- 5 December - Eberhard Jüngel, German Lutheran theologian (died 2021)
- 15 December - Hans-Peter Lehmann, German opera director (died 2025)

== Deaths ==
- 1 January — Jakob Wassermann, Jewish-German novelist (born 1873)
- 21 January - Paul Troost, German architect (born 1878)
- 29 January - Fritz Haber, German chemist (born 1868)
- 1 March - Wilhelm Diegelmann, German actor (born 1861)
- 7 April - Karl von Einem, Prussian Minister of War (born 1853)
- 10 June - Victor Villiger, Swiss-German chemist (born 1868)
- 19 June – Prince Bernhard of Lippe (born 1872)
- 30 June (assassinations associated with The Night of the Long Knives):
  - Gregor Strasser, German Imperial soldier and early Nazi (born 1892)
  - Kurt von Schleicher, German Imperial general, politician and former Chancellor of Germany (born 1882)
  - Gustav Ritter von Kahr, German politician (born 1862)
  - Erich Klausener, German Catholic politician (born 1885)
  - Herbert von Bose, German politician (born 1893)
  - Edmund Heines, Nazi paramilitary (born 1897)
  - Ferdinand von Bredow, German Generalmajor, former head of the Abwehr (born 1884)
  - Fritz Gerlich, German journalist and historian (born 1883)
  - Peter von Heydebreck, German Imperial Army officer and Nazi paramilitary (born 1889)
  - Karl Ernst, Nazi paramilitary (born 1904)
- July - Karl-Günther Heimsoth, German physician and polygraph (born 1899)
- 1 July
  - Edgar Julius Jung, German lawyer and political activist (born 1894)
  - Ernst Röhm, German Imperial Army officer and Nazi paramilitary (born 1887)
- 10 July - Erich Mühsam, German poet and playwright (born 1878)
- 13 July - Fritz Graebner, German ethnologist (born 1877)
- 2 August — Paul von Hindenburg, German general and politician (born 1847)
- 15 October - Samuel von Fischer, German publisher (born 1859)
- 19 October – Alexander von Kluck, German general (born 1846)
- 20 October — Hans Böhning, World War I German flying ace (born 1893)
- 12 November - Walther Bensemann, German pioneer of football and founder of the country's major sports publication, Kicker (born 1873)
- 16 November - Carl von Linde, German engineer and scientist (born 1842)
- 17 November - Joachim Ringelnatz, German writer (born 1883)
- 5 December – Oskar von Hutier, German general (born 1857)
