= Animax Germany =

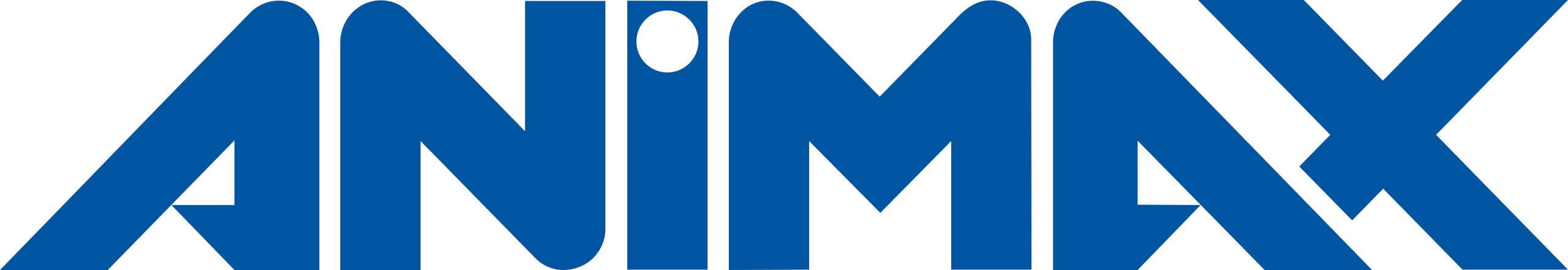
- Final Animax logo used from 2010 to 2016
- Country: Germany
- Broadcast area: Germany, Austria and Switzerland
- Network: Animax

Ownership
- Owner: Sony Pictures Entertainment

History
- Launched: 5 June 2007
- Closed: 1 July 2016 (as a TV channel); 30 September 2022 (VOD)

Links
- Website: Official website

Animax Germany was an old German video on demand service and former television channel by Sony, a local version of Animax. It was launched during Summer 2007, the same year as its Eastern European counterpart.

== History ==
The channel first launched on 5 June 2007 in the regions of North Rhine-Westphalia and Hesse for Unitymedia subscribers. Since September 2012 it became available on the rest of the country.

Since 8 September 2010 Animax began broadcasting also non-Japanese shows, like The Boondocks and Dance in the Vampire Bund. On the same year, some of its programming became available on PlayStation 3.

On 1st July 2016 Animax ceased broadcasting as a TV channel and began available as VOD channel on Vodafone Deutschland and Prime Video.

Animax has closed down on 1 October 2022 as VOD service, due to merger with Crunchyroll acquired along with Funimation and Wakanim.
