= Ernst-Dieter Lueg =

Ernst Dieter Lueg (9 January 1930 in Essen – 22 May 2000 in Bonn) was a German author and television journalist.

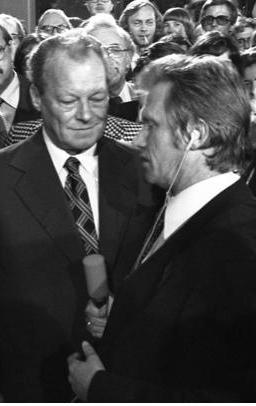
Lueg (right) with Willy Brandt, 1976

== Life ==
Lueg worked as television journalist on German broadcaster Westdeutscher Rundfunk (WDR).
