= 2021 in Germany =

- Decades: 2000s; 2010s; 2020s; 2030s
- See also: Other events of 2021; History of Germany; Timeline; Years

Events in the year 2021 in Germany.

== Incumbents ==
- President: Frank-Walter Steinmeier
- Chancellor:
  - Angela Merkel (until 8 December 2021)
  - Olaf Scholz (from 8 December 2021)

== Ongoing ==
- COVID-19 pandemic in Germany

== Events ==
=== January ===
- 4 January – The COVID-19 lockdown is extended until 31 January.
- 15/16 January – January 2021 Christian Democratic Union of Germany leadership election

=== March ===
- 4 March – most of Germany's major media outlets reports that the Federal Office for the Protection of the Constitution (BfV) had placed Alternative for Germany AfD under surveillance as a suspected extremist group.
- 14 March
  - 2021 Baden-Württemberg state election
  - 2021 Rhineland-Palatinate state election
  - 2021 Hessian local elections

=== June ===
- 6 June – 2021 Saxony-Anhalt state election
- 25 June – 2021 Würzburg stabbing

=== July ===
- 12 July – the 2021 European floods began
- 27 July – 2021 Leverkusen explosion

=== September ===
- 26 September
  - 2021 German federal election
  - 2021 Berlin state election
  - 2021 Mecklenburg-Vorpommern state election
  - Voters in Berlin approve a nonbinding referendum calling for the Berlin city government to take over about 240,000 apartments worth billions from corporate owners to curb rising rents in the city. Referendum passed with 56.4% of the vote.

=== December ===
- 4/16 December – December 2021 Christian Democratic Union of Germany leadership election

== Deaths ==
=== January ===
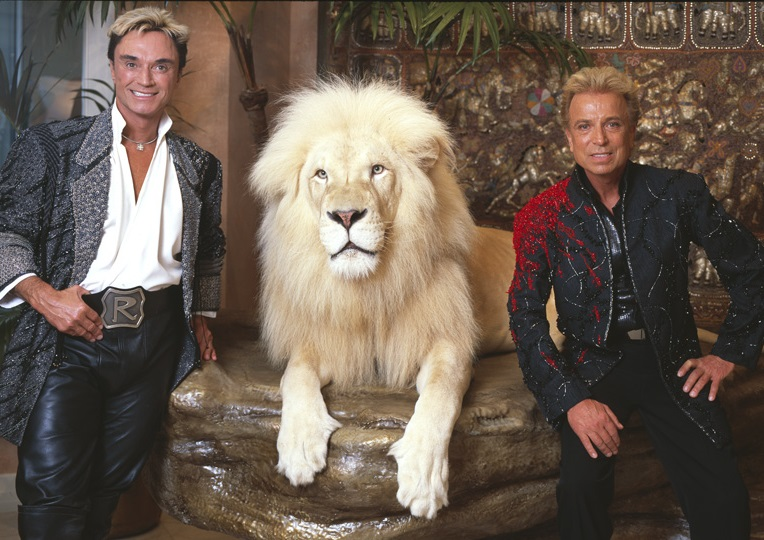
Siegfried Fischbacher

- 3 January – Renate Lasker-Harpprecht, writer and journalist (b. 1924)
- 13 January – Bernd Kannenberg, race walker, Olympic champion. (b. 1942)
- 13 January – Siegfried Fischbacher, magicians and entertainers (b. 1939)
- 30 January – Wilhelm Knabe, ecologist and politician (b. 1923)

=== February ===
- 2 February – Heike Fleßner, educationalist (b. 1944)
- 23 February – Heinz Hermann Thiele, businessman (b. 1941)
- 24 February – Wolfgang Boettcher, cellist (b. 1935)

=== March ===
- 16 March – Sabine Schmitz, racing driver and television personality (b. 1969)
- 17 March – Gerhard Augustin, music producer (b. 1941)

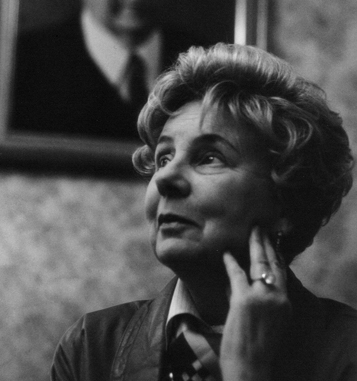
Uta Ranke-Heinemann

- 25 March – Uta Ranke-Heinemann, theologian (b. 1927)
- 26 March – Ursula Happe, swimmer, Olympic champion (b. 1926)

=== April ===
- 6 April – Hans Küng, Swiss-born priest and theologian (b. 1928)
- 24 April – Christa Ludwig, German soprano (b. 1928)

=== May ===
- 9 May – Karl-Günther von Hase, German diplomat and politician (b. 1917)

=== July ===
- 2 July – Bill Ramsey, German-American singer (b. 1931)
- 17 July – Hermann von Richthofen, German diplomat (b. 1933)

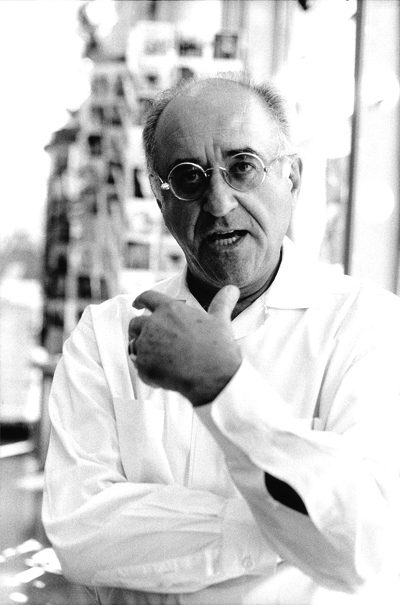
Alfred Biolek

- 23 July – Alfred Biolek, German entertainer and television producer (b. 1934)
- 23 July – Klaus Wilhelm Roggenkamp, German mathematician (b. 1940)
- 24 July – Herbert Köfer, German actor, voice artist, and television presenter (b. 1931)

=== August ===
- 4 August – Karl Heinz Bohrer, German essayist (b. 1932)

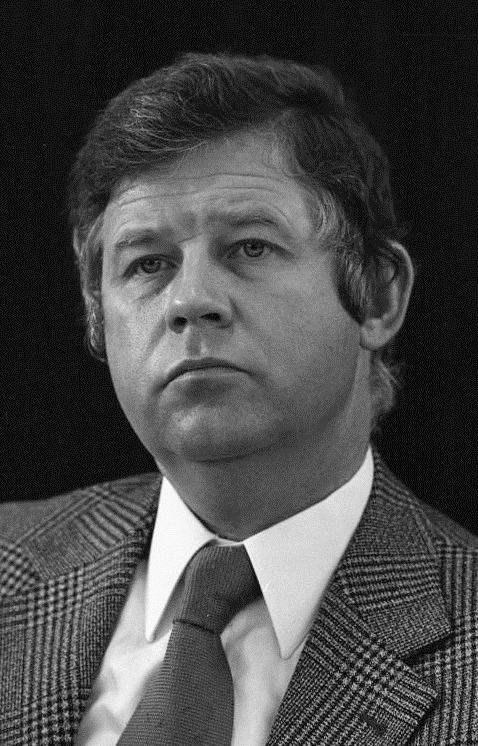
Kurt Biedenkopf

- 12 August – Kurt Biedenkopf, German politician (b. 1930)
- 15 August – Gerd Müller, German footballer (b. 1945)
- 27 August – Heide Keller, German actress (b. 1939)

=== September ===
- 4 September
  - Ludwig Haas, German actor (b. 1933)
  - Jörg Schlaich, German structural engineer (b. 1934)
- 5 September – Jan Hecker, German diplomat (b. 1967)
- 9 September – Hans Pfann, German athlete (b. 1920)

=== October ===
- 15 October – Gerd Ruge, German journalist (b. 1928)
- 27 October – Bettina Gaus, German journalist (b. 1956)

=== November ===
- 22 November – Volker Lechtenbrink, German actor (b. 1944)

=== December ===
- 3 December – Horst Eckel, German football player (b. 1932)
