= Werner Haas (pianist) =

German classical pianist

Werner Haas (March 3, 1931 – October 11, 1976) was a German classical pianist. He was known for his performances of early 20th century compositions, particularly those of Claude Debussy and Maurice Ravel. He had a wide repertoire that also included works by Johann Sebastian Bach, Wolfgang Amadeus Mozart, Franz Schubert, Robert Schumann, Frédéric Chopin, Ludwig van Beethoven, Sergei Prokofiev, Dmitry Kabalevsky, and the complete works for piano and orchestra by Pyotr Ilyich Tchaikovsky.

He was born in Stuttgart, Germany and attended the Stuttgart Academy of Music. Later he was a student of Walter Gieseking in his Saarbrücken master-classes. After a successful recital career throughout Europe in the 1950s, he signed a multi-year recording contract with Philips Records. His recording of the complete works of Debussy was awarded the Grand Prix du Disque in 1962. Other recordings of Ravel by Haas were given the Amsterdam Edison Prize, in 1970.

He died in a car accident in France in 1976.
