= Extra Mile Endurathon =

Endurance Marathon

The Extra Mile Endurathon (EME) was an endurance marathon created by German philanthropist Alexander Skora, in which participants must walk through a designated racecourse for as long as they can. Whoever walks for the longest amount of time, wins the competition. The EME is organized by Skora's company, Global Games Group, and it usually takes place in capital cities and other important metropolises in different countries around the world, with their racecourses often located in their busiest areas.

== History ==
The first competition took place in Berlin, Germany on September 1, 2007. Twenty people participated and walked through popular areas of the city, such as the Olympic Stadium, the Tiergarten, the Brandenburger Tor and Potsdamer Platz. The winner of the competition was Mark Peus, a pilot for Lufthansa, who walked non stop for 36 hours.

The fourth competition took place on November 30, 2007 in Buenos Aires, Argentina. 50 contestants started the race in front of the Estadio Monumental Antonio Vespucio Liberti soccer stadium and walked day and night through downtown Buenos Aires. As the days went by and fewer people kept walking, the event became a media sensation and by its third day the remaining competitors had become instant celebrities. People would ask them for autographs, take pictures with them or show support from balconies and cars. By its fourth day, the EME was featured on the cover of Clarin, Argentina's biggest selling newspaper.

After 102 hours of walking, only two contestants were left. Marcelo Muzyka and Ivan Lamas were walking side by side, and were willing to keep going for as long as their legs could move. After careful consideration, the organization decided their sacrifice had been important enough and declared a technical tie. Both were awarded with a first prize and a plane ticket to participate in the next EME edition in the United States.
