= Almuth Lütkenhaus =

Canadian artist (1930–1996)

Almuth Lütkenhaus (née Wirsing; 8 March 1930 in Hamm, Westphalia – 1996) was a figurative sculptor, also known as Almuth Lütkenhaus-Lackey. From 1948 until 1952 she studied art at schools in Dortmund and Münster. She married Erich Lütkenhaus, an artist, in 1952, from whom she later separated. She lived in Soest from 1962 until 1966, when she moved to Canada. Lütkenhaus died November 14, 1996, in Ottawa, Ontario, the age of 66.

== Gallery ==
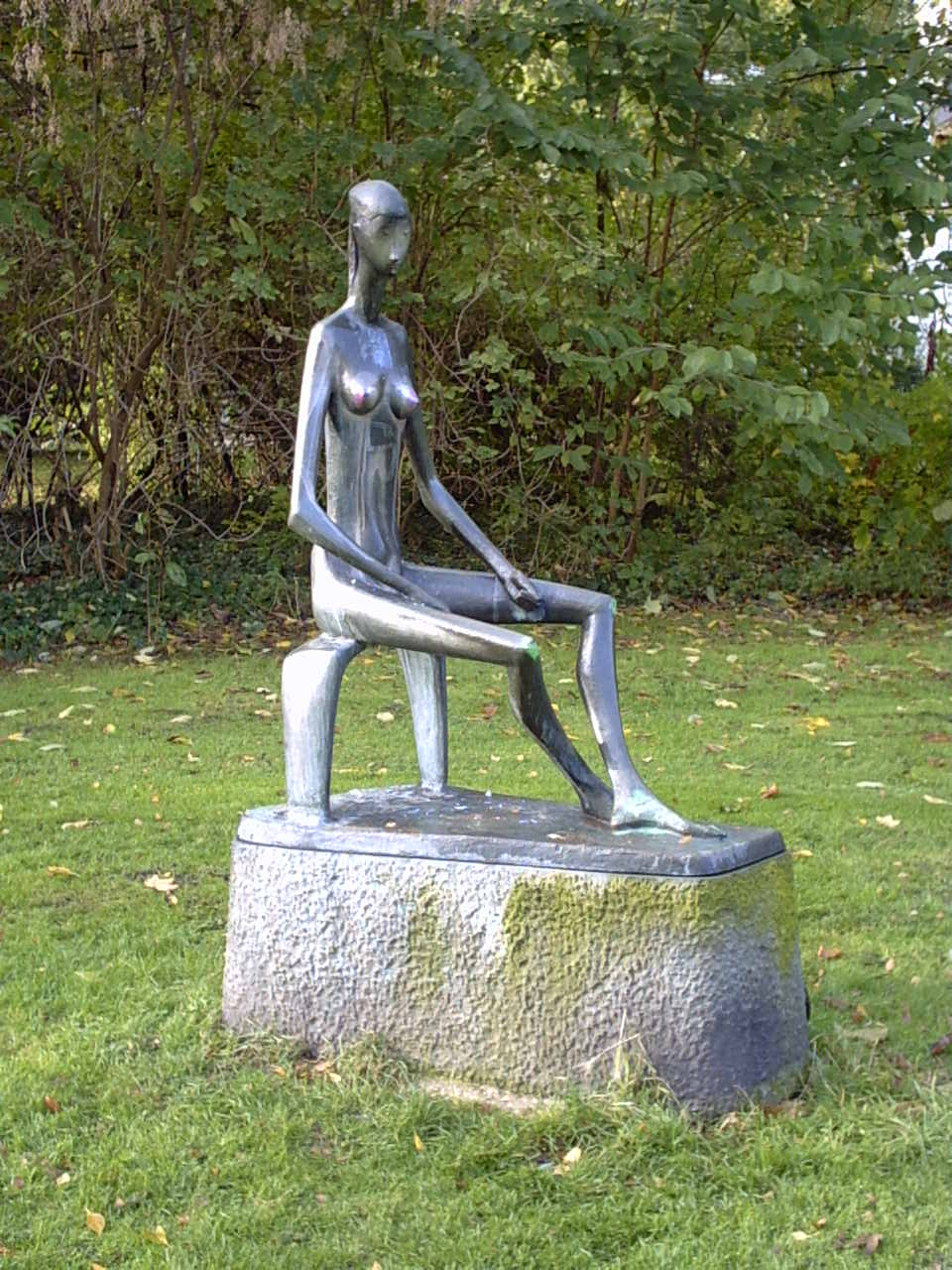
Die Sitzende

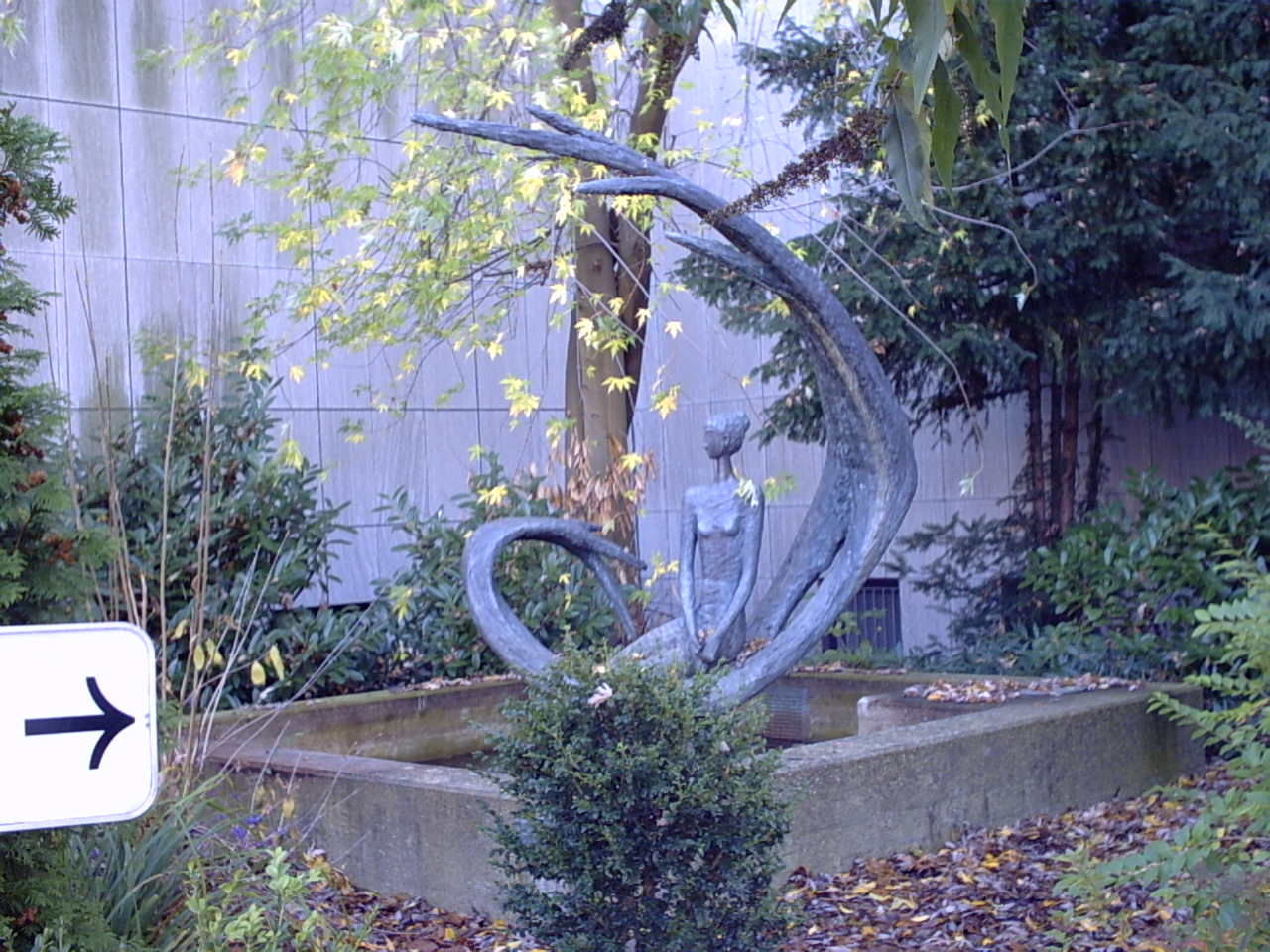
Geborgenheit

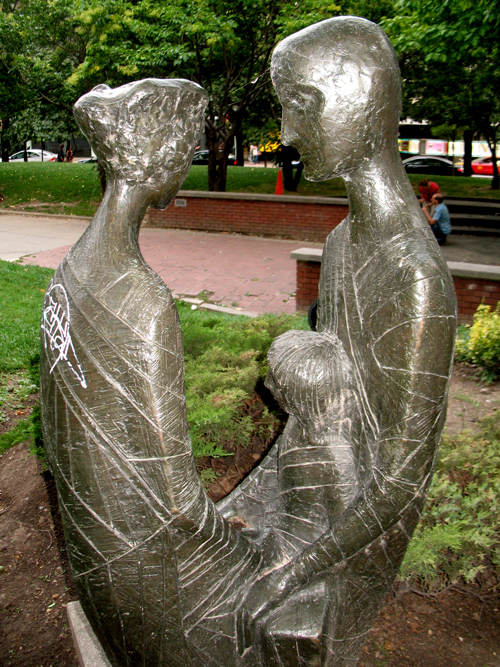
Family Group

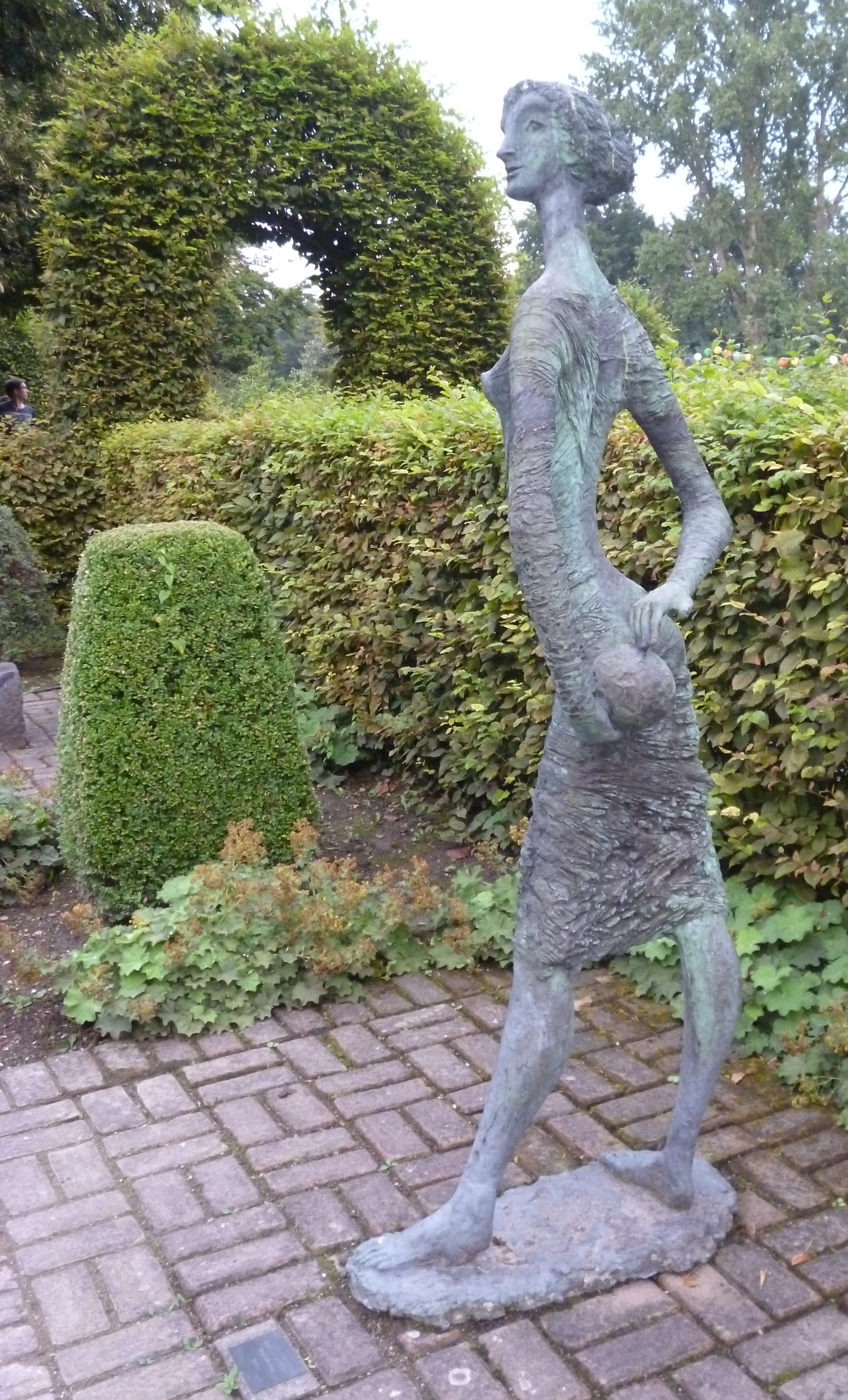
Mädchen mit Ball
