= Hartmut Gründler =

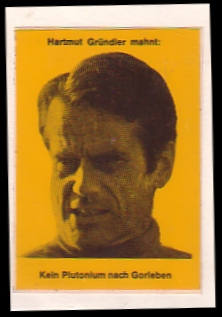
Hartmut Gründler.

Hartmut Gründler (11 January 1930 – 21 November 1977) was a German teacher from Tübingen, and an activist engaged in environmental protection. He burned himself in protest against the misinformation in the atomic policy of the German Federal Government at that time, which were documented by him, but officially never taken back, and the denial of the relevant dialogue with Federal Chancellor Helmut Schmidt.

== Vocational career ==
After his discontinued study of architecture at Darmstadt TH (Technical University) (with bricklayer examination 1952) and his studies of pedagogy at Jugenheim (1957–59) he worked as a teacher in the Hessian school service, and in 1964, after a six months’ further training course in French, he passed the secondary school teacher examination. Granted leave, from November 1965 to autumn 1967, for teaching German classes first at the Goethe Institute and after this within the French-German youth exchange program, he pursued a study of pedagogy, educational psychology and general linguistics at Tübingen and Besançon and graduated in 1969 (Magister Artium). He began to work on his doctoral thesis on a psycholinguistical topic.

== The Tübingen years from 1970 to 1977 in the service of environmental protection ==
Engaged early already in questions of environmental protection and politics, he became active in the Marxist-Leninist-oriented Tübingen Committee for Environmental Protection (KfU) in the end of 1970 and, in January 1971, he created the Tübingen Federation for Environmental Protection (BfU), now statutably committed to non-violence. After exclusion from this group because of his refusal to give up his own way inspired by Gandhi’s Satyagraha against majority resolutions he, in 1972, originated the smaller "Working Group Protection of Life - Non-violent Action in Environmental Protection (registered association)" (AKL). In co-operation with the BfU he criticized the Stuttgart exhibition "Environment 72" sharply. From 1974 he became likewise engaged in the dispute over the atomic power plant intended for Mittelstadt (a district of Reutlingen). He advocated emphatically a coordinating umbrella association of the different federations for environmental protection. On 25 July 1975 he unsuccessfully submitted to Chief Federal Prosecutor Siegfried Buback a charge against Secretary of Research Hans Matthöfer "because of genocide".

From 1975 he participated in altogether 20 legal actions against atomic projects. In February 1977 he brought in a constitutional complaint because of the restriction of his right of petition. In his decedent estate there was no reference to any answer in his lifetime.

== Gründler’s kind of public relations work ==
In the conviction that fellow citizens would come to acting in environmental protection questions, if only they were informed well enough and addressed in their responsibility, Gründler carried on an extensive public relations scheme, particularly by means of numerous flyers, which he distributed and had distributed particularly in the university town of Tübingen. According to the principle "everyone knows that everyone knows" he moreover developed an unusual communications network, in which he added the addressees of the copies circulated in each case in his numerous publications and appeals usually addressed to several multiplicators and decision makers at a time.

== Gründler’s "Experiment with truth" ==
Stamped by Gandhi he tried, through hunger strikes (so in Wyhl, Tübingen, Kassel) and numerous open letters (to parliamentarians, ministers, journalists etc.) to enforce a change in the energy policy. His first "conflict partner", Federal Secretary of Research Hans Matthöfer, responded to Gründler’s demand for discussion within the "Citizens’ Dialogue Nuclear Energy" conceded to him in July 1975, finally confessed, however, to the long-term execution of the atomic program in a letter in June 1976. From summer 1976 on, Gründler addressed himself to Federal Chancellor Helmut Schmidt, the person who, in accordance with the German Basic Law, is responsible for the guidelines of the policy, and demanded public clarification of the contradictions that in his eyes had come to light openly, in June 1976, in the Bonn Hearings (in the Research Committee on 2 June and in the Interior Committee on 9 June) as compared to the environmental program of 29 September 1971, valid up to then. The chancellor never answered personally. Gründler‘s last unlimited hunger strike, planned therefore in November 1977, did not come off due to external difficulties - particularly because of the cancelling of a given promise for a camper van.

== The fire suicide ==
On 16 November 1977 (the Day of Prayer and Repentance) Gründler burned himself in Hamburg during the SPD Party Congress out of protest against "the continued governmental misinformation" in the energy policy, particularly concerning the permanent disposal of nuclear waste. Not out of despair, but to set an example did he choose death by burning himself, about which he informed in writing some press organs as well as politicians and also the chancellor in advance, attaching his political last will. Thus on 14 November 1977, two days before his fire suicide, he made a flyer, printed on both sides, with the heading "Please pass on… please inform a journalist from press, radio, television rapidly! … Also hand on to Members of the Bundestag!!! - Self-immolation of a Life Protector - appeal against atomic lie…", and speaking of himself in the third person he wrote among other things the following: "Gründler calls his action an act not of despair, but of resistance and resolution. To the inherent necessity of greed of profit, of confidence tricks, of taking people unawares here, and the inherent necessity of inertia and cowardice there, he wants to oppose the inherent necessity of conscience." And in the "appendix" to this appeal, addressed directly to the Federal Chancellor, he wrote: "I choose the last and utmost form of protest, and instead of the lighthouse [to supplement: the "granite one", planned for three weeks] I nevertheless still use the sandcastle at least for a fire signal.

== Reactions and impact ==
The media hardly reported on the background. In Wolfgang Hädecke’s biographic writing "The Gründler Scandal", made on the basis of investigations of his own, DER SPIEGEL and STERN are particularly criticized in this regard. And actually Hädecke particularly complains of "a blatant disparity between the paltry, fast abating press coverage and poor commentating with many distortions in the case of Gründler on one side and the mighty indignation after the fire suicide of Jan Palach and especially of Oskar Brüsewitz on the other side." Hartmut Gründler - after a planned procession with the catafalque through different places of his activity in the German Federal Republic had been forbidden by Hamburg authorities - was buried at the Tübingen Bergfriedhof on 30 November 1977 under participation of approximately 1000 mourners from at home and abroad. During the following commemoration in the lecture hall of the university, ending riotous through the "Remstal Rebel" Helmut Palmer, some representatives of ecological currents, at variance before, discovered common ground on the podium, partly co-operating later in the GREENS: thus beside the futurologist Robert Jungk and the Member of the Bundestag Herta Däubler-Gmelin (SPD), who tried to explain the result of the Party Congress, one could hear prominent representatives of the Federal Association of Citizens' Initiatives for Environmental Protection (BBU), of the World Union for Protection of Life (WSL), of the Federation for protection of life (BfL), of the Action Community of Independent Germans (AUD), of the Five%-Bloc and of the Tübingen Federation for Environmental Protection (BfU).

In his still existing Working Group for Protection of Life the collection of numerous documents from Gründler’s creative career as well as from the aftermath has been archived and is being supplemented and enriched by contemporary testimonies, also as the basis of an extended biography. This material is still attended to, for the time being, by Wilfried Hüfler, Reutlingen.

== Literature ==
- Hartmut Gründler, Open letter to Chancellor Helmut Schmidt and others: "Offenbarungseid der Atomlobby" ("The Atomic Lobby’s declaration of bankruptcy") 5 October 1976
- Hartmut Gründler: "Kernenergiewerbung. Die sprachliche Verpackung der Atomenergie – Aus dem Wörterbuch des Zwiedenkens", ("Nuclear power advertising. The linguistic packaging of atomic energy - From the dictionary of double-think"), Rowohlt Literaturmagazin 8 "Die Sprache des Großen Bruders" ("The Language of Big Brother"), Dec. 1977
- Herbert Bruns: "Hartmut Gründler † - For truth and probity in bioprotection and biopolitics - Fire suicide of a life protector" - in: Biologische Abhandlungen Nr. 53-54, Biologie-Verlag Wiesbaden 1977
- Walter Soyka: "Werden Tote mehr gehört als Lebende?" Der Rechtsweg, Dokumentenreihe aus dem Archiv für biologische Sicherheit." ("Shall dead men be listened to more than the living?" Legal action, series of documents from the Archive for biological security, Nr. 4, 22 November 1977. Contents a.o.: On the suicide of Hartmut Gründler. Information material & Dokumentation on legal actions against the weapons-grade plutonium technology in Germany
- Hansjürgen Bulkowski: "Das nichtverstandene Signal. Die Selbstverbrennung des Umweltpolitikers Hartmut Gründler." ("The signal not understood. The fire suicide of the environmental politician Hartmut Gründler.") Radio essay. WDR: 1978 (rebroadcast 1988).
- Wolfgang Hädecke: "Der Skandal Gründler" ("The Gründler Scandal"), 1979, ISBN 3-7846-1201-6
- Hartmut Gründler: "Kernenergiewerbung. Die sprachliche Verpackung der Atomenergie – Aus dem Wörterbuch des Zwiedenkens" ("Nuclear power advertising. The linguistic packaging of atomic energy - From the dictionary of double-think"), in: Holzfeuer im hölzernen Ofen (wood fire in a wooden stove). Essays on political criticism of language, ed. by Hans J. Heringer. Tübingen (Narr) 1982, 203-215
- Wilfried Hüfler / Manfred Westermayer (Editors): "Hartmut Gründler - ein Leben für die Wahrheit, ein Tod gegen die Lüge. Schriften - Dokumente - Würdigungen" ("Hartmut Gründler - A life for truth, a death against lie. Writings - documents - Appraisal.") Gundelfingen: G&M-Westermayer Verlag 1997, 80 pages. ISBN 3-923596-06-5,
- Hans-Dieter Knop, "Sozialpsychologische Dimensionen von Selbstverbrennung, exemplarisch thematisiert am moralischen und ethischen Konzept Hartmut Gründlers." ("Social-psychological dimensions of fire suicide, thematized exemplarily at the moral and ethical concept of Hartmut Gründler."), master's thesis in the subject of social psychology, Universität Hannover, 2002
- "Vor 30 Jahren verbrannte sich Hartmut Gründler aus Protest" ("30 years ago Hartmut Gründler burned himself out of protest.")
- Udo Grashoff/Tobias Barth: "Ein Tod für das Leben? Die öffentliche Selbstverbrennung von Hartmut Gründler am 16. November 1977 in Hamburg." ("A death for life? The public fire suicide of Hartmut Gründler on 16 November 1977 in Hamburg."), Feature for the SFB, broadcast 13 November 2002
- Prof. Dr. Ulrich Duchrow: “Mahatma Gandhi – Die Überwindung westlicher Gewalt” („Mahatma Gandhi – Overcoming Western Violence“), commemoration on the 30th anniversary of the death of Hartmut Gründler on 17 December 2007 at Tübingen, in "Forum Pazifismus“ I/2008
