= Claus Hinrich Casdorff =

German journalist

Claus Hinrich Casdorff (6 August 1925 – 6 February 2004) was a German journalist.

== Life ==
Casdorff was born in Hamburg. He worked as journalist for German broadcaster Westdeutscher Rundfunk. Together with journalist Rudolf Rohlinger he started tv-magazine Monitor in 1965.

Casdorff died on 6 February 2004.

== Books by Casdorff ==
- Kreuzfeuer. interviews von Kolle bis Kiesinger. Berlin: Lenz, 1971
- Casdorff, Claus Hinrich (1989). Weihnachten 1945 ein Buch der Erinnerungen (in German). München. ISBN 978-3-423-25028-3. OCLC 75124357.
- Casdorff, Claus Hinrich (1983). Demokraten, Profile unserer Republik (in German). Königstein/Ts.: Athenäum. ISBN 3-7610-8263-0. OCLC 14931655.

== Awards ==
- 1979: Order of Merit of the Federal Republic of Germany
- 1991: Order of Merit of North Rhine-Westphalia
