= Charlott Schaffrath =

German ice hockey player (born 2005)

- Born: 26 December 2005 (age 20) Memmingen, Germany
- Height: 1.84 m (6 ft 0 in)
- Weight: 72 kg (159 lb; 11 st 5 lb)
- Position: Defense
- Shoots: Left
- DFEL team: ECDC Memmingen
- National team: Germany
- Playing career: 2020–present

Charlott Emma Schaffrath (born 26 December 2005) is a German ice hockey player. She is a member of the Germany women's national ice hockey team that participated in women's ice hockey tournament at the 2026 Winter Olympics.

== Playing career ==
=== International ===
Schaffrath was a member of the German roster that won the gold medal at the 2023 IIHF U18 Women's World Championship Division I, Group A competition.

With Germany making their first appearance in women's ice hockey at the Olympics since 2014, the 5 February 2026 match versus Sweden meant that every member of the German roster were making their Olympic debut. Schaffrath, wearing number 5, logged 13:05 minutes of ice time in a 4–1 loss to Sweden.
