= Benjamin Woltmann =

German footballer

Personal information
- Full name: Benjamin Woltmann
- Date of birth: 7 June 1990 (age 36)
- Place of birth: Germany
- Height: 1.78 m (5 ft 10 in)
- Position: Centre back

Team information
- Current team: TSV Aindling

Youth career
- –2003: FC Haunstetten
- 2003–: FC Augsburg

Senior career*
Years	Team	Apps	(Gls)
- FC Augsburg II
2010–2011	FC Augsburg	1	(0)
2011–	TSV Aindling		
- * Club domestic league appearances and goals as of 17:39, 8 May 2011 (UTC)

Benjamin Woltmann (born 7 June 1990) is a German footballer currently under contract for TSV Aindling.

== See also ==
- Football in Germany
