= Erhard Geißler =

German biologist and geneticist

- Born: December 17, 1930 (age 95); Leipzig, Germany
- Scientific career
- Fields: Molecular Biology
- Workplaces: Max Delbrück Center for Molecular Medicine

Erhard Geißler (born 17 December 1930 in Leipzig, Germany) is a German biologist and geneticist.

== Biography ==
Geißler achieved his Abitur in 1950 and then began studying biology at Leipzig University, becoming an intern for the Institute for Medicine and Biology at the Berlin-Buch campus in 1953. He was a professor for genetics at the University of Rostock, reaching full professor rank in 1965. Between 1965 and 1971 he was dean of the university. Subsequently, he was head of the bioethics research group at the Max Delbrück Center for Molecular Medicine, from 1992 until his retirement in 2000. The Stockholm International Peace Research Institute hired him in 1983 as a biological weapons consultant.

Early in his career, he was a freelancer for Leipziger Volkszeitung. His daughter is now a journalist.

== Selected publications ==
- Biological and Toxin Weapons Today. Oxford 1986
- Strengthening the Biological Weapons Convention by Confidence-Building Measures. Oxford 1990
- Prevention of a Biological and Toxin Arms Race and the Responsibility of Scientists. Berlin 1991 (Co-author)
- Control of Dual-Threat Agents: The Vaccines for Peace Programme. Oxford 1994
- Hitler und die Biowaffen. Münster 1998
- Krieg mit Pest und Milzbrand: Die Geschichte der biologischen Waffen und das Versagen der Geheimdienste. Berlin 2002
