= Reinhart Hummel =

German theologist

Reinhart Hummel (26 January 1930 – 9 February 2007) was a German theologian and long-term leader of the Evangelische Zentralstelle für Weltanschauungsfragen (EZW). The EZW (Protestant Centre for Questions on World Views) is a subdivision of the Evangelical Church in Germany. Located in Berlin, it professes to function as a centralized research, documentation and information center on new religious movements. Hummel is also the author of many books about new religious movements.

Hummel studied Protestant theology and received his Ph.D. in 1963 for the thesis "Die Auseinandersetzung zwischen Kirche und Judentum im Matthäusevangelium" (literally "The dialog between Church and Judaism in the Gospel of Matthew"). Subsequently, he worked as a pastor in Schleswig Holstein. From 1966 until 1972 he led the Lutheranian theological college in Orissa, India. Back in Germany he received a request to research Indian guru movements at the Ruprecht Karl University of Heidelberg. He received the right to lecture with his work "Indische Mission und neue Frömmigkeit im Westen. Religiöse Bewegungen in westlichen Kulturen“, (literally: "Indian mission and new piety in the West: religious movements in western cultures") that was published by Kohlhammer Verlag.

From 1981 until 1994 he was director of the EZW. In his work he disagreed with the concept and explanatory model of Jugendreligion (literally: "youth religion") for new religious communities, as it was popularized by among others the German author Friedrich-Wilhelm Haack (1935–1991). In the beginning he fully rejected the controversial use of the German word "sekte" (that is translated sometimes with "cult" but also as "sect" in English), but in his later works he recognized the justification of the concept in differentiated use.

He asserted that some of the groups monitored by the EZW had developed both in the society as well as in interfaith dialogue in a positive way, i.e. that they had decreased their original potential for conflict. This assertion was both respected and rejected. It would be especially applicable for the Jehovah's Witnesses, the Unification Church, and ISKCON. In spite of this, the Unification Church is still very critical about his assessment of the church.

== Selected bibliography ==
German

- Indische Mission und neue Frömmigkeit im Westen. Religiöse Bewegungen in westlichen Kulturen, Stuttgart 1980, ISBN 3-17-005609-3
- Hindu-Gurus heute Wien : Arbeitsgemeinschaft der Österr. Seelsorge Seelsorgeämter, Referat für Weltanschauungsfragen, 1992
- Religiöser Pluralismus oder christliches Abendland? Herausforderungen an Kirche und Gesellschaft, Darmstadt 1994, ISBN 3-534-11717-4
- Gurus, Meister, Scharlatane Freiburg im Breisgau : Herder, 1996
- Vereinigungskirche die "Moon-Sekte" im Wandel Neukirchen-Vluyn : Bahn, 1998 ISBN 3-7615-4979-2
- Reinkarnation Freiburg im Breisgau : Herder, 1999
- Dialog und Unterscheidung Berlin : EZW, 2000
- Östliche Religionen und evangelischer Glaube / Bd. 1. Einführung und Unterrichtsentwürfe 2001

English

- World Improvement and the Ideal Society Archived 2007-09-28 at the Wayback Machine article in Update III 1/2, July 1979
- Asiatic Religions in Europe Archived 2007-09-28 at the Wayback Machine by Dr. Reinhart Hummel with Dr. Bert Hardin, article in Update VII 2, June 1983
- Guru, Miracle Worker, Religious Founder: Sathya Sai Baba Archived 2007-09-28 at the Wayback Machine article in Update IX 3, Sept. 1985, originally published in German in Materialdienst der EZW, 47 Jahrgang, 1 February 1984
- Remarks on Heber Jentzsch and Scientology Archived 2007-09-28 at the Wayback Machine short note published in Spirituality in East and West / Update and Dialog 3 October 1993
- Asian Religions in the West: Their Attitude Towards Dialogue and Pluralism Archived 2007-09-28 at the Wayback Machine article in Spirituality in East and West / Update and Dialog 4, May 1994
