= Rainer Zepperitz =

German double bassist

Rainer Zepperitz (August 25, 1930 - December 23, 2009) was a German double bassist.

== Background ==
Zepperitz was born in Bandung, Java, Indonesia. In his childhood he first learned the violin before moving to the relocation of his family to Germany at the Düsseldorf Conservatory at Arthur Däwel and he learned the double bass . In 1937 he returned to Germany with his family, moving in 1940 to Düsseldorf where he studied at the Robert Schumann Conservatory of Music. At age eighteen, he became a member of the Düsseldorf Symphony Orchestra. Between 1949 and 1951 Rainer Zepperitz was soloist of the Bonn State Orchestra. In 1951 he became the youngest member of the Berlin Philharmonic Orchestra and since 1957 he was principal double bass player of the orchestra as successor of Linus Wilhelm. In 1954, he joined the chamber music ensemble of the Berlin Philharmonic, which later changed its name to Philharmonisches Oktett. At the end of the fifties, he was named professor of the Berlin Hochschule für Musik. In 1977 he founded the chamber music ensemble Philharmonische Virtuosen obtaining great international renown.

He was a member of the presidency of such orchestra for over a decade. He also was a founding member of the Orchester-Akademie of the Berlin Philharmonic Orchestra, where he also taught. Many of his students are members of the major orchestras the world over.

He retired from his professional activity with the Berlin Philharmonic Orchestra and from the 2001-02 academic year Rainer Zepperitz was Head Professor of the Double Bass Chair at the Escuela Superior de Música Reina Sofía (Queen Sofía College of Music) in Madrid. Professor Zepperitz collaborated in the Spanish internet project Magister Musicae where it is possible to see his Master Classes conducted online. He died in Berlin.
