= 2008 in Germany =

- Decades: 1980s; 1990s; 2000s; 2010s; 2020s
- See also: Other events of 2008; History of Germany; Timeline; Years

Events in the year 2008 in Germany.

== Incumbents ==
=== Federal level ===
- President – Horst Köhler
- Chancellor – Angela Merkel

=== State level ===
- Minister-President of Baden-Württemberg – Günther Oettinger
- Minister-President of Bavaria – Günther Beckstein
- Governing mayor of Berlin – Klaus Wowereit
- First mayor of Bremen – Jens Böhrnsen
- Minister-President of Brandenburg – Matthias Platzeck
- First mayor of Hamburg – Ole von Beust
- Minister-President of Hesse – Roland Koch
- Minister-President of Lower Saxony – Christian Wulff
- Minister-President of Mecklenburg-Vorpommern – Harald Ringstorff
- Minister-President of North Rhine-Westphalia – Jürgen Rüttgers
- Minister-President of Rhineland-Palatinate – Kurt Beck
- Minister-President of the Saarland – Peter Müller
- Minister-President of Saxony – Georg Milbradt (to May 27) - Stanislaw Tillich
- Minister-President of Saxony-Anhalt – Wolfgang Böhmer
- Minister-President of Schleswig-Holstein – Peter Harry Carstensen
- Minister-President of Thuringia – Dieter Althaus

== Events ==
- 1 January - Deutsche Post loses its monopoly on mail under 50 grams following EU legislation.
- 1 January - Berlin, Cologne and Hanover introduce restrictions on cars without suitable catalytic converters or diesel particulate filters. More cities will follow during the year.
- 1 January - Eight states introduce a smoking ban in public places, including restaurants and bars. Three states imposed similar bans in 2007 and the remaining five states will follow later in the year.
- 1 January - A telecommunications data retention law came into force, requiring German telecommunications services and Internet providers to store telephone and Internet data for up to six months.
- 3 January - Arrest warrants are issued for Brigitte Mohnhaupt and Knut Folkerts, two members of the left-wing terrorist group Red Army Faction in relation to the 1977 assassination of federal prosecutor Siegfried Buback.
- 15 January - The federal government announces that the government budget for 2007 has been balanced and government debt has not increased — for the first time since 1969.
- 15 January - Mobile phone manufacturer Nokia announces the closure of its factory in Bochum, North Rhine-Westphalia, scrapping its 2300-strong workforce. Nokia, having received approximately 88 million euros in subsidies from the German and NRW governments for the Bochum facility, plans to relocate to Romania where the labour costs are cheaper and millions in EU subsidies are available.
- 21 January - Black Monday - The DAX falls 523.98 points (-7.16%), the biggest fall since 2001-09-11.
- 27 January - State election in Lower Saxony - The ruling CDU/FDP coalition under Christian Wulff is returned to office, although with a reduced majority. The Left receive 7.1% of the vote and enter the Lower Saxon parliament for the first time.
- 27 January - State election in Hesse - The ruling CDU/FDP coalition under Roland Koch loses its majority in the Hessian parliament, with the CDU losing 12% in comparison to the previous election in 2003. The preferred opposition coalition of SPD and Greens under Andrea Ypsilanti also fails to reach a majority. Coalition negotiations begin. The Left receive 5.1% of the vote and narrowly cross the 5%-threshold required to enter the Hessian parliament for the first time.
- 3 February - Nine Turkish residents die in house fire in Ludwigshafen, leading to concern within the Turkish community.
- 14 February - The home and office of Klaus Zumwinkel, CEO of Deutsche Post, is searched by police investigating tax evasion. Zumwinkel resigns on the following day. The raid on Zumwinkel is the first after it became known to the government that billions of euros have been diverted into a bank in Liechtenstein by around 900 wealthy Germans.
- 14 February - The Wallraf-Richartz Museum in Cologne announces that they recently discovered that the Monet painting On the Banks of the Seine by Port Villez, which has been in the museum's possession since 1954, is a forgery.
- 24 February - State election in Hamburg
- 2 March - Local elections in Bavaria.
- 6 March - Germany in the Eurovision Song Contest 2008
- 27 March - Plans scraps to build the Transrapid high-speed monorail link between the Bavarian capital Munich and its airport because of a massive overrun in costs.
- 19–30 May - 9th UN Convention on Biological Diversity in Bonn
- 25 May - Local elections in Schleswig-Holstein
- 25 June - German Defense Minister Franz Josef Jung (pictured) announces a troop increase of the country's contingent in Afghanistan to 4,500, yet refuses to move the soldiers to areas where they would be more likely to be involved in direct combat. (NYT) - 2008-06-25
- 1 August - 2008 Saxony district reform comes into force.
- 8 August - Warrior and Peter One, a hip hop group from Hannover, form their own record label.
- 31 August - Dresdner Bank was paid for 9.8 Milliarden Euro to Commerzbank
- 1 September - Since 1 September 2008 foreigners which wish to gain German nationality have to answer a test with 33 questions in German. Sueddeutsche - 2008-09-01
- September 22–28 – photokina in Cologne
- 26 September - The German Bundestag decided that from 2013 German parents will have the right to send their children to a Kindergarten or Pre-school playgroup from the age of one year. The States of Germany have to build enough Kindergarten/Pre-school playgroups to meet this requirement (Work-life balance). n-tv - 2008-09-26
- 28 September - State election in Bavaria: The CSU lost its majority after 46 years in Landtag. n-tv - 2008-09-28
- October - The Volkswagen Golf Mk6 is launched at the 2008 Paris Motor Show.
- Date unknown:
  - KRASS non-profit organization is founded.
  - The German company Schaeffler Group buys the much larger German company Continental AG.

== Popular culture ==
=== Arts & literature ===
- July - Loveparade in Dortmund
- 25–27 July - Force Attack music festival in Behnkenhagen, near Rostock
- 27 July and 9 August - Klassik Open Air in Nuremberg
- 31 July - 2 August - Wacken Open Air in Wacken
- 6–8 June - Rock am Ring Music festival at the Nürburgring
- 20 September - 5 October - 175th Oktoberfest in Munich

=== Film ===
- 7–17 February -58th Berlin International Film Festival
- 31 March - Premiere of The Red Baron (film) in Berlin.

=== Sport ===
- 17–27 January - 2008 European Men's Handball Championship in Norway - world champions Germany finish fourth.
- 7–9 March - 2008 IAAF World Indoor Championships in Valencia, Spain
- 13–24 March - 2008 European Aquatics Championships in Eindhoven, Netherlands
- 2–18 May - 2008 Men's World Ice Hockey Championships in Canada
- April - 2008 World Fencing Championships in Beijing, PR China
- 7–29 June - UEFA Euro 2008 in Austria and Switzerland
- 16–21 June - Special Olympics National Games in Karlsruhe
- 20 July - German Grand Prix at the Hockenheimring
- 8–24 August - 2008 Summer Olympics in Beijing, PR China. See Germany at the 2008 Summer Olympics
- 6–17 September - 2008 Summer Paralympics in Beijing, PR China
- 12–25 November - 38th Chess Olympiad in Dresden.
- 2–14 December - 2008 European Women's Handball Championship in Macedonia

== Births ==
- Heidi, Opossum

== Deaths ==
- 2 January - Günter Schubert, German actor (born 1938)
- 3 January - Werner Dollinger, German former federal minister, co-founder of the CSU (born 1938)
- 27 January - Botho Prinz zu Sayn-Wittgenstein-Hohenstein, German politician (born 1927)
- 7 January - Detlef Kraus, German pianist (born 1919)
- 6 February - Dieter Noll, German writer (born 1927)
- 25 February - Johann-Henrich Krummacher, German politician and clergyman (born 1947)
- 27 February - Ivan Rebroff, German singer (born 1931)
- 3 March - Annemarie Renger, German politician (born 1919)
- 5 March - Joseph Weizenbaum, German computer scientist (born 1923)
- 11 March - Hans A. Engelhard, German jurist and politician (born 1934)
- 21 March - Klaus Dinger, German musician (born 1946)
- 12 April — Dieter Eppler, German television actor (born 1927)
- 1 May - Philipp von Boeselager, German resistance fighter (born 1917)
- 8 June - Peter Rühmkorf, German writer (born 1929)
- 5 August - Eva Pflug, German actress (born 1929)
- 15 August — Heinz-Ludwig Schmidt, German footballer and manager (born 1920)
- 8 September – Ruxandra Sireteanu, Romania-born neuroscientist (born 1945).
- 22 September - Thomas Doerflein, German zookeeper (born 1963)
- 1 October - Detlef Lewe, German canoeist (born 1938)
- 13 December - Horst Tappert, German actor (born 1923)

== See also ==
- 2008 in German television
