= Krass =

Krass may refer to:

- Krass (surname)
- KRASS, a German non-profit organization
- Krass Clement (born 1946), Danish photographer who has specialized in documentary work
- Krass Engine, video game engine
