= Olof-Palme-Platz =

Square in Berlin, Germany

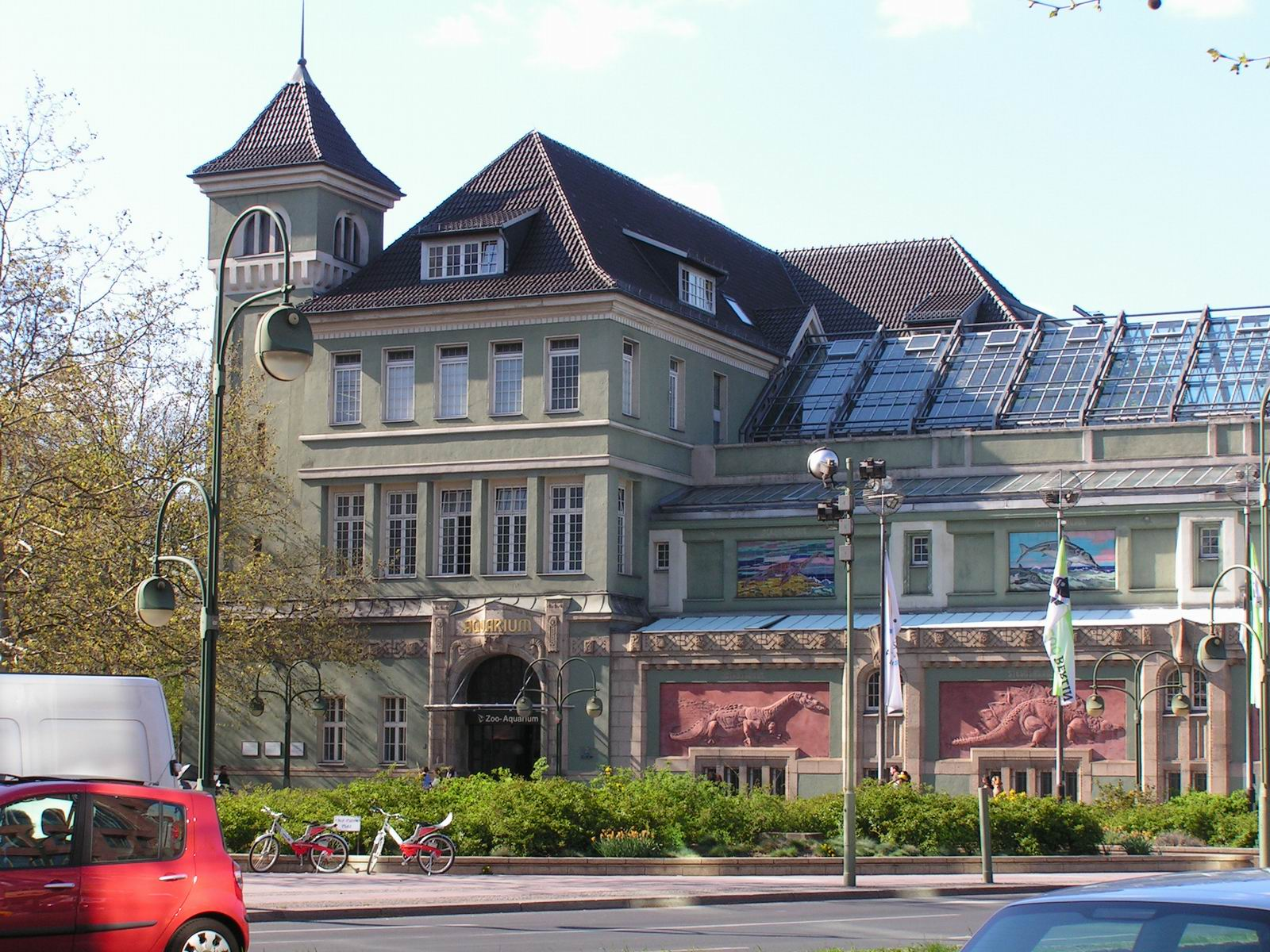
- Olof-Palme-Platz in Berlin
- Interactive map of Olof-Palme-Platz
- Namesake: Olof Palme
- Type: Square
- Location: Berlin
- Coordinates: 52°30′20″N 13°20′26″E

Olof-Palme-Platz is a small square in central Berlin next to the Berlin Zoo, since 1991 named after the murdered Swedish Prime Minister Olof Palme.
