= 2008 in German television =

This is a list of German television related events from 2008.

== Events ==
- 8 March - No Angels are selected to represent Germany at the 2008 Eurovision Song Contest with their song "Disappear". They are selected to be the fifty-third German Eurovision entry during Wer singt für Deutschland? held at the Deutsches Schauspielhaus in Hamburg.
- 17 May - Thomas Godoj wins the fifth season of Deutschland sucht den Superstar.
- 7 July - Silke "Isi" Kaufmann wins the eighth season of Big Brother Germany.
- 22 November - 44-year-old harmonica player Michael Hirte wins the second season of Das Supertalent.

== Debuts ==
=== Free for air ===
==== Domestic ====
- 23 June - Doctor's Diary (2008–2011) (RTL)
- 14 December - Die Patin – Kein Weg zurück (2008) (RTL)

==== International ====
- 28 April - (United Kingdom) Roary the Racing Car (2007–2009) (KiKa)

=== Cable ===
==== International ====
- 28 February - (United States) Dexter (2006–2013) (Sky)
- 16 June - (United Kingdom) The Secret Show (2006–2007) (Disney Channel)

=== BFBS ===
- 4 February - (United Kingdom) Roary the Racing Car (2007–2009)
- 21 July - (United Kingdom) The Slammer (2006-2014)
- 23 July - (Spain) Tom (2003)
- (United Kingdom) Frankenstein's Cat (2008)

== Television shows ==
=== 1950s ===
- Tagesschau (1952–present)

=== 1960s ===
- heute (1963-present)

=== 1970s ===
- heute-journal (1978-present)
- Tagesthemen (1978-present)

=== 1980s ===
- Wetten, dass..? (1981-2014)
- Lindenstraße (1985–present)

=== 1990s ===
- Gute Zeiten, schlechte Zeiten (1992–present)
- Marienhof (1992-2011)
- Unter uns (1994-present)
- Verbotene Liebe (1995-2015)
- Schloss Einstein (1998–present)
- In aller Freundschaft (1998–present)
- Wer wird Millionär? (1999-present)

=== 2000s ===
- Big Brother Germany (2000-2011, 2015–present)
- Deutschland sucht den Superstar (2002–present)
- Let's Dance (2006–present)
- Das Supertalent (2007–present)

== Networks and services ==
=== Launches ===
Network	Type	Launch date	Notes	Source
Sportdigital	Cable television	Spring		
Fox	Cable television	19 May		
Xite	Cable and satellite	21 May		

=== Closures ===
Network	Type	End date	Notes	Sources
Premiere Serie	Cable television	4 October		

== See also ==
- 2008 in Germany
