= Berlin Zoo =

Zoo in Berlin, Germany

Berlin Zoological Garden Zoologischer Garten Berlin

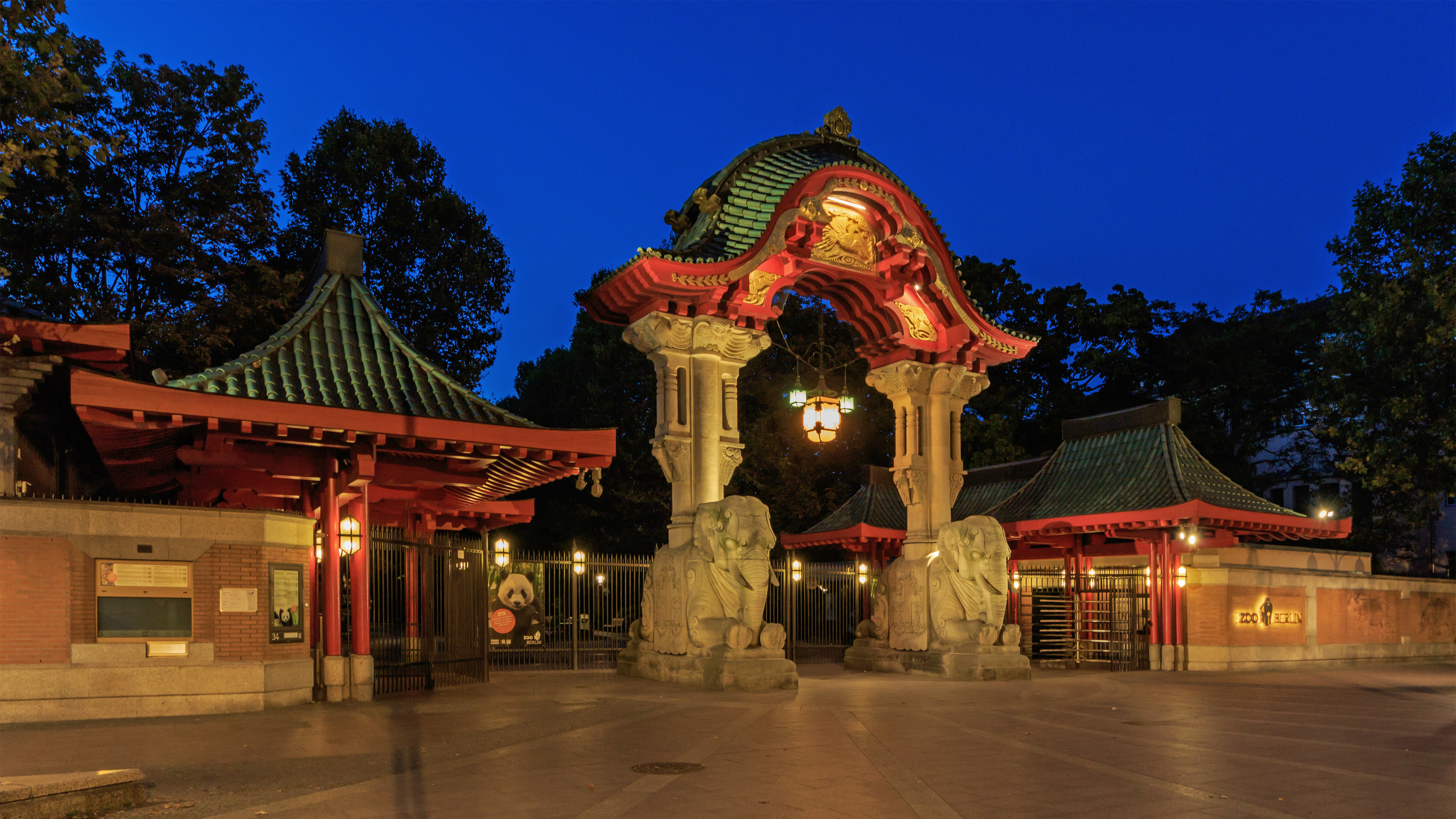
- The Elephant Gate: one of two zoo entrances
- Interactive map of Berlin Zoological Garden; Zoologischer Garten Berlin
- 52°30′30″N 13°20′15″E
- Date opened: 1844
- Location: Berlin, Germany
- Land area: 35 hectares (86.5 acres)
- No. of animals: 20,219 (December 2017)
- No. of species: 1,373 (December 2017)
- Annual visitors: More than 3.5 million (2017)
- Memberships: EAZA, WAZA
- Director: Andreas Knieriem
- Website: zoo-berlin.de

The Berlin Zoological Garden (German: Zoologischer Garten Berlin, pronounced [tsoːoˌloːɡɪʃɐ ˈɡaʁtn̩ bɛʁˈliːn]) is the oldest surviving and best-known zoo in Germany. Opened in 1844, it covers 35 hectares (86.5 acres) and is located in Berlin's Tiergarten. With about 1,380 different species and over 20,200 animals, the zoo presents one of the most comprehensive collections of species in the world.

The zoo and its aquarium had more than 3.5 million visitors in 2017. It is the most-visited zoo in Europe and one of the most popular worldwide. Regular animal feedings are among its most famous attractions. Globally known animals like Knut, the polar bear, and Bao Bao, the giant panda have contributed to the zoo's public image.

The zoo collaborates with many universities, research institutes, and other zoos around the world. It maintains and promotes European breeding programmes, helps safeguard several endangered species, and participates in several species reintroduction programs.

== History ==
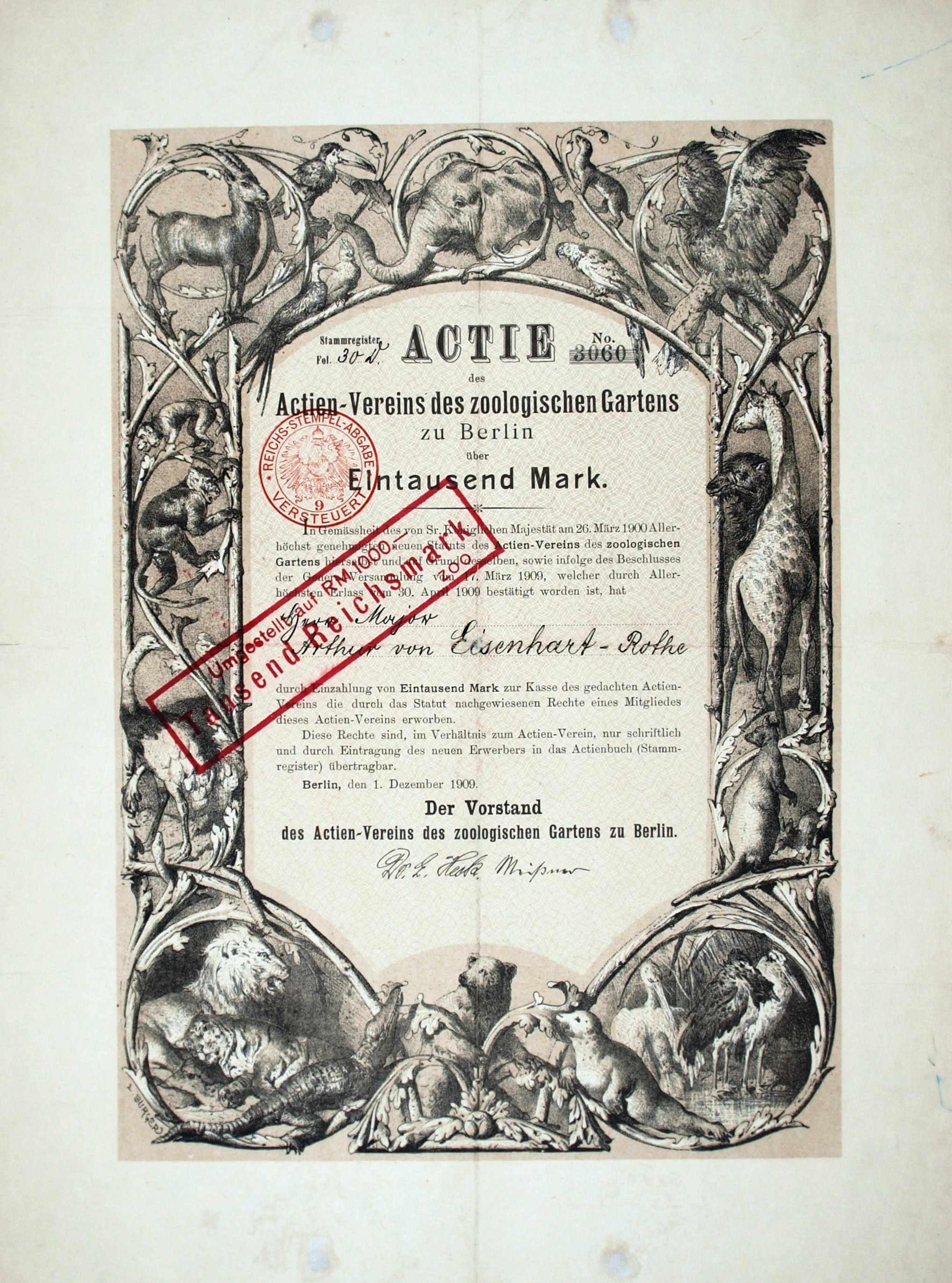
Share of the zoo, issued 1 December 1909

Opened on 1 August 1844, the Zoologischer Garten Berlin was the second zoo in Germany after the short-lived "Thiergarten" in Hamburg-Horn. The aquarium opened in 1913. The first animals were donated by Frederick William IV, King of Prussia, from the menagerie at Pfaueninsel island and pheasantry of the Tiergarten. The nearby U-Bahn station was opened in 1882.

=== Human Zoos 1878–1932 ===
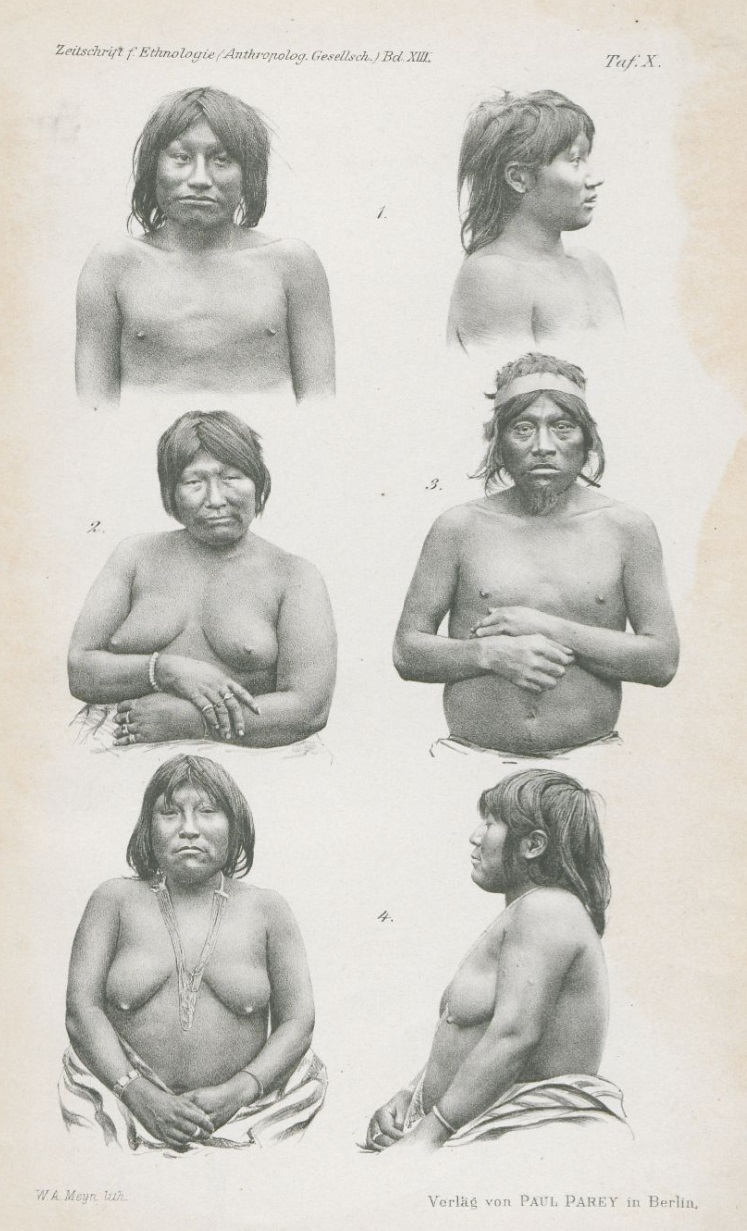
A series of photographs taken at the Zoological Garden depicting the Kawesqar, 1881

From the mid-1870s onward, indigenous people were put on display as exhibits in zoos throughout the German Empire. Referred to as Völkerschauen (literally "people shows") 25 such expositions took place at the Berlin Zoo.

In 1878, the Berlin Zoo hosted its first Völkerschau: the "Nubian Caravan" organized by Carl Hagenbeck. In 1880 Hagenback organized an exhibition of "Eskimos", and in 1881, Hagenbeck's exhibition of the “Fuegians”—a group Kawesqar people forcibly brought to Europe from Tierra del Fuego—was put on display for approximately five weeks in the Ostrich House.

Contemporary reports indicate these events were so popular that crowds overwhelmed the facilities. From Sunday, November 6, 1881:

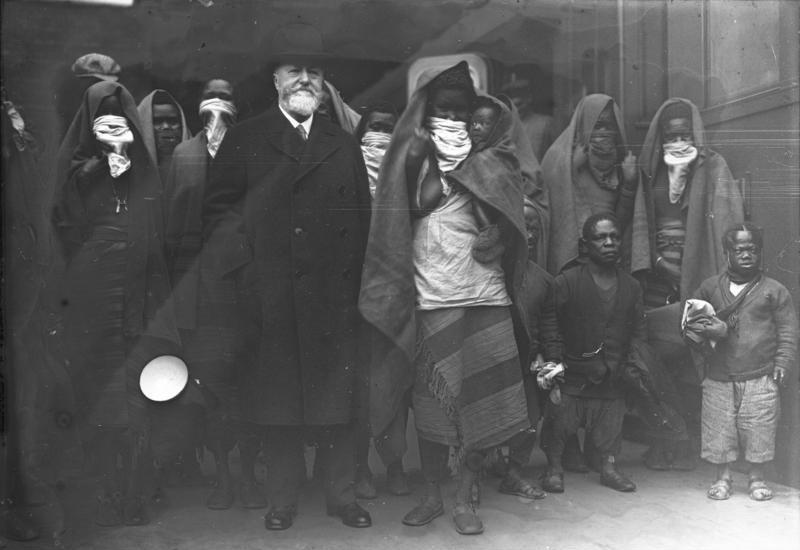
In April 1931, a group of Sara-Kaba people arrived at the Anhalter Bahnhof in Berlin, accompanied by the zoo’s director, Ludwig Heck. The women had covered their lip plates with scarves. (Photo from 1931)

By late morning, the number of visitors had already reached approximately 20,000, and by 5:15 p.m.—at which time the ticket offices were closed—it had risen to 37,163. While everything proceeded quite calmly during the morning hours, a terrible crush developed in the afternoon around the Pescherähs [the contemporary term for the Kawesqar people]; indeed, some forty planks of the enclosure fence were smashed in, and the guards struggled mightily to maintain any semblance of order. However, when the Fuegians retreated into the inner chambers of their earthen dwelling at 5:30 p.m., the tumult assumed alarming proportions. "Out with the Fuegians!" roared a chorus of a thousand voices. Benches and chairs were smashed, and only with the aid of requisitioned police officers was order finally restored, whereupon the crowd dispersed around 7 p.m.

The anatomist and anthropologist Rudolf Virchow conducted his own examinations of the ten Kawesqar at the Berlin Zoo and presented his findings on November 14, 1881, during a well-attended lecture before the Berlin Society for Anthropology, Ethnology, and Prehistory in the hall of the Zoological Garden, presenting them as a "race" on the "lowest rung" and potential cannibals. During his lecture, he made the remark: "Unfortunately, there is a severe shortage of Tierra del Fuego skulls." One of the last "ethnographic shows" held at the Berlin Zoo was the Sara-Kaba Show organized by Willy Siebold, which ran from April 22 to mid-May 1931.

=== Third Reich ===
In 1938, the Berlin Zoo got rid of Jewish board members and forced Jewish shareholders to sell their stocks at a loss, before re-selling the stocks in an effort to Aryanize the institution. Starting in 1939, Jews were also prevented from visiting the zoo. Zoo director Lutz Heck was named chief of the Oberste Naturschütz Behörde im Reichsforstamt (highest nature preservation agency in the state department of forestry) by his friend Hermann Göring in the summer of 1938 and in this capacity he was the senior responsible person for the entire nature management.

=== World War II ===
During World War II, the zoo area was hit by Allied bombs for the first time on 8 September 1941. Most damage was done during the bombardments on 22 and 23 November 1943.

In less than 15 minutes, 30% of the zoo population was killed on the first day, and on the second day the aquarium building was completely destroyed by a direct hit. Of the eight elephants, only one survived, the bull Siam; two-year-old hippo bull Knautschke was saved from the gunfire in his animal house. Most damage was done during the Battle of Berlin: from 22 April 1945 onwards, the zoo was under constant artillery fire of the Red Army. Heavy fighting took place in the zoo area through 30 April, and safety measures forced the zoo keepers to kill some predators and other dangerous animals.

Next to the zoo stood the Zoo Tower, a huge flak tower that was one of the last remaining areas of Nazi German resistance against the Red Army, with its bunkers and anti-aircraft weapons defending against Allied air forces. At the entrance of the zoo, there was a small underground shelter for zoo visitors and keepers. During the battle, wounded German soldiers were taken care of here by female personnel and the wives of zookeepers. On 30 April, the zoo flak bunker surrendered.

A count on 31 May 1945 revealed only 91 of 3,715 animals had survived, including two lion cubs, two hyenas, Asian bull elephant Siam, hippo bull Knautschke, ten hamadryas baboons, a chimpanzee, and a black stork. After the battle, some animals had escaped, while some of the killed animals were subsequently eaten by Red Army soldiers.

Following the zoo's destruction, it and the associated aquarium were reconstructed on modern principles so as to display the animals in as close to their natural environment as then feasible. The success in breeding animals, including some rare species, demonstrates the efficacy of these new methods.

=== Postwar period ===
The zoo is located in what became West Berlin, hence a second zoo—Tierpark Berlin—was built in the East. There was virtually no public attention paid to the zoo's Third Reich history until 2000, when Werner Cohn, whose father was a former shareholder, wrote to enquire about the fate of those shares. The zoo initially denied that Jewish shareholders were forced to sell their shares, but as a public scandal ensued, it ultimately acknowledged this. It commissioned a historian to identify these past shareholders and track down their descendants, according to a report by AFP.

== Zoo ==
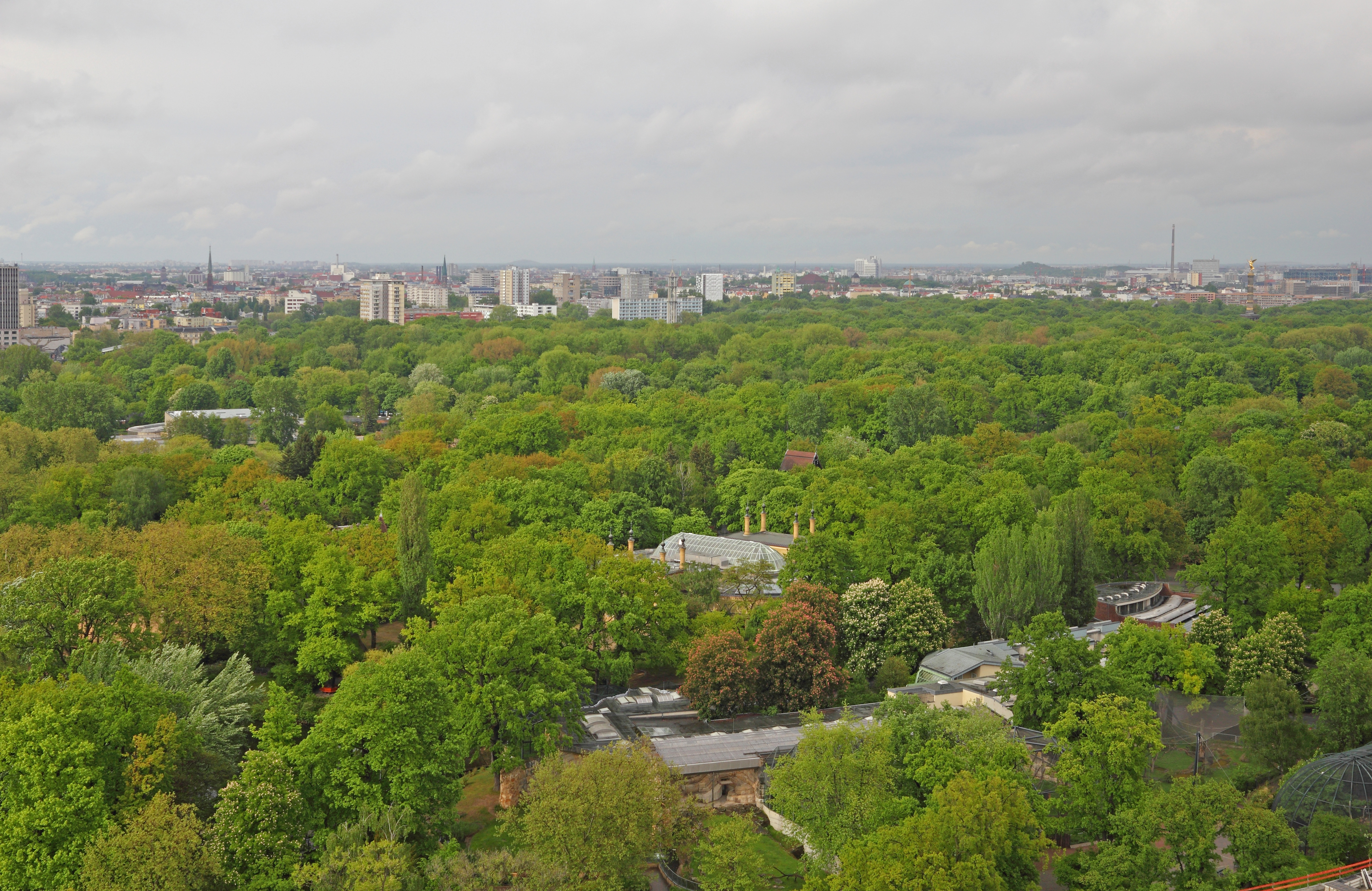
View of Berlin Zoo from Kaiser Wilhelm Memorial Church

Group	Species	Animals
Mammals	169	1,044
Birds	319	2,092
Reptiles	69	357
Amphibians	54	639
Fish	562	7,629
Invertebrates	331	8,604
Total (2013)	1,504	20,365

The Berlin Zoo is the most visited zoo in Europe, with more than 3.3 million visitors per year from all over the world. It is open all year long and can be reached easily by public transportation. The Berlin Zoologischer Garten railway station (also simply known as Zoo) is one of Berlin's most important stations. Several modes of transport such as U-Bahn, S-Bahn and buses are interlinked here.

Visitors can either enter the zoo through the exotically designed Elephant Gate beside the aquarium on Budapester Straße or through the Lion Gate on Hardenbergplatz. The original Elephant Gate, built in 1899, was destroyed in World War II. It was faithfully reconstructed to original plans in 1984.

The zoo has always maintained an extensive and diverse collection. At the outbreak of World War II there were 4000 birds and mammals of 1400 species, while the aquarium held 8300 reptiles, amphibians and invertebrates of 750 species. In 2001, the combined collection numbered 14188 animals of 1517 species, similar to present. The number of larger animals displayed has gradually thinned as enclosures become increasingly designed to recreate natural habitat.

The zoo maintains studbooks for black and Indian rhinoceroses and gaurs. The populations of rare deer and pigs are part of several captive breeding projects. Berlin Zoo supports conservationists in other countries (for instance, in Madagascar) and as a partner of the Stiftung Artenschutz, a species protection foundation.

The zoo houses four types of great ape: orangutans, gorillas, chimpanzees, and bonobos.

The carnivore house displays all big cats and many rare small predators, such as ring-tailed mongooses and narrow-striped mongooses from Madagascar. In the basement, visitors are invited to a view into the world of nocturnal animals.

The bird house presents a walk-through aviary and offers a broad variety of forms, including several regularly breeding species of hornbills and many parrots. Numerous big aviaries show waders, herons and many other species. The Berlin Zoo is one of the few zoos to exhibit tuatara (in the aquarium) and Luzon tarictic hornbills.

== Aquarium ==
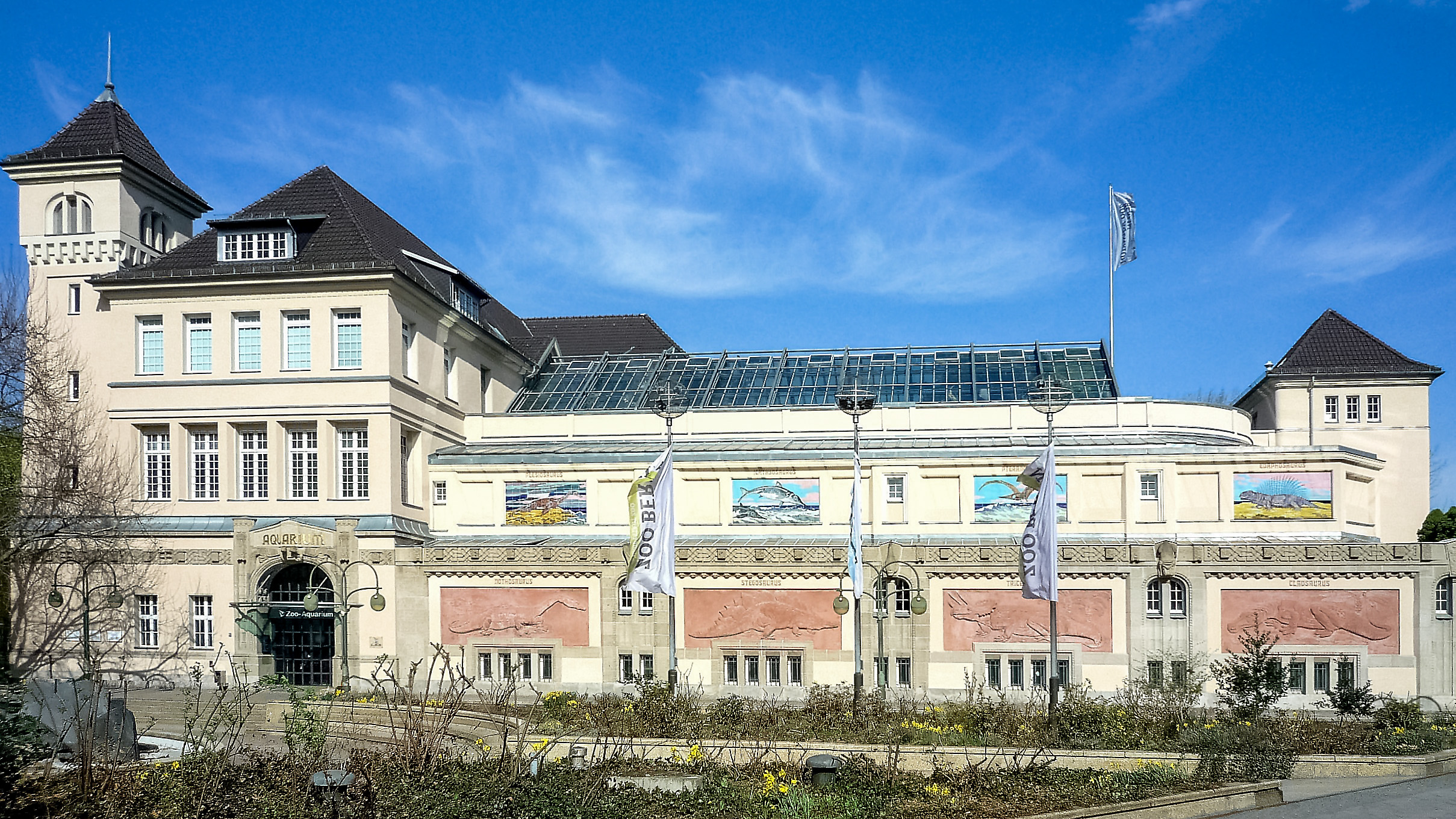
The aquarium has one of the largest collections of aquatic life in Europe.

The aquarium was built in 1913 as part of the Zoologischer Garten complex. In addition to fish and other aquatic life, it is home to most of the zoo's reptiles, amphibians and invertebrates.

== Animals ==
Polar bear Knut was born at the zoo on 5 December 2006. He and his twin were directly rejected by their mother shortly after birth. He was subsequently raised by zookeeper Thomas Dörflein and became the center of a mass media phenomenon that spanned the globe, quickly spawning numerous toys, media specials, DVDs, books and other merchandise. Because of this, the cub was largely responsible for a significant increase in revenue, estimated at five million euros, at Berlin Zoo in 2007. Zoo attendance figures for the year increased by an estimated 30%, making it the most profitable year in its 165-year history. Knut died on 19 March 2011 after collapsing in his exhibit.

Bao Bao (1978–2012) was one of the first two giant pandas in Germany and became – for a time – the oldest known panda in captivity. He was housed together with the female panda Tjen Tjen (who died in 1984), given to West Germany by China in 1980. Between 1991 and 1993, Bao Bao was loaned to London Zoo. In 1995, back in his Berlin home, another female named Yan Yan was sent on loan from China in an attempt to mate with Bao Bao. In spite of several artificial insemination experiments, Bao Bao and Yan Yan produced no cubs. Yan Yan died in 2007. In summer 2017, giant pandas returned to Berlin Zoo, when Jiao Quing and Meng Meng arrived on a breeding loan from China. In September 2019, Meng Meng gave birth to twin male panda cubs, Pit und Paule. On 22 August 2024, Meng Meng gave birth to another pair of twin panda cubs, this time two females.

Fatou the female gorilla was born on 13 April 1957. She came to the zoo at an estimated age of two. In 1974, she gave birth to the first gorilla to be raised in Berlin, Dufte. Since the death of Colo in January 2017, she is the oldest living gorilla in captivity of the world (now together with American gorilla Trudy).

Pang Pha (born ca. 1987) is an Asian elephant at the Zoo who is known for peeling bananas with her trunk. It is not known how common this behavior is, although online videos have shown other elephants with similar abilities.

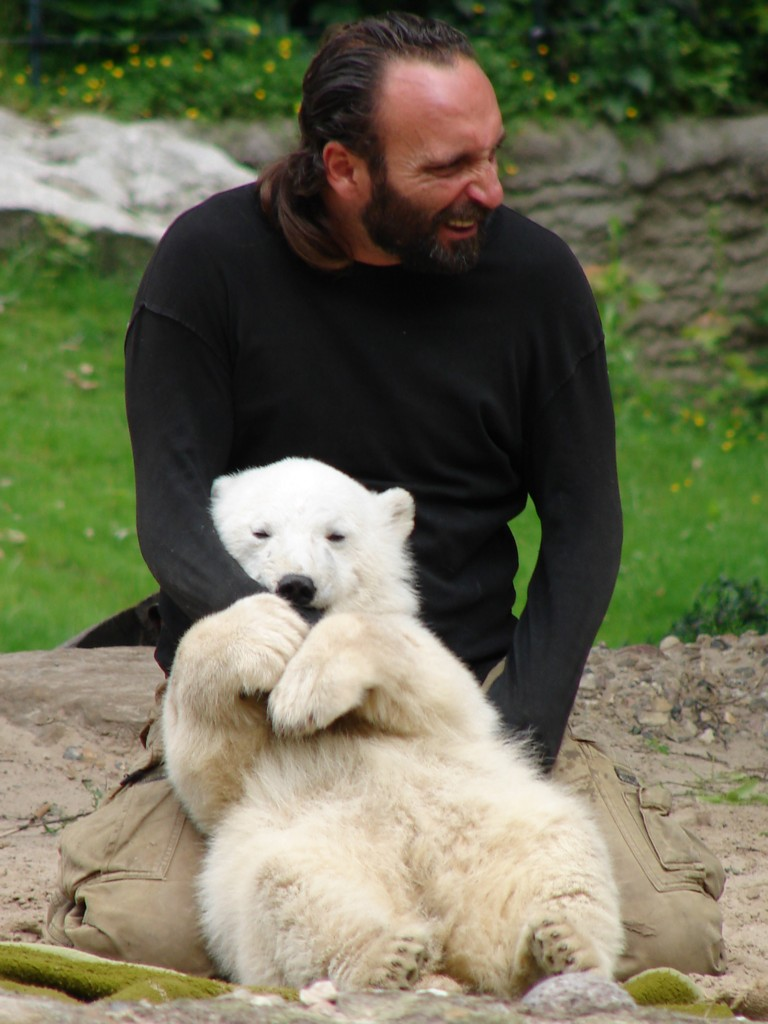
Knut and his keeper Thomas Dörflein

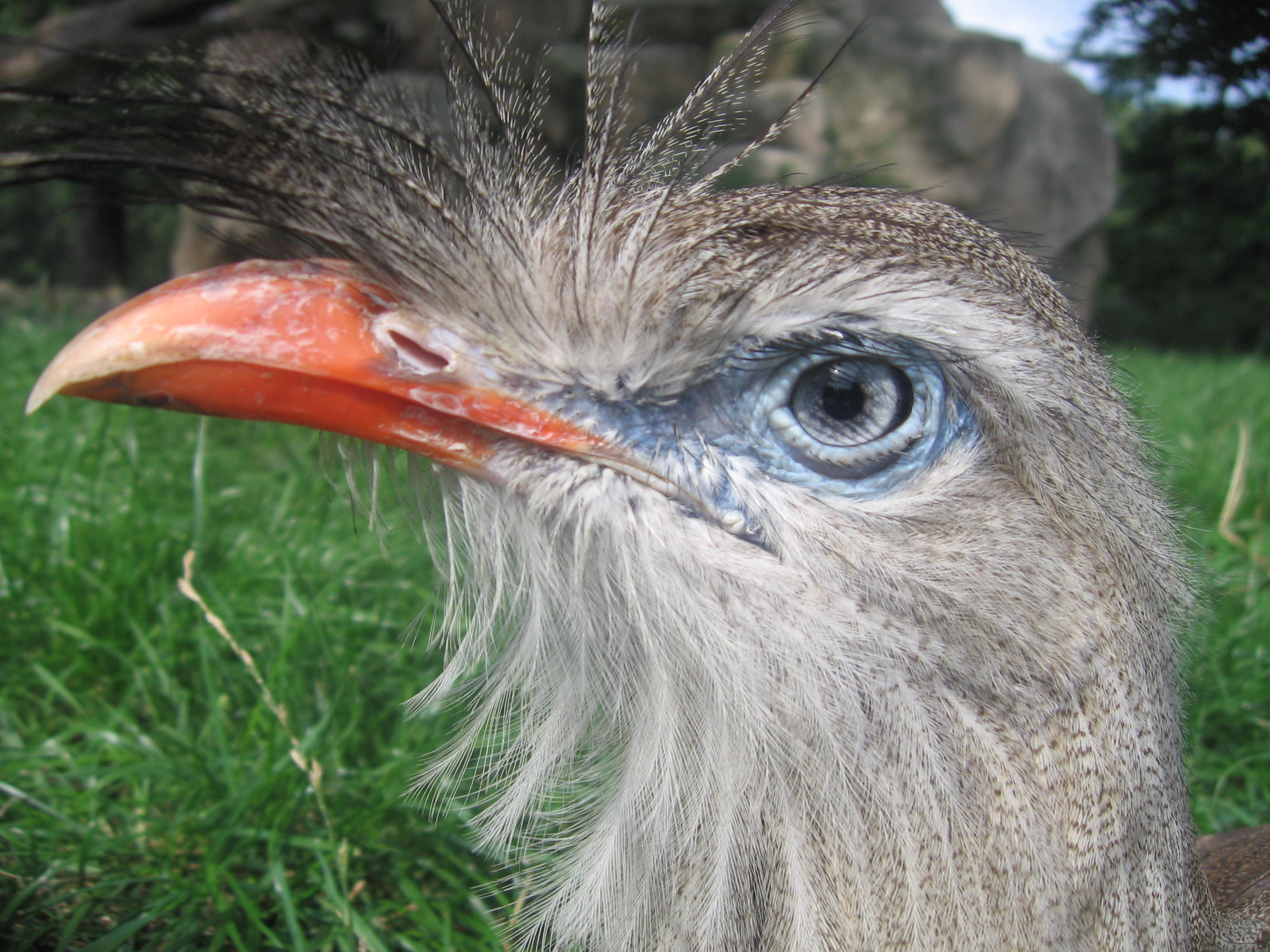
Red-legged seriema

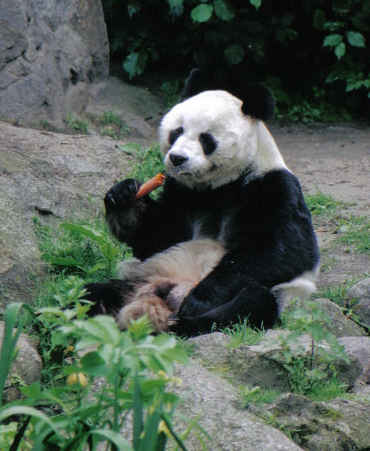
Giant panda Bao Bao

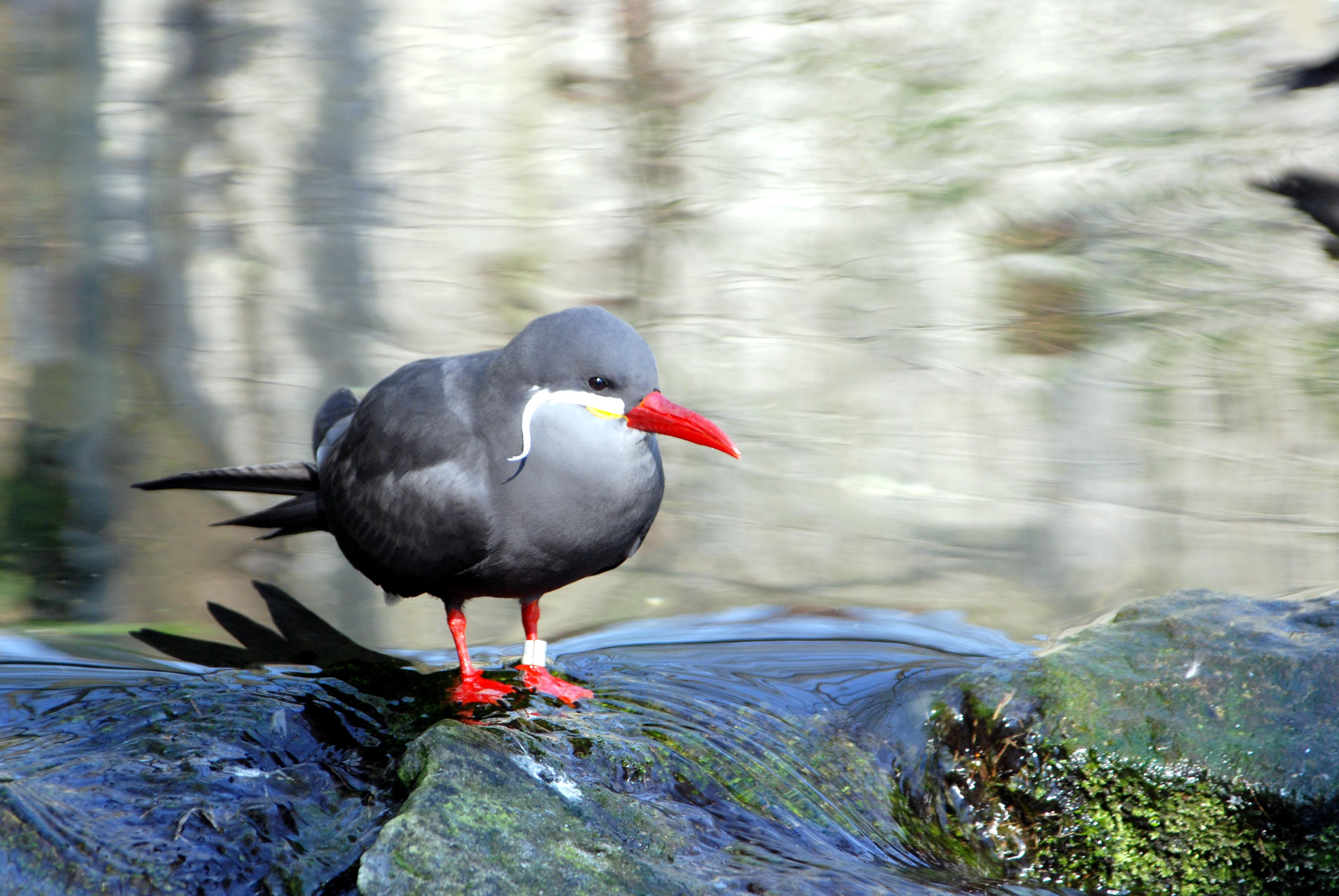
Inca tern

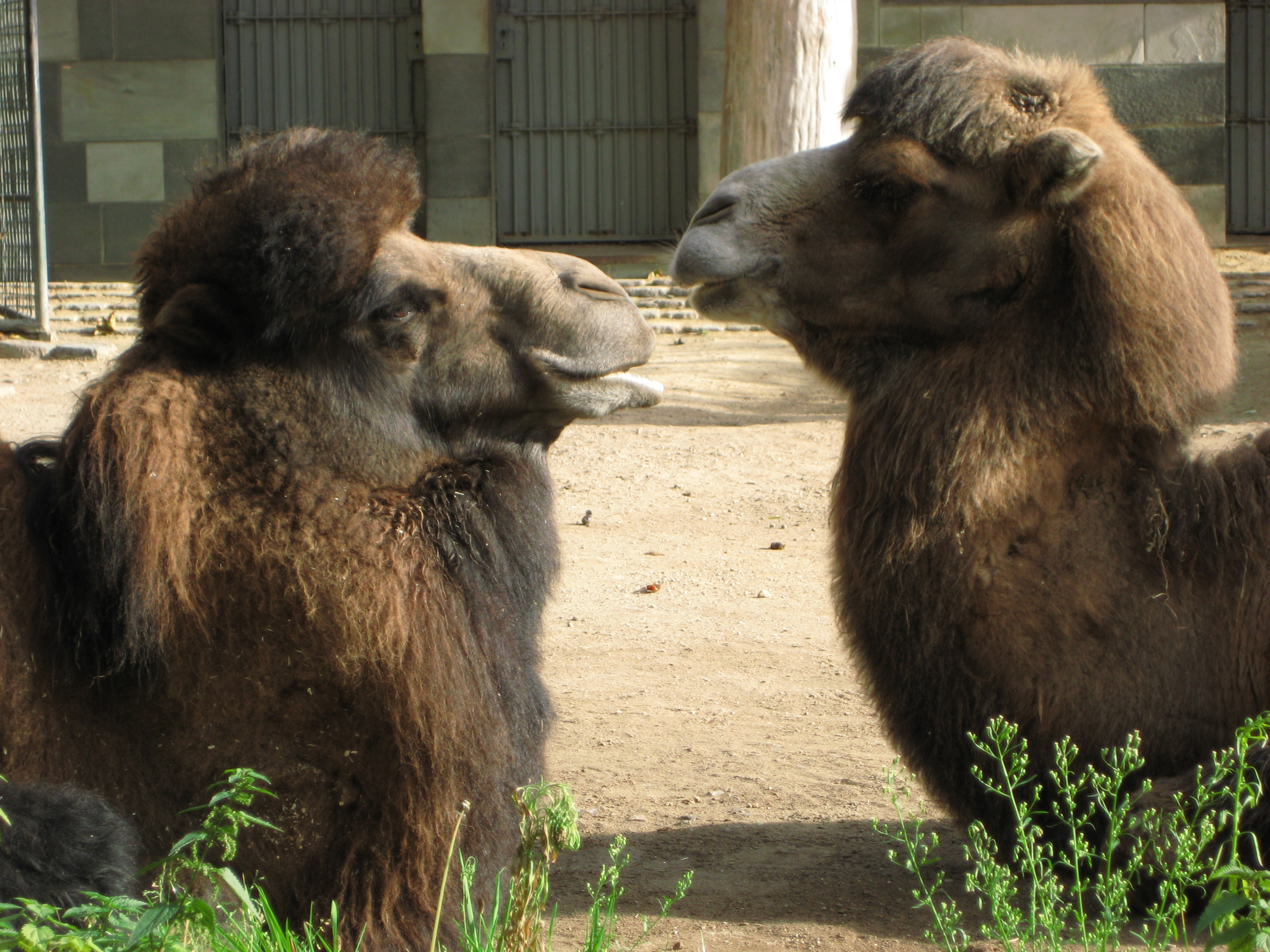
Bactrian camel

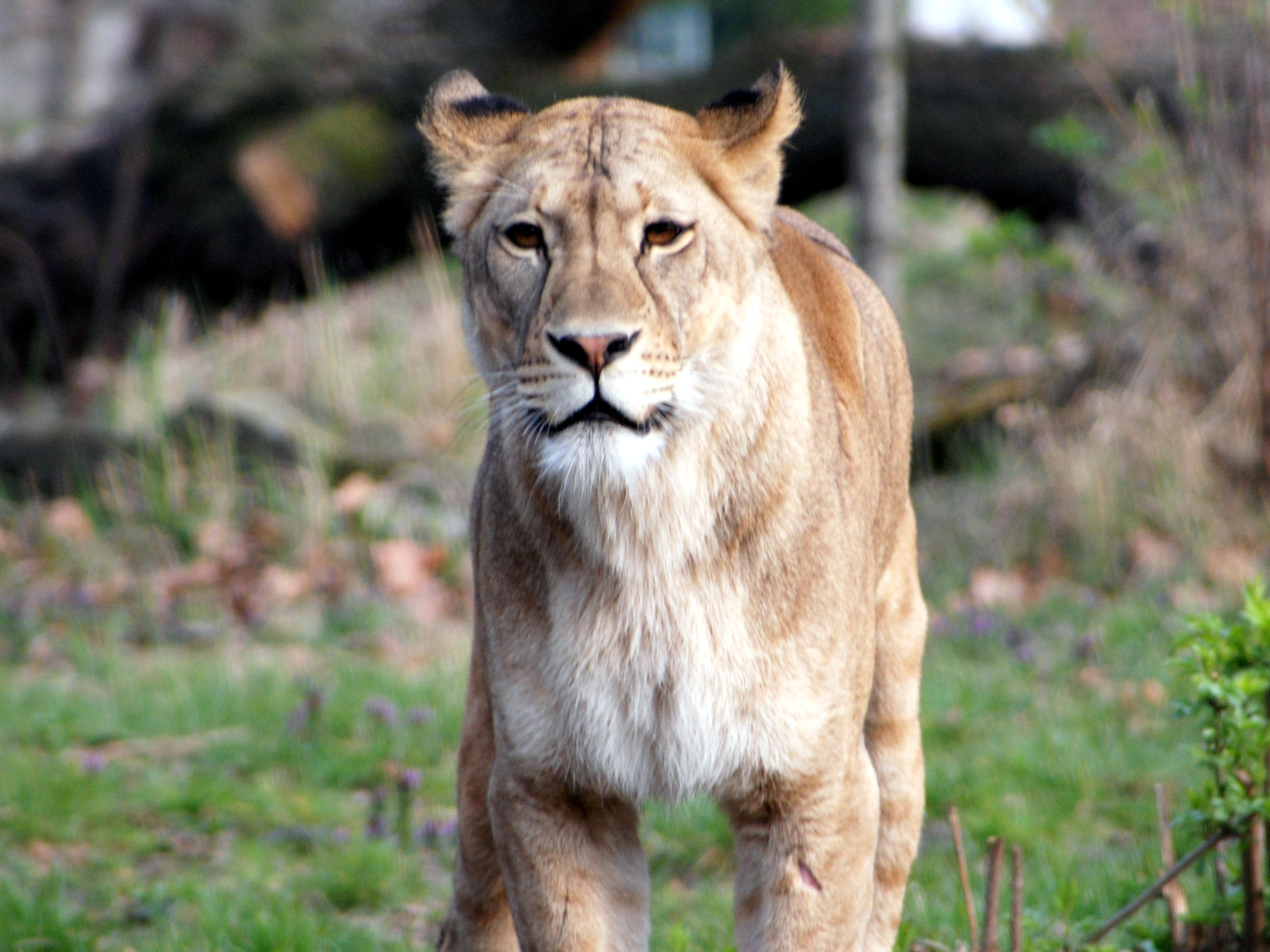
Lion

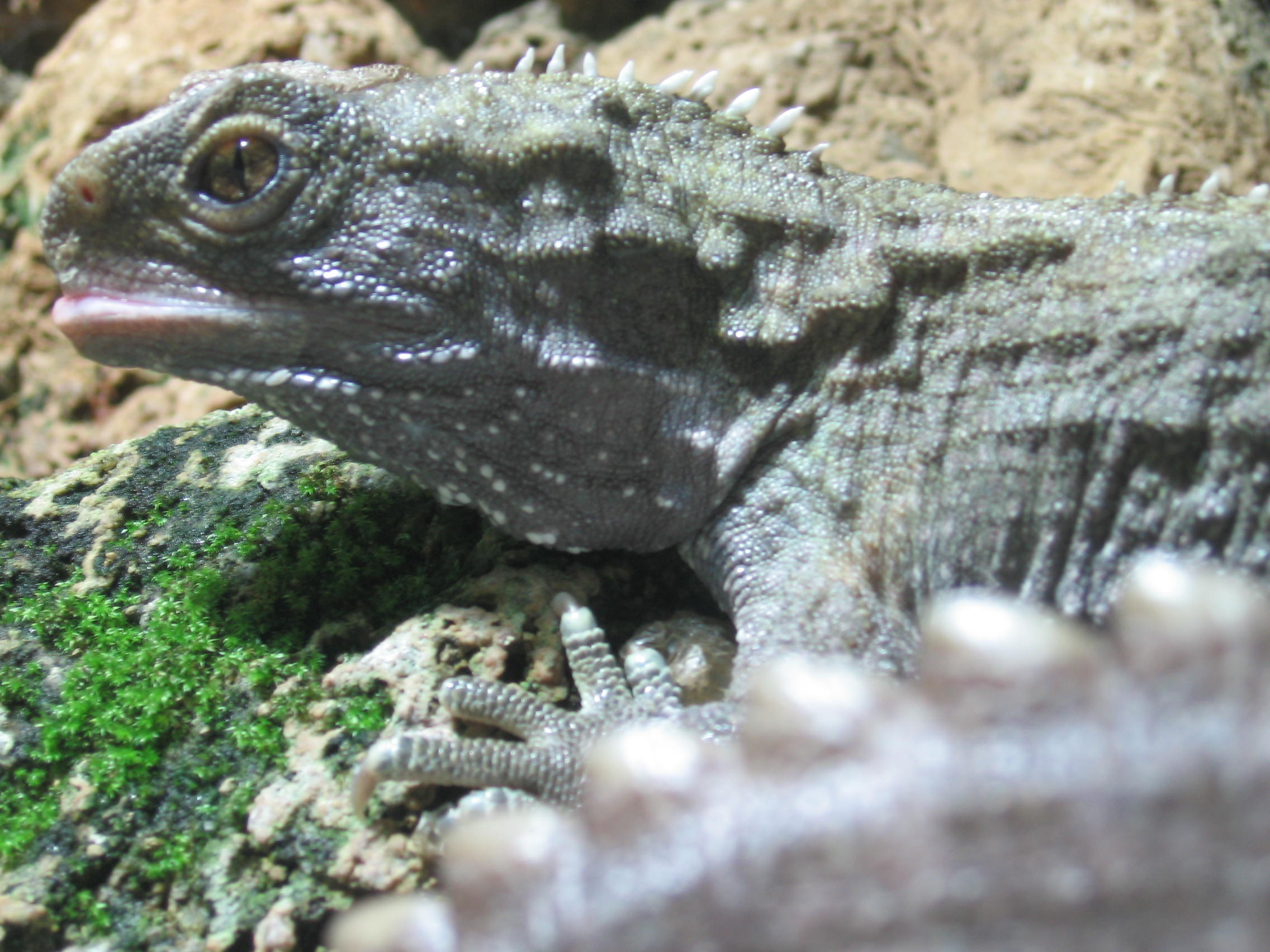
Tuatara

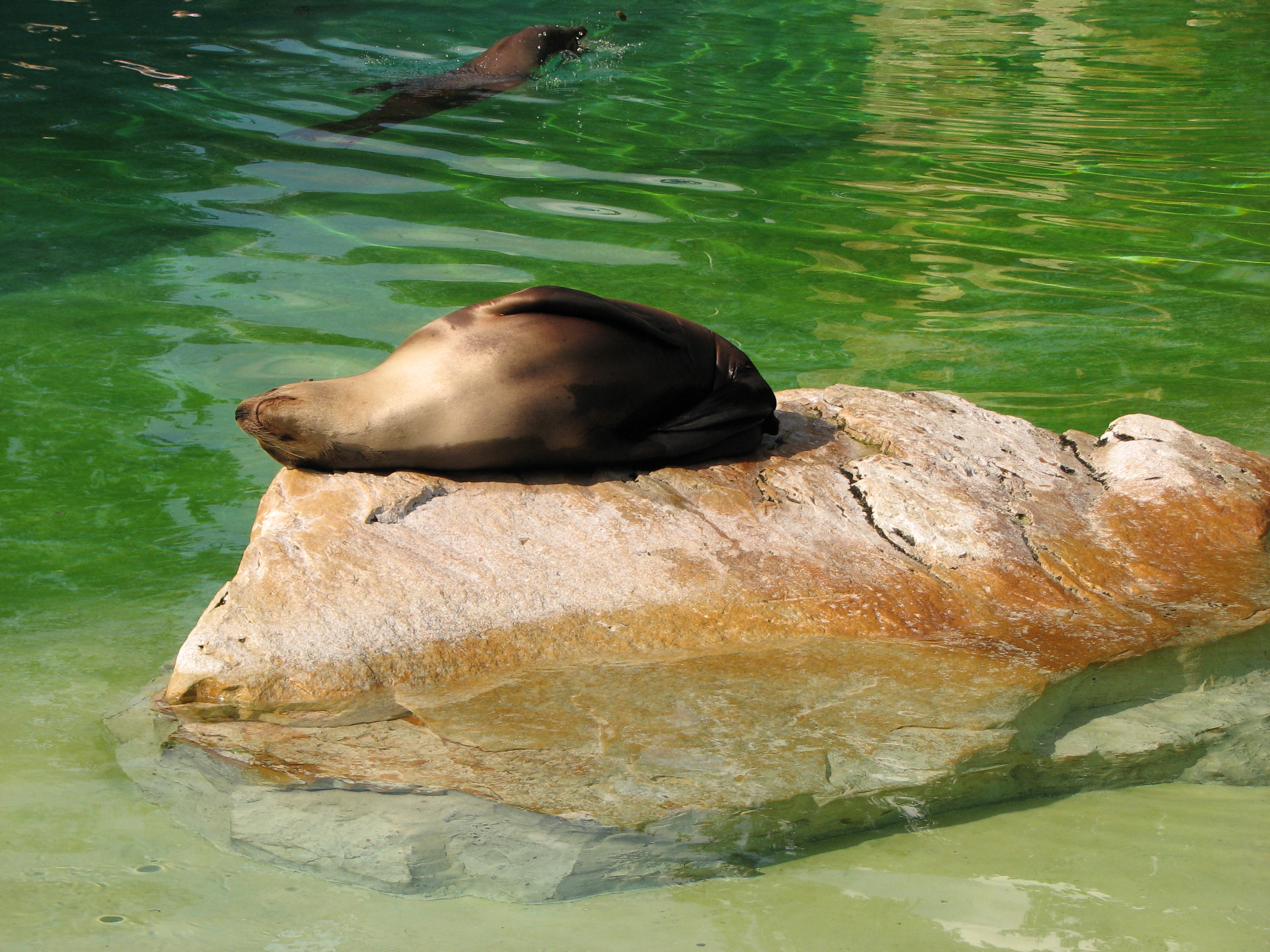
Brown fur seal

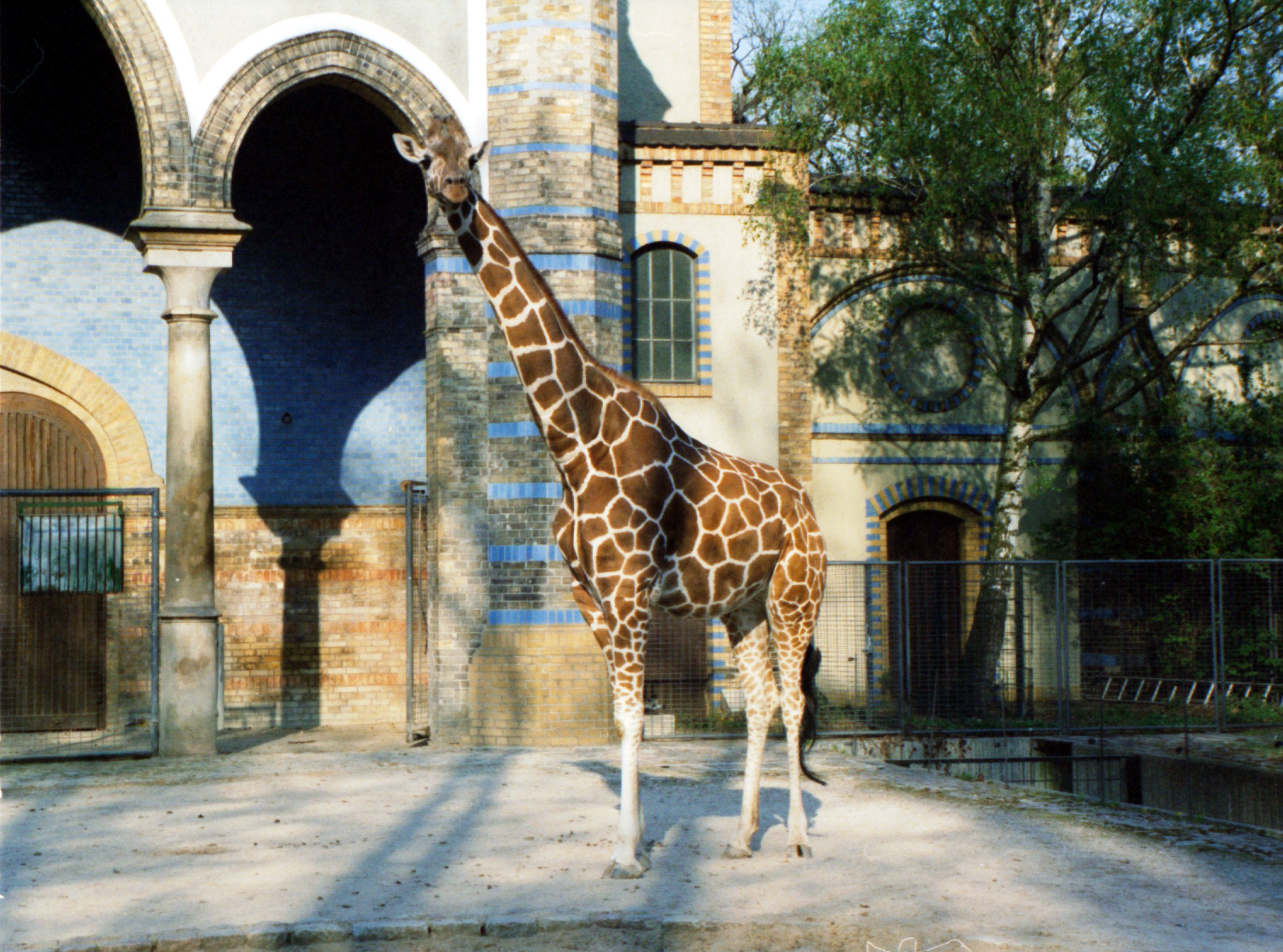
Giraffe

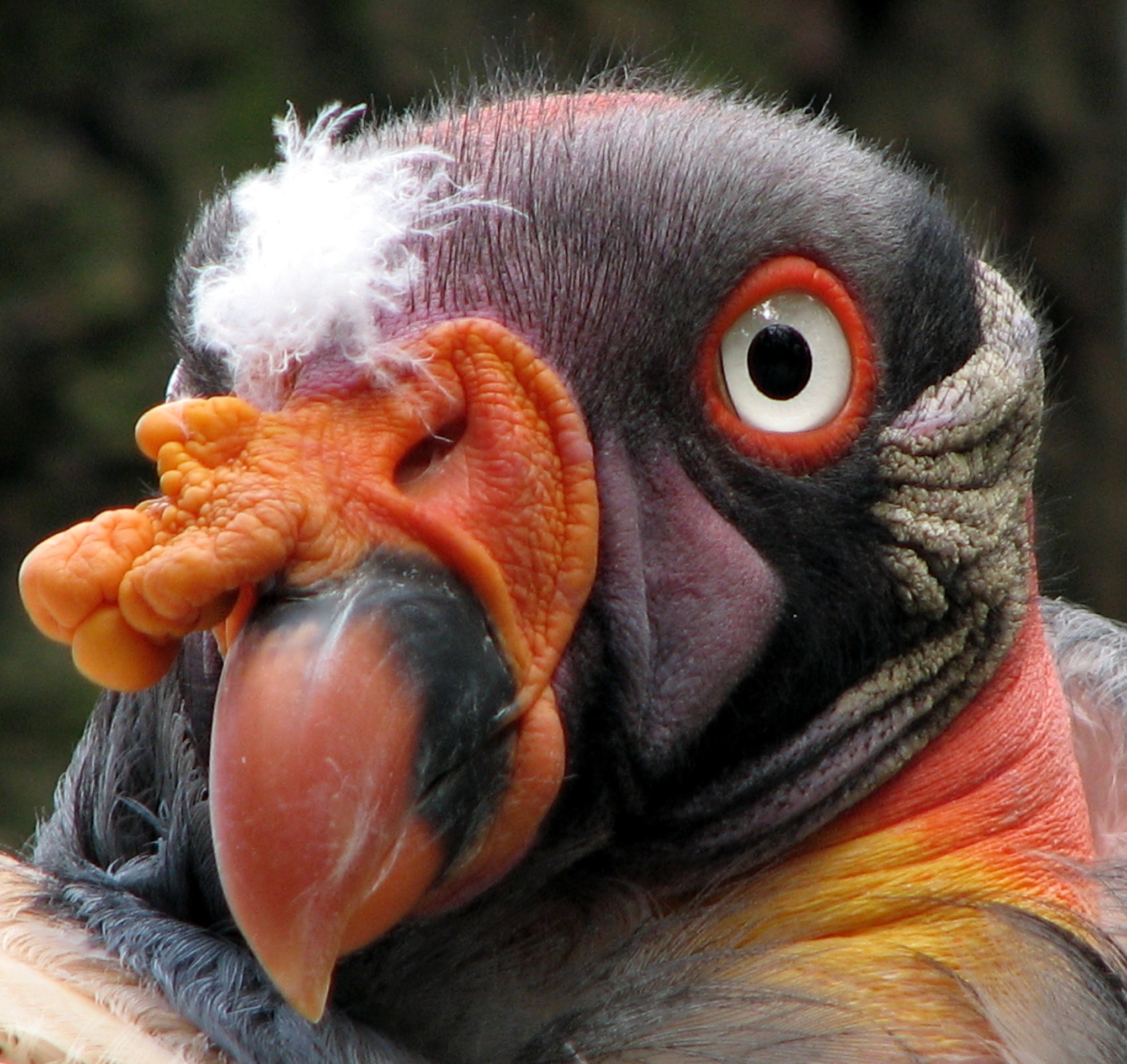
King vulture

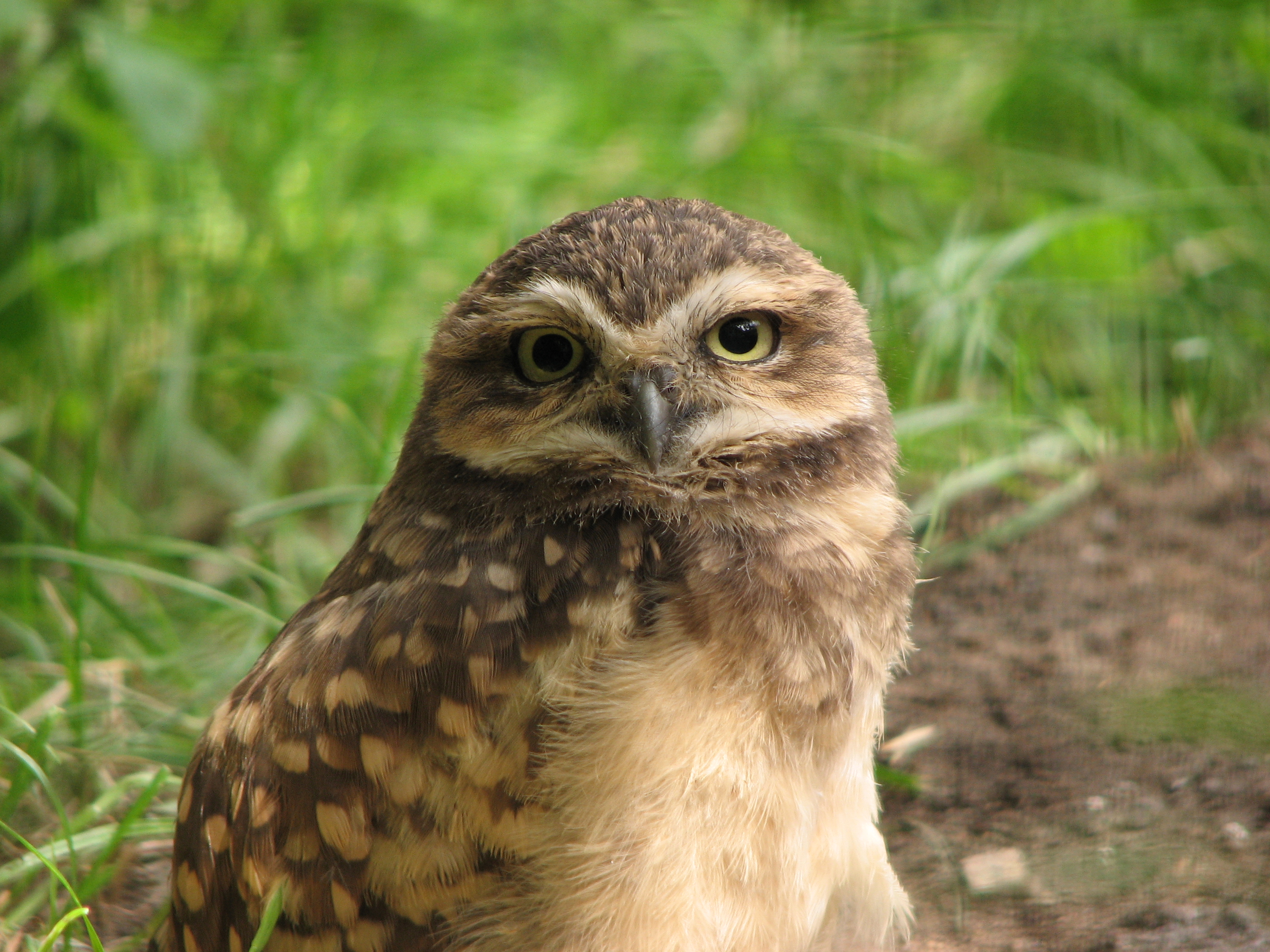
Burrowing owl

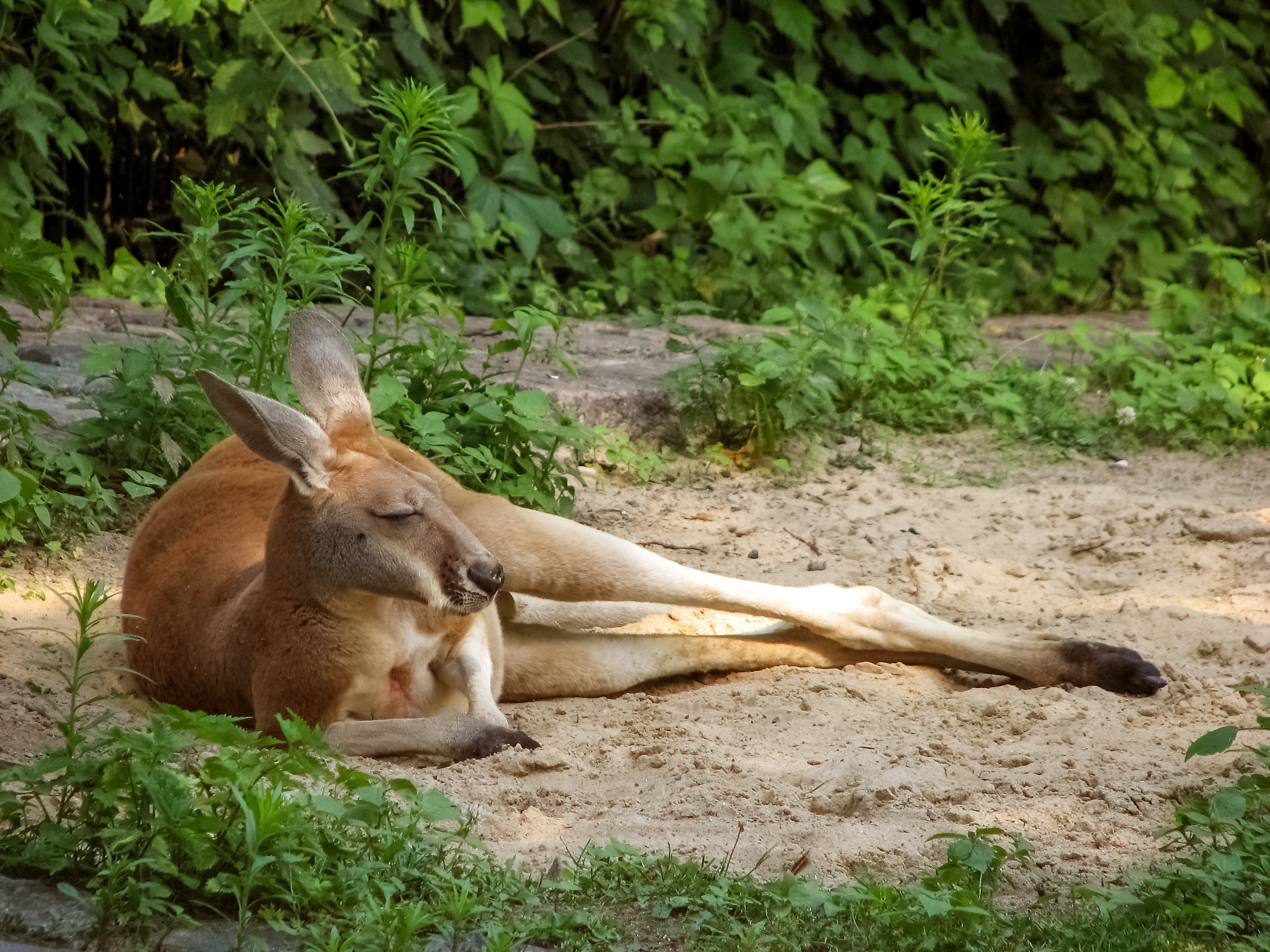
Red kangaroo

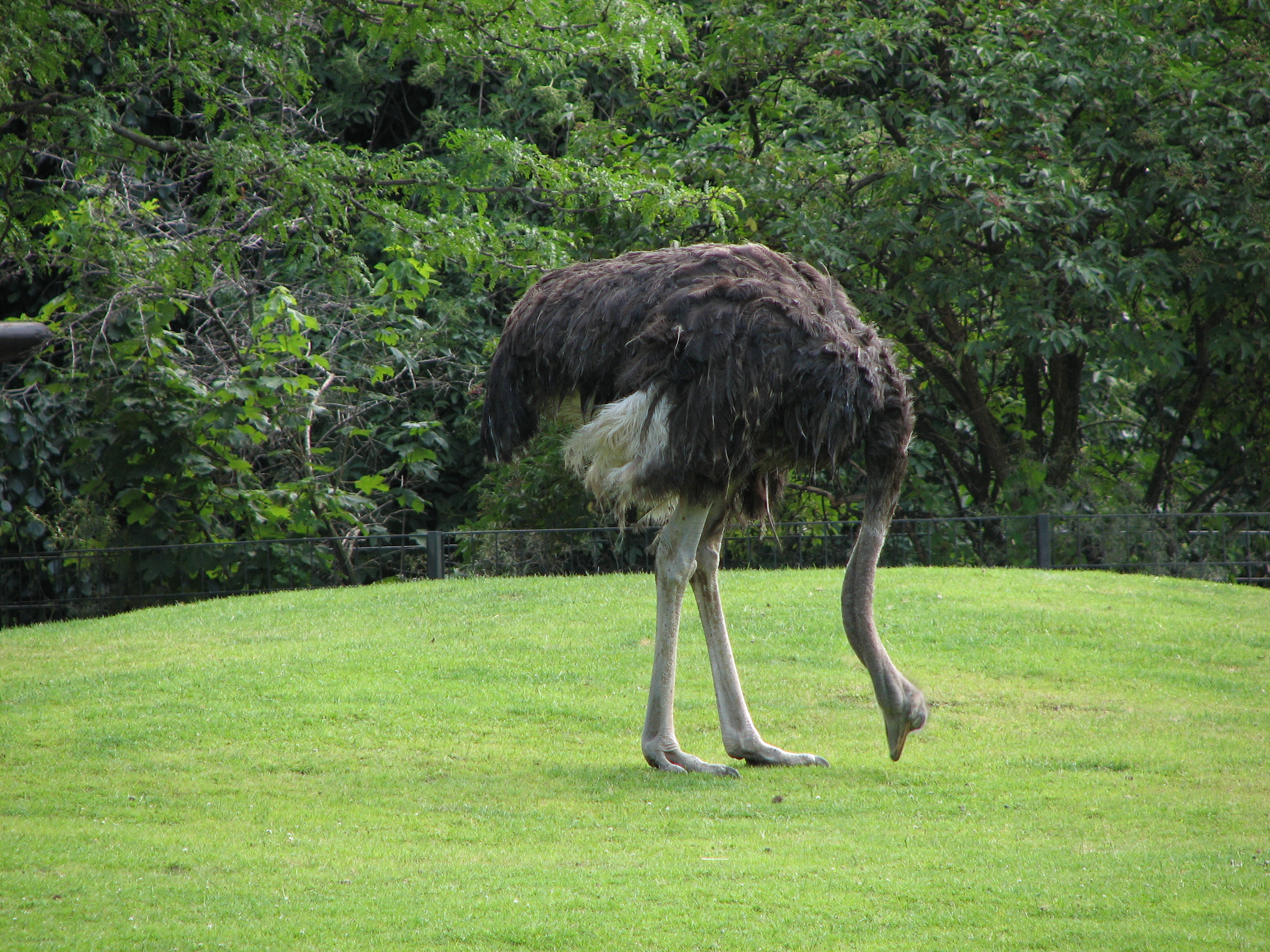
Southern ostrich

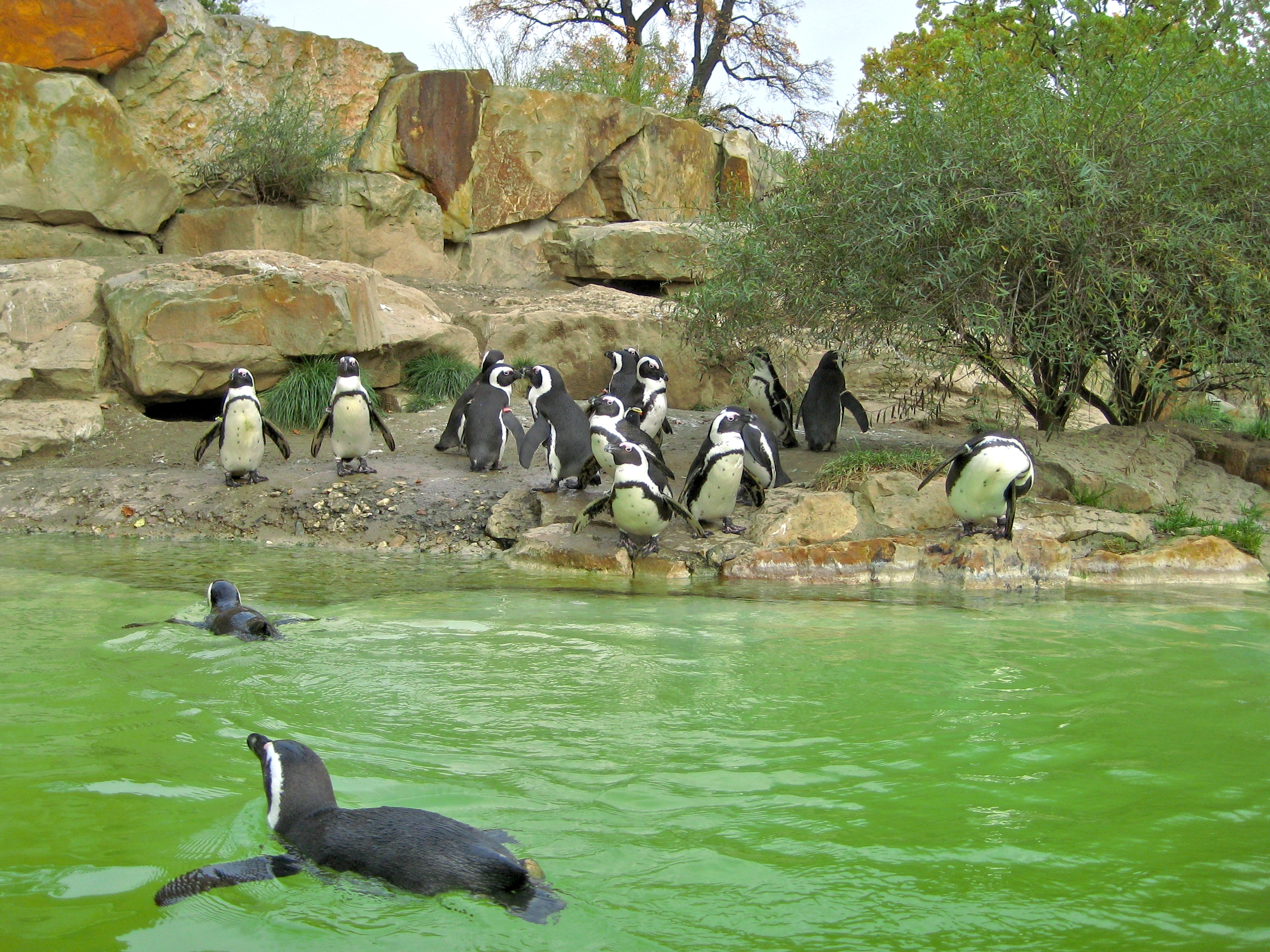
Penguins

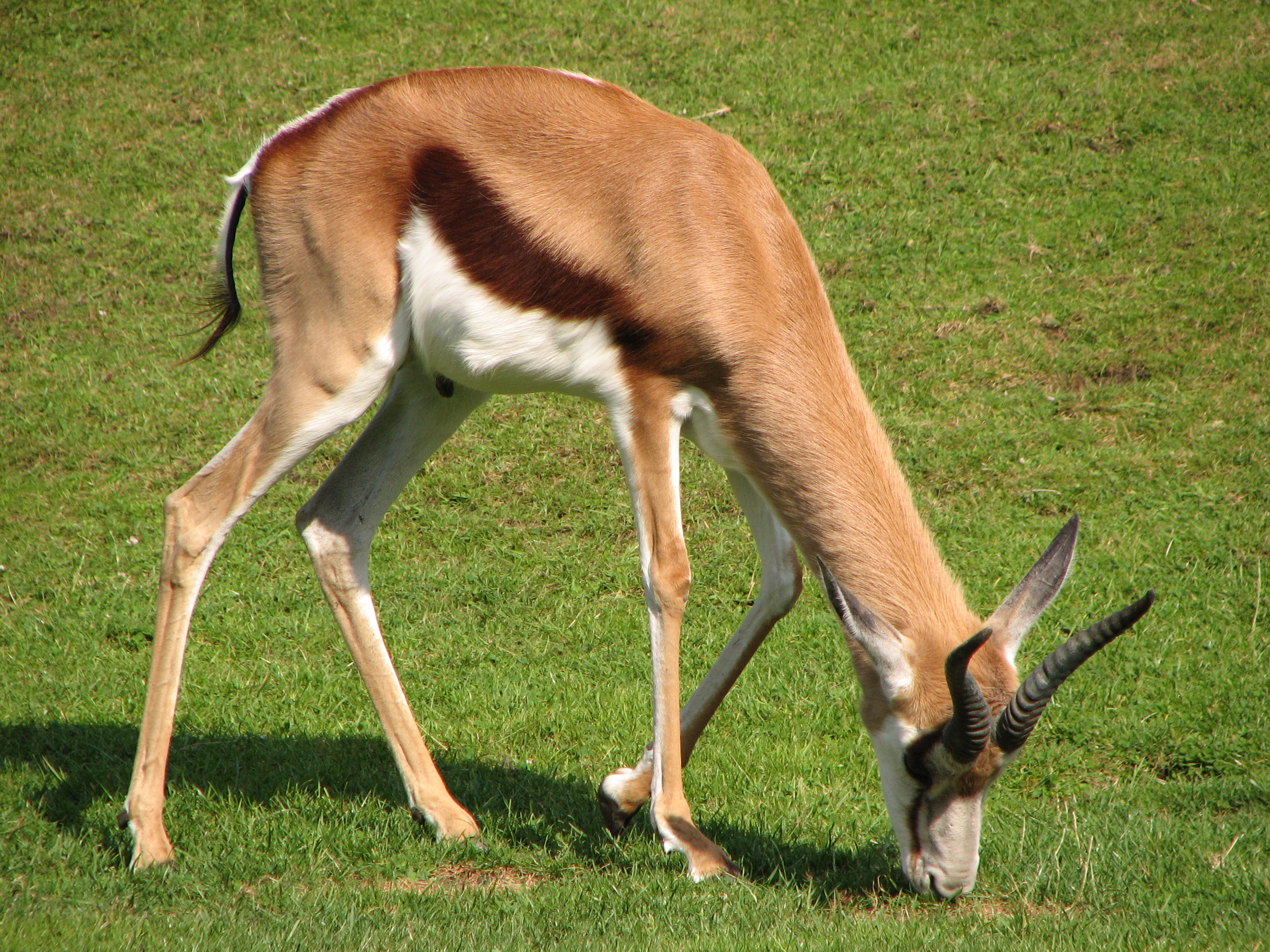
Springbok

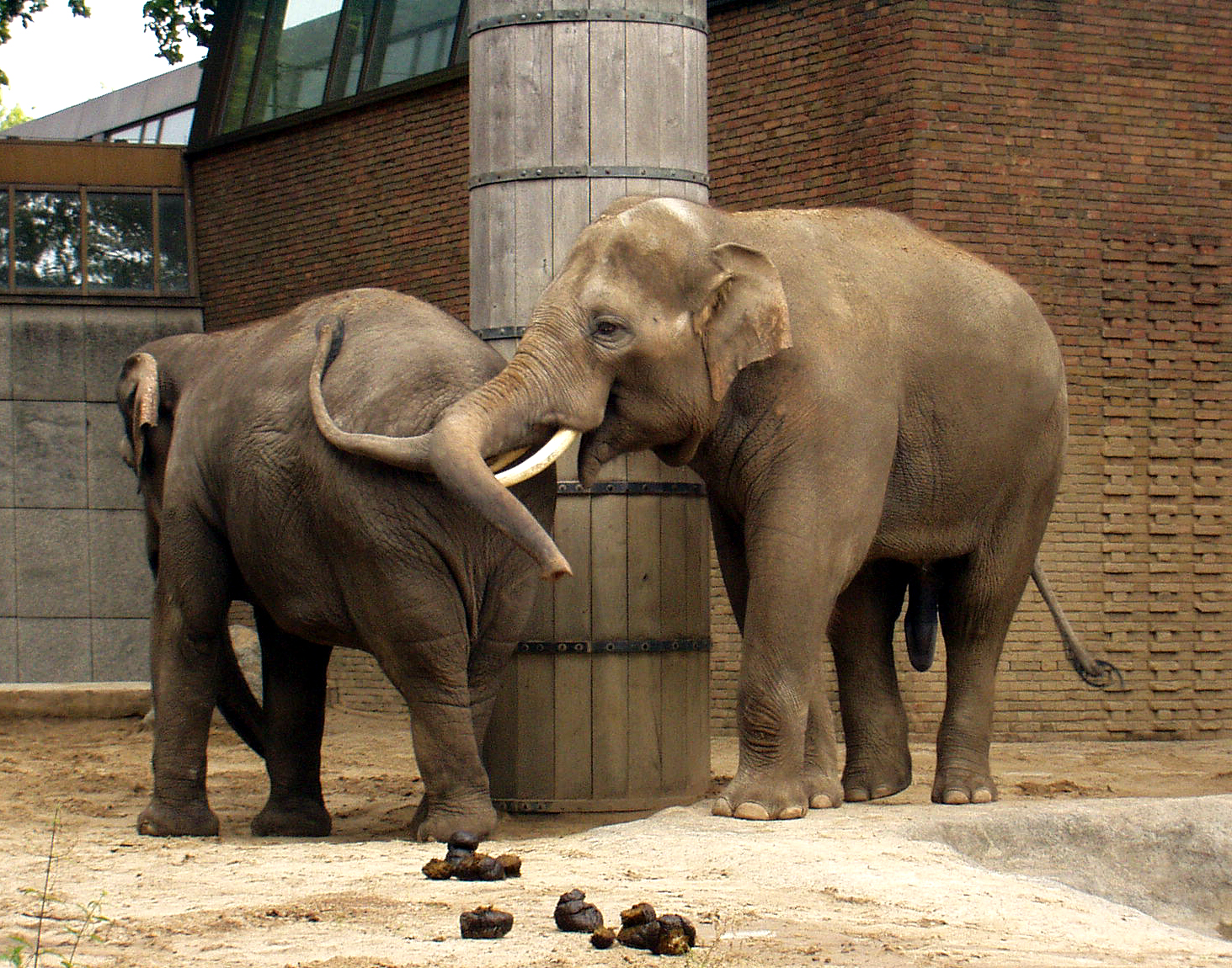
Asian elephant

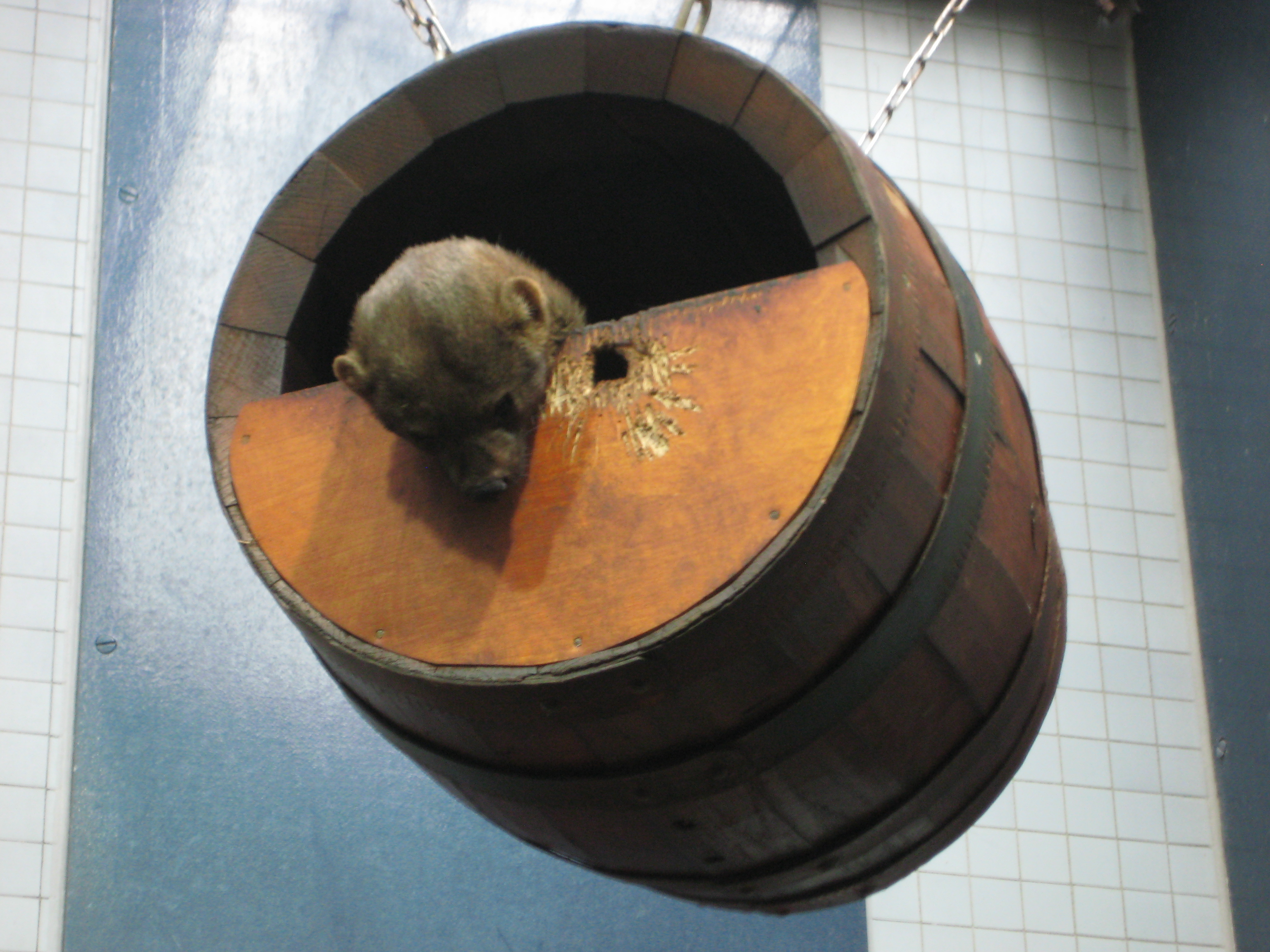
Tayra

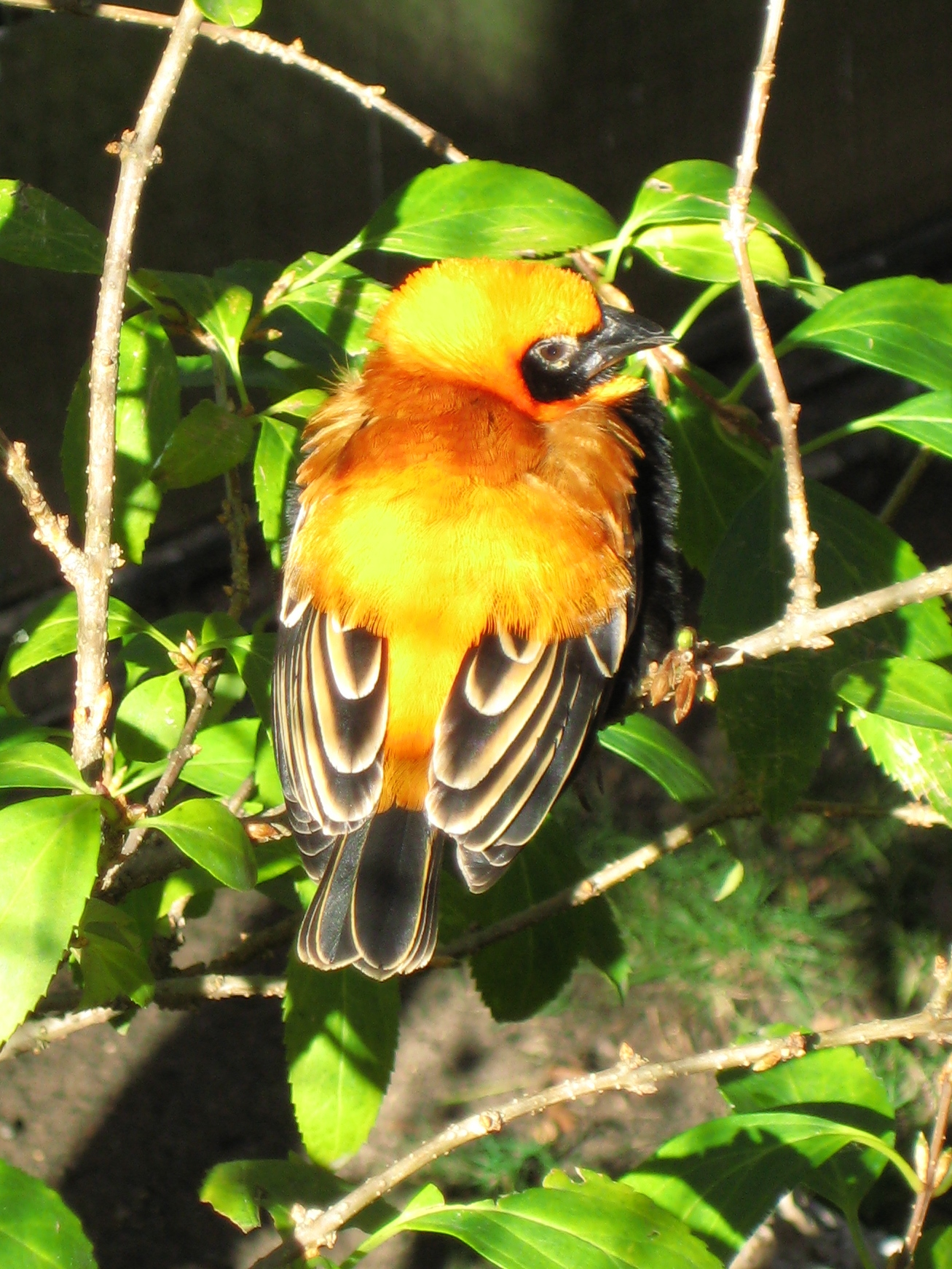
Black-winged red bishop

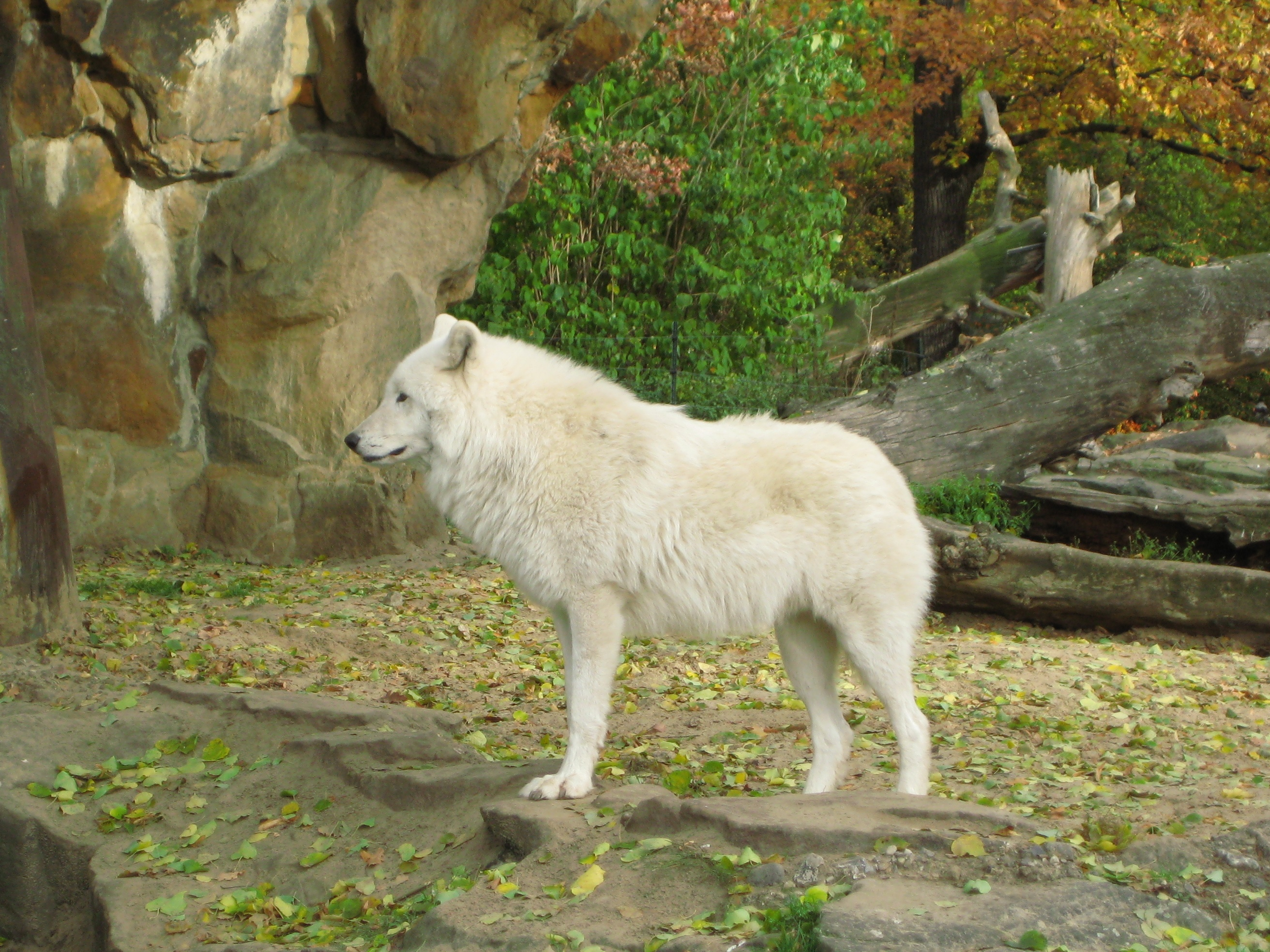
Arctic wolf

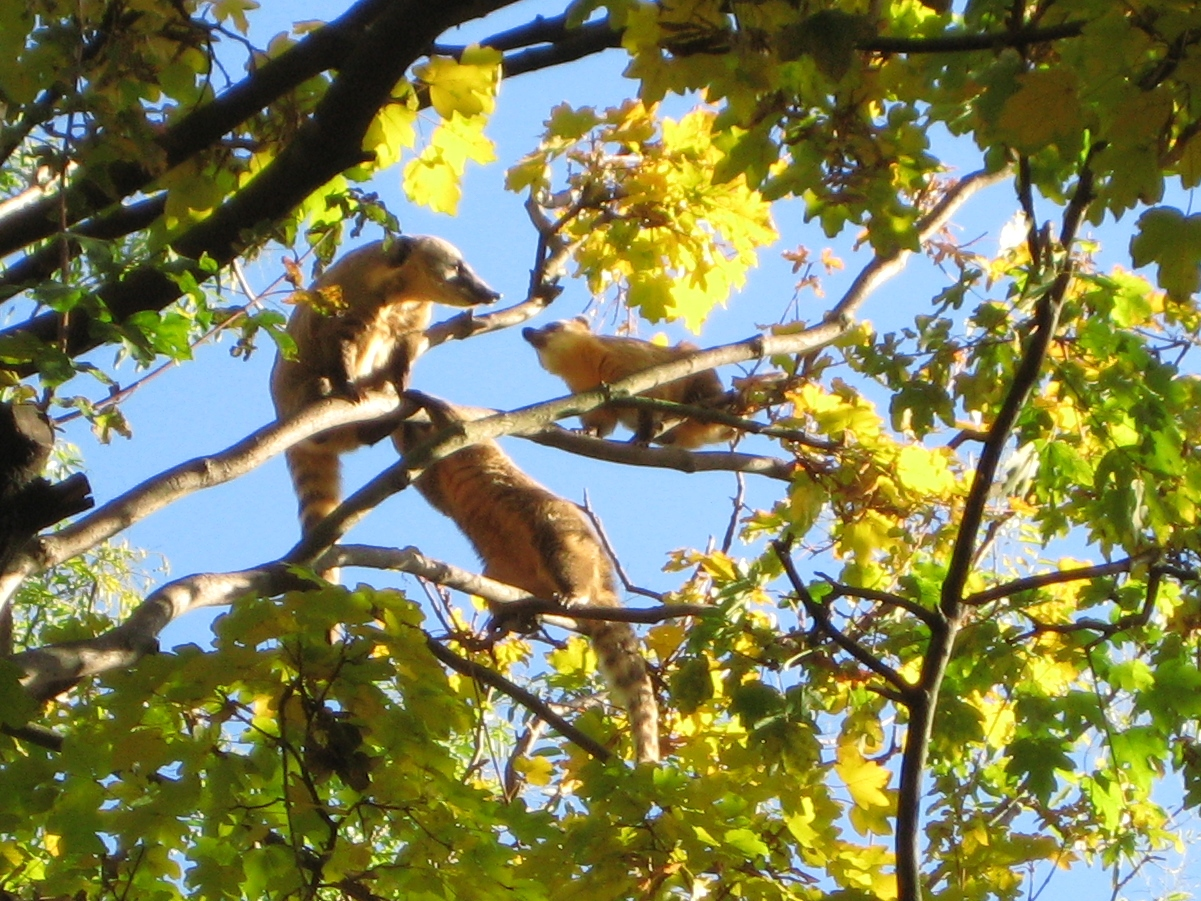
South American coati

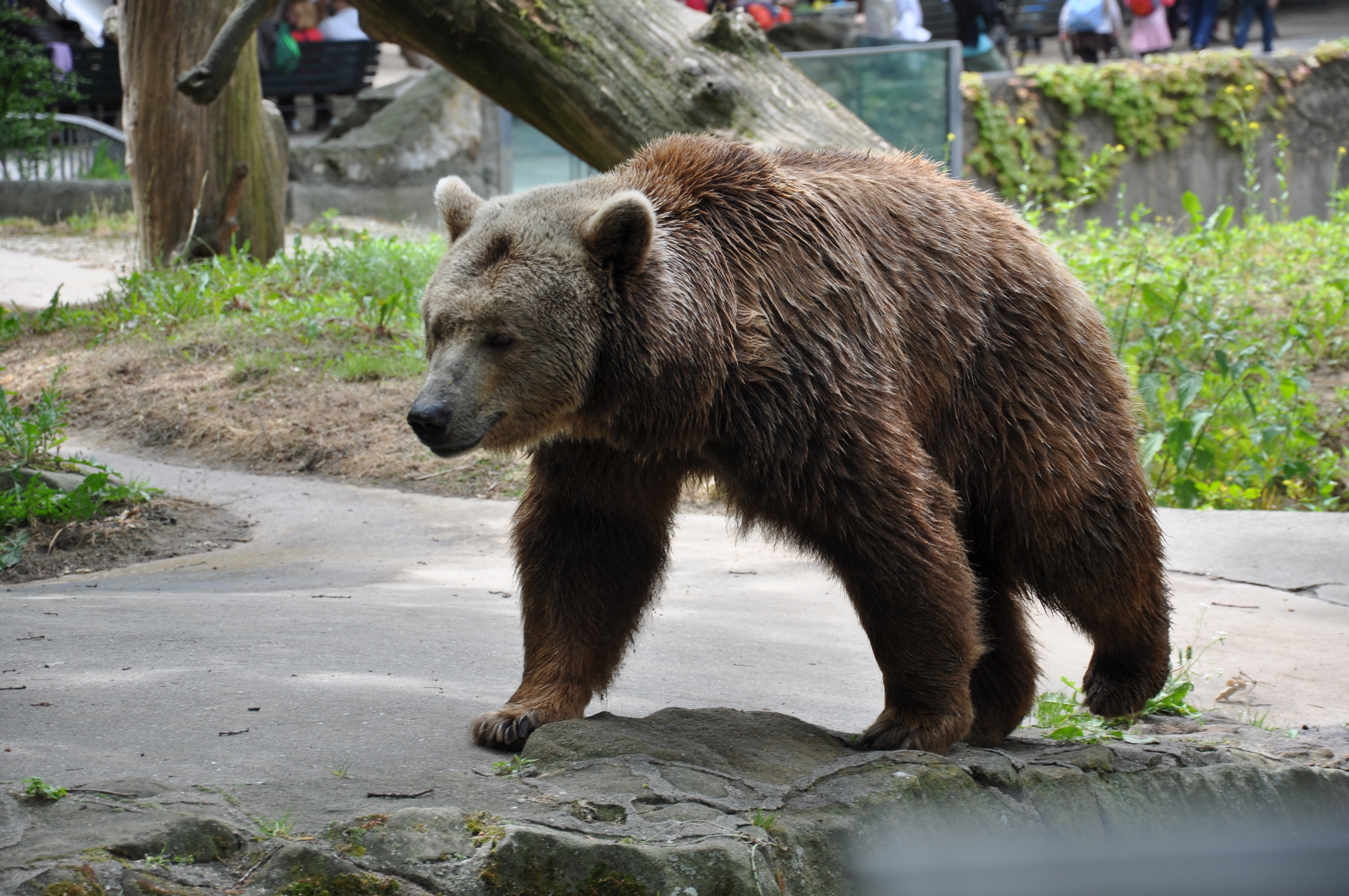
Brown bear

== Incidents / Criticism ==
In 2008, Claudia Hämmerling, a Green Party MP, accused the zoo director, Bernhard Blaszkiewitz (also the director of Tierpark Berlin), of selling hundreds of animals for slaughter, in some cases to breeders in China for potency-boosting drugs. The same year, Blaszkiewitz admitted to breaking the necks of several feral domestic housecat kittens found at the zoo.

On April 13, 2009, a 32-year-old woman identified as Mandy K. was mauled by polar bears after jumping into their exhibit. She was rushed to the hospital and survived. The woman had reportedly jumped into the enclosure in an attempt to take her own life, after losing her job and her lover.

In 2023, employees from the zoo's education department made serious allegations of exploitation and disrespect. They also criticised the fact that quality in the area of education was no longer a priority, although this is one of the main tasks of a scientifically working zoo. These accusations highlighted problems within the organisation and led to a wave of terminations by the zoo and resignations from dissatisfied employees. As a result, the original team was reduced to around a third of its previous size. These staffing shortages forced the management to limit the offers of guided tours.

== See also ==
- List of zoos in Germany
- List of tourist attractions in Berlin
- Zoo flak tower, built in 1941, demolished in 1947
