= Tom (Spanish TV series) =

- Also known as: Tom, The Greatest Friend
- Based on: Tom by Daniel Torres
- Countries of origin: Spain; France; United Kingdom; Germany
- Original languages: Spanish; French; English; German

Production
- Production companies: Cromosoma; Norma Editorial; Marathon Media; Pesky; Trickompany Filmproduktion

Original release
- Network: TVE2 (Spain); CBBC (United Kingdom); France 3 (France); ZDF (Germany)
- Release: 2003

Tom or Tom, The Greatest Friend is a 2003 Spanish children's television animated cartoon series produced by the European Broadcasting Union (EBU), Cromosoma and Norma Editorial which was subsequently broadcast in several European countries.

The show follows the adventures of the titular character, Tom, who is the last remaining dinosaur, as he travels around the world with a friendly circus. It also depicts the efforts of two inept criminals, Weedon and Hatch, to kidnap Tom for their boss, the cunning and greedy Mr Carter.

In terms of animation, the series primarily employed 2D techniques for characters and most scenes, while 3D models were used for chase sequences and occasional landscape shots.
