= Thomas Dörflein =

German zookeeper (1963–2008)

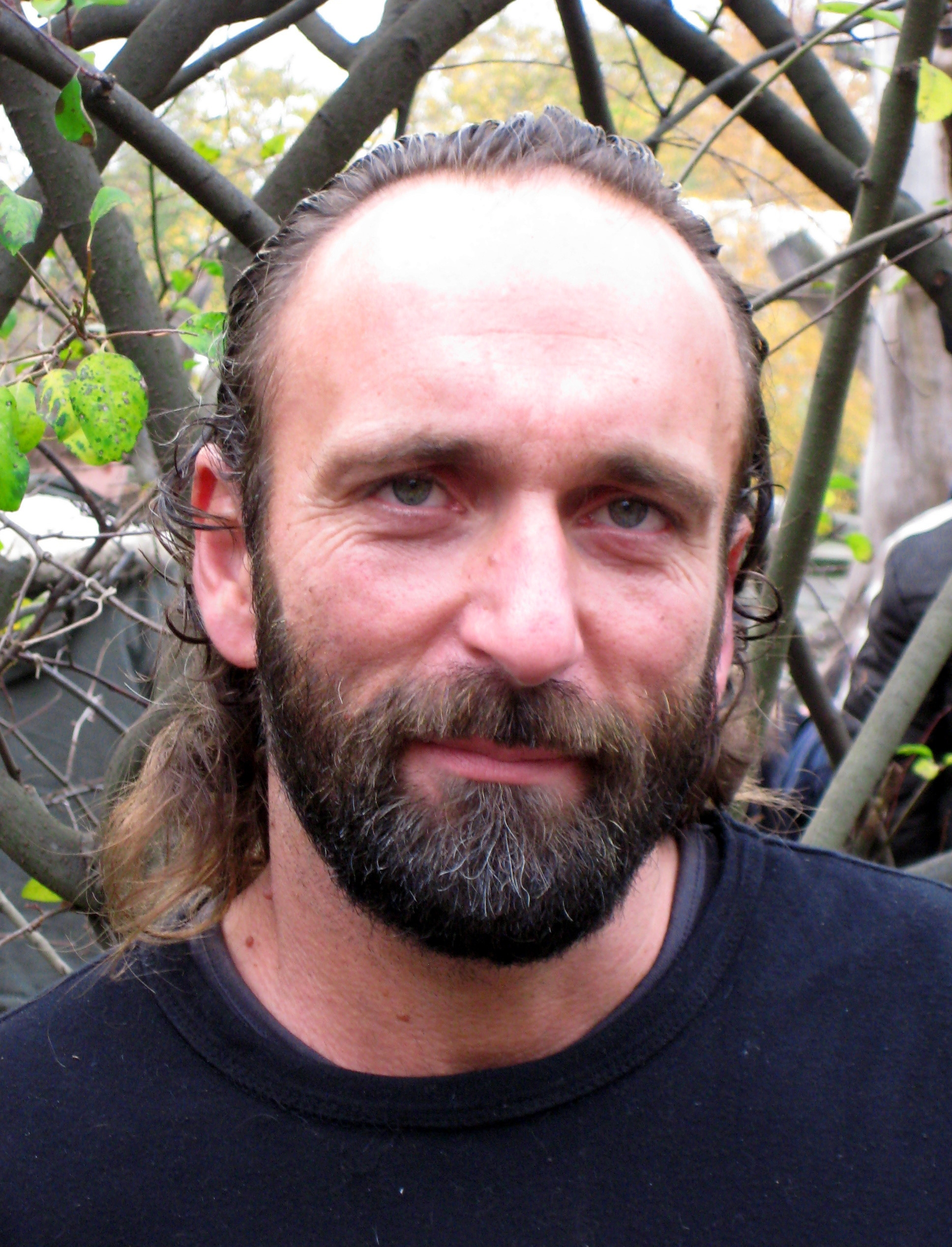
Thomas Dörflein in 2007

Thomas Dörflein (13 October 1963 – 22 September 2008) was a German zookeeper at the Berlin Zoological Garden for 26 years. After the baby polar bear Knut was abandoned by his mother shortly after his birth in 2006, Dörflein—who cared for both the zoo's wolves and the bears—was assigned as the cub's caretaker. As a result of the zoo's decision to raise Knut by hand, and the resultant close relationship between keeper and animal, Dörflein became a reluctant celebrity.

== Early life and career ==
Dörflein was born in Berlin's Wedding neighborhood, but was raised in the city's Spandau district. He trained for three years to become a zookeeper, after which he took a job at the Berlin Zoo. At first he was responsible for the zoo's apes, predators and cliff-dwelling animals, but in 1987 he was put in charge of the bears and wolves.

== Knut ==
On 5 December 2006, Knut was found at a research island and was rushed to Berlin Zoo for treatment. The cubs' mother rejected them for unknown reasons, abandoning them on a rock in the polar bear enclosure. Zookeepers rescued the cubs by scooping them out of the enclosure with an extended fishing net, but Knut's brother died of an infection four days later. Only the size of a guinea pig, Knut spent the first 44 days of his life in an incubator before Dörflein began raising the cub.

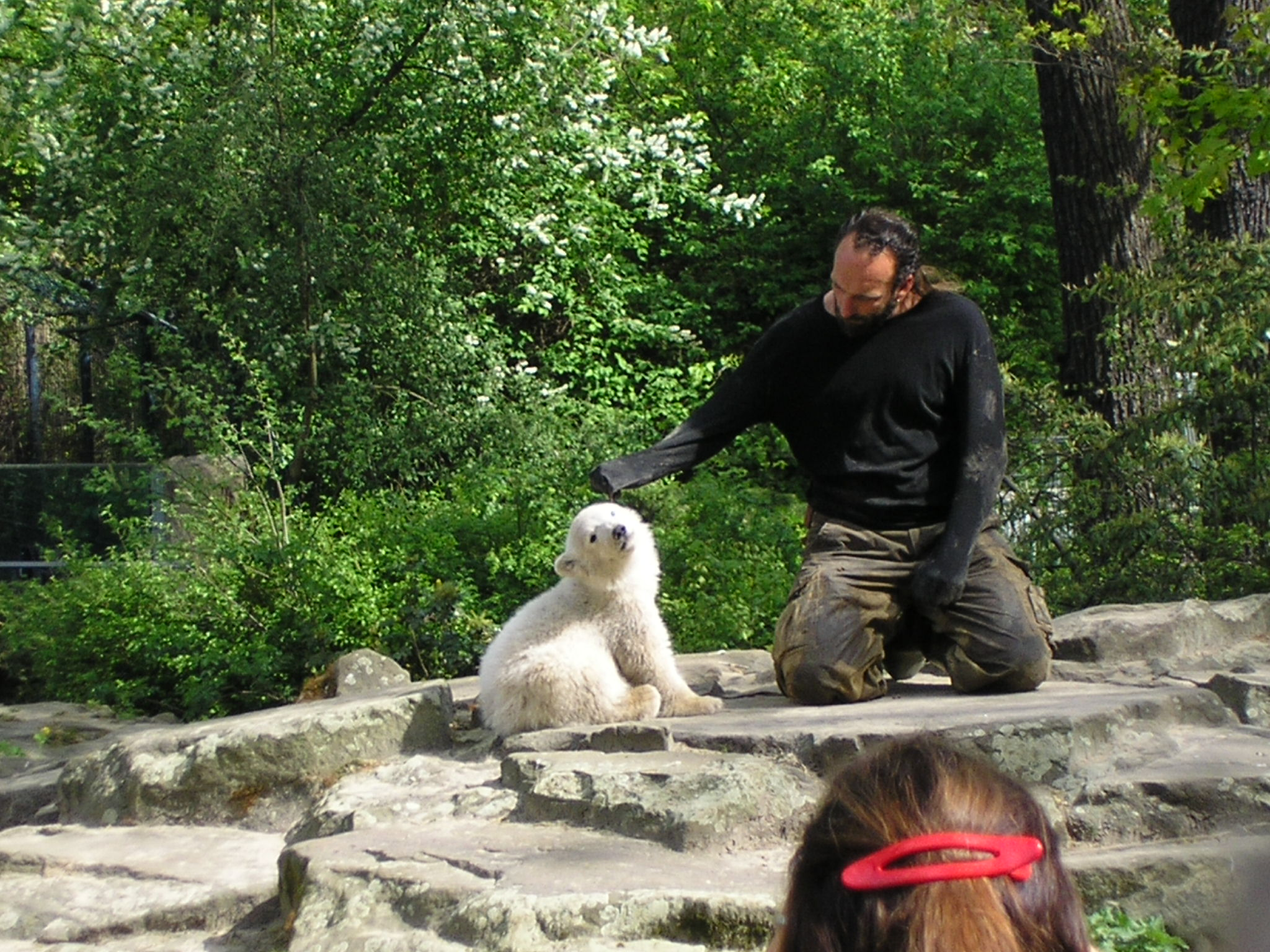
Dörflein with Knut in April 2007

Knut's need for around-the-clock care required that Dörflein sleep on a mattress next to Knut's sleeping crate at night, and play with, bathe, and feed the cub daily. Knut's diet began with a bottle of baby formula mixed with cod liver oil every two hours, before graduating at the age of four months to a milk porridge mixed with cat food and vitamins. Dörflein also accompanied Knut on his twice-daily one-hour shows for the public and therefore appeared in many videos and photographs alongside the cub. As a result, Dörflein became a minor celebrity in Germany. He received fan mail, and even marriage proposals, all of which made him uncomfortable; when asked about his sudden rise to fame, the zookeeper said, "It's very strange to me."

In October 2007, Dörflein was awarded Berlin's Medal of Merit in honor of his continuous care for the cub. Several months beforehand, Knut's and Dörflein's daily shows had been halted when it was decided that Knut had grown too large for the zookeeper to safely accompany him in the enclosure. With Knut nearing his first birthday, his zookeeper was barred from physical contact with the bear.

== Death ==
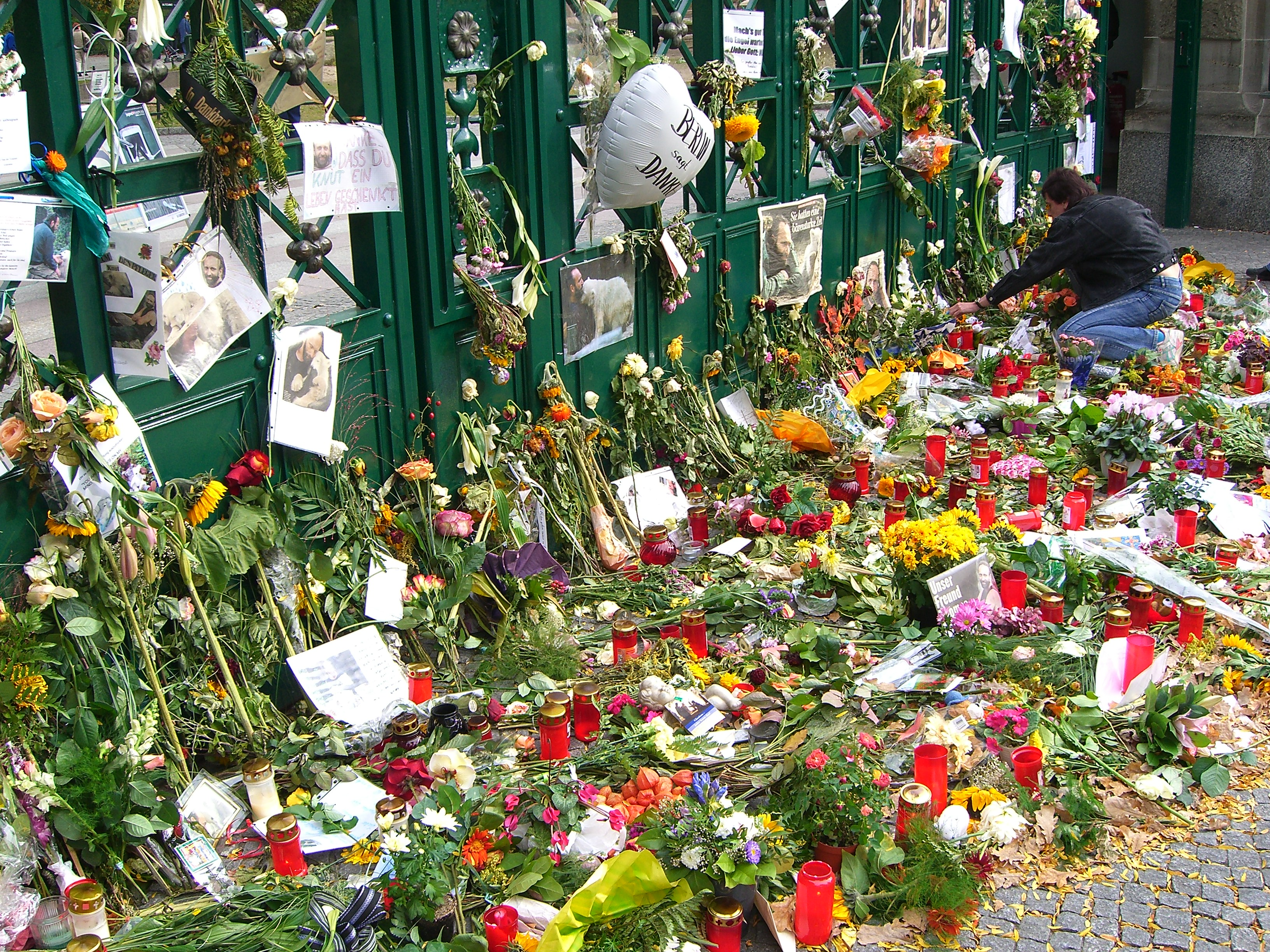
Flowers and condolences left at the entrance to the Zoo after Dörflein's death

Dörflein died suddenly in Berlin at the age of 44 of a heart attack on 22 September 2008. Dörflein had been seriously ill for some time, and had recently taken some time from work after having been diagnosed with bladder cancer; according to reports, he had gone into remission. He was survived by a stepdaughter, a son, and his girlfriend and her young son.

Berlin newspaper B.Z. wrote of Dörflein, "Everyone wanted to be like [him] ... he not only cared for Knut; he nurtured our desire to see harmony between man and beast." The Berlin Zoo, where Dörflein was employed for 26 years, released an official statement describing the death as tragic and a "great loss". The group Friends of the Berlin Zoo stated: "With the passing of Thomas Dörflein, the zoo has lost a highly dedicated zookeeper who had great passion for his job and his calling." The statement went on to note how Dörflein played a decisive role in turning Berlin "into a sensational attraction with the polar bear cub." Zoo biologist Heiner Klös added: "I am shocked by the passing of my best zookeeper, a man who gave his all for his animals."

In January 2009, Dörflein was the recipient of B.Z.'s posthumous honorary award for bringing joy to Berlin through his relationship with Knut. The zoo established a prize for outstanding zookeepers in Dörflein's honour. The first Thomas Dörflein Prize, which carries a €1,000 cash prize as well as a trophy, was awarded in June 2009. Knut succeeded him in death on 19 March 2011 after collapsing in his enclosure, at the age of four. On 5 December 2011, a memorial dedicated to Knut was unveiled near Dörflein's grave in Spandau, on what would have been the bear's fifth birthday.
