= Warrior and Peter One =

Warrior and Peter One, also known as Pone and Warrior, is a German hip hop group based out of Hannover. The duo formed their own record label on August 8, 2008, called Ehre and Stoltz.

== Early lives ==
Peter One was born Marco (April 12, 1989) in Hannover. Moving around with his family, he eventually made his way into the underground graffiti scene, earning a reputation resulting in several issues with legal authorities. Turning to music in 2004, he befriended a neighbor named Davud in 2005 who shared his artistic interests and the two formed a group.

Warrior was born Davud (April 7, 1987) in Germany, the son of an Afghanistan soldier who fought in the Soviet–Afghan War. He initially was with the group "UM," which has several members incarcerated. He is Muslim.

== Musical career ==
The duo formed their own record label on August 8, 2008, called Ehre and Stoltz, which means Honor and Pride in German, along with friend Elijah. Releasing the album of notoriety "Fifty Fifty" shortly after, notable tracks include the anti-war song "Wind of Change," which has been promoted using anti-IDF imagery, and the anti-police state song "Fuck the Police."

They have released the single "Danke Frau Merkel," a political dissent of present Chancellor Angela Merkel, as well as "Tokio Hotel diss," attacking the band "Tokio Hotel," which was highlighted in the April 23, 2008 issue of the German newspaper Bild.

In April 2009, they were highlighted in the Hannoversche Allgemeine Zeitung after an issue with legal authorities while filming a music video, having also appeared in the newspaper on March 15, 2007, highlighting their song "Welcome to Hannover City."

== Discography ==
- Faust (Regel)
- Tod Eines Popstars
- Billiges Dreckstück
- Die Stadt Gottes
- Fuck The Police
- Wenn Ich Schieß
- Das ist Hannover
- Wenn Es Aufhört Zu Regnen
- Tokio Hotel Diss
- Welcome To Hannover-City
- Deutschland ist Ghetto (tattoos by Manfred Kohrs)
