= KRASS =

German non-profit organization

KRASS e. V.
- Formation: 2008; 18 years ago
- Founder: Claudia Seidensticker
- Type: Eingetragener Verein (e. V.) / Non-profit
- Legal status: Charity
- Headquarters: Düsseldorf, Germany
- Region served: Europe (with branches in Athens, Beijing, Limburg, and Trier)
- Parent organization: Culture for Children (Foundation, est. 2010)
- Volunteers: 45
- Award: Guinness World Record (2008, "Biggest children's studio in the world")

KRASS e. V. is a German non-profit organization founded in 2008 by Claudia Seidensticker who is a visual artist, committed to the promotion of educational and arts funding for children who are from underprivileged social backgrounds.

== Overview ==
KRASS e. V. is located in Düsseldorf and has branch offices in Athens, Beijing, Limburg and Trier. About 45 staff volunteers help to initialize, organize and coordinate activities and projects for children in the cultural and artistic field for KRASS e. V. in European countries. In close cooperation all these projects were organized by artists and agencies as well as organizations offering children and youth welfare services. To consolidate this basic idea, the charity of "culture for children" was founded in 2010. It supports as pure Foundation, social initiatives such as KRASS e. V. by the allocation of sponsorship funds.

== Tasks and Aims ==
The purpose of the non-profit organization is the promotion of child welfare, primarily education and education of children from ages of 6 through 18 who are from low-income or low-education families. These children have the opportunity to earn scholarships to attend a qualified training school, for example a music, art or theatre school, to get an academic education. One of the goals of KRASS e. V. is to combat child poverty and to create a more child-friendly Europe. Concretely, KRASS e. V. organizes and finances activities which give children the possibility to recognize their skills through creativity. Furthermore, the organization seeks godparents who sponsor the education of children. KRASS e. V. is characterized by the idea of creating a child-friendly Europe. The KRASS e. V.’s activities give the children a chance to recognize their talents as well as their skills.

In the period between 2008-2010, 10 children received permanent scholarship support, 446 children have received financial support, 3704 visited the workshops organized by KRASS e. V., 6270 canvases were painted with 834 litres of colour. In total, volunteers have dedicated 43.610 hours since the organization's founding.

== History ==
KRASS e. V. was founded by Claudia Seidensticker who is a visual artist. She was forced to give up painting which she had done in the past, due to a severe car accident that left her handicapped. During her months-long stay in the hospital, she came up with the idea of offering culture and arts to children. Her wish started to become a vision: many children and assistants painting the same picture in the biggest children studio in the world. The first branch of KRASS e. V. opened with as a Social Franchising system in Trier. Under the headword "KRASS on site" steps be implemented there, the long term benefit of children scholarship. The opening of "KRASS on site" in the Trierer Kunsthaus in the old printing house on July 4, 2010 marked another milestone in the history of KRASS e. V. Düsseldorf.

Social Francising is an application of a concept which is passed on by way of contractual agreements to local independent organisations or private individuals. The project holders are independent and act on their own authority during the regional project implementation. The advantage of the open distribution is the quick and great distribution of the project concept. Moreover, the independency of the project holders makes it easier to adjust the concept to the local conditions. The rights and duties of the project manager and holders are being determined in detail. The result is a self-learning system which uses the experience of the project holders, allows the development of local creative energies and activates resources for the overall system.

== Projects ==
=== Guinness World Record: The biggest children's studio ===
The motto of the first children studio 2008 was: the joy of painting, the creative process, the participation, without “rights and wrongs”. Equipped with 1000 canvases, 800 paint brushes and 400 litre buckets of colour, hundreds of children and assistants met to create the biggest children's studio in the world located in the depot of “Rheinbahn Düsseldorf”. This event was under the patronage of Ursula von der Leyen, the minister of family in the German government. The participation in the event was free. The project “the biggest children's studio” was completed in September, 20th 2008 in Düsseldorf and was written down in the Guinness Book of Records.

=== The biggest children's studio in Africa ===
The second children's studio symbolized the solidarity as well as the get-together of people from different colours. This time, the Children's Village Kilolo in Tanzania was included so the creative bridge from Germany to Africa could be built. On October 24, 2009, the children of the children's village Kilolo as well as the children in Düsseldorf were painting at the same time.

=== European canvas project: "the children bridge" ===
The project was inspired by the EU Motto 2010: “Poverty and social exclusion”. Children from different European countries paint their own thoughts of Europe as well as their imagination of the European future on a canvas. The slogan: “Children paint their own Europe!”. The object of this project is to create a connective and collective artwork. Children from different European countries expressed their ideas on a 30 square meter canvas.

Presently, this travelling canvas tours throughout Europe and have travelled to these countries: Germany, Belgium, Estonia, France, Greece, Italy, Lithuania, Austria, Poland, Romania, Slovenia, Czech Republic and the United Kingdom. In each of these countries, children painted about 1 square meter. After finishing the painting-tour the newly created picture will be prepared for an exhibition. An opening with the paintings will be on 29 May 2012 in the European Parliament in Brussels.

== Scholarship ==
For especially talented children from culture-distant families, sponsorships are also sought to allow them to develop their creativity. A sponsorship may be promoting a talented child over a month, six months or a year.
