= 2011 in Germany =

- Decades: 1990s; 2000s; 2010s; 2020s; 2030s
- See also: Other events of 2011; History of Germany; Timeline; Years

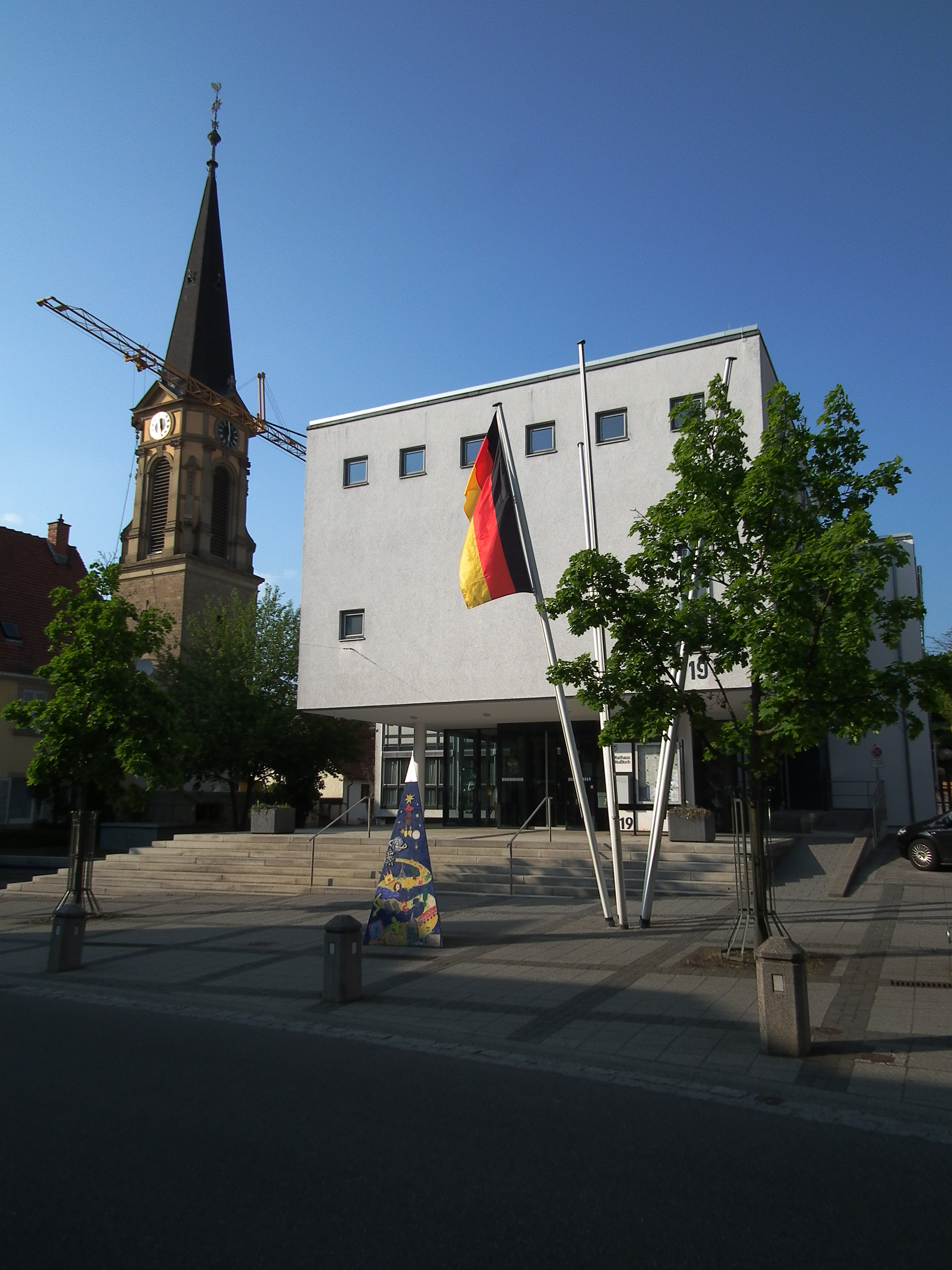
A Church and Rathaus (town hall) backdrop the German flag and construction in Nußloch, Baden-Württemberg. (2011)

The following is a list of events from the year 2011 in Germany. In 2011, Germany was recognized for having the most positive influence in the world. It was also the largest contributor to the budget of the European Union (providing 20%) and the third largest contributor to the UN (providing 8%). Germany hosted the 2011 FIFA Women's World Cup and Eurovision Song Contest and ended conscription in the Bundeswehr. In education, Germany achieved a third best result in university rankings.

== Aerospace ==
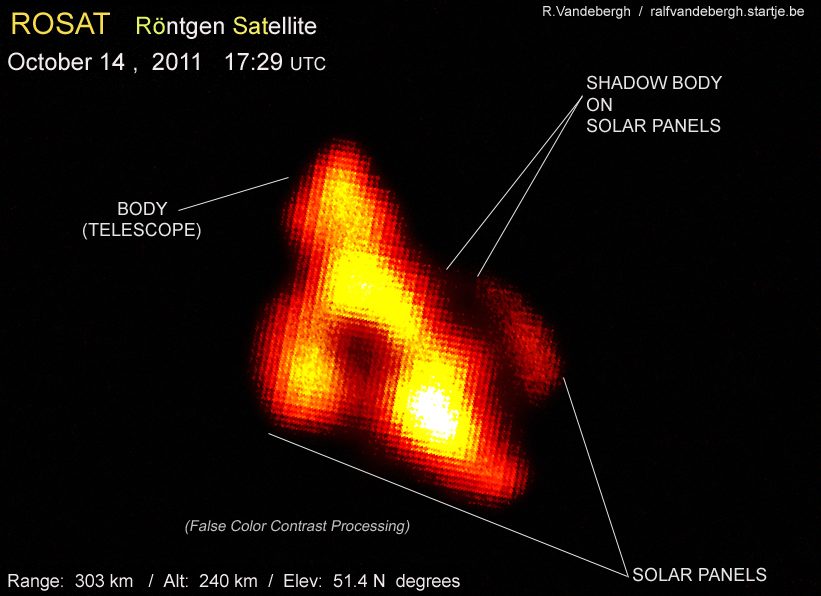
Fuzzy image of ROSAT, in its last days

A German X-ray observatory in Space called ROSAT, last active in 1999, re-entered the Earth's atmosphere on 23 October 2011. It had been launched in 1990.

The Max Planck Institute for Solar System Research and the German Aerospace Center (DLR) provided the framing cameras for the Dawn spacecraft, which arrived at asteroid 4 Vesta in mid-2011. The DLR, which is Germany's space agency took on Hansjörg Dittus as an executive Board member for space research and development in June.

Another space project Germany was involved with was the Mars Science Laboratory Radiation Assessment Detector (RAD), which was funded by the Exploration Systems Mission Directorate at NASA Headquarters and the DLR. RAD was developed by Southwest Research Institute (SwRI) and the extraterrestrial physics group at Christian-Albrechts-Universität zu Kiel, Germany. RAD was the first of ten MSL instruments to be turned on, on the route to Mars. It will characterize the broad spectrum of radiation environment found inside the spacecraft.

== Bundeswehr ==
In May 2011 the German Bundeswehr had 188,000 professional soldiers and 31,000 18‑ to 25‑year‑old conscripts who served for at least six months. The German government announced plans to reduce the number of soldiers to 170,000 professionals and up to 15,000 short-time volunteers (voluntary military service). Reservists are available to the Armed Forces and participate in defence exercises and deployments abroad, a new reserve concept of their future strength and functions was announced 2011. As of April 2011, the German military had about 6,900 troops stationed in foreign countries as part of international peacekeeping forces, including about 4,900 Bundeswehr troops in the NATO-led ISAF force in Afghanistan and Uzbekistan, 1,150 German soldiers in Kosovo, and 300 troops with UNIFIL in Lebanon.

Until 2011, military service was compulsory for men at age 18, and conscripts served six-month tours of duty; conscientious objectors could instead opt for an equal length of Zivildienst (civilian service), or a six-year commitment to (voluntary) emergency services like a fire department or the Red Cross. On 1 July 2011 conscription was officially suspended and replaced with a voluntary service.

== Churches ==
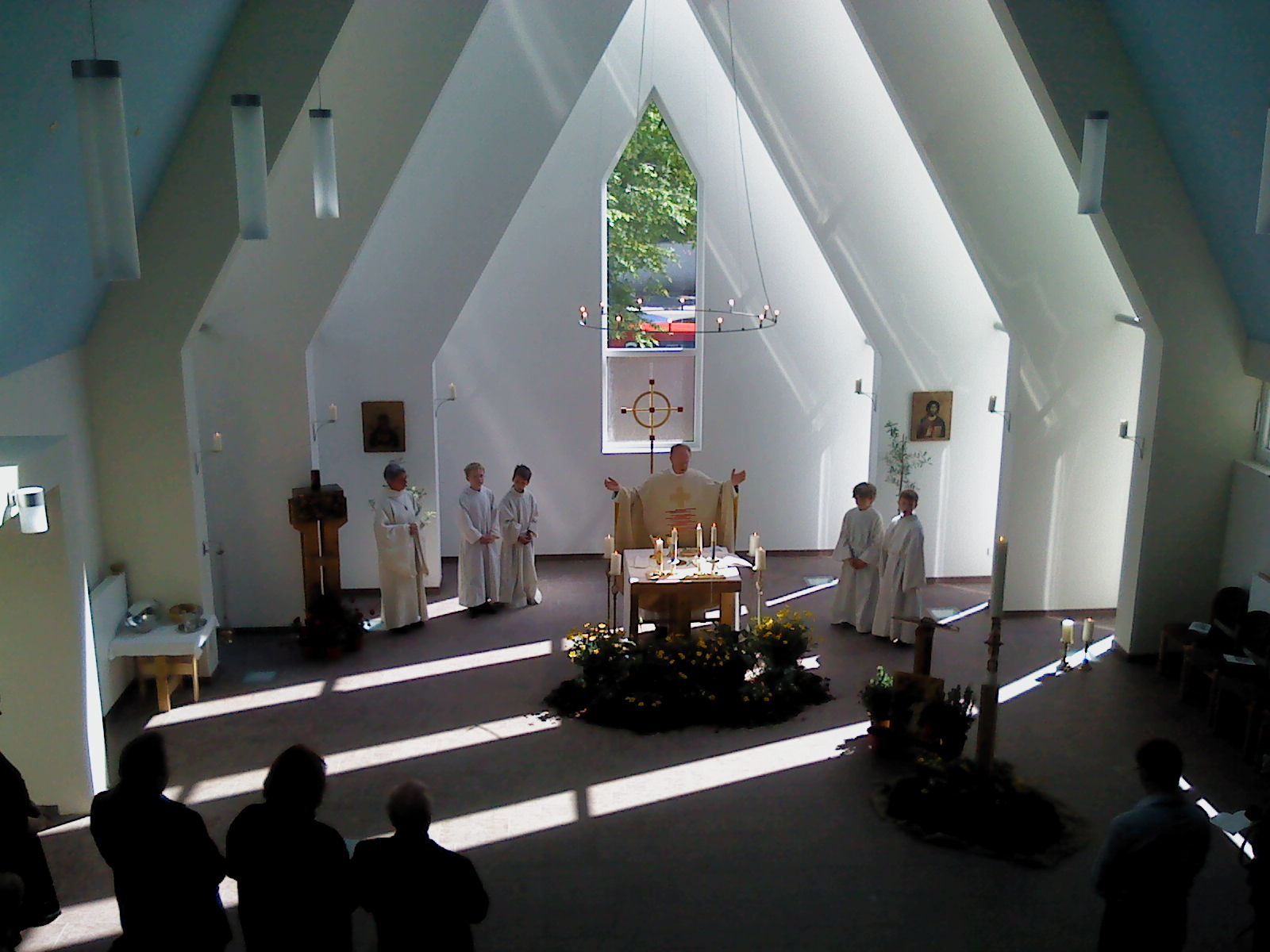
Newly constructed in 2011, Angélique Arnauld Church

The Pope, the leader of the Catholic Church, made his first official visit to Germany in 2011. In 2011, there were 25 million Catholics in Germany, which is about one third of the population.(BBC, 2011) Pope Benedict XVI was welcomed by the Chancellor and the President of Germany, and then made visits across the country, such as with leaders of the Lutheran Church.

== Chancellor ==
The Chancellor of Germany was named the fourth most powerful person in the world by Forbes in 2011. A poll in August 2011 found the Chancellor's coalition with 36% support.

== Elections ==
There were a number of elections in Germany in 2011 including:

- Baden-Württemberg state election, 2011
- Berlin state election, 2011
- Bremen state election, 2011
- Hamburg state election, 2011
- Mecklenburg-Vorpommern state election, 2011
- Rhineland-Palatinate state election, 2011
- Saxony-Anhalt state election, 2011

== Sporting events ==
Some examples of sporting events hosted in Germany.

- 2011 German Masters
- 2011 FIFA Women's World Cup
- 2011 German Figure Skating Championships

== Renewable energy ==
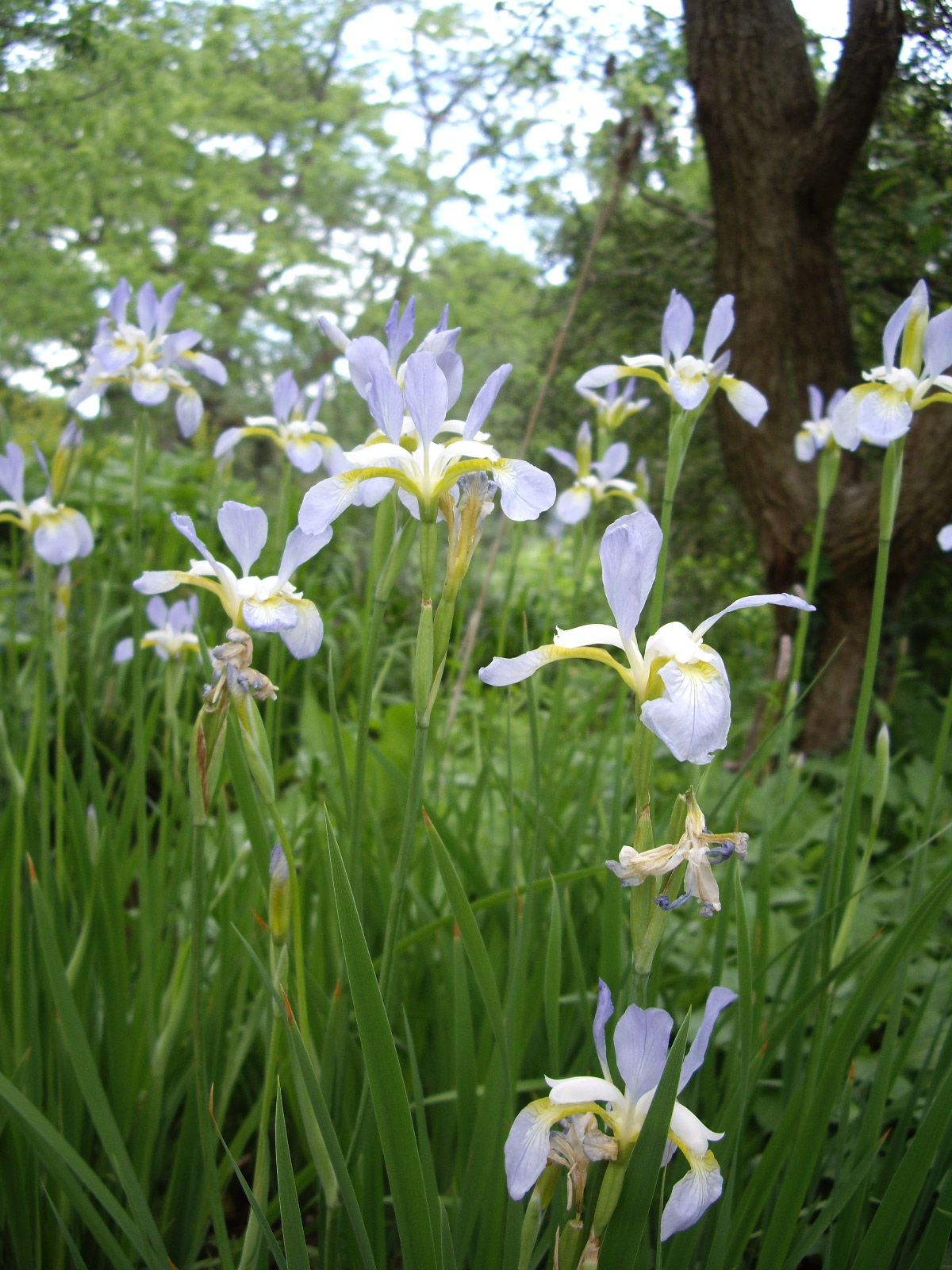
Flowers bloom in spring at Schlosspark Herrenhausen, Hannover, Germany. (2011)

By January 2011, around 17% of electricity, 8% of heat and 6% of fuel used in Germany was generated from renewable sources, reducing Germany's energy imports (DENA, 2011). By early 2011, the renewable energy industry employed more than 350,000 people in Germany, up from 30,000 people in 1998. Germany hosted businesses like Enercon, Nordex and REpower Systems in the wind industry and Q-Cells, Schott Solar and SolarWorld in the solar industry. Germany was one of the world's three major renewable energy economies (Renewable Energy Network 21, 2011).

In 2011, Germany's federal government worked on a plan for increasing renewable energy commercialization, with a particular focus on offshore wind farms. Among many ongoing developments in wind power, the Baltic 1 wind farm was commissioned on 2 May 2011.

Eight nuclear power reactors in Germany were declared shutdown on 6 August 2011: Biblis A and B, Brunsbuettel, Isar 1, Kruemmel, Neckarwestheim 1, Philippsburg 1 and Unterweser.

== Incumbents ==
=== Federal level ===
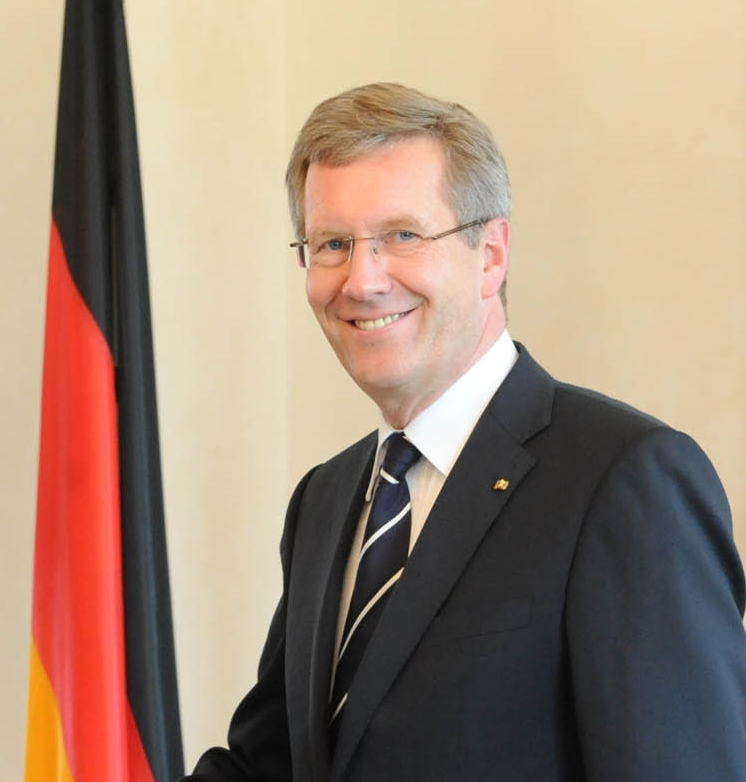
Christian Wulff

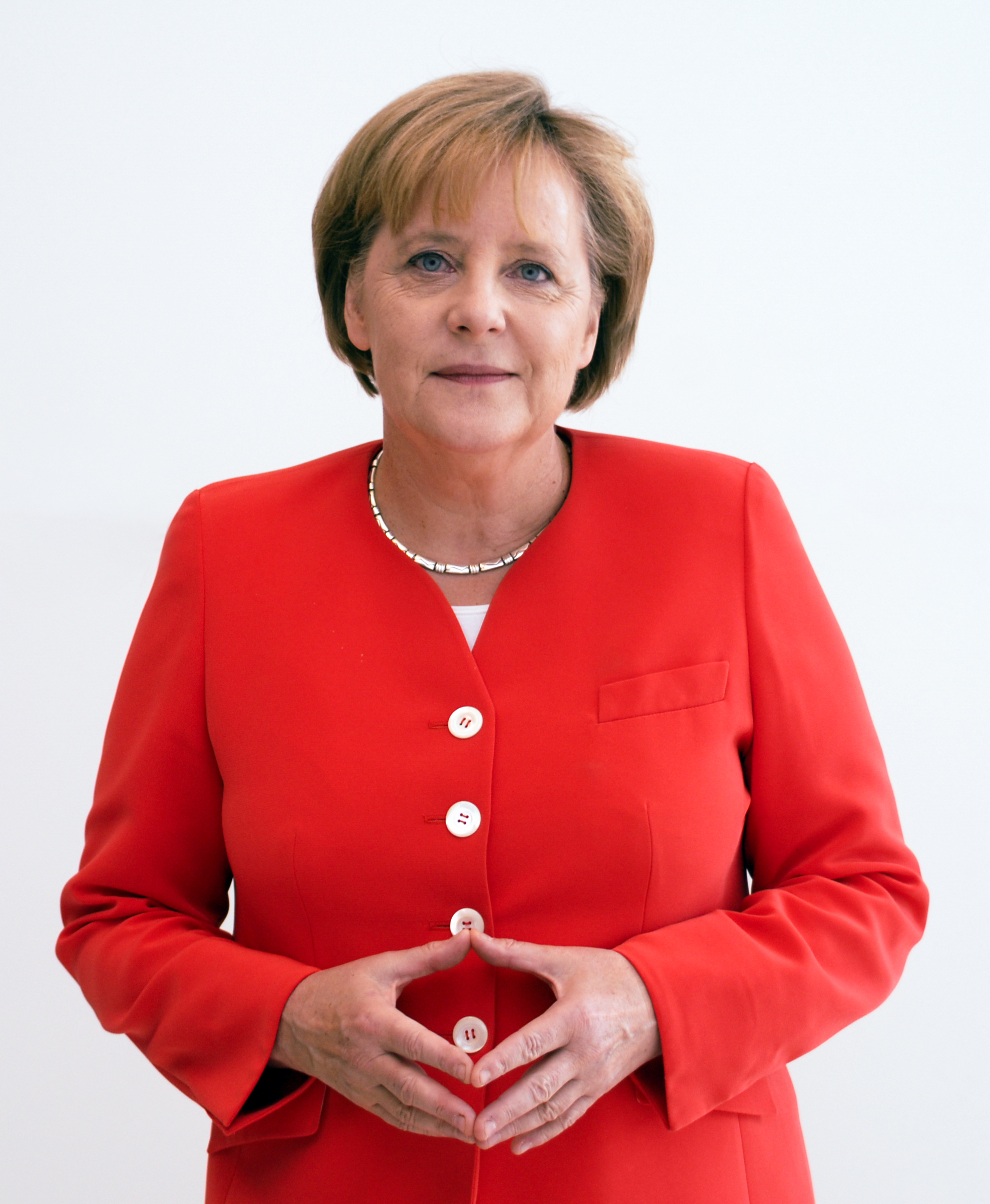
Angela Merkel

- President – Christian Wulff
- Chancellor – Angela Merkel

=== State level ===
- Minister-President of Baden-Wuerttemberg – Stefan Mappus (until 12 May), Winfried Kretschmann
- Minister-President of Bavaria – Horst Seehofer
- Mayor of Berlin – Klaus Wowereit
- Minister-President of Brandenburg – Matthias Platzeck
- Mayor of Bremen – Jens Boehrnsen
- Mayor of Hamburg – Christoph Ahlhaus (until 7 March), Olaf Scholz
- Minister-President of Hesse – Volker Bouffier
- Minister-President of Mecklenburg-Vorpommern – Erwin Sellering
- Minister-President of Niedersachsen – David McAllister
- Minister-President of North Rhine-Westphalia – Hannelore Kraft
- Minister-President of Rhineland-Palatinate – Kurt Beck
- Minister-President of Saarland – Peter Mueller (until 10 August), Annegret Kramp-Karrenbauer
- Minister-President of Saxony – Stanislaw Tillich
- Minister-President of Saxony-Anhalt – Wolfgang Boehmer (until 19 April), Reiner Haseloff
- Minister-President of Schleswig-Holstein – Peter Harry Carstensen
- Minister-President of Thuringia – Christine Lieberknecht

== Events ==
- 1 January - The German People's Union (DVU) merges with the National Democratic Party of Germany (NPD).
- 7 January
  - A major food scandal erupts.
  - Due to thawing weather conditions, several rivers burst their banks.
- 20 February – Hamburg state election, 2011. German party SPD wins a majority.
- 1 March – Karl-Theodor zu Guttenberg resigns as German defence minister.
- 2 March – Two U.S. soldiers are killed and two wounded in the 2011 Frankfurt Airport shooting.

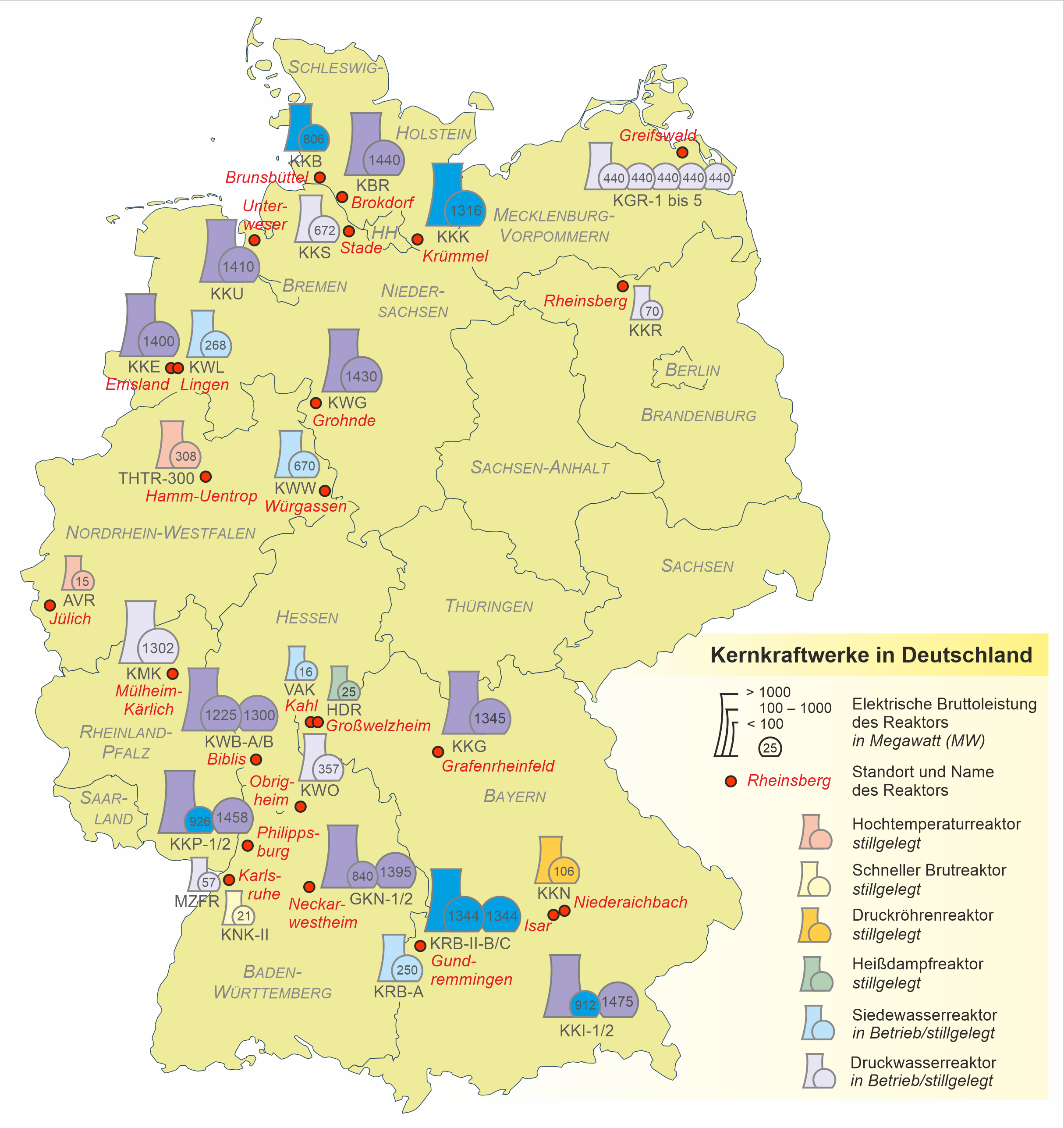
Nuclear power plants in Germany (Date: 2010)

- 15 March – German chancellor Angela Merkel shuts down the seven oldest German nuclear power plants.
- 20 March – Saxony-Anhalt state election, 2011
- 24 March – Krailling double homicide in Krailing, Bavaria.
- 27 March – Baden-Württemberg state election, 2011 and Rhineland-Palatinate state election, 2011
- 3 April – Guido Westerwelle announced his resignation as party leader of German liberal Free Democratic Party after ten years in these position.
- 12 May
  - Rainer Brüderle lost his Federal Ministry of Economics and Technology to politician Philipp Rösler. Daniel Bahr becomes next German Federal Minister of Health.
  - Winfried Kretschmann becomes Minister-President of Baden-Wuerttemberg. As the first Green Party Minister-President in Germany, he leads a Green/SPD coalition.
- 14 May – Eurovision Song Contest in Düsseldorf
- 22 May – Bremen state election, 2011 in Bremen
- 30 May – German government announces plans to abandon nuclear power entirely by 2022.
- 31 May – Journalist and weather presenter Jörg Kachelmann is acquitted of rape after being falsely accused of the crime by his ex-girlfriend Claudia Dinkel. Kachelmann had been imprisoned for over four months while under investigation and suffered significant damage to his career as a result of the false rape accusations.
- May – 2011 E. coli O104:H4 outbreak in northern Germany
- 26 June – 17 July – 2011 FIFA Women's World Cup, won by Japan.
- 30 June – Tennis: Germany's Sabine Lisicki is knocked out in the semi-finals of the women's singles at Wimbledon, having made it further in the tournament than previously expected.
- 1 July – Conscription ends in Germany.
- 7 July – German Bundestag allows Preimplantation genetic diagnosis
- 24 July – The 2011 German Grand Prix is held at the Nürburgring in Nürburg.
- 2 September – Germany secures qualification for Euro 2012, with a 6–2 win over Austria.
- 4 September – Mecklenburg-Vorpommern state election, 2011
- 7 September – The Federal Constitutional Court of Germany rules that Germany can continue to contribute to Eurozone bailouts.
- 18 September – Berlin state election, 2011 – Klaus Wowereit of the SPD is re-elected as Mayor. The FDP is voted out of the Berlin parliament, while the Pirate Party is voted in.
- 11 October – Germany keeps its 100% record in Euro 2012 qualifying, defeating Belgium 3–1.
- 4 November – Bosphorus serial murders: Far-right extremists Uwe Mundlos and Uwe Boehnhardt die in a fire in Zwickau while Beate Zschaepe hands herself in to the police. Together, they are found to be responsible for a series of racially motivated murders and the murder of policewoman Michele Kiesewetter in Heilbronn in 2007.
- 8 November – The Nord Stream 1 pipeline is officially inaugurated by the German Chancellor Angela Merkel, Russian President Dmitry Medvedev and French Prime Minister François Fillon at the ceremony held in Lubmin.
- 2 December – For Euro 2012, Germany is drawn into a group with the Netherlands, Denmark and Portugal.
- 5 December – An International Conference on Afghanistan is held in Bonn.
- 23 December – Christian Wulff and Angela Merkel attend the funeral of Václav Havel in Prague.

== Deaths ==
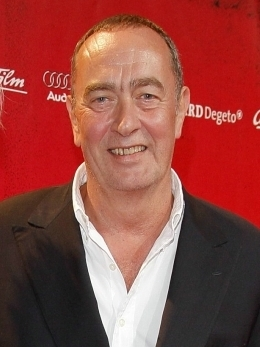
Bernd Eichinger

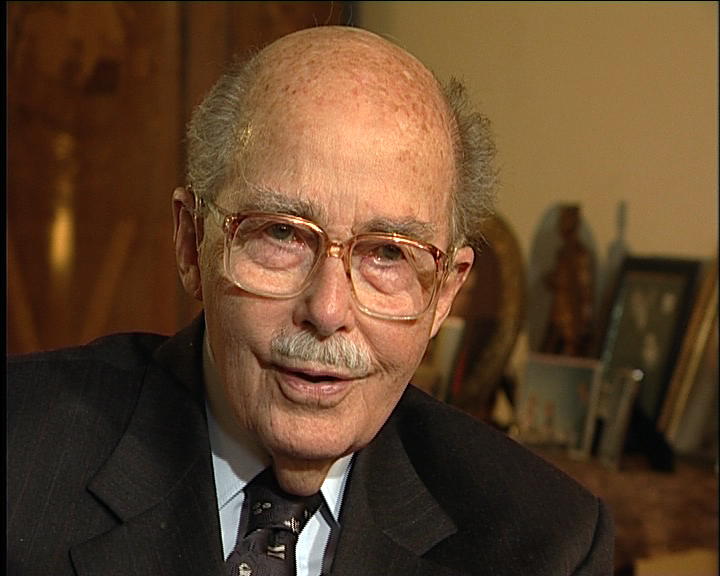
Otto von Habsburg

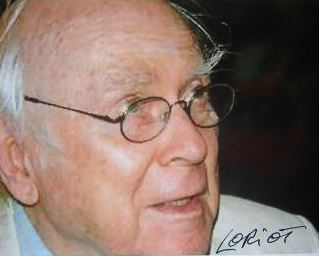
Loriot

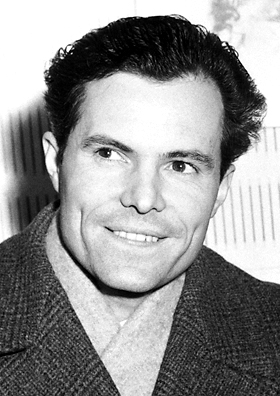
Rudolf Mössbauer

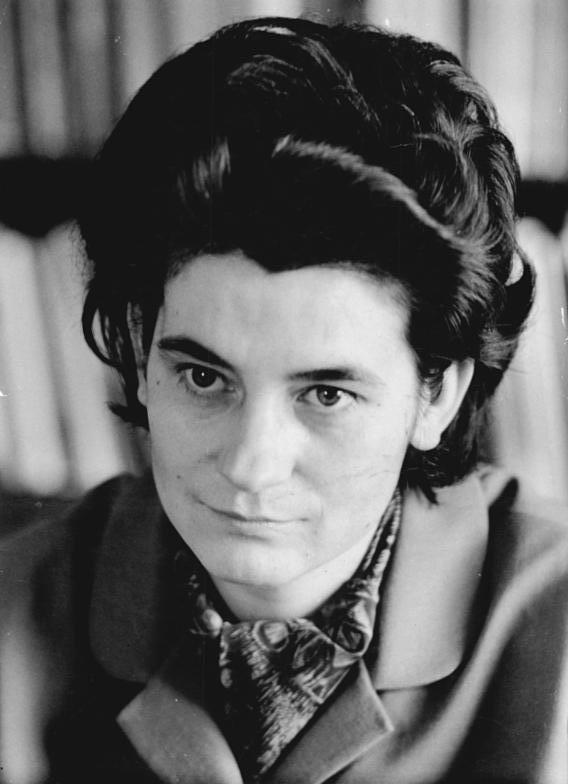
Christa Wolf

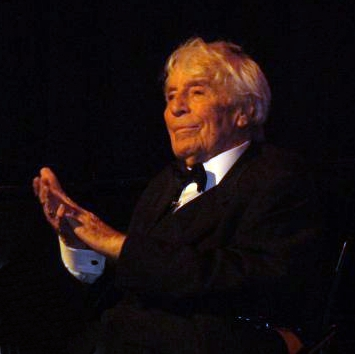
Johannes Heesters

=== January ===
- 1 January – Gerd Michael Henneberg, 88, actor (b. 1922)
- 3 January – Eva Strittmatter, 80, author (b. 1930)
- 6 January – Gad Granach, 95, memoirist (b. 1915)
- 13 January
  - Hellmut Lange, 87, actor (b. 1923)
  - Egon Drews, 84, canoeist (b. 1926)
- 24 January – Bernd Eichinger, 61, film producer and director (b. 1949)

=== February ===
- 10 February – Claus Helmut Drese, 88, theatre and opera administrator (b. 1922)
- 11 February – Josef Pirrung, 61, footballer (b. 1949)
- 12 February – Adolf Spies von Büllesheim, 81, politician (b. 1929)
- 16 February – Hans Joachim Alpers, 67, writer and editor (b. 1943)
- 19 February – Dietrich Stobbe, 72, politician, former Mayor of Berlin (b. 1938)
- 20 February – Helmut Ringelmann, 84, film and television producer (b. 1926)
- 23 February – Gustav Just, 89, journalist and politician (b. 1921)

=== March ===
- 19 March – Knut, 4, polar bear (b. 2006)

=== April ===
- 3 April – Ulli Beier, 89, editor, writer and scholar (b. 1922)
- 4 April – Witta Pohl, 73, actress (b. 1937)
- 6 April – Hans Tiedge, 73, spy (b. 1937)

=== May ===
- 7 May – Gunter Sachs, 78, German-Swiss photographer and art collector (b. 1932)
- 8 May – Hans-Georg Borck, 89, military officer (b. 1921)
- 30 May – Tillmann Uhrmacher, 44, DJ, musician and radio host (b. 1967)
- 31 May – Hans Keilson, 101, German-Dutch author, doctor and psychoanalyst (b. 1909)

=== June ===
- 4 June – Curth Flatow, 91, screenwriter and dramatist (b. 1920)
- 14 June – Peter Schamoni, 77, director and producer (b. 1934)
- 18 June – Ulrich Biesinger, 77, footballer (b. 1933)
- 30 June – Georg Sterzinsky, 75, cardinal (b. 1936)

=== July ===
- 4 July
  - Otto von Habsburg, 98, Austro-Hungarian nobleman and politician, died in Bavaria (b. 1912)
  - Gerhard Unger, 94, opera singer (b. 1916)
- 13 July – Heinz Reincke, 86, actor (b. 1925)
- 14 July – Leo Kirch, 84, media entrepreneur (b. 1926)
- 17 July – Aba Dunner, 73, German-born Jewish activist (b. 1937)
- 20 July – Lucian Freud, 88, German-born British painter (b. 1922)
- 28 July – Bernd Clüver, 63, Schlager singer (b. 1948)

=== August ===
- 3 August – Rudolf Brazda, 98, concentration camp prisoner (b. 1913)
- 4 August – Conrad Schnitzler, 74, musician (b. 1937)
- 14 August – Friedrich Schoenfelder, 94, actor (b. 1916)
- 22 August – Vicco von Bülow (Loriot), 87, humorist, cartoonist, film director, actor and writer (b. 1923)
- 31 August – Rosel Zech, 71, actress (b. 1940)

=== September ===
- 6 September – Hans Apel, 79, politician (b. 1932)
- 7 September – Robert Dietrich, 25, ice hockey player (b. 1986)
- 14 September – Rudolf Mössbauer, 82, Nobel Prize-winning physicist (b. 1929)
- 17 September – Kurt Sanderling, 98, conductor (b. 1912)
- 28 September – Heidi, 3, opossum (b. 2008)

=== October ===
- 2 October – Peter Przygodda, 69, film director (b. 1941)
- 12 October – Heinz Bennent, 90, actor (b. 1921)
- 17 October – Manfred Gerlach, 83, politician (b. 1928)
- 18 October – Friedrich Kittler, 68, literary scholar and media theorist (b. 1943)
- 28 October – Jiri Grusa, 72, Czech diplomat and author, died in Hanover (b. 1938)
- 29 October – Walter Norris, 79, American musician and pianist, died in Berlin (b. 1931)
- 30 October – Mickey Scott, 64, German-born American baseball player (b. 1947)

=== November ===
- 3 November – H. G. Francis (Hans Gerhard Franciskowsky), 75, author of popular fiction (b. 1936)
- 12 November – Eva Monley, 88, German-born Kenyan film location scout (b. 1923)
- 14 November – Franz Josef Degenhardt, 79, singer, poet, novelist and satirist (b. 1931)
- 22 November
  - Kristian Schultze, 66, musician (b. 1945)
  - Hans Reichel, 62, guitarist (b. 1949)

=== December ===
- 1 December – Christa Wolf, 82, writer and poet (b. 1929)
- 3 December – Heinrich Sonne, 94, Waffen-SS member (b. 1917)
- 6 December – Barbara Orbison, 61, German-born American record producer and widow of Roy Orbison (b. 1950)
- 11 December – Hans Heinz Holz, 84, Marxist philosopher (b. 1927)
- 13 December – Klaus-Dieter Sieloff, 69, footballer (b. 1942)
- 15 December – Walter Giller, 84, actor (b. 1927)
- 21 December – Werner Otto, 102, businessman and entrepreneur (b. 1909)
- 24 December
  - Johannes Heesters, 108, actor and singer (b. 1903)
  - Walter Söhne, 98, agronomist (b. 1913)
- 25 December – Hans-Heinrich Isenbart, 88, sports commentator (b. 1923)

== See also ==
- History of Germany
