= Dunner =

Dunner is a surname. Notable people with the surname include:

- Aba Dunner (1937–2011), British Jewish social activist
- David L. Dunner (born 1940), American psychiatrist
- Josef Hirsch Dunner (1913–2007), German-born English orthodox rabbi
- Joseph Hirsch Dünner (1833–1911), Austrian-born Dutch orthodox rabbi
- Leslie Dunner (born 1956), American conductor and composer
- Pini Dunner (born 1970), British-born American orthodox rabbi
- Lukas Dunner (born 12 February 2002), Austrian racing driver

== See also ==
- Dunn (surname)
- Duner
