= Michael Paetau =

German sociologist (born 1947)

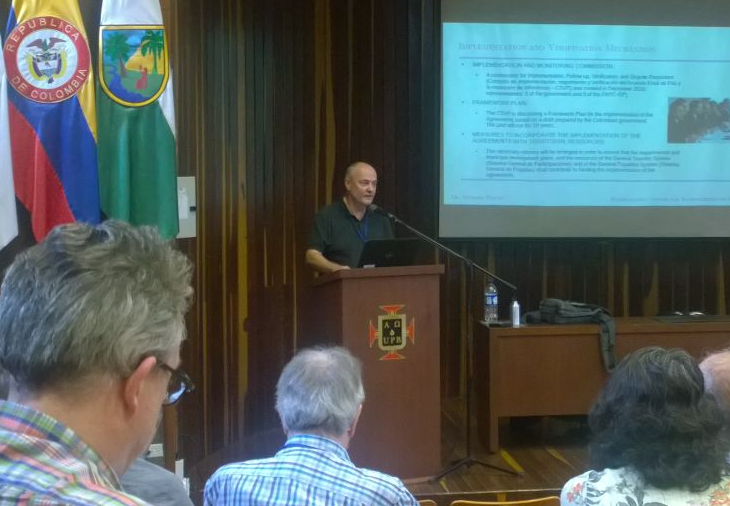
Michael Paetau's Lecture at the 14. International Conference of Sociocybernetics, Medellin, Colombia, June 20–23, 2017

Michael Paetau, born 15. August 1947, is a German Sociologist and currently head of the Centre for Studies of Knowledge Cultures, located in Bonn, Germany, and Bogotá, Colombia. From 2006 to 2014 he was a board member of the Research Committee on Sociocybernetics (RC51) of the International Sociological Association (ISA), and editor of the Journal of Sociocybernetics from 2010 to 2014. With his Colombian wife, Constanza Ruiz, he lives in Bonn and Bogotá and have two adult children. Michael Paetau is also the author of the Blogg "Colombian Diary" (in German: Kolumbianisches Tagebuch)., where he is continuously publishing his observations of the Colombian Society.

== Scientific education and career ==
After an education as an insurance professional and a one-year activity as a banker in Switzerland he studied sociology, philosophy, economics and history in Hamburg and Marburg, Germany. He graduated in Marburg with a monetary theory thesis on Karl Marx. His doctor degree in social and economic science (Dr. rer.pol.) he received 1989 for his work of "Human-Machine-Communication" at the University of Bremen.

In Marburg, in the mid-1970s for the first time he was confronted by his former professor of philosophy, Hans Heinz Holz, with the discourse on cybernetics, at this time a new and upcoming scientific discipline, which claimed to overcome the fundamental theoretical and methodical dualism of natural sciences and the humanities. However many years later he revisited this thread, when he was appointed as a member of the recently established Technology Assessment Group of the German National Research Center for Information Technology (GMD) in Sankt Augustin, near Bonn.

From 1995 - 1998 he was head of the research team Culture - Media - Technology of the "Institute for Applied Information Technology", of the German National Research Center for Information Technology (GMD). 1998–2002 he was head of the research team Social Systems of the GMD-Institute for Autonomous Intelligent Systems, and 1999 - 2002 Speaker of the research department Informed Sustainability. 2004–2005 he was Professor for Media and Communication Science at the University of Siegen, Faculty for Literatures, Languages and Media and 2002–2004 Professor for Communication Studies at the University of Duisburg-Essen, Campus Essen, Faculty for Literatures and Languages. From 2005 to 2008 he was responsible for strategy development at the Fraunhofer Institute for Intelligent Analysis and Information Systems. (IAIS). From 2009 to 2019, he was Director of the International Center for Sociocybernetics. Since 2019, he has headed the Centre for Studies of Knowledge Cultures in Bonn.

== Political activities ==
As a young student Michael Paetau was one of the founding members of the Marxist Students Association in Germany. In the 1980s he was engaged in the activities for a fundamental democratic and pluralistic renewal and updating of a socialist societal perspective. These ideas were strongly influenced by the discourse on Second Order Cybernetics and the consequences for a political transformation. After being unsuccessful with these new ideas he withdrew at the end of the 1980s from politics.

But 2009, nearly twenty years later, he committed himself again in political activities. He jointed the new German Pirate Party which was founded two years ago. And again he tried to connect the basic ideas of Second Order Cybernetics with fundamental visions of a new and radical political participation. This in the meantime had been given a name: Liquid Democracy. For the election for the state parliament of North Rhine-Westphalia 2012 Michael Paetau was one of two candidates of the constituency Bonn. With the election of 20 delegates it was so far the greatest success of the German Pirate Party.
