= Thane Rosenbaum =

American novelist

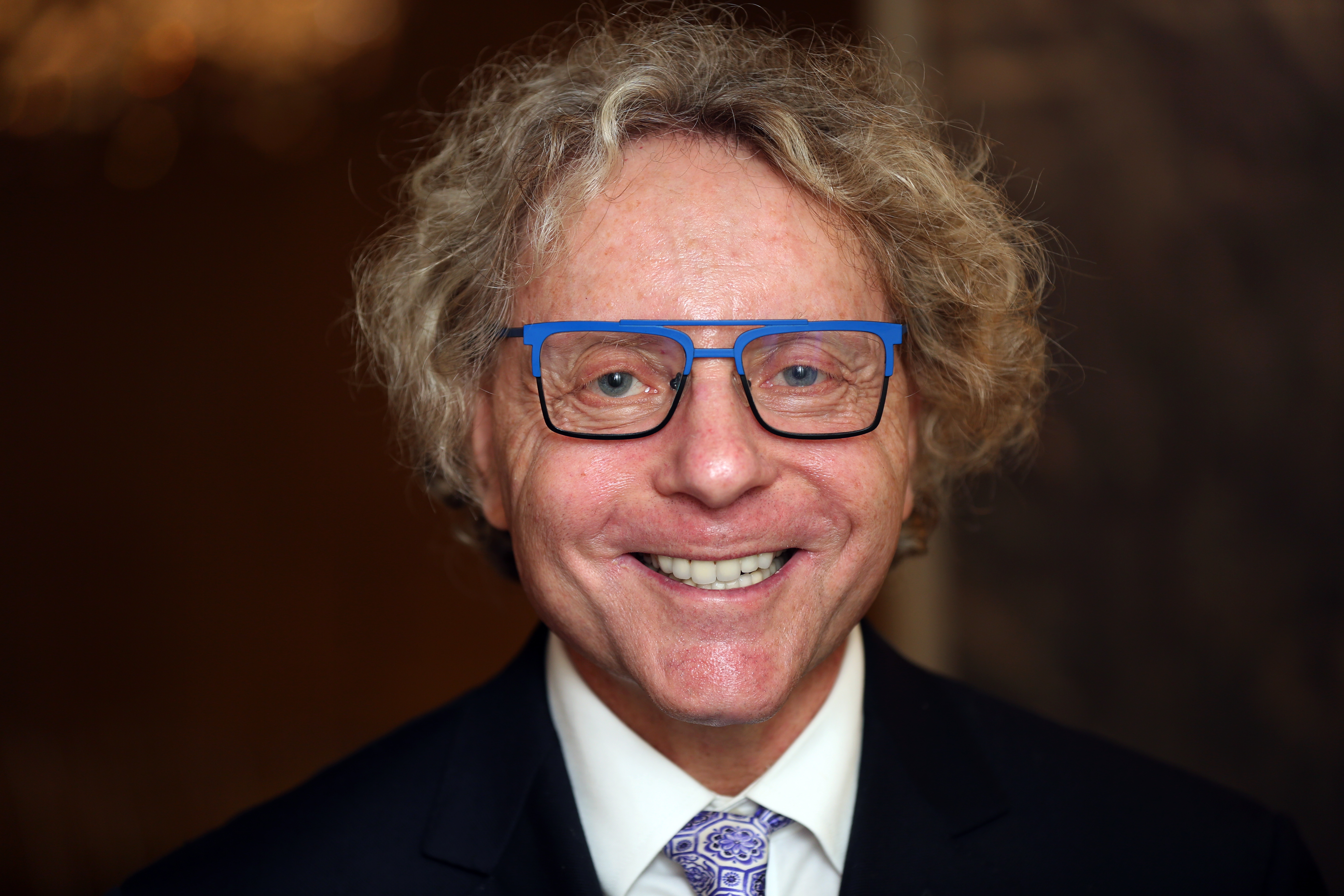
- Born: 1960 (age 65–66); New York City, U.S.
- Education: University of Florida (BA); Columbia University (MPA); University of Miami (JD)
- Occupations: Novelist; essayist; law professor; director of the Forum on Life, Culture & Society

Thane Rosenbaum (born 1960) is an American novelist and essayist. He is the director of the Forum on Life, Culture, & Society, hosted by Touro College. Rosenbaum is also the Legal Analyst for CBS News Radio and appears frequently on cable television news programs.

== Early life ==
Rosenbaum was born in New York City, in Washington Heights, and grew up in Miami Beach, Florida, where his parents moved when he was nine years old. He is a child of Holocaust survivors. His mother had been in Majdanek concentration camp, his father in various concentration camps, including Auschwitz concentration camp. Their experiences in the Nazi death camps were not discussed within the household, but the subject has shaped Rosenbaum's career and writing.

== Education ==
Rosenbaum graduated in 1981, from the University of Florida where he was class valedictorian and the Florida nominee for the Rhodes and Marshall Scholarships. In 1983, he earned an MPA from Columbia University's School of Public Policy and Administration. In 1986 he earned his J.D. from the University of Miami School of Law, where he was a Harvey T. Reid Scholar and served as editor-in-chief of the University of Miami Law Review.

== Professional background and activities ==
Immediately after law school, he clerked for the Eugene P. Spellman, United States district judge of the United States District Court for the Southern District of Florida. He then was an associate in the litigation department at Debevoise & Plimpton, where he also coordinated the firm's pro bono cases.

Rosenbaum taught at Fordham Law School from 1992 to 2014, teaching human rights, legal humanities, and law and literature. In Spring 2005, he was a visiting professor at the Benjamin N. Cardozo School of Law at Yeshiva University, where he has been a frequent speaker, including at the annual Yom HaShoah Lecture hosted jointly by the American Society for Yad Vashem and Cardozo's Program in Holocaust & Human Rights Studies on “Remember How the Law Went Horribly Wrong”; the 60th anniversary of the Nuremberg Trials on "A Reappraisal and Their Legacy"; and as the Uri & Caroline Bauer Distinguished Lecturer on Rosenbaum's book, “The Myth of Moral Justice."

As a cultural commentator, Rosenbaum has been invited to speak at universities and other venues around the world, including the Yale University International Human Rights Symposium, Princeton University, the UCLA Center for Jewish Studies, the Goethe-Institut in New York, and the United States Holocaust Memorial Museum in Washington, D.C. He has served as an advisor, writer, co-producer, and commentator on several documentary films, including “Imaginary Witness: Hollywood and the Holocaust," produced and directed by Daniel Anker, “Forgiveness,” directed by Helen Whitney for PBS, and “Sidney Lumet, A Moral Lens,” a PBS American Masters film.

Under Rosenbaum's leadership, the Forum on Life, Culture, & Society (FOLCS), Rosenbaum has hosted a wide range of notable guests, including Bill Clinton, Elie Wiesel, and Mario Cuomo.

Rosenbaum moderates "The Talk Show With Thane Rosenbaum" at 92Y, where he has interviewed authors, musicians, directors, screenwriters, poets, politicians, and other public figures, including Jeb Bush, Ambassador Michael Oren, Eric Cantor, Debbie Wasserman Schultz, and Lawrence Summers. The 92nd Street Y hosts "The Talk Show with Thane Rosenbaum," an annual series of discussions on arts, culture, and politics. As the moderator of the Trials & Error series at 92Y, his panelists revisit high-profile court cases for a behind-the-scenes look at the legal strategies and foibles with lawyers, journalists, and the parties to the action or their family members and close associates.

== Controversies ==
In 2014, Rosenbaum was criticized by some commentators for an article in the Wall Street Journal where critics believe that he justified Israel's killing of Palestinian children whose parents are loyal to Hamas.

In January 2019, Martin Lewis and his family left Saatchi Shul in London over Rosenbaum's 'polemical' Shabbat speech.

On July 29, 2025, Rosenbaum published Beyond Proportionality: Israel's Just War in Gaza, which argues for a recalibration of the principle of proportionality. Rosenbaum contends that the destruction in Gaza is a lawful consequence of "military necessity" and does not constitute a violation of international humanitarian law (IHL). The book's thesis has been the subject of significant controversy, as several international legal and human rights bodies have reached conclusions that contradict Rosenbaum's arguments. By late 2024, the International Criminal Court (ICC) had issued arrest warrants for Israeli leadership, citing evidence of war crimes and crimes against humanity. By late 2025, Palestinian fatalities were reported to have exceeded 69,000, with over 100,000 wounded; a March 2026 report from the OHCHR noted that approximately 70% of verified fatalities were women and children.

== Bibliography ==
=== Non-fiction ===
- Beyond Proportionality: Israel's Just War in Gaza (2025)
- Saving Free Speech...from Itself (2020)
- Payback: The Case for Revenge (2013)
- The Myth of Moral Justice: Why Our Legal System Fails to Do What's Right (2004)

=== Fiction ===
- How Sweet It Is! (2015)
- The Stranger Within Sarah Stein (2012)
- The Golems of Gotham: A Novel (2002)
- Second Hand Smoke: A Novel (2000)
- Elijah Visible: Stories (1996)
- Anthology: "Law Lit, From Atticus Finch to the Practice: A Collection of Great Writing About the Law," Editor, (The New Press 2007)
