= Yechezkel Taub (Yablon) =

Hasidic rabbi and founder of Kfar Hasidim

Yechezkel Taub or George Ezekiel Taub Nagel (7 October 1895 – 22 May 1986) was the Yabloner Rebbe (now Jabłonna, Poland).

Taub was a rebbe, a Hasidic leader, involved the migration from Europe to Mandatory Palestine in the interwar years, and the founder of Kfar Hasidim. He was a namesake and descendant of the first Yechezkel Taub, the Kuzmirer Rebbe.

He lost his faith after the Holocaust, moved to the United States and changed his name to 'George Nagel', becoming a secular Los Angelan laborer and businessman with his past identity hidden. He later went bankrupt and began his college education at an advanced age. Eventually, he returned to Judaism, moved to Israel, and resumed a minor role as rebbe for the last few years of his life.

== Origins ==
In the 18th century, Yechezkel Taub, great-great-grandfather of the subject of this article, founded a Hasidic court in Kuzmir (the Yiddish name for Kazimierz Dolny). His descendants formed many branch sects, including the musical Modzitzer group, whose Rebbes are also named Taub.

The first Yechezkel Taub's son, Dovid Tzvi Hirsch Taub, moved to Neishtot (Nowe Miasto) to start his own Kuzmir branch. In turn, his son Yosef Moshe Taub moved to Jablonna and founded the Yabloner dynasty. Yosef Moshe was succeeded by his son Yaakov in Jablonna.

Yaakov Taub married Beila Gurman in 1882. They had four daughters, followed by Yechezkel, their only son. Yechezkel was born in his great-grandfather's seat in Neishtot.

Yechezkel Taub married his wife Pearl in 1915. Yaakov Taub died in 1920, leaving the Yabloner Chasidus in the hands of 24-year-old Yechezkel, who led it successfully.

== Palestine ==
In 1924, Taub became involved with the Lovers of Zion under the influence of Yeshaya Shapira, founder of Hapoel HaMizrachi, the Religious Zionist movement. Shapira convinced Taub that an entire hoyf (Hasidic sect) could be moved to Palestine and provide a base for Hasidic growth there and support immigration.

Taub planned to move everyone in stages, raising money for himself and an initial group of 90 families (some sources indicate a few hundred families) to emigrate, purchase land, and establish an agricultural enclave. He joined forces with Israel Hoffstein, who was leading a similar emigration. With help from the Jewish National Fund, they purchased land in the Jezreel Valley using about 25% of the funds they had collected in Europe as a down payment for their new dairy. This constituted the founding of Kfar Hasidim.

However, they encountered many problems over the next few years:

- The Hasidic settlers had no experience in the field;
- Many people were elderly or breastfeeding and unable to work;
- Although Arab tenant farmers had accepted relocation money, many refused to move
- Unusually heavy rains and flooding ruined the fields that year, and in turn caused malaria-spreading mosquitoes to proliferate
- Many settlers died from snake poisoning or malaria;
- Bedouins killed livestock and contaminated the drinking supply;
- Money from Europe eventually dwindled.

The result was a village on the brink of starvation. Taub negotiated with the Jewish National Fund. Their agreement called for the land to be turned over to the JNF, the village to be moved off the hilltop, closer to the farming valley, for crops and orchards to replace dairy farming, for expert farmers from Hapoel Hamizrachi to join the community and be given land stakes, and for unproductive members of the community to return to Poland until the enterprise could support them. In return, the JNF provides funds to sustain the people and to seed the new enterprise.

By 1938, things were beginning to turn around, but were still shaky. Some wanted to return to Poland, but there was no money to buy them tickets. Simultaneously, some of the early investors wanted either the land they had been promised or their money back. Neither was possible, as the JNF had been given the land, and money was not yet available from the new enterprise. The investors were threatening him. Taub was forced to go to America to raise more funds.

== United States ==
Taub came to America as a fundraiser for Yabloner Hasidim, and to raise money to pay back investors, but after many setbacks, his life changed. He sent his wife back to Europe when he left for America.

=== Fundraising and war years ===
Taub's niece had a home in New York, where Taub stayed. He travelled and raised money from Zionist-friendly Orthodox communities, and from the American Federation for Polish Jews. That organisation bought 400 acres of land for Kfar Hasidim at his urging, for Jews to escape Poland to Palestine. But two months later, the Nazis invaded Poland. Taub was unable to return to Palestine to effectuate the plan. Desperate to do anything to help fight the Nazis, he began working as a laborer in war-related programs.

Taub moved west and found work in San Francisco and Los Angeles shipyards. At the time, he still used the title 'Yabloner Rebbe' and was shomer Shabbat, though he had begun using a new name, George Nagel, for work purposes.

=== New life ===
Reports of the annihilation of Polish Jewry caused Taub enormous distress. He had failed his Polish followers and sent many elderly and infirm emigrés back to Poland. He was also certain their remaining relatives in Kfar Hasidim blamed him for their deaths, though the Jewish National Fund had forced him to do so. Distraught, and believing he had no Hasidim left to call him Rebbe, he abandoned not only the title, but all the trappings of Orthodox Jewry.

The construction and drafting skills he had picked up in the shipyards were useful for starting a real estate and construction business. A few of his construction and real estate partners knew of his past life, as well as some minor Hasidic personalities based in Los Angeles. They protected his confidentiality, notably even when a Hasid recalled his experience with the Yabloner Rebbe in Europe in his presence.

When he was about 70, Taub suffered major financial setbacks. His business empire collapsing, he could not even pay the property tax on his developments. He became sick and was hospitalized. Some introspection prompted by sick visits from a journalist and a secularized Israeli relative, Top Gun author Ehud Yonay, led him to decide to pursue a college degree.

In 1972, upon becoming well again, Taub enrolled in San Fernando Valley State College, now California State University, Northridge (CSUN). He gained some public notoriety as the septuagenarian living in a dormitory with typical college kids. He earned a bachelor's degree in psychology in 1975. He completed a Master's dissertation in 1978, a book about his counseling of recovering drug addicts, named Paradise Cove—They Escaped the Cuckoo's Nest. The manuscript was believed lost for decades until two surviving copies were rediscovered and it was published in 2026 by Pini Dunner, generating renewed public interest in Taub’s life and work.

== Return ==
Upon completion of his graduate degree, he reluctantly agreed to take a trip to Israel, fearful of his reception by those who knew his past. His family quietly planned a grand reunion (without his knowledge) of his religious and pioneer followers and their families, both Hasidic and secular, welcoming him back. He agreed to move back permanently, but shuttled between Kfar Hasidim and Los Angeles regularly until 1981, settling his affairs. He also restarted Jewish religious practices as he came to realize that, despite the difficulties establishing Kfar Hasidim, the moshav had helped save many members of his community from the Nazi Holocaust. Speaking in front of the community at the grand reunion in Kfar Hasidim, he said "I never thought about the fact that I saved your lives, only about all the lives that were lost. I never thought about what I gave you, only about what I took away from you. But now it's all become clear.”

Upon his permanent return, he resumed his role as Yabloner Rebbe, serving quietly in that capacity in Kfar Hasidim for the last few years of his life.
