= Yechezkel Taub =

Yechezkel Taub may refer to:

- Yechezkel Taub, founding Grand Rabbi of the Kuzmir Hasidic sect
- Yechezkel Taub of Yablon, the final Grand Rabbi of the Yabloner Hasidic sect
