= Ben Zion Shenker =

American Hasidic composer and hazzan

Ben Zion Shenker בן-ציון בן מרדכי שענקער
- Born: May 12, 1925; Brooklyn, New York
- Died: November 20, 2016 (aged 91) Brooklyn, New York
- Genre: Hasidic music
- Occupations: Singer, Composer, Cantor; businessman (non-musical)
- Years active: 1938-2016

Ben Zion Shenker (1925–2016) was a world-renowned American Hasidic composer and hazzan (cantor), associated with the Modzitz hasidic dynasty. Shenker was born in the heyday of the American hazzan. He became interested in the art as a child, and was performing on radio by his early teens. Soon after, he became close to Rabbi Shaul Taub, the Holocaust-surviving Modzitz Grand Rabbi, who was known for his mystical Hasidic compositions. He dedicated much of his life to recording and publishing the large stock of pre-war Modzitz songs, as well as Taub's post-war work. Shenker created a music label, Neginah, for the purpose of recording those songs, and himself became a composer of hundreds Modzitz moded songs.

== Early life ==
Shenker's parents were Mordechai and Miriam Shenker, Polish hasidim who came to America about 1921. Their son was born four years later, and they raised him in Williamsburg. He had two brothers and a sister.

Even as a child, he showed interest in cantorial music, preferring to listen to greats such as Yossele Rosenblatt rather than play with toys. Joshua Samuel Weisser (originally Pilderwasser), known as the leading New York cantor of the 1930s, took Shenker into his choir at age 12. Weisser had a Yiddish-language radio program at the time, and Shenker was a soloist on it, with his own 15-minute weekly segment. In performance, mostly during prayers, he was described as having a reedy tenor and perfect pitch. Shenker also studied with teacher and conductor Seymour Silbermintz.

He attended Yeshiva Torah Vodaath, where he received weekly leave to go to the radio studio for his show, so long as he returned in time for the next study session.

He recorded an album at age 13.

When he was about 14 or 15 he visited Rabbi Shaul Taub's house. Taub was the leader of the Modzitz Hasidim, who were known for their often lengthy and sophisticated musical compositions. While there, the young Shenker sight-read some of Taub's sheet music, which surprised Taub, who asked him to serve as a music secretary. Part of Shenker's job was to write musical notation for Taub, including early drafts of unrecorded compositions.

== Adulthood ==
Shenker continued his studies in Yeshiva Torah Vodaath, and was ordained a rabbi. He married Dina Lustig, a Cincinnati native, in the late 1940s.

=== Music preservation ===
He started the Neginah label in 1956. The name is Hebrew for "playing of music." For its first album, Shenker trained a choir at the residence of the Bessers in Manhattan, former members of the congregation in Crown Heights. The selections consisted of devotional songs for the Saturday night meal known as Melave Malka.

Neginah eventually recorded a total of ten albums, including the most important songs in the traditional Modzitz repertoire, as well as Rabbi Taub's later works and many of Shenker's own 500-plus compositions. However, the main purpose was to record the legacy, over which Shenker was very concerned. Once, he became upset when he heard a rendition of an early Modzitz tune that he felt had become distorted; he felt the producers "had a lot of nerve" to make such changes. The Neginah catalog inspired other hasidic sects to similarly record their own musical history. Shenker's personal tape library of over 600 cassettes and reel is held at the Institute for Preservation and Documentation of Modzitz Music.

Though Hasidic songs starting in the late 20th century began to absorb American popular music styles, Shenker's songs are fully rooted in Eastern European Hasidic tradition and show little American influence. His influence extended outwards to the Klezmer scene as well as to recordings by Itzhak Perlman, Andy Statman, and the Israel Philharmonic Orchestra. He was known as the leading composer of music across the Hasidic spectrum.

=== Career and artistry ===
Velvel Pasternak, a Jewish music producer and historian, described Shenker's own melodies as "singable" by the masses. Many of Shenker's songs have become so much a part of the fabric of Ashkenazic Jewish Orthodox life that they are erroneously thought to be much older songs whose authorship is unknown. Shenker, a humble man, did not mind the anonymity, and was typically surprised when approached as a celebrity. Two songs in particular became global Sabbath meal standards (even in Sephardic homes, unusual for Ashkenazi material): Eishes Chayil (1946) on Friday nights, and variations of his Mizmor LeDovid (Psalm 23, 1953) on Saturday afternoons. His Yossis Alayich (1965) is also the most commonly used song for Jewish weddings, typically used as the opening song to the first dance at Orthodox weddings throughout the world.

Hankus Netsky compared the Modzitz music to symphonies, and stated that Shenker treated them with appropriate gravitas. Statman described the melodies as powerful enough to purify and to reach the stars, and Shenker's mastery of music color and ornamentation as incredible.

Shenker was the primary cantor at the Modzitz synagogue in Crown Heights, Brooklyn, and later in Midwood, Brooklyn. In the 1980s, he left the established Modzitz synagogue to form a second one, also in Midwood. He regularly composed new songs each year for the High Holidays. He was the rabbi of that synagogue until his death on November 20, 2016, of heart disease. He continued to record music until the last days of his life.

Shenker did not make a living from music, rarely collecting royalties. His family owned a sweater manufacturing business, and he was partner in a diamond dealership.

== Legacy ==
For his shloshim (ritual event on the 30th day of passing), Cantor Chaim Dovid Berson of New York's Jewish Center and musicians Shim Craimer and Yitzy Spinner performed some of Shenker's work.

He had three daughters: Esther Reifman, Adele Newmark, and Brocha Weinberger. When he died, he had 24 grandchildren and 90 great-grandchildren.

Shenker was a prolific artist, with his voice and compositions appearing on dozens of albums.

On February 27, 2022, Ben Zion Schenker was posthumously inducted with the inaugural class of the Jewish Music Hall of Fame.
