= Paradise Cove =

2026 posthumous memoir by Yechezkel Taub

Paradise Cove: They Escaped the Cuckoo’s Nest
- Editor: Rabbi Pini Dunner
- Author: George T. Nagel (Rabbi Yechezkel Taub)
- Genre: Memoir, autobiography
- Publisher: Manhattan Book Group
- Publication date: January 5, 2026
- Website: paradisecovebook.com

Paradise Cove: They Escaped the Cuckoo's Nest is a memoir written between 1975 and 1977 by George T. Nagel, the name used by Rabbi Yechezkel Taub (1895–1986), the third Yabloner Rebbe. The manuscript remained unpublished for nearly fifty years until it was located and edited by Rabbi Pini Dunner in the mid-2020s.

== Overview ==
Yechezkel Taub was born in Poland in 1895 into a Hasidic dynasty and later became the Yabloner Rebbe. In 1925, he led a group of followers to Mandatory Palestine to found an agricultural village called Kfar Hasidim as part of a pioneering effort connected to religious Zionism. Economic hardship, internal disputes, and the pressures of the settlement led him to step down from his role. In 1939, on the outbreak of the Second World War, Taub became stuck in the United States, having traveled there on a fundraising mission for Kfar Hasidim. Soon afterwards, he abandoned his role as a religious leader and no longer acted as an Orthodox Jew. From the early 1940s onward, Taub lived in Los Angeles under the name George Nagel.

Between 1975 and 1977, Taub wrote the manuscript titled Paradise Cove. The text was written in English and documents his volunteer service at a mental health facility in Northridge, California. It records his interactions with patients and staff and his observations on routine life at the institution. It also reflects the period in which he lived apart from his earlier identity and community.

The manuscript remained in private possession until it was found by Rabbi Dunner during research into Taub’s disappearance and later years. Dunner edited the manuscript and published the memoir as a book with a detailed introduction and his footnotes in 2026.

Reviewing the book, Ben Rothke wrote that "Paradise Cove is a book and a story that defies categorization – it is unique" in JewishLink.

In June 2026, Paradise Cove was named a finalist in the Memoirs (Historical/Legacy) category of the Next Generation Indie Book Awards.

In September 2026, Paradise Cove won the NYC Big Book Award in the Psychiatry/Psychology category.
