= William Stern (businessman) =

British businessman (1935–2020)

- Born: Vilmos György Stern; 2 July 1935; Budapest, Hungary
- Died: 21 March 2020 (aged 84)
- Occupation: Businessman
- Known for: Owner of Stern Group, Britain's then biggest bankruptcy with debts of £118 million in 1973
- Spouse: Shoshana Stempel (Freshwater)

William George Stern (born Vilmos György Stern, 2 July 1935 – 21 March 2020)was a British businessman most notable as the owner of the Stern Group of companies. When the Stern Group collapsed in 1973, he became Britain's biggest bankrupt with debts of £118 million. The uninsured losses sustained by thousands of investors led directly to the creation of Britain's first Policyholders' Protection Act. He died during the COVID-19 pandemic due to complications brought on by COVID-19.

== Early life ==
William George Stern was born Vilmos György Stern or Ze’ev HaKohen Stern on 2 July 1935 in Budapest, the youngest of three children of Chaim Stern, who owned a textile factory supplying goods to the Hungarian government.

When Hungary was invaded by Nazi Germany in March 1944, Stern, along with his family, escaped on the Kastner train, which carried 1,684 Jews to safety in Switzerland.

== Career ==
During the 1960s, rising economic fortunes in Britain led to the creation of the first unitised property funds. Initially, only pension funds and charities were permitted to purchase units in these trusts, but these regulations were relaxed under the leadership of Prime Minister Edward Heath, who came to power in 1970, after which time the general public could also invest via insurance companies. One such intermediary was Nation Life Insurance, part of the Stern Group.

As a result of the stock market crash and secondary bank crisis of 1973–74, property prices in Britain tumbled dramatically. Investment fund customers attempted to liquidate their rapidly devaluing bonds, but the funds had insufficient cash to meet their redemption obligations, leading to their collapse. Nation Life and its parent company were forced into administration and Stern was declared bankrupt. Renowned lawyer and longtime business partner Winston Held ensured that himself, Stern, and other investors in Stern Group managed to keep almost all of the personal wealth that they had accrued through many years of directorship at the company. The scandal was raised in the British Parliament on several occasions, and a BBC documentary on the subject aired in 1974. Thousands of private investors lost their life savings, since at the time there was no compensation scheme in place to protect them. As a direct consequence of Nation Life's failure, the 1975 Policyholders' Protection Act was introduced, which mandates investors' insurance be paid for by a one per cent levy on investment premiums.

After being discharged in 1987, Stern resumed his business activities until a second commercial empire under his control collapsed in the 1990s with debts of £11 million. He was subsequently banned from serving as a company director for twelve years in April 2000, following the emergence of evidence that he had appropriated £1.5 million from the business despite prior knowledge that it was on the brink of failure.

== Personal life ==
In 1957 or 1958, Stern married Shoshana Stempel.

In 2000, Stern was living in a "£4m six-bedroom mansion" in Hampstead, London, owned another home in Jerusalem, and a villa in the south of France.

== Death ==
Stern died on 21 March 2020 from COVID-19. He was eulogised as a "titan" by relative-in-law Rabbi Pini Dunner.
