= Aba Dunner =

Aba (Avrohom Moshe) Dunner (13 November 1937 – 17 July 2011) was a social and religious activist, who represented and worked for the interests of European Jewry, first as the personal assistant to Rabbi Solomon Schonfeld, then as Secretary to the British office of Agudat Israel, and in his latter years as Executive Director of the Conference of European Rabbis. Although born in pre-war Europe, Aba spent the majority of his life in England, where he was active in both communal work and the business world.

== Early years ==
Aba Dunner was born in Königsberg (today known as Kaliningrad), then part of Germany, on 13 November 1937. His father was Rabbi Josef Hirsch Dunner, a scion of the distinguished Dunner family of Cologne, and from 1936 chief rabbi of East Prussia. His mother, Ida, was the daughter of Dr Wilhelm (Zev) Freyhan, a leading member of the Jewish community of Breslau, and one of the original founders of Agudat Israel at the Kattowitz Conference of 1912. Ida's mother came from the illustrious Hackenbroch family of Frankfurt-am-Main; her great-grandfather was part of the original strictly orthodox group who split off from the main community and invited Rabbiner Samson Rafael Hirsch to lead a breakaway community.

== Arrival in England ==
As the officially recognised Jewish religious leader of East Prussia, Josef Dunner was arrested on Kristallnacht; the Nazis were unable to transport him to concentration camp in Germany, however, as the Poles would not allow the transfer of political prisoners through the Polish Corridor. As the Nazi authorities considered their options, Ida got in contact with Solomon Schonfeld, and was able to obtain through him a rabbi's visa, enabling the small family to come to England via the Netherlands in December 1938. On arrival in London, the Dunners settled briefly in Golders Green. Before very long Josef was asked to become the rabbi of Westcliff, until 1940, when he was briefly interned as an enemy alien on the Isle of Man. On his release, Josef was appointed as a rabbi to immigrant and evacuated Jews in Leicester, where the family remained until 1947.

== Stamford Hill ==
In 1947, Schonfeld arranged for the Dunners to move to Stamford Hill, north London, where Josef established and ran the Beth Jacob seminary for girls. He went on, in 1960, to replace Schonfeld as rabbi of the Adath Yisrael Synagogue, and as the presiding rabbi of the Union of Orthodox Hebrew Congregations, the most senior religious position within the strictly orthodox community of the UK. Aba attended Yesodey Hatorah School, completing his high school education at the Gateshead Jewish Boarding School, where his classmates included Rabbi Avrohom Gurwicz, Rabbi Matisyohu Salomon, and Rabbi Chaim Kaufman, all of whom went on to become leading figures in orthodox Jewish education in the UK and beyond. After leaving school, Aba learned in yeshiva in Kapellen, Belgium, and then in Luzern, Switzerland, where he studied under Rabbi Moshe Soloveitchik, with whom he maintained contact throughout the remainder of his life.

== After Yeshiva ==
In 1957 a sudden stomach illness brought him home from yeshiva and confined him to the Jewish Hospital in the East End of London for several months. Having decided not to return to yeshiva, Aba began to try out a variety of jobs, including selling fabric and working at a butcher shop, to see what career he should choose. Although a brilliant salesman, no job in the commercial arena appealed to his instinctive desire to be involved in communal activism. So, in 1959 he was engaged by Rabbi Schonfeld to be his personal assistant. Within a matter of months Schonfeld dispatched him across Europe to explore the idea of creating an organization which would unite all the strictly orthodox communities of Europe. Schonfeld then sent Aba to the still nascent State of Israel, to see whether one could build small synagogues, to be referred to as community centres, in the many secular kibbutzim that existed there. To reach Israel, Aba drove from London to Naples, Italy, in a Land-Rover, and took a ship to Israel, landing in Haifa just in time for the Independence Day celebrations of 1959.

== Marriage ==
In 1960 Aba married Miriam (1941–2006), daughter of Arthur "Adje" (Uri) Cohen (1910–2000) of Rotterdam. During the Nazi occupation of the Netherlands, Arthur Cohen was a leading member of the Dutch Underground resistance movement, and after the war he was instrumental in the re-establishment of the Jewish community in the Netherlands; as late as the mid-1970s, when already in his 60s, he established a school for strictly-orthodox boys and girls in Amsterdam, known as the "cheider". The young couple initially set up home in Stamford Hill, close to Aba's parents, and then in 1976 they moved to Golders Green. During this time they had five children, Yitzchok (born 1961), Benzi (1962–2008), Hadassa (born 1963), Zev (born 1967), and Pini (born 1970). After the death of his first wife Aba married Charlotte Howard who he spent his final years with.

== Agudat Israel ==
In 1960 Aba began to work for the British division of Agudat Israel, an international strictly-orthodox Jewish lobbying organisation and political movement. In the ensuing decade he became involved in a variety of international Jewish initiatives, through his close contact with a whole range of influential orthodox Jewish figures, including, in the UK, Harry Goodman, Simcha Bunim Unsdorfer, in Israel, Rabbi Shlomo Lorincz and Rabbi Menachem Porush, and in the United States Rabbi Moshe Sherer. His job entailed working as the “pointman” for the World Agudah Movement in Europe - if something needed to be done, he was the local contact to organise it. Aba also established close links with many of the leading rabbinic luminaries of the time, whom he consulted for advice, and whom he offered his services - men such as Rabbi Leib Gurwicz, Rabbi Avrohom Babad, Rabbi Yitzchok Hutner, Rabbi Moshe Feinstein, Rabbi Eliezer Menachem Schach, and Rabbi Yosef Kahaneman, the Ponovezh Rav. When Rabbi Aron Kotler, the distinguished and revered head of Beth Medrash Govoha in Lakewood, New Jersey, was in London raising funds for Chinuch Atzmai, Aba acted as his driver, and he performed the same service for senior rabbinic leader of the US, Rabbi Eliezer Silver, President of the Union of Orthodox Rabbis of the United States and Canada.

== Outreach in Scandinavia ==
During the 1960s Aba became a pioneer of the Kiruv, or Jewish Outreach, movement that gathered pace in the following decade, when he established an organisation to teach Judaism to the children of the many Holocaust survivors who had settled in Denmark, Norway and Sweden after World War II. The parents were by-and-large disenchanted with their religious origins, but the children were often curious to find more about their heritage. Aba and his wife, organised weekend retreats, in both England and Sweden, resulting in many of these children returning to the Jewish religious fold.

== In the business world ==
In 1970 Aba became the executive director of the charitable foundation that had recently been set up by William Stern, a property mogul and philanthropist based in London, and in this role he was responsible for the allocation of large amounts of charity funds to numerous Jewish causes across the world. He combined this with his work for Agudat Israel, until 1972, when he began working for Stern full-time, both in his charitable endeavours, and in his commercial endeavours. During the 1980s Aba began to work in West Africa, exporting consumer goods and industrial machinery to countries such as Nigeria, Gabon and Togo.

== Revival of Eastern European Jewry ==
In the late 1980s and early 1990s Aba began his involvement with the Jewish Communities of Eastern Europe. Agudat Israel began a project called Operation Open Curtain and Aba, acting on their behalf in a voluntary capacity, travelled regularly to Russia, becoming involved in the appointment of rabbis such as Rabbi Pinchas Goldschmidt in Moscow and Rabbi Yaakov Bleich in Ukraine, as well as supporting the establishment of a yeshiva in Moscow at the behest of his childhood mentor Rabbi Moshe Soloveitchik.

Aba's knowledge of European communities as well as his diplomatic and organisational skills eventually prompted the emeritus Chief Rabbi of Great Britain, Lord Immanuel Jakobovits, to ask him to work full-time for the Conference of European Rabbis, of which he was President. In 1997 Aba became Director of Community Affairs for the CER, and in 2003 he took over from Rabbi Moshe Rose as executive director. The CER, which had been founded in 1956, had always been a small outfit which ran conferences for rabbis every couple of years in different European cities. Aba's vision gave it the impetus to grow and raised its political profile with national governments across Europe and particularly within the organs of the EU. As a result of his leadership, the CER has now got an office in Brussels and is the sole Jewish religious representative body recognized by the EU.

Aba was also deeply involved in interfaith work, particularly to try to forge links between Jews and moderate Muslims. For this purpose he travelled to meet with Muslim religious leaders, including a high-profile visit to Kazakhstan.

In the last years of his life Aba suffered, in quick succession, the loss of his wife, son, and both his parents. In addition to this he endured ill-health, often leading to near death experiences. Despite these setbacks he remained actively involved in Jewish affairs, travelling across the globe as an ambassador for orthodox Judaism and its adherents. In 2008 he remarried, and for the final 3 years of his life his wife Charlotte acted as his assistant in the many projects in which he was involved.

== Death ==
Immediately following Passover 2011 Aba was admitted to a hospital in London after suffering from terrible discomfort over the festival period. He was quickly diagnosed with terminal cancer, and he died at the London Clinic with his family at his side on Sunday, 17 July 2011. The following day he was buried at the Adath Yisrael Cemetery, in Enfield, north London. A large number of tributes to him were issued by leading Jewish figures and organisations after his death. The World Jewish Congress, the leading Jewish diaspora representative body, issued a statement which said: "[Aba Dunner] was one of the leading activists for the cause of Orthodox Judaism over the past decades and was widely respected across the Jewish world. He was at the heart of the building and strengthening Jewish institutions in Europe. Within the World Jewish Congress, Rabbi Dunner and the Conference of European Rabbis – which he led for many years – were actively engaged in addressing the concerns of Jews and Jewish communities and in strengthening dialogue with other faith communities. He was a dedicated fighter for achieving peace and freedom for all peoples, irrespective of their origin, religion or ethnic background."
