= Krailling double homicide =

Double homicide

The Krailling double homicide occurred on March 24, 2011. Two sisters, eleven-year-old Sharon and eight-year-old Chiara, were found dead by their mother and her partner at their home in Krailling, Bavaria (Germany). One week later, their uncle, Thomas Selmayr, was arrested on suspicion of their murder based on a DNA profile. On April 16, 2012, Thomas Selmayr was convicted and sentenced to life imprisonment.

== Background ==
Anette Selmayr, 41, and her daughters Sharon and Chiara lived separately from husband and father in a flat on Margaretenstraße 20 in Krailling, Bavaria. Her new partner Klaus Paulus ran a pub called Schabernack in the town where she regularly used to work. Despite the separation, the two girls saw their father regularly.

Thomas Selmayr, who took his wife's name, was the husband of Anette's sister. He, his wife and their four children moved into an unfinished house in Peißenberg in 2010. They were not able to pay back the loans, so Thomas Selmayr tried to force his wife's sister Anette S. to sell a flat the two sisters owned together and give his family the money, which she denied.

== Murders ==
Thomas Selmayr wanted to kill his sister-in-law and his nieces so his wife would be the sole heir of the flat, another flat Annette S. owned, and the heritage of the 98-year-old grandmother. He hoped that this way the family would be able to pay back their loans and would be able to help one of their children who is disabled.

On March 23, 2011, Anette S. left her two daughters Sharon and Chiara alone in their home in Krailling, to work in a nearby pub, only a few minutes away from her home, that was owned by her new partner. The door of the house was not locked because the mother feared the girls were not able to save themselves from fire if the door was locked. Thomas S. knew this and used it for his plan: he invaded the house and killed his nieces around 2:00 or 2:30 a.m. The investigators reconstructed that eight-year-old Chiara was first strangled with a rope. Sharon woke up and went to her sister's room. The murderer left the unconscious Chiara alone and chased Sharon through the house. In the kitchen, she was attacked with a barbell. After hitting her two times onto the head, the murderer took a knife from the kitchen and stabbed the girl; the autopsy later counted five wounds, as far as 17 centimeters (6-7 inches) deep. Chiara woke up from her unconsciousness and overheard the attack on her sister. She tried to block the door, but the murderer pushed her away, smashed her head with the barbell and cut her carotid artery. Both bodies also bore scattered hematomae. The autopsy was not able to determine which were the fatal wounds, as there were multiple potentially fatal wounds.

Selmayr also planned to drown their mother in the bathtub, so it would have looked like an extended suicide of the mother; however, he changed this plan because she did not come home early enough and he feared that it would not be possible to cover the crime, because it was nearly dawn.

At 5:00 a.m., Annette and her partner came back home and found the horribly mangled bodies of the two girls.

== Investigation ==
After the police arrived on the crime scene, the Bavarian police and the Federal Criminal Police Office of Germany (Bundeskriminalamt) started their investigation. The murderer wounded himself several times during his slaughter, so DNA-material was found. The crime shocked Bavaria and was topic of the German and Austrian medias for days, so the help of the local people was immense. After testing 91 saliva samples which had been given voluntarily from local people, Selmayr was arrested only nine days after the murders, meanwhile in Krailling the two girls were buried.

== Criminal trial ==
On January 17, 2012, the murder trial started in Munich. The accused first tried to explain his blood on the crime scene with a nose bleed he had during an earlier visit, which he cleaned up with Sharon, when the court asked him how such a large amount of his blood was found all over the house as a result of a nosebleed, Selmayr answered: "Da müssen sie Sharon schon selber fragen!" ("Ask Sharon if you want to know!"). At the last part of the trial, Selmayr claimed that his blood that was found on the crime scene was put there by criminal officers in order to frame him, which was refuted by the fact that the blood was found and analysed before Selmayr was under suspicion. At last, even his defense lawyers distanced themselves from their client. On April 16, 2012, Selmayr was convicted and sentenced to life imprisonment.
