= Kuzmir (Hasidic dynasty) =

Polish Hasidic dynasty

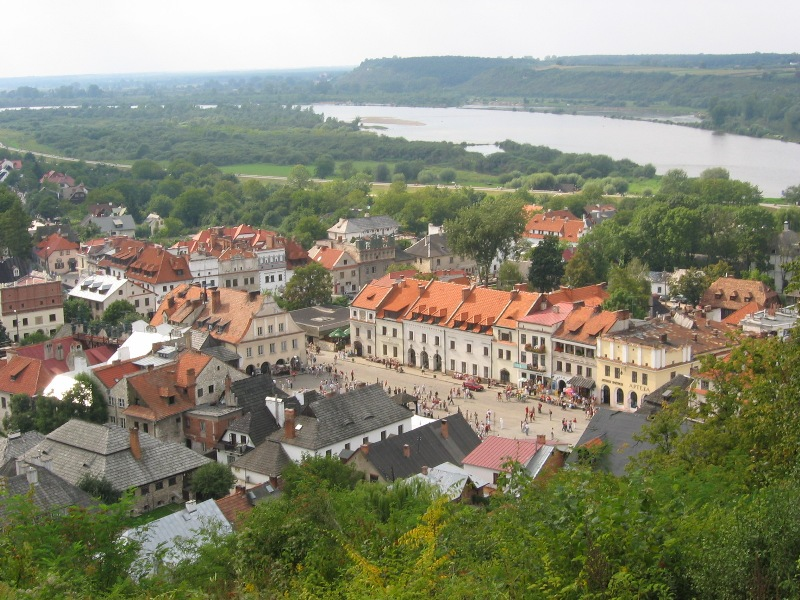
The town of Kuzmir, known in Polish as Kazimierz Dolny

Kuzmir is a Hasidic dynasty founded by Rebbe Yechezkel Taub (1772–1856), a disciple of Yaakov Yitzchak (the Seer of Lublin), Yisroel Hopstein (the Kozhnitser Magid) and Shmuel of Karov. Kuzmir is the Yiddish name of Kazimierz Dolny, a town in present-day Poland. The dynasty's branches include the Yablono, Zvolin and Modzitz dynasties, as well as Kfar Hasidim, a moshav in Israel.

The title of Kuzmirer Rebbe was revived for its current holder, Rebbe Pinchas Moshe Taub, the brother of the present Modzitzer Rebbe.

== Lineage ==
- Grand Rabbi Yechezkel Taub of Kuzmir (died 1856)
  - Grand Rabbi David Zvi of Yablona (d. 1882), son of the Kuzmirer, disciple of Menachem Mendel Morgensztern of Kotzk
  - Grand Rabbi Shmuel Eliyahu Taub of Zvolin (d. 1888), son of the Kuzmirer
    - Grand Rabbi Moshe Aharon of Zvolin (d. 1918)
    - Grand Rabbi Yisrael Taub of Modzitz, (1849–1920), author of Divrei Yisrael, son of the Zvoliner
      - Grand Rabbi Shaul Yedidya Elazar Taub of Modzitz (1886–1947), author of Imrei Shaul and Yisa Bracha, son of the Divrei Yisrael
        - Grand Rabbi Shmuel Eliyahu Taub (1905–1984), the Imrei Eish, son of the Imrei Shaul
          - Grand Rabbi Yisrael Dan Taub of Modzitz (1928–2006), author of Nachalas Dan, son of the Imrei Aish
            - Grand Rabbi Chaim Shaul Taub of Modzitz, current Modzitzer Rebbe in Israel, son of the Nachalas Dan
            - Grand Rabbi Pinchas Moshe Taub of Kuzmir, son of the Nachalas Dan

== History ==
=== Grand Rabbi Yechezkel Taub ===
Yechezkel Taub was born in Płońsk in 1772. His father was Tzvi Hersh.

Taub was a student of the Chozeh of Lublin and the Kohznitzer Maggid and he established yeshivas and a type of Hasidic teaching that was similar to that of his rebbes. He grew famous for his musical talents and composed many Hasidic melodies.

He died in Kuzmir on the 17th day of Shevat in 1856. Thousands of Jews, including Rabbi Shlomo Rabinowicz of Radomsk, Rabbi Nosson Dovid of Shidlovtza and Rabbi Yisroel Yitzchok of Radoshitz escorted the deceased to his burial.

Taub's teachings are collected in Neḥmad mi-zahav (1909).

=== Grand Rabbi Pinchas Moshe Taub ===
Rabbi Pinchas Moshe Taub is the second son of the fourth Modzhitzer Rebbe, Rabbi Yisrael Dan Taub, while his older brother, Rabbi Chaim Shaul Taub, is the fifth and current Modzhitzer Rebbe as of 2022.

In 2020, Taub collapsed at his granddaughter's wedding in Bnei Brak. He was hospitalized in critical condition, but later recovered.

=== Yabloner Rebbes ===
The Yabloner Chasidus was started by a grandson of the first Kuzmirer Rebbe, Rabbi Yechezkel, and continued for three generations. The Yabloner lineage consisted of Rabbi Yosef Moshe Taub, Rabbi Yaakov Taub, and the final Rebbe leading up to the Holocaust, Rabbi Yechezkel Taub, named after the Kuzmir founding rebbe. The latter started moving the chasidus toward religious Zionism, and founded Kfar Hasidim. He became irreligious for about 40 years after the Holocaust mostly destroyed his following. He returned to Orthodox Judaism and to his role as Rebbe at Kfar Hasidim in the last few years of his life.

== See also ==
- History of the Jews in Poland
