= Modzitz =

Polish Hasidic dynasty

Modzitz Hasidic Dynasty
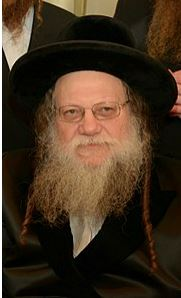
- Rabbi Chaim Shaul Taub of Modzitz

Founder
- Rabbi Yechezkel Taub

Regions with significant populations
- Israel, United States, Canada

Religions
- Hasidic Judaism

Modzitz, or Modzhitz, is the name of a Hasidic group within Orthodox Judaism that derives its name from Modrzyce, one of the boroughs of the town of Dęblin, Poland, located on the Vistula River.

Followers of this group are known as Modzitzer Hasidim, and are now based mainly in Bnei Brak (where one of the current Modzitzer Rebbes lives), and Jerusalem, Israel. They also have a smaller following in the United States, in Brooklyn (where the other current Modzitzer Rebbe lives), Monsey, New York, and Los Angeles, and in Toronto in Canada.

The Modzitzer rebbes are well known for their musical compositions, many of which were recorded by Ben Zion Shenker. The rebbes of Modzitz and their followers have composed over 4,000 nigunim.

== Forerunners ==
=== Rebbe Yechezkel Taub of Kuzmir (1755–1856) ===
The dynasty started with Rebbe Yechezkel Taub of Kuzmir, (1755–1856), who established yeshivas and a type of Hasidic teaching that was similar to that of his rebbes, the Seer of Lublin and the Kozhnitser Magid, and distinct from the Hasidism of Kotzk.

=== Rebbe Shmuel Eliyahu Taub of Zvolin ===
Upon the death of Rebbe Yechezkel Taub of Kuzmir in 1856, his son, Shmuel Eliyahu Taub of Zvolin, Poland, succeeded him as Rebbe. He excelled in Torah scholarship and creating Hasidic songs. He was called Menagen mafli pla'os, Hebrew for "[a] wondrous musical talent". When he died in 1888, his first son, Rabbi Moshe Aharon (1837 – March 17, 1918), succeeded him as Rebbe of Zvolin, while his second son, Rebbe Yisrael, went on to found the Modzitz Hasidic dynasty.

== Rebbe Yisrael Taub (1849–1920) ==
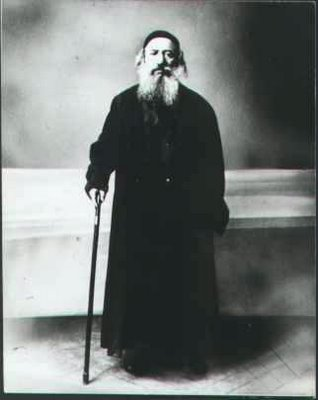

Rebbe Yisrael Taub, second son of Rebbe Shmuel Eliyahu Taub of Zvolin, was born in 1849. In 1888, he succeeded his father as a rebbe of the Zvoliner Hasidim. In 1891, he settled in Modrzyc, a village near the town of Demblin, Poland. He became known as the Modzhitzer Rebbe (after his place of residence), thus establishing the dynasty of Modzhitz. He composed many melodies that are still sung by Hasidim and others today. He suffered from diabetes, and in 1913, he traveled to Professor Israel in Berlin. The only way to save his life was by amputating his gangrenous leg (a consequence of diabetes). Before the operation, the rebbe observed the beautiful Berlin architecture, which upset him by comparison with the desolation of the holy city of Jerusalem. During the operation, he composed his epic masterpiece, based on the words of Eleh Ezkero (recited on Yom Kippur). Modzhitzer Hasidim sing this tune each year when they gather to commemorate his yahrzeit.

His teachings on Breishis, Shemos, and Vayikra have been collected in his work Divrei Yisrael. Unfortunately, the writings on Bamidbar and Devarim were lost. In 2008, his great-grandson, known as the Grand Rabbi of Modzitz, Rabbi Yisrael Dovid Taub, printed a collection of his teachings on Bamidbar and Devarim, and his own works based on his grandfather's previously printed works. These works were accepted in the world as the original parts of Divrei Yisrael.

When he died on 24 November 1920, he was succeeded by his son, Rebbe Shaul Yedidya Elazar Taub.

== Rebbe Shaul Yedidya Elazar Taub (1886–1947) ==
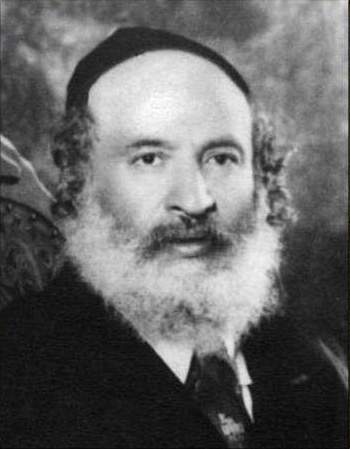

Rebbe Shaul Yedidya Elazar Taub was born on 20 October 1886. He married the daughter of the Grand Rabbi of Lublin, Rabbi Avrohom Eiger, author of the Shevet MeYehuda. They had a son, [Shmuel Eliyahu], and a daughter. By the age of 19, he divorced her; the children, Shmuel Eliyahu and Golda were divided.His daughter was raised by her mother; his son in Rabbi Yisroel's home. He remarried to the daughter of the great kabbalist Rabbi Shaul Schwartz Rav of Stepantz in Poland, and by him, he learned and studied kabbalah. From his second wife, he had two sons and two daughters. His son, Rabbi Yehoshua Yecheskel, who was his right hand in all his Rabbinical subjects. Rabbi Yehoshua Yecheskel also printed his works on the "Hagada shel Pesach" under the name "Ishei Yisrael". Unfortunately, Rabbi Yehoshua Yecheskel was a very weak person physically, and he died at a very young age, a short time after his father (1952); so, though he was offered it, he refused to take over the Rabbinical throne of the Modzitz dynasty. But in later years, his only son, Grand Rabbi Yisrael Dovid Taub, and renewed the Modzitz dynasty in the United States in his shul in Flatbush.

R. Shaul subsequently married the daughter of the Bochner Rav, a great-grandson of R. Chaim Sanzer. They had four children, two sons and two daughters.

Rabbi Shaul Yedidya guided his Hasidim in Poland until September 1939, when he fled Poland due to Nazi persecution. He travelled to Vilna, Lithuania, Russia, and from there made his way to Japan. Eventually, with the help of some Modzitzer Hasidim, he and some family members reached the shores of San Francisco, and then moved to Brooklyn, New York, in 1940. It was during his stay in Brooklyn that Rebbe Shaul Yedidya Elazar became popular and helped rebuild Modzitz. He was a gifted songwriter, and wrote over 1,000 Hasidic melodies. He had an intense love for the Land of Israel, . He was unable to see the realization of his prediction, and he died on November 29, 1947, the day the UN voted to create the State of Israel. He was the last person to be buried on the Mount of Olives until it was liberated in 1967. His teachings have been collected in the volumes of Imrei Shaul and Yisa Bracha. He was succeeded by his oldest son, Rebbe Shmuel Eliyahu Taub, in Tel Aviv.

== Rebbe Shmuel Eliyahu Taub (1905–1984) ==
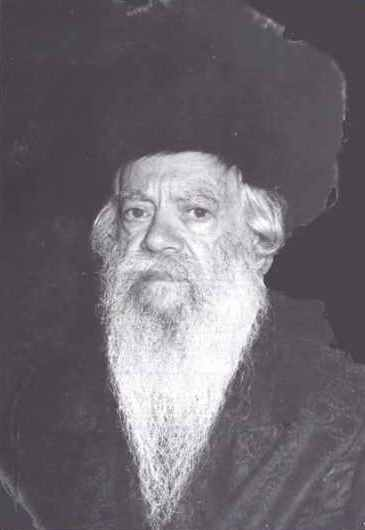

Rebbe Shmuel Eliyahu was born in Lublin, Poland, on 9 February 1905. In 1935, Rebbe Shaul Yedidya Elazar and his son Rabbi Shmuel went on a pilgrimage to the then-British Mandate of Palestine. While they were there, R. Shmuel fell in love with the Land of Israel, and asked his father if he could stay there. His father agreed, and within a year, Rabbi Shmuel's wife and their child came over to Israel. After his father's death in 1947, he succeeded his father as the Modzitzer Rebbe, to be known later as the Imrei Eish ("Words of Fire"). He continued the traditions of Modzitz, both as a composer and as a Torah scholar. He died on 6 May 1984 (4 Iyar 5744), when he was succeeded in Israel by his only son, Rebbe Yisrael Dan Taub.

== Rebbe Yisrael Dan Taub (1928–2006) ==
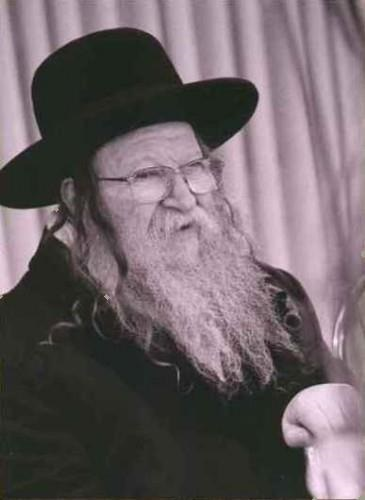

Rebbe Yisrael Dan was born in 1928 in Warsaw, Poland, and died on 16 June 2006 (20 Sivan 5766). He came with his mother to Palestine in 1936 to meet up with his father, Rebbe Shmuel Eliyahu. For a number of years, he headed the Modzitz Hasidim in the city of Tel Aviv, where his father had lived. On Lag Ba'omer 5755 (18 May 1995), he moved the headquarters of Modzitz to a new building in Bnei Brak, Israel. Like his predecessors, he composed numerous Hasidic melodies, and many of them are sung regularly in Hasidic synagogues. His opinion was highly regarded, and he was a member of the Council of Torah Sages of Agudat Israel. A collection of his Hasidic teachings was published as Nachalas Dan ("The Inheritance of Dan", the name by which he came to be known post-humously). Rebbe Yisrael Dan was survived by two sons and two daughters. At his funeral, his elder son, Grand Rabbi Chaim Shaul Taub, was crowned as the new Modzitzer Rebbe. His other son, Rabbi Pinchas Moshe Taub, was later crowned as the Kuzmirer Rebbe.

== Rebbe Chaim Shaul Taub ==
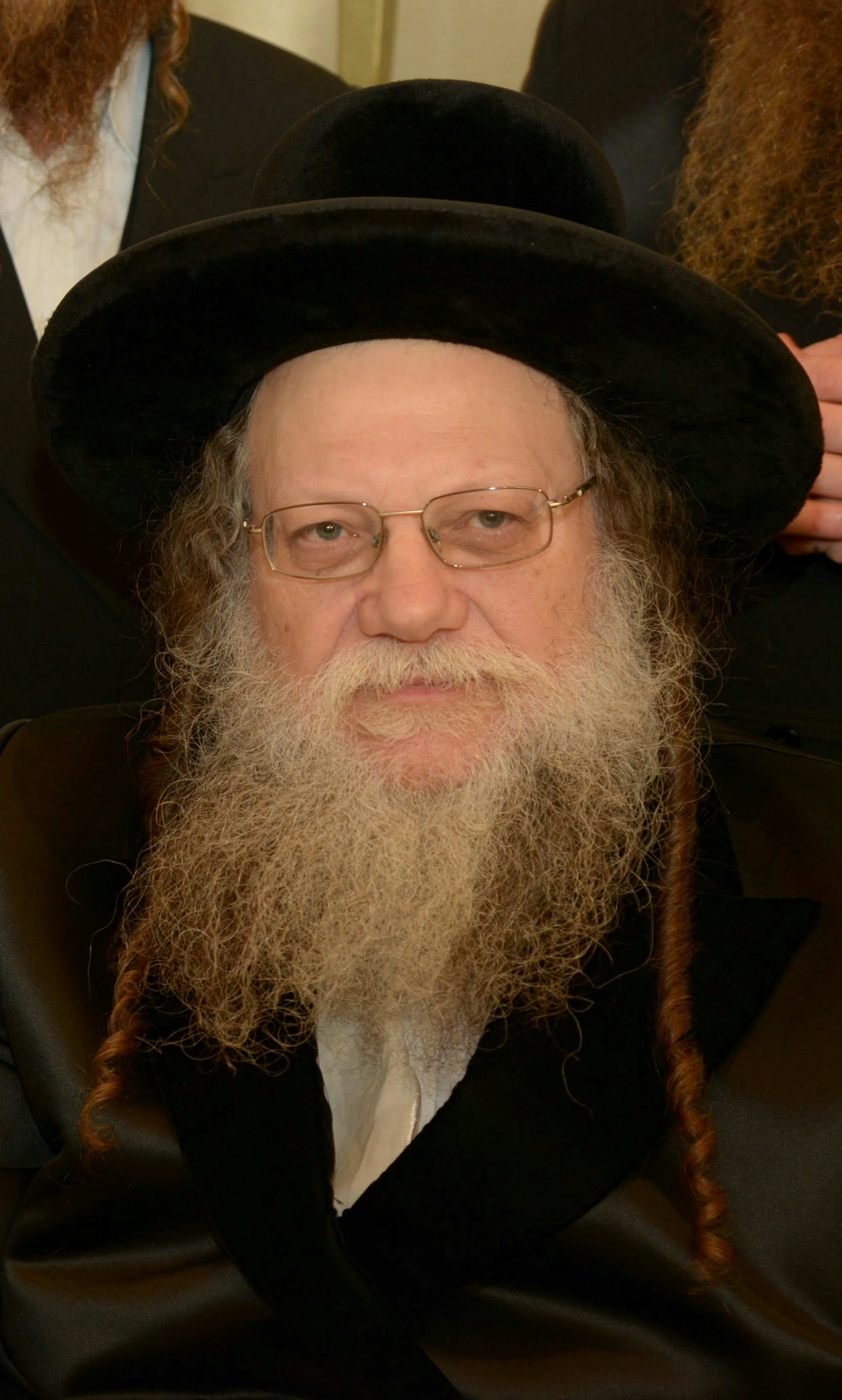

Rebbe Chaim Shaul served for many years as rosh yeshiva of Yeshivas Imrei Shaul and Darkhei Torah in Bnei Brak. In keeping with the long-standing tradition of Modzitz, the Rebbe composed ten new niggunim for Rosh Hashana of 5767, and twelve new niggunim for 5768 (corresponding to September 2006 and 2007), some of which have become popular among Haredi Jews in Israel.

== Lineage ==
- Grand Rabbi Yechezkel Taub of Kuzmir (d. 1856)
  - Grand Rabbi Shmuel Eliyahu Taub of Zvolin (d. 1888), son of the Kuzmirer
    - Grand Rabbi Yisrael Taub of Modzitz, (1849–1920), author of Divrei Yisrael, son of the Zvoliner
      - Grand Rabbi Shaul Yedidya Elazar Taub of Modzitz (1886–1947), author of Imrei Shaul and Yisa Bracha, son of the Divrei Yisrael
        - Grand Rabbi Shmuel Eliyahu Taub (1905–1984), the Imrei Eish, son of the Imrei Shaul
          - Grand Rabbi Yisrael Dan Taub of Modzitz (1928–2006), author of Nachalas Dan, son of the Imrei Aish
            - Grand Rabbi Chaim Shaul Taub of Modzitz, current Modzitzer Rebbe in Israel, son of the Nachalas Dan
        - Grand Rabbi Yisroel Dovid Taub of Modzitz, current Modziter Rebbe In America, grandson of the Imrei Shaul

== See also ==
- History of the Jews in Poland
- Dęblin–Irena Ghetto
