= Pini Dunner =

British Orthodox rabbi

Rabbi Pinchas Eliezer Dunner
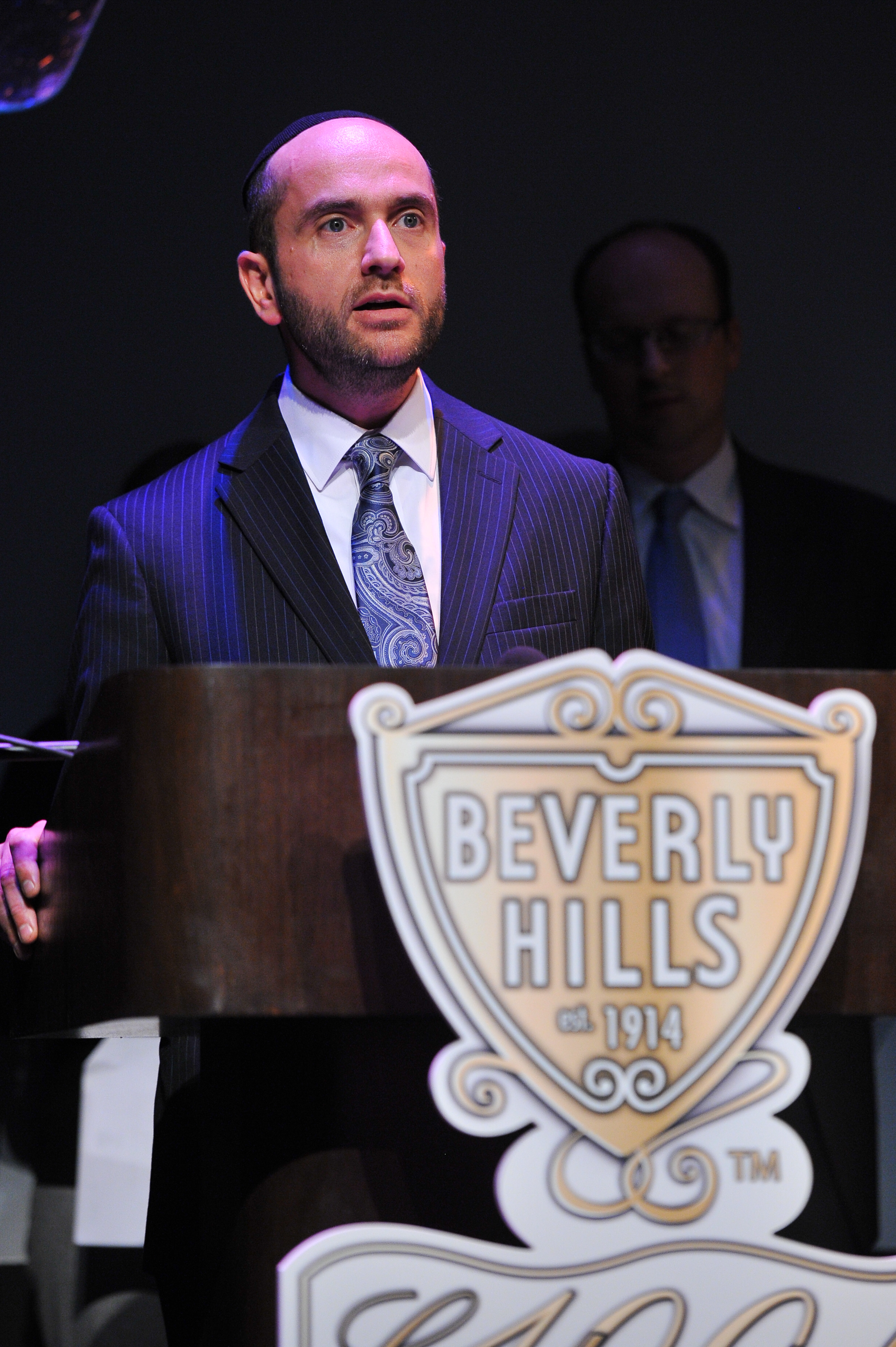
- Born: September 25, 1970; London, United Kingdom
- Other name: Pini
- Occupations: Rabbi, Teacher, Jewish Historian
- Spouse: Sabine Ackerman
- Children: Shoshana Giahn; Dalia Wizman; Shlomo Dunner; Eli Dunner; Meir Dunner; Uri Dunner
- Website: rabbidunner.com

Pinchas Eliezer "Pini" Dunner (born September 25, 1970) is a British Orthodox rabbi based in California.

== Early life ==
Dunner was born in London, UK. His father, Aba Dunner (1937–2011), was a Jewish community activist, acting on behalf of European Jewry. His grandfather, Rabbi Josef Hirsch Dunner (1913–2007), was the last Chief Rabbi of East Prussia before World War II, and later presiding Rabbi of the Union of Orthodox Hebrew Congregations in London, where he led the strictly orthodox community for over 50 years.

Dunner spent his early years in the North London neighborhood of Stamford Hill. In 1976 his family moved to Golders Green, a suburb in North West London with a large Jewish community.

After high school Dunner attended rabbinical seminaries in Gateshead Talmudical College, Baltimore, and Yeshiva Mercaz Hatorah in Jerusalem. In 1992 he was ordained as a rabbi by Beth Medrash Govoha, the largest Orthodox postgraduate rabbinical seminary in the United States. That same year Dunner was accepted into the Jewish History honors program at University College London. He graduated in 1996.

== Personal life ==
Dunner is married to Sabine, née Ackerman, and they have six children. He is known for his extensive collection of Jewish controversy-related items, including books, periodicals, and manuscripts. He also began a series of online lectures about his collection at the beginning of the COVID-19 pandemic.

== Career ==
In the winter of 1991 Dunner moved to Moscow where he served as the assistant rabbi at Moscow Choral Synagogue.

In 1996 Dunner took over the failing daily Jewish radio program broadcast by Spectrum Radio, a multi-ethnic radio station based in Battersea, London. Under his direction, the two-hour daily radio show became known for interviews with leading British and Israeli politicians, as well as for detailed news reports from Israel and the Jewish world.

In 1998 Dunner was invited by a group of philanthropists to set up and lead a synagogue, called the Saatchi Synagogue, in Maida Vale, West London. “The Saatchi”, as it became known, quickly became a magnet for single postgraduate professional Jews wishing to meet each other in a friendly, non-coercive environment, although the unorthodox nature of its promotion techniques and social events resulted in criticism from the conservative British Jewish establishment.

In 2002, Dunner appeared on the popular BBC television motoring series Top Gear, coming fifth in the first-ever "Fastest Faith" competition.

In 2004, Dunner left Saatchi Synagogue and joined his family's real estate business.

In 2019, Dunner authored a book, "Mavericks, Mystics and False Messiahs," which was nominated as a finalist for the National Jewish Book Award.

== California ==
In the Summer of 2011 Dunner was approached to take up a senior faculty position at Yeshiva University High Schools of Los Angeles (YULA). Dunner moved with his family to the Pico-Robertson district of Los Angeles, where his home became a magnet for teenagers and young adults eager to enhance their Jewish experience.

In March 2013, the American Israel Public Affairs Committee (AIPAC) honored Rabbi Dunner for his pro-Israel advocacy by presenting him with the 'Ally of the Year' award, describing him as 'a shining example of what a campus professional can mean to an entire school." In their press release, AIPAC stated: "[Rabbi Dunner's] profound contribution to the creation of an environment on campus where students are excited to be involved in pro-Israel political activism has led activists at YULA to be some of the most productive in the country."

After two years at YULA, Dunner was appointed senior rabbi at Young Israel of North Beverly Hills, also known as Beverly Hills Synagogue, a modern Orthodox Jewish community in the heart of Beverly Hills, where he and his family now reside.

On June 12, 2019, Dunner was presented with the Algemeiner Honoree Award at the inaugural West Coast Algemeiner Gala.

On June 17, 2021, Dunner was presented with the YINBH Hechaver Award for exemplary leadership of his community during the COVID-19 pandemic, at the annual Beverly Hills Synagogue Gala Banquet.

On June 8, 2022, Dunner, along with Dennis Prager, an American talk-show host, debated at the Saban Theatre, Beverly Hills, about the inherence of good moral character and goodness in humans.

== Agunot ==
In 1999, Dunner launched a public campaign against the phenomenon of Jewish husbands refusing to give their wives a Jewish document of divorce, known as a "Get", thereby preventing them from remarrying within the Jewish community, a status referred to as "Agunah".

== Collaboration with President Isaac Herzog ==
In 2020, Dunner collaborated with President Isaac Herzog of Israel on the republication of a book originally published in 1927 by President Herzog's great-grandfather, Rabbi Shmuel Yitzchok Hillman (1868–1953). The book contains Rabbi Hillman's sermons on the book of Genesis, as well as several eulogies for notables who had died in the early years of the twentieth century.

In addition to the original content, the republication also included a 130-page biographical monograph on Rabbi Hillman's life and career, revealing details not previously known about the rabbi. The book also included extensive footnotes on the sermons and eulogies, with citations and explanations of Rabbi Hillman's work.

On June 23, 2024, Dunner, along with a delegation from Beverly Hills, met at President Herzog's official residence in Jerusalem to launch another republication of Rabbi Hillman's work, Ohr Hayashar on tractate Shabbat. Originally published in 1941 as part of a book on four tractates, Dunner expanded the 32 pages by Rabbi Hillman on tractate Shabbat into a volume of over 500 pages, fully annotated with explanations of each of Rabbi Hillman's comments on the text. President Herzog welcomed the new book, calling it an "amazing achievement" and a "tribute to my great-grandfather's legacy."

The collaboration between Dunner and President Herzog has made a unique and valuable contribution to the world of Jewish scholarship, providing new insights into the life and work of one of the great rabbis of the early twentieth century. "Watch interview with Dunner and President Herzog about the republication of Rabbi Hillman's book". YouTube.

== Paradise Cove ==
Dunner edited and annotated Paradise Cove: They Escaped the Cuckoo's Nest, a memoir written under the name George T. Nagel by Rabbi Yechezkel Taub, the third Yabloner Rebbe. The book describes Taub's volunteer work at a psychiatric facility in Southern California during the 1970s. Dunner added contextual and biographical footnotes, and the book was published by Manhattan Book Group in January 2026.

In June 2026, Paradise Cove was named a finalist in the Memoirs (Historical/Legacy) category of the Next Generation Indie Book Awards. In September 2026, Paradise Cove: They Escaped the Cuckoo's Nest won the NYC Big Book Award in the Psychiatry/Psychology category.

== Campaign against Qatari Royals ==
In April 2025, Dunner visited London to protest with other Pro-Israel campaigners outside of Claridge's to target Sheikh Hamad for funding Hamas.

== Publications ==
As Author

- Mavericks, Mystics & False Messiahs: Episodes from the Margins of Jewish History (Koren, 2018) ISBN 978-1592645107
- Hearts & Minds: An Original Look at Each Parsha in the Torah (Otzrot, 2021) ISBN 978-1736189009
- Rebel Rabbi of London: The Epic Battle Against Joseph Shapotshnick (100 numbered copies, Otzrot, 2021)
- Hearts & Minds II: An Original Look at Jewish Festivals & Significant Jewish Dates (Otzrot, 2023) ISBN 978-1736189016

As Editor

Nagel, George T. Paradise Cove: They Escaped the Cuckoo's Nest. Edited and annotated by Pini Dunner. Manhattan Book Group, 2026. ISBN 978-1968485511.
