= Walter Söhne =

German agronomist (1913–2011)

Walter Söhne (7 October 1913 – 24 December 2011) was a pioneer in research on soil mechanics (terramechanics) and on improving the design of agricultural vehicles (tractors etc.), and was a very successful teacher as a professor from 1965 to 1982 at the Technical University of Munich. He wrote many articles in German on related topics, and his Über die Historie der Bodenbearbeitungs- und Erntetechnik (1992) surveys the history of techniques of agricultural cultivation and harvesting. In the 1970s he served as president of the International Society for Terrain Vehicle Systems.
