= Saatchi Synagogue =

Independent Orthodox Jewish synagogue in Maida Vale, London

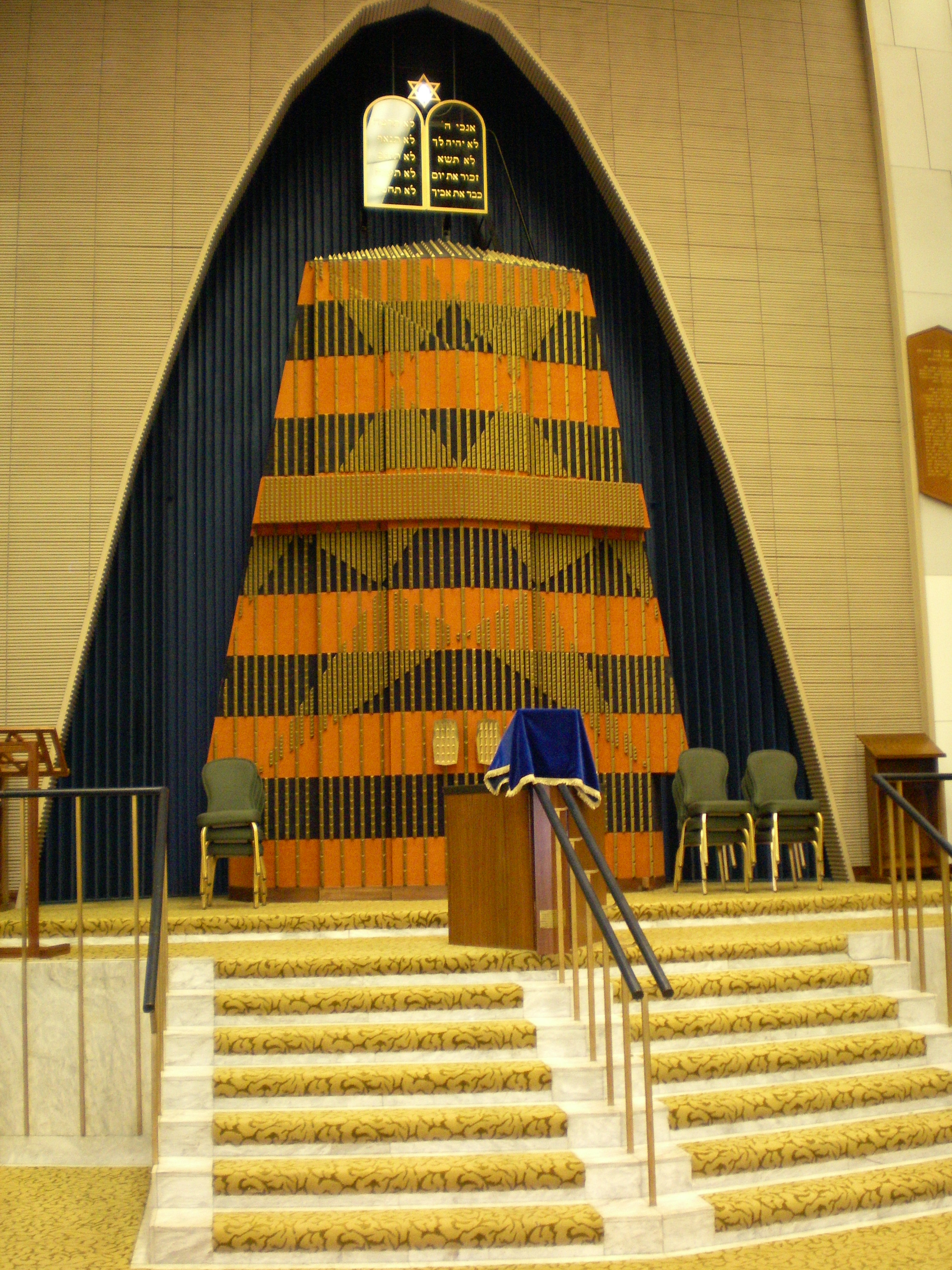
- Interior of the St John's Wood synagogue, the meeting place for the Saatchi Synagogue congregation

- Location of the synagogue in the City of Westminster

Religion
- Affiliation: Orthodox Judaism
- Rite: Nusach Ashkenaz
- Ecclesiastical or organizational status: Synagogue
- Leadership: Rabbi Mendel Cohen
- Status: Active

Location
- Location: 7/41 Grove End Road, City of Westminster, Central London, England NW89NG
- Country: United Kingdom
- Interactive map of Saatchi Synagogue
- Coordinates: 51°32′01″N 0°11′11″W

Architecture
- Founder: Charles Saatchi and; Maurice Saatchi
- Established: 1998 (as a congregation)

Website
- saatchishul.org

The Saatchi Synagogue, also called The Saatchi Shul, is an Orthodox Jewish congregation that worships from a synagogue located at 7/41 Grove End Road, in the City of Westminster, England. The congregation worships in the Ashkenazi rite.

== History ==
The congregation was founded in 1998 in Maida Vale, London by Charles Saatchi and Maurice Saatchi. The first rabbi of the congregation was Pinchas "Pini" Eliezer Dunner.

Initially meeting at Andover Place, in Maida Vale, in a part of the building that once formed the Bayswater Synagogue, the congregation subsequently moved its services to the site of the St John's Wood (United) Synagogue, and in 2018 plans were made to merge the two congregations.

Rabbi Mendel Cohen has been the rabbinical leader of the congregation since 2010.

== See also ==
- History of the Jews in England
- List of Jewish communities in the United Kingdom
- List of synagogues in the United Kingdom
