= Hans Heinz Holz =

German philosopher (1927–2011)

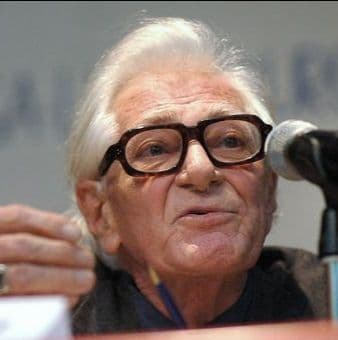
Hans Heinz Holz

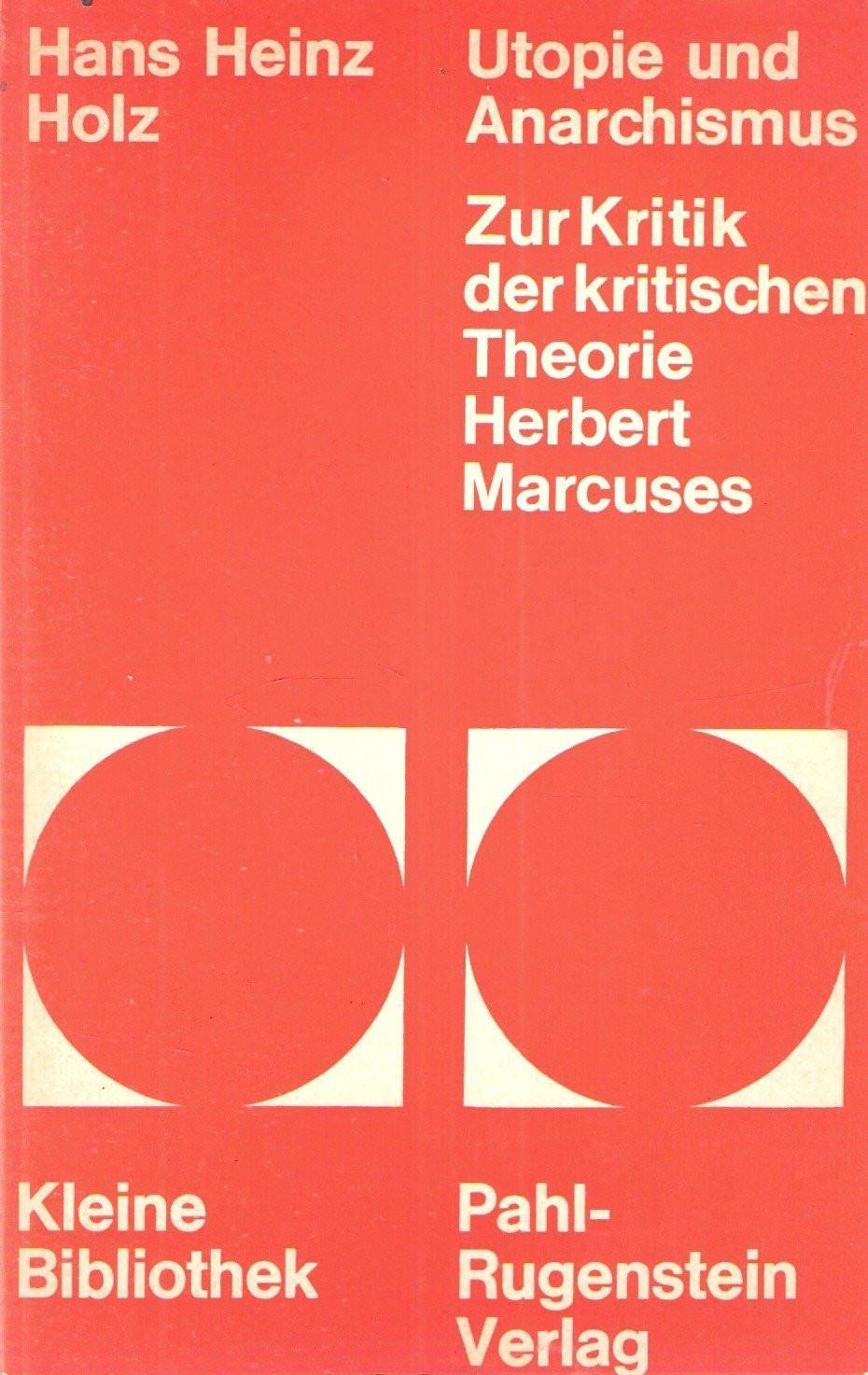
Utopie und Anarchismus, 1968

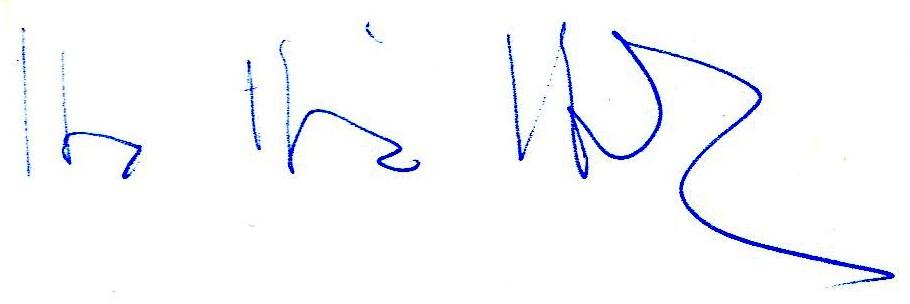
Hans Heinz Holz autograph, 1987

Hans Heinz Holz (26 February 1927 – 11 December 2011) was a German Marxist philosopher.

Born in Frankfurt am Main, he was professor of philosophy at the University of Marburg (from 1971 to 1979) and from 1979 to 1993 at the University of Groningen. He is known for his encyclopedic knowledge of the history of philosophy on one hand and for his openly expressed ideological viewpoints on the other. Influenced by Gottfried Wilhelm Leibniz's monadology, he regards Widerspiegelung (reflection) not only as an epistemological but also as an ontological category. Some critics spot here a hazard of deviating from materialism. Though Holz saw himself as in footsteps of Lenin, his vision is disputed among the leftist circles. He has contributed to far-left publications like Marxistische Blätter and Weißenseer Blätter. He joined the German Communist Party in 1994.

== Works ==
- Jean-Paul Sartre. Darstellung und Kritik seiner Philosophie, Meisenheim: Westkulturverlag, 1951
- Sprache und Welt. Probleme der Sprachphilosophie, Frankfurt: Schulte-Bulmke, 1953
- Leibniz, Stuttgart: Kohlhammer, 1958
- Der französische Existenzialismus, Speyer / Munich: Dobbeck, 1958
- Macht und Ohnmacht der Sprache. Untersuchungen zum Sprachverständnis und Stil Heinrich von Kleists, Frankfurt: Athenäum, 1962 (Bielefeld: Aisthesis, 2011)
- With Paul Neuhöffer: Griff nach der Diktatur? Texte, Kommentare, Stellungnahmen zur geplanten Notstandsgesetzgebung, Cologne: Pahl-Rugenstein, 1965
- Utopie und Anarchismus. Zur kritischen Theorie Herbert Marcuses, Cologne: Pahl-Rugenstein, 1968
- Widerspruch in China. Politisch-philosophische Erläuterungen zu Mao Tse-tung, Munich: Hanser, 1970
- Vom Kunstwerk zur Ware. Studien zur Funktion des ästhetischen Gegenstands im Spätkapitalismus, Neuwied / Berlin: Luchterhand, 1972
- Strömungen und Tendenzen im Neomarxismus, München: Carl Hanser Verlag, 1972 (Dutch edition: Tendensen in het europese marxisme: Het polycentrisme en de dialektiek van theorie en praktijk, Nijmegen: Socialistiese Uitgeverij, 1975)
- Dialektik und Widerspiegelung, Cologne: Pahl Rugenstein, 1983
- Dialectische constructie van de totaliteit, Groningen: Uitgeverij Konstapel, 1983 (co-authors Jeroen Bartels, Detlev Pätzold and Jos Lensink)
- Dialectiek als open systeem, Groningen: Uitgeverij Konstapel, 1985 (co-authors Jeroen Bartels, Detlev Pätzold and Jos Lensink)
- De actualiteit van de metafysica, Kampen: Kok-Agora, 1991
- Niederlage und Zukunft des Sozialismus, Essen: Neue Impulse Verlag, 1991
- Gottfried Wilhelm Leibniz. Eine Einführung, Frankfurt/M. / New York: Campus, 1992
- Philosophische Theorie der bildenden Künste
  - Band I, Der ästhetische Gegenstand. Die Präsenz des Wirklichen, Bielefeld: Aiesthesis Verlag, 1996
  - Band II, Strukturen der Darstellung. Über Konstanten der ästhetischen Konfigurationen, Bielefeld: Aisthesis Verlag, 1997
  - Band III, Der Zerfall der Bedeutungen. Zur Funktion des ästhetischen Gegenstandes im Spätkapitalismus, Bielefeld: Aiesthesis Verlag, 1997
- Einheit und Widerspruch. Problemgeschichte der Dialektik in der Neuzeit
  - Band I: Die Signatur der Neuzeit, Stuttgart/Weimar: J. B. Metzler, 1997
  - Band II: Pluralität und Einheit, Stuttgart/Weimar: J. B. Metzler, 1997
  - Band III: Die Ausarbeitung der Dialektik, Stuttgart/Weimar: J. B. Metzler, 1997
- Gesammelte Aufsätze aus 50 Jahren
  - Band I: Der Kampf um Demokratie und Frieden, Essen: Neue Impulse Verlag, 2003
  - Band II: Deutsche Ideologie nach 1945, Essen: Neue Impulse Verlag, 2003
- Weltentwurf und Reflexion. Versuch einer Grundlegung der Dialektik. Stuttgart/Weimar: J. B. Metzler, 2005
