= 2016 in Germany =

- Decades: 1990s; 2000s; 2010s; 2020s; 2030s
- See also: Other events of 2016; History of Germany • Timeline • Years

This list details notable events that occurred in 2016 in Germany.

== Incumbents ==
- President: Joachim Gauck
- Chancellor: Angela Merkel

== Events ==
=== January ===
- 1 January – New Year's Eve sexual assaults in Germany
- 30–31 January - 2016 FIL World Luge Championships in Königssee

=== February ===
- 9 February - Bad Aibling rail accident
- 3–7 February - 2016 German Masters
- 11–21 February - 66th Berlin International Film Festival
- 25 February: Germany in the Eurovision Song Contest 2016

=== March ===
- CeBIT in Hanover
- ITB Berlin in Berlin
- Leipzig Book Fair in Leipzig
- Germany in the Eurovision Song Contest 2016
- 13 March: Baden-Württemberg state election, 2016
- 13 March: Rhineland-Palatinate state election, 2016
- 13 March: Saxony-Anhalt state election, 2016
- Böhmermann affair

=== April ===
- Hanover Messe in Hanover
- Deutscher Filmpreis in Berlin

=== May ===
- 10 May: Munich knife attack
- 13 May: Killing of Niklas Pöhler

=== June ===
- Kiel Week in Kiel
- 2016 Düsseldorf terrorism plot
- 9-12: 2016 Bilderberg Conference in Dresden

=== July ===
- 14–17 July - 2016 Extreme Sailing Series in Hamburg
- 18 July: 2016 Würzburg train attack
- 22 July: 2016 Munich shooting
- 24 July: 2016 Ansbach bombing, 2016 Reutlingen machete attack

=== August ===
- Hanse Sail in Rostock
- Internationale Funkausstellung Berlin in Berlin

=== September ===
- ILA Berlin Air Show in Berlin
- Gamescom in Cologne
- Frankfurt Motor Show in Frankfurt
- September - October – Oktoberfest in Munich
- 1 September: in the Germany state of Thuringia. Alternative für Deutschland (AfD) politician Wiebke Muhsal wears a Niqab to the Thuringian Landtag (state parliament) in a protest calling for a ban on the face covering.
- 4 September: Mecklenburg-Vorpommern state election, 2016
  - The Alternative for Germany (AfD), which was previously unrepresented in Mecklenburg-Vorpommern gains its first state seats.
  - The far-right National Democratic Party of Germany (NPD) loses its last state representation.
- 18 September: Berlin state election, 2016
- 28 September: Following a civil trial in Frankfurt, Claudia Dinkel is ordered to pay compensation to journalist and weather presenter Jörg Kachelmann for her false rape accusations against him in 2010. The court found Dinkel guilty of indirect deprivation of liberty through a knowingly untrue criminal complaint, establishing that her injuries had been self inflicted.

=== October ===
- 8 October: 2016 Chemnitz terrorism plot
- Frankfurt Book Fair

November

- 27 November: Nico Rosberg wins the Championship against his teammate Lewis Hamilton, in Abu Dhabi. A week later, Rosberg announces his retirement, allowing Valtteri Bottas to take his seat for next year.

=== December ===
- 19 December: 2016 Berlin truck attack

== Deaths ==
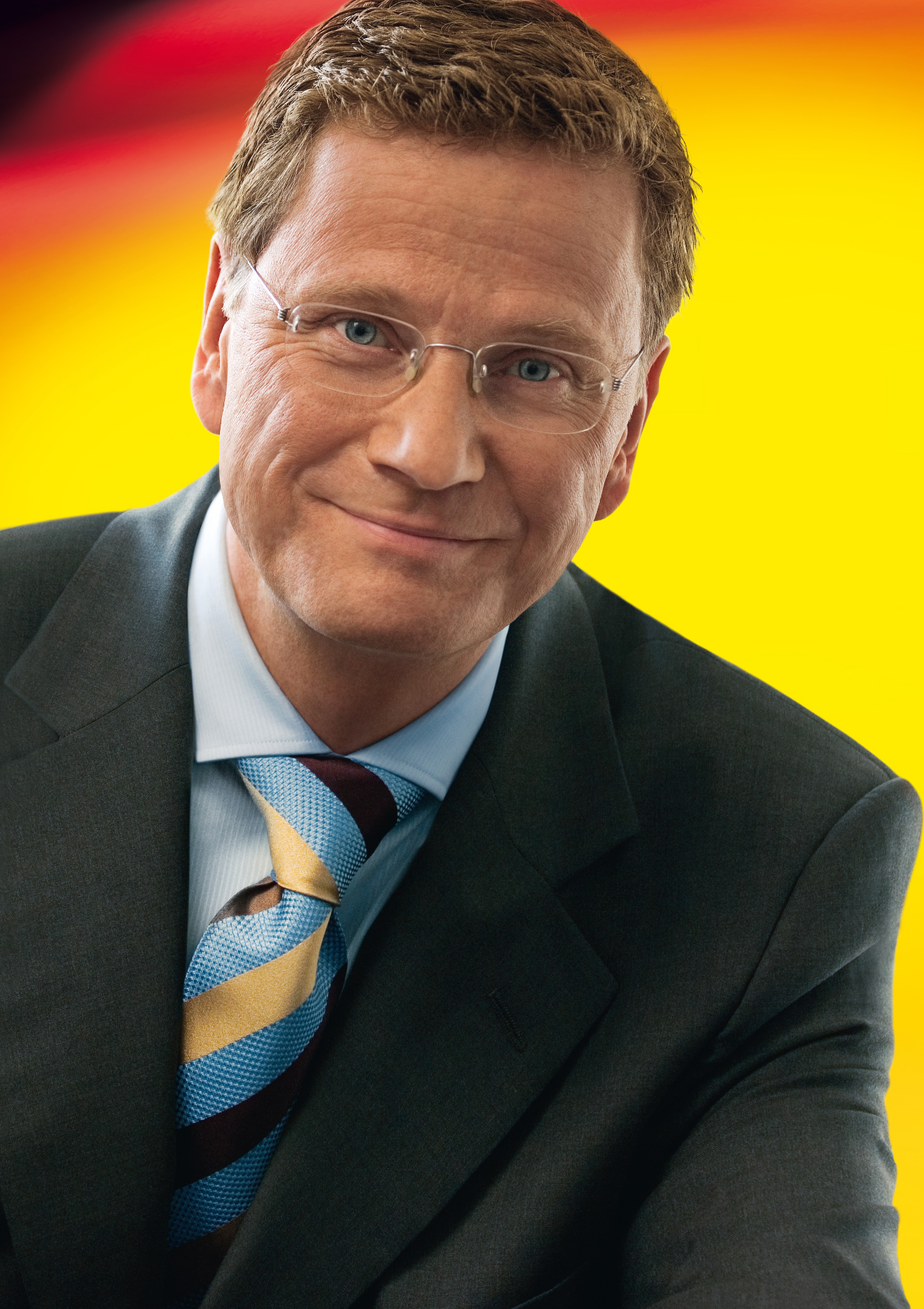
Guido Westerwelle

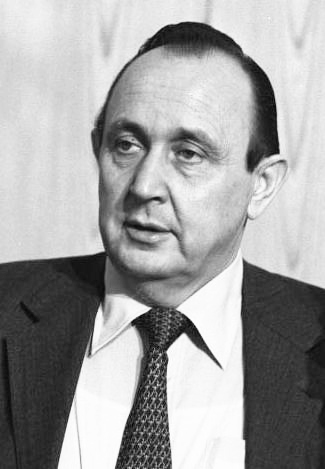
Hans-Dietrich Genscher

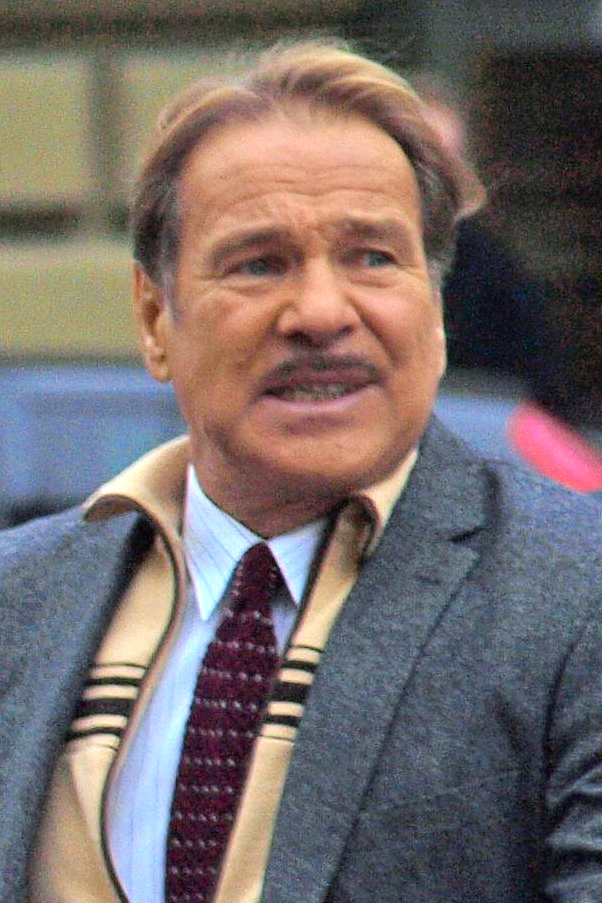
Götz George

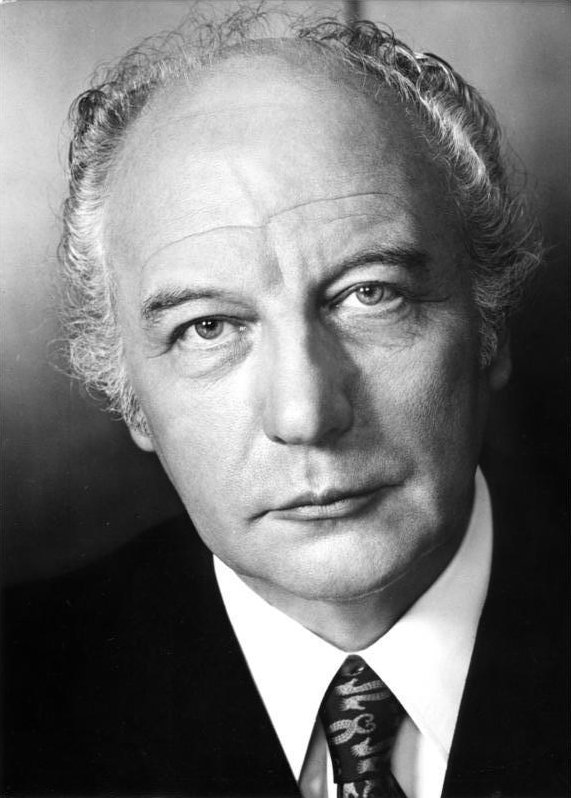
Walter Scheel

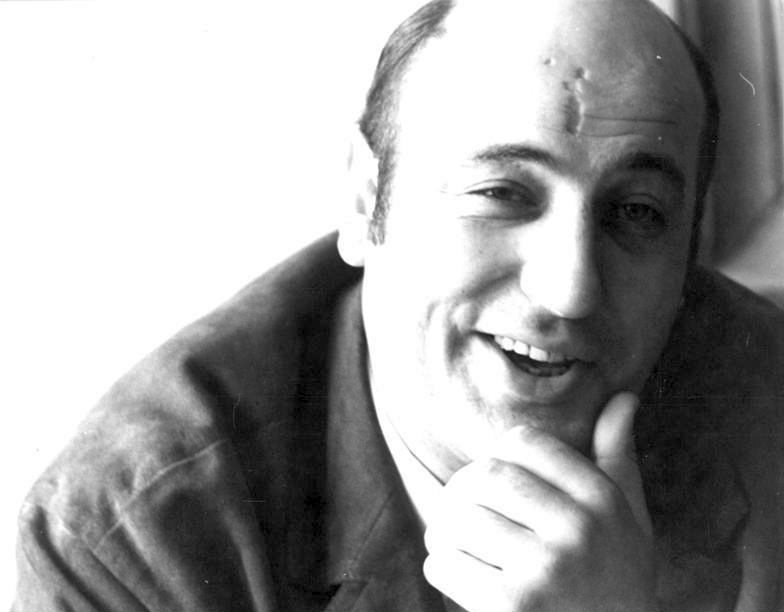
Manfred Krug, 1971

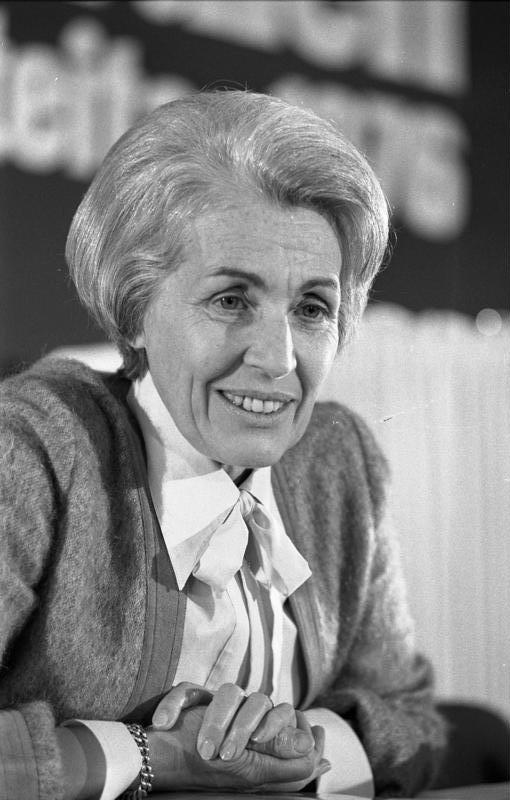
Hildegard Hamm-Brücher in 1976

- 1 January: Helmut Koester, American-German scholar of the New Testament (born 1926)
- 4 January:
  - Maja Maranow, German actress (born 1961)
  - Achim Mentzel, German actor (born 1946)
- 9 January: Robert Naegele, German actor (born 1925)
- 10 January: Ulrich Hahnen, German politician (born 1952)
- 12 January: Ruth Leuwerik, German actress (born 1924)
- 27 January: Artur Fischer, German inventor (born 1919)
- 31 January: Wolfgang Rademann, German television producer (born 1934)
- 7 February: Roger Willemsen, German author, essayist and TV presenter (born 1955)
- 23 February: Peter Lustig, German television presenter and author of children's books (born 1937)
- 26 February: Karl Dedecius, Polish-born German translator of Polish and Russian literature (born 1921)
- 29 February: Hannes Löhr, German football player (born 1942)
- 18 March: Guido Westerwelle, German politician (born 1961)
- 24 March: Roger Cicero, German jazz and pop musician (born 1970)
- 31 March: Hans-Dietrich Genscher, German politician (born 1927)
- 7 April: Hendrikje Fitz, German actress (born 1961)
- 18 April: Fritz Herkenrath, German football goalkeeper (born 1928)
- 19 April: Karl-Heinz von Hassel, German actor (born 1939)
- 21 April: Hans Koschnick, German politician (born 1929)
- 24 April: Klaus Siebert, German biathlete (born 1955)
- 28 April: Georg Kronawitter, German politician (born 1928)
- 30 April: Uwe Friedrichsen, German actor (born 1934)
- 6 May: Margot Honecker, German politician (born 1927)
- 6 May: Klaus Ampler, German cyclist (born 1940)
- 9 May: Walther Leisler Kiep, German politician (born 1926)
- 11 May: Peter Behrens, German musician (born 1947)
- 15 May: Erika Berger, German television moderator (born 1939)
- 18 May: Fritz Stern, German-American historian (born 1926)
- 31 May: Rupert Neudeck, German journalist (born 1939)
- 11 June: Rudi Altig, German cyclist (born 1937)
- 19 June: Götz George, German actor (born 1938)
- 7 July: Wolfram Siebeck, German author and journalist (born 1928)
- 12 July: Miriam Pielhau, German actress and author (born 1975)
- 14 August: Hermann Kant, German author (born 1926)
- 24 August: Walter Scheel, German politician, former president (born 1919)
- 24 August: Henning Voscherau, German politician (born 1941)
- 10 September: Jutta Limbach, German politician and jurist (born 1934)
- 14 September: Hilmar Thate, German actor (born 1931)
- 10 October: Tamme Hanken, German horse whisperer and animals bonesetter (born 1960)
- 21 October : Manfred Krug, German actor (born 1937)
- 24 October : Reinhard Häfner, German footballer (born 1952)
- 26 November : Peter Hintze, German politician (born 1950)
- 2 December : Gisela May, German actress and singer (born 1924)
- 7 December: Hildegard Hamm-Brücher, German politician (born 1921)
- 27 December: Hans Tietmeyer, German economist (born 1931)
