= 1939 in Germany =

- Decades: 1910s; 1920s; 1930s; 1940s; 1950s
- See also: Other events of 1939; History of Germany • Timeline • Years

Events in the year 1939 in Germany.

== Incumbents ==
=== National level ===
Head of State and Chancellor

- Adolf Hitler (the Führer) (Nazi Party)

== Events ==
- 23 January – "Dutch War Scare": Admiral Wilhelm Canaris of the Abwehr leaks misinformation to the effect that Germany plans to invade the Netherlands in February, with the aim of using Dutch airfields to launch a strategic bombing offensive against Britain. The "Dutch War Scare" leads to a major change in British policies towards Europe.
- 27 January – Adolf Hitler orders Plan Z, a 5-year naval expansion programme intended to provide for a huge German fleet capable of crushing the Royal Navy by 1944. The Kriegsmarine is given the first priority on the allotment of German economic resources.

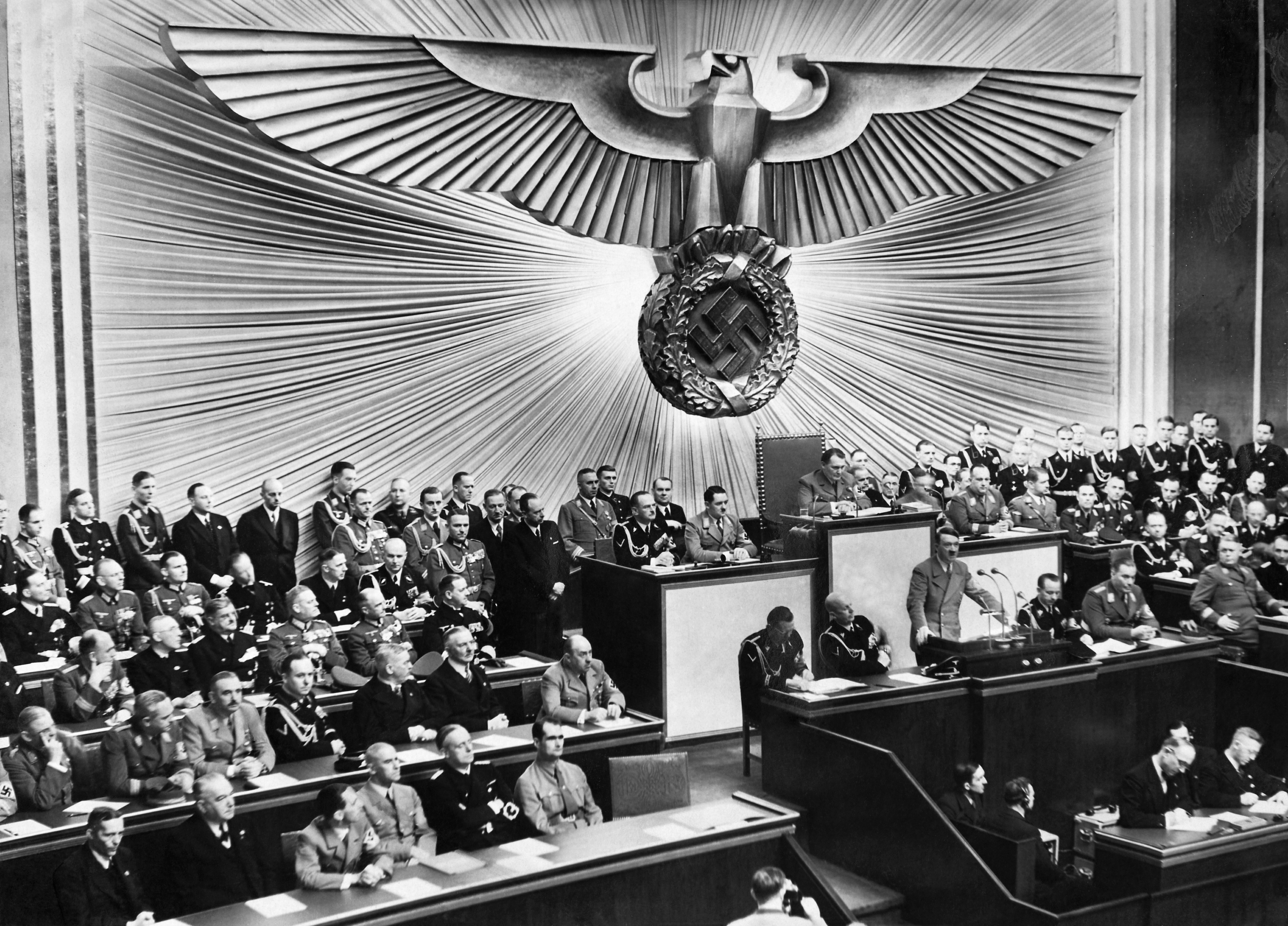
Hitler's prophecy speech in the Reichstag, 30 January 1939

- 30 January – Hitler gives a speech before the Reichstag calling for an "export battle" to increase German foreign exchange holdings. The same speech also sees Hitler's "prophecy" where he warns that if "Jewish financers" start a war against Germany, the "result will be the annihilation of the Jewish race in Europe".
- 6 February – In a response to Georges Bonnet's speech of 26 January, German Foreign Minister Joachim von Ribbentrop, referring to Bonnet's alleged statement of 6 December 1938 accepting Eastern Europe as being in Germany's exclusive sphere of influence, protests that all French security commitments in that region are "now off limits".
- 22 March – After an ultimatum of March 20, Nazi Germany takes Memelland from Lithuania.
- 25 March – German troops occupy the remaining parts of Bohemia and Moravia; Czechoslovakia ceases to exist. The Ruthenian region of Czechoslovakia declares independence as Carpatho-Ukraine.
- 3 April – Adolf Hitler orders the German military to start planning for Fall Weiss, the codename for the invasion of Poland.
- 28 April – In a speech before the Reichstag, Adolf Hitler renounces the Anglo-German Naval Agreement and the German–Polish declaration of non-aggression.
- May – Hitler agrees to a request from the father of a five-month-old boy born blind and with missing limbs for his son to be euthanised.
- 22 May – Germany and Italy sign the Pact of Steel.
- 6 July – The last remaining Jewish enterprises in Germany are closed by the Nazis.

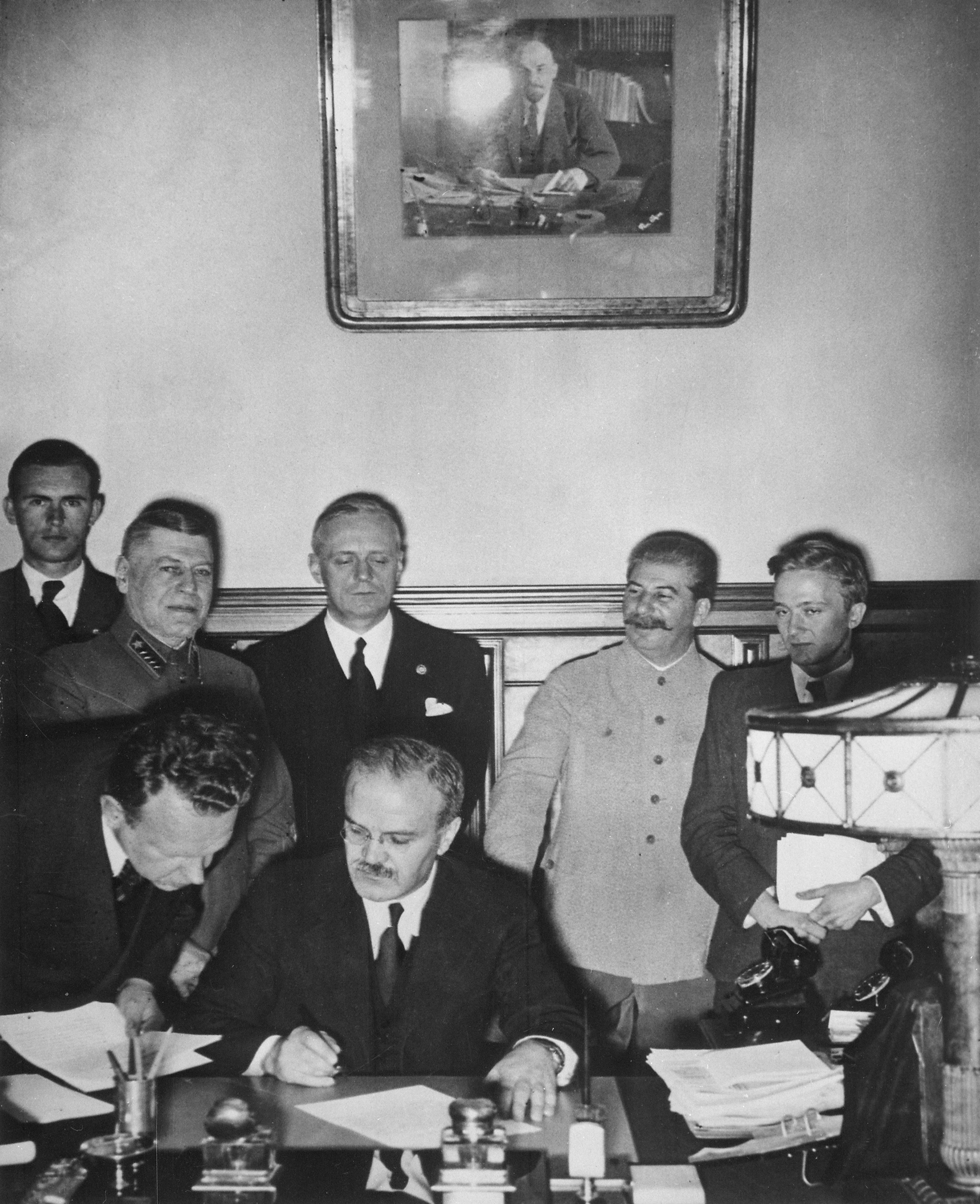
Signing of the Molotov–Ribbentrop Pact

- 23 August – Molotov–Ribbentrop Pact: Adolf Hitler and Joseph Stalin agree to divide Europe between themselves (Finland, Estonia, Latvia, eastern Poland and the north-east province of Romania (Bessarabia, today Moldova) to the USSR; Lithuania and western Poland to Germany).
- 26 August – The Kriegsmarine orders all German-flagged merchant ships to head to German ports immediately in anticipation of the invasion of Poland.
- 1 September – At 04.45 Central European Time, the German battleship Schleswig-Holstein opens bombardment on the Westerplatte, a Polish military base outside Danzig, firing what are, according to many sources, the first shots of the war. At the same time, regular Wehrmacht troops begin crossing the border into Poland, which marks the beginning of World War II.
- 2 September – Following the invasion of Poland, Danzig (now Gdańsk, Poland) is annexed to Nazi Germany.
- 3 September – The United Kingdom, France, New Zealand and Australia declare war on Germany.
- 3 September – British liner SS Athenia becomes the first civilian casualty of the war when she is torpedoed and sunk by U-30 in the eastern Atlantic. Of the 1,418 aboard, 117 are killed (98 passengers and 19 crew members).
- 4 September – Nepal declares war on Germany.
- 6 September – South Africa declares war on Germany.
- 10 September – Canada declares war on Germany.
- 15 September – Diverse elements of the German Wehrmacht surround Warsaw and demand its surrender. The Poles refuse and the siege begins in earnest.
- 28 September – Nazi Germany and the Soviet Union agree on a division of Poland after their invasion.
- 28 September – Warsaw surrenders to Germany; Modlin surrenders a day later; the last Polish large operational unit surrenders near Kock 8 days later.
- October – Action T4 programme begins, meaning that the state will now euthanise people deemed "unworthy" of life due to physical disabilities or mental illness, as keeping them alive would not be seen as good use of taxpayers money by the state or its supporters.
- 8 October – Germany annexes Western Poland.
- 14 October – The German submarine U-47 sinks the British battleship HMS Royal Oak.
- 6 November – Sonderaktion Krakau: Germans take action against scientists from the University of Kraków and other Kraków universities at the beginning of World War II.
- 9 November – Venlo Incident: Two British agents of SIS are captured by the Germans.
- 13 December – Battle of the River Plate: The German pocket battleship Admiral Graf Spee is trapped by cruisers HMS Ajax, HMNZS Achilles, and HMS Exeter after a running battle off the coast of Uruguay. Admiral Graf Spee is scuttled by its crew off Montevideo harbour on December 17.
- 29 December – Police issue a warrant for the arrest of the tycoon Fritz Thyssen who once funded but now opposes the Nazis. He is believed to be in Portugal

== Births ==
- 14 January – Helmut Lethen, German literary scholar (died 2026 in Austria)
- 15 January – Hartmut Geerken, German musician, composer, writer, journalist, playwright and filmmaker (died 2021)
- 8 February – Karl-Heinz von Hassel, German actor (died 2016)
- 13 February – Beate Klarsfeld, German-born Nazi hunter
- 21 February – Gert Neuhaus, German artist
- 21 February – Ulrich Briefs, German politician (died 2005)
- 31 March – Volker Schlöndorff, German film director
- 31 March – Karl-Heinz Schnellinger, German footballer
- 22 April – Theo Waigel, German politician
- 24 April – Ernst Zündel, German publisher and pamphleteer (died 2017)
- 28 April – Burkhard Driest, German film director and writer
- 14 May – Rupert Neudeck, German journalist (died 2016)
- 18 May – Peter Grünberg, German physicist, Nobel Prize in Physics laureate
- 23 May – Reinhard Hauff, German film director
- 24 May – Ferdinand Schladen, shot putter
- 25 May – Klaus Naumann, German general
- 26 May – Manfred Kanther, German politician
- 20 June – Elisabeth Bauriedel, German politician
- 1 July – Volker Kempe, German scientist, manager and entrepreneur
- 13 August – Erika Berger, German television presenter and author (died 2016)
- 4 September – Erwin Teufel, German politician
- 7 September – Christine Bergmann, German politician
- 8 September – Carsten Keller, German field hockey player
- 17 September – Günther Fielmann, German entrepreneur
- 24 September – Dieter Schwarz, German entrepreneur
- 25 September – Harald Ringstorff, German politician
- 5 October – A. R. Penck, German painter and jazz drummer (died 2017 in Switzerland)
- 13 October – Eike Wilm Schulte, German opera singer (died 2025)
- 17 October – Reiner Goldberg, German opera singer (died 2023)
- 8 November – Erich Kellerhals, German businessman (died 2017)
- 9 November – Björn Engholm, German politician
- 6 December – Klaus Balkenhol, German equestrian

== Deaths ==
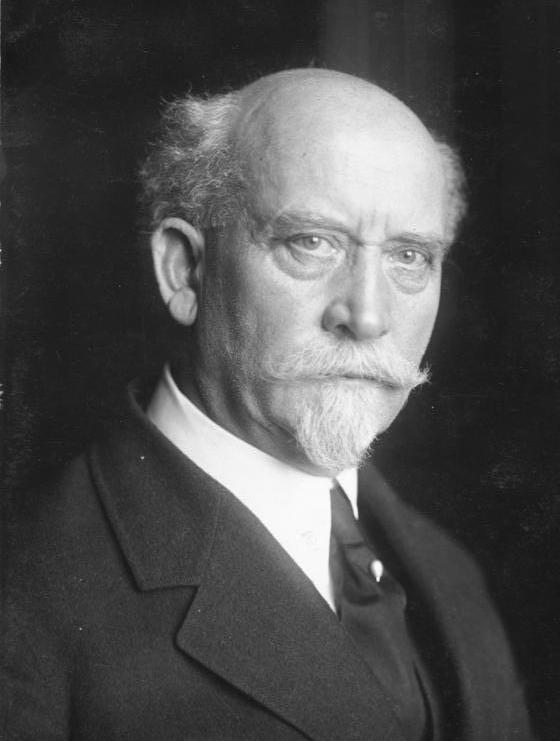
Philipp Scheidemann

- 4 March – Oswald Freisler, German lawyer (suicide) (born 1895)
- 3 May – Wilhelm Groener, German soldier and chief of German General staff (born 1867)
- 22 May – Ernst Toller, German playwright (born 1893)
- 11 August – Jean Bugatti, German automobile designer (born 1909)
- 31 August – Wilhelm Bölsche, German journalist and science writer (born 1861)
- 16 September
  - Ludwig R. Conradi, German evangelist, missionary (born 1856)
  - Otto Wels, German politician (born 1873)
- 17 September – Otto Röhm, German entrepreneur (born 1876)
- 24 September – Carl Laemmle, German film producer (born 1867)
- 29 November – Philipp Scheidemann, Chancellor of Germany (born 1865)
- 31 December – Georg Wertheim, German entrepreneur (born 1857)
- Full date unknown – Otto Berg, chemist (born 1873)
