= 2016 German terror plot =

ISIL terror plot in Germany

The 2016 German terror plot was a plot by ISIL to commit a terror attack in Germany in 2016. Three teams of attackers planned travel to Germany, to prepare and execute a large-scale attack on a music festival, the name of which hasn't been published yet. The plot was made public only in October 2018, when NDR, WDR and Süddeutsche Zeitung led an interview with a German ISIL supporter. Bundeskriminalamt and Bundesanwaltschaft (Federal Prosecutor's Office) led the investigations. The German Public Prosecutor General, Peter Frank, confirmed the plot, saying: "For us, the facts in this case were very concrete and resilient."

== Incidents ==
The Hildesheim ISIL supporter Oguz G. and his Salzgitter wife Marcia M., who emigrated to Syria in support of ISIL in 2015, played a central role. When Kurdish units conquered the then ISIL capital Rakka in October 2017, the two turned to the Kurdish authorities, which detained them in the Kurdish-controlled areas of Syria. Marcia M. had been trying to recruit potential supporters from Syria and to persuade female Islamists in northern Germany via the internet to marry ISIL fighters as a camouflage for the operation, became an informant of the Office for the Protection of the Constitution. The recruited women were to have invited the fighters to Germany so that they could commit the planned attacks there. The orders for the attacks was traced back to a senior ISIL official with the fighting name Abu Mussab al-Almani alias the Swiss Thomas C., who is said to have been killed fighting in Syria.

The plan ultimately failed due to investigators' prior knowledge of attack and because of disintegration of the ISIL militia in Syria.

== Legal proceedings ==
Arrest warrants against Oguz G. and Marcia M. had been released; He is waiting for his extradition to Germany.

Marcia M. was sentenced to eight years and six months imprisonment in 2023 by the higher regional court of Celle.

== See also ==
- 2016 Ansbach bombing
- 2016 Chemnitz terrorism plot
- 2016 Düsseldorf terrorism plot
- 2016 Ludwigshafen bombing plot
- Democratic Federation of Northern Syria
- Rock am Ring and Rock im Park#2017 festival
- Islamic terrorism in Europe
