= Amandine Le Coz =

French Muslim who joined ISIL in 2014, later sentenced

- Born: July 9, 1990 (age 36); Domont, France
- Other names: Sakina, Umm Noor
- Occupations: model, professional caregiver, housewife
- Known for: travel to Syria and marriage to ISIL members, repatriation to France and conviction for terrorism
- Criminal charges: criminal association with a view to preparing terrorist acts
- Criminal penalty: 10 years in prison
- Criminal status: incarcerated
- Spouse(s): Yacine Rettoun (married and divorced, 2014) Haroune Belfilali (2016–present)
- Children: 1 son (born March 2017)

Amandine Le Coz (born July 9, 1990) is a French convert to Islam who, in 2014, left her home in France and traveled to Syria to join the Islamic State of Iraq and the Levant (ISIL). In 2019, she and her toddler son were repatriated to France after spending a year and a half in a Kurdish detention camp. In 2023, Le Coz was sentenced to ten years in prison for joining ISIL.

She was one of forty women married to ISIL jihadists who were tried and convicted of terror-related offenses in France. Le Coz was one of the first returnees from the Syrian civil war to be tried for her involvement in terrorism. Her ten-year sentence for criminal association with a view to preparing terrorist acts was slightly less than the eleven-year term the prosecution requested, and one-third of the maximum thirty-year sentence.

== Early life and education ==
Le Coz is originally from Domont in Val-d'Oise. She had dyslexia, and was later tested and determined to function at a low intellectual level with "significant psycho-affective immaturity", as well as a histrionic personality. She was the youngest of several children, and her father was an atheist while her mother had been raised a Christian. Le Coz was placed in special education after primary school. In sixth grade, through a friend, she discovered Islam and found it "magnificent" but did not convert at that time.

She attended a vocational high school and got a CAP (vocational certificate) in home care. She got a job as a caregiver in a retirement home, but lost it after a few weeks because a driver's license was necessary and she had failed her driving test five times. Le Coz then went to work at a McDonald's near her parents' home and did lingerie photoshoots to build a portfolio as a model.

== Conversion to Islam ==
Le Coz was also consuming alcohol and drugs and said that she imitated her friends' behavior "to be normal, like them." She visited Tunisia in 2010 and went to a "beautiful" mosque there. In 2013, she thought she had overdosed and felt her survival was a miracle. Her near-death experience plus her trip to the Tunisian mosque convinced her to convert to Islam. She formally converted at a mosque in Garges-lès-Gonesse. Afterwards she began wearing the niqab, but only when away from her family, and she prayed in secret.

When Le Coz's brother found a photo of her on Twitter wearing the niqab, and her parents found religious items hidden in her room, they wouldn't accept her conversion and she left their home. She was 23 years old at the time. Her father later said the family was “afraid” of the Muslim religion.

Le Coz was sofa surfing with relatives and strangers whom she met on social media and later said she felt a "hatred" growing inside her while she was homeless. She would later say she was looking for a "surrogate family" during this time period and "did not hate France" but was upset about her "violent rejection" from her family.

== ISIL recuitment and marriages ==
A Muslim friend of hers who temporarily housed Le Coz said she prayed, spent a lot of time on social media and was always veiled during this period after leaving her family’s home, and that she spoke of “unbelievers.” After her disappearance from France, ISIL propaganda was found on her computer, including photos of Le Coz herself raising one finger, an ISIL sign for unity. In June 2014, Le Coz had an online conversation with a man who called himself "Abu Merguez" who lived in Syria and was a jihadist recruiter. He told her that as a Muslim she risked the "flames of Jahannam" if she remained in a "country of infidels" and urged her to join ISIL. Le Coz later said that at the time she had no idea ISIL was a terrorist organization. She intended to get married and began looking for a husband online. Another woman put Le Coz in contact with Yacine Rettoun, a French Moroccan ISIL fighter, who promised her "a dream life" including a house with a swimming pool. They got married online, through an app.

Rettoun’s siblings back in Loiret, France were also jihadist. He was the first among them to leave for Syria, at age 21 in April 2014, and his brother followed him in June 2014. Their father, who denied having been radicalized himself, covered up his sons’ disappearances, which were not discovered until a third child in the family, the brothers’ fifteen-year-old sister, was flagged as having possibly been radicalized. Rettoun was also a close associate of Boubaker el Hakim, who planned attacks committed abroad.

Le Coz left France to join her husband in Raqqa, the capital of ISIL's recently declared caliphate in Syria, assisted by Rettoun's family. She arrived in Syria in mid-September 2014, by which time she was 24 years old. She adopted the nommes de guerre Sakina and Umm Nour.

Le Coz later admitted she had wanted to die "as a martyr" and had considered "blowing herself up", specifically at the Paris gay pride parade. After moving to Syria, she became active on social media and rejoiced about terrorist attacks that took place in France in 2015. She posted photos of herself posing with a Kalashnikov and other niqab-wearing women, and one photo of her husband, smiling, clad in an explosive belt. She also tried to convince a woman and a minor girl to come to Syria and join ISIL. During the same time period she was putting the woman in touch with a jihadist fighter, Le Coz later claimed, she had seen a head displayed on a spike and asked Rettoun to return to France.

Rettoun was abusive, and kept Le Coz locked in their various homes and beat her. After six months, due the violence Le Coz had endured, a Syrian judge granted the couple's divorce. She said she witnessed atrocities regularly under the ISIL caliphate, as well as public display of human remains, and had to be hospitalized in 2016 after a bombing.

Le Coz's lawyer said she was forced to marry her second husband, another French Algerian ISIL fighter named Haroune Belfilali, after her divorce from Rettoun. Belfilali was born in Mantes-la-Jolie, France in 1994 and left for Syria in 2013. He was suspected of having been part of a battalion of snipers under ISIL. In March 2017, their son was born in Syria.

Since the summer of 2017, Rettoun has been presumed dead. In May 2018, Le Coz, Belfilali, and their son surrendered to Kurdish forces. Le Coz and her son were confined first in the Al-Roj refugee camp, where they were expelled for participating in a rebellion, then in a Kurdish prison, then in a Kurdish camp in Ain Issa, Syria. French authorities offered to repatriate Le Coz's son without his mother. Le Coz refused and said, "If he leaves, I'll leave with him."

== After defeat of ISIL ==
In 2019, ISIL was defeated at its territorial last stand at Baghuz. Le Coz was part of a mass escape from Ain Issa with eight hundred others when Turkey launched its military offensive in the region. Le Coz's lawyer later said the Turkish bombings had "forced" her to leave the camp with her son in fear of their own safety. Le Coz, two other ISIL-affiliated French women, and the three women's five children surrendered to the Turkish Army at the Turkish/Syrian border, and Turkey arranged for the women's repatriation to France.

If they had remained in the camp in Syria, they would not have been repatriated, as French citizens detained in Syrian camps are left to face Syrian justice. Under the "Cazeneuve protocol", French ISIL members who are found in Turkey are expelled from that country and repatriated to France to face trial. A lawyer representing the repatriated women's families said they had "long wanted to return to France to face the consequences of their actions."

Le Coz was repatriated to France in December 2019 with three other French wives of jihadists, including Sahra Ali Mehenni and Tooba Gondal, and the women's seven children. As per the Cazeneuve protocol, on arrival the children were taken into the care of child protective services, and the women were taken into custody. While in foster care, Le Coz’s toddler son exhibited behaviors suggesting he’d been exposed to extreme violence; he shouted at and threatened his stuffed animals. Two years later, despite having been given support from psychologists, the boy was noted as being still deeply traumatized.

Le Coz was one of the first French citizens returned to France under the Cazeneuve protocol. She was ultimately detained in the radicalization prevention unit in Ille-et-Vilaine in Rennes. In 2023, her parents said she had made considerable improvements there and she was getting a vocational diploma in cosmetology with plans to become a makeup artist.

In March 2023, Le Coz she put on trial for joining ISIL. During her trial she said she had wanted to leave from the very beginning of her stay in ISIL territory, but the prosecutor characterized her as "a very proactive woman" and argued she must have had multiple opportunities to leave between her arrival in 2014 and her surrender to the Kurds in 2018. When asked about the two people she had tried to convince to come to Syria, Le Coz sobbed and said she was "ashamed" and that they could have been "beaten, raped, killed" because of her.

Le Coz was convicted of criminal association with a view to preparing terrorist acts and sentenced to ten years in prison, with a two-thirds minimum term and seven years of post-release supervision. She asked to be allowed to remain at the radicalization prevention unit in Rennes, where she said she was "learning to think for herself".

As of March 2023, Le Coz’s son was still in foster care, and she hopes to regain custody of him. As of 2024, Le Coz’s husband and the child’s father, Belfilali, has not been repatriated. A lawyer representing Belfilali’s mother and the mothers of three other French Islamists filed a petition with the United Nations Committee Against Torture asking them to pressure France to repatriate Belfilali and the other French men from the prisons in Syria and Iraq where they are being held.

== See also ==
- Khadijah Dare
- Nora el-Bahty
- Yusra Hussien and Samya Dirie
- Aqsa Mahmood
- Samantha Sally
