= Tooba Gondal =

French-born ISIL propagandist and recruiter

- Born: January 6, 1994 (age 32); Paris, France
- Other name: Umm Muthanna al-Britannia
- Education: Goldsmiths, University of London
- Known for: Islamic State propagandist and recruiter
- Criminal charges: Glorification of terrorist acts; Possession and handling of weapons of war
- Criminal penalty: 10 years in prison
- Criminal status: Incarcerated
- Children: 2

Tooba Bashir Gondal (born January 6, 1994) is a French woman who joined the Islamic State of Iraq and the Levant (ISIL), became a propagandist for them, and recruited other women and girls to come to Syria and join ISIL. After the fall of the ISIL caliphate in early 2019, Gondal was placed in a detention center which she later escaped from. She was arrested by Turkish authorities in November of that year and in December, she was deported to France to face charges for terrorism. She was sentenced to ten years in prison in December 2023. Gondal is the subject of a documentary, The MatchMaker, directed by Benedetta Argentieri.

== Early life and embrace of Islam ==
Gondal, who is of Pakistani descent, was born in Paris, France on January 6, 1994. She is the second-oldest of four children in an upper-middle-class family; her father is a successful businessman and her mother is a housewife. She moved to Britain at the age of three or four and was raised in Walthamstow, East London. She was a permanent resident of Britain. After attending Kelmscott School, she studied English at Goldsmiths, University of London. Although her family practiced a moderate form of Islam, she lived a secular life growing up, later saying, "I believed in Allah and that was it. Nothing resembling a Muslim. Now I realize, of course, I was lost."

Gondal posted on Facebook that November 16, 2012 was "the day Allah guided me to Islam, Alhamdullilah." She stated her religious awakening happened after a teacher challenged her, asking why she chose what parts of Islam she wanted to follow and disregarded everything else. Later that day she approached a Muslim classmate and asked about her faith and her jilbab. The next day, Gondal's classmate brought in a jilbab and hijab for her to try on. From that day forward she wore the jilbab, "stopped everything that was haram" including the cigarettes she was addicted to, and became an enthusiastic Muslim.

== ISIL ==
Gondal made many social media posts about ISIL, even before she left for Syria. On Twitter, she often used the name Umm Muthanna al-Britannia. She tweeted about ISIL's beheading of British aid worker Alan Henning in October 2014, months before her departure from the UK. She also admired the jihadist cleric Anwar al-Awlaki. The Center for Strategic Counterterrorism Communications replied to one of her tweets about al-Awlaki saying he was a hypocrite who had slept with prostitutes. Prior to her departure from Britain, she may have had contact online with Aqsa Mahmood, a Scottish woman who left to join ISIL in 2013.

In early 2015, Gondal left the UK without her family's knowledge and traveled to Syria and ISIL. She was recruited by a Lebanese ISIL member, Abu Abbas al-Lubnani, who contacted her on Twitter, instructed her how to travel to Syria via Turkey, and married her upon her arrival in ISIL territory. Al-Lubnani lived in Raqqa, ISIL's Syrian capital, and had been known to recruit other people online to join ISIL besides Gondal, offering to pay for their travel expenses. Gondal announced her defection on Twitter on February 14.

Gondal was married to al-Lubnani until he was killed in Hasakah in August 2015. After his death, she married another jihadi who was a British citizen. Gondal said she and her second husband spent only four nights together, during which time she became pregnant. She said he told her he wanted to commit a suicide attack but that he also wanted to have a child. Gondal divorced him after a month and a half of marriage, and later gave birth to their son. Her second husband died in a suicide attack when their son was a month old. She married a third time to a jihadi with Russian citizenship. This marriage lasted ten months, until he was killed. Gondal was pregnant when he died and later gave birth to their daughter.

Simon Cottee, an academic who studies terrorism, called Gondal a "prolific, energetic propagandist", the most prolific of all the western ISIL-affiliated women. She posted ISIL propaganda online and recruited women between late 2014 and 2017, and tried to recruit her own younger sister. She posted photos on Twitter of a woman in a black burqa, abaya and Vans shoes, carrying an AK-47; the caption to one of them said "Islamic State: living the life of true freedom". (Gondal would later denied that the veiled woman in the photos was her.) Following the 2015 terror attacks on Paris, she tweeted in support of them. Her Twitter accounts were repeatedly suspended for violating the terms of service by promoting terrorism, but she made new ones. In March 2016, she tweeted about receiving weapons training in an all-female ISIL training camp.

After her husbands were all killed, Gondal had more freedom than most other unmarried widows in ISIL territory: she lived on her own, something not allowed for other unmarried women in ISIL territory; they normally had to stay in special houses for women called madaffas. Gondal also had a car of her own, a gray Kia Rio, drove it herself, and was permitted to wear clothes that ordinary ISIL women were forbidden to wear.

The British Home Office issued an exclusion order in 2017 to prevent Gondal's return to the UK.

== Detention, repatriation and trial ==
In February 2019, during the Battle of Baghuz Fawqani, Gondal escaped Baghuz, which was the last territory ISIL still held in Syria, with her two children. She was trying to reach the Turkish border, but was captured by Kurdish forces and sent with the children to a detention center in Ain Issa. While in custody, she was interviewed by The Sunday Times, and claimed she had been "manipulated". She said she wanted to return to Britain and “prove that I am a changed person... I offer to help prevent vulnerable Muslims from being targeted and radicalised.” She wrote an open letter to the British public, asking to be put on trial in a British court and saying "I have never harmed you, nor do I intend to." She wrote that she had wanted to flee ISIL territory after 2015, but had been warned that her children would be killed if she was caught.

In November 2019, after Turkey attacked northern Syria, Gondal was part of a mass escape from the Ain Issa detention center and walked, with her children and 20 other ISIL-affiliated women and their children, to Turkey. Under the "Cazeneuve protocol", French ISIL members who are found in Turkey are expelled from that country and repatriated to France to face trial. In December that year, she was repatriated to France, the country where she holds citizenship, with three other French wives of jihadists, including Amandine Le Coz and Sahra Ali Mehenni, and the women's seven children. Per the Cazeneuve protocol, on arrival the children were taken into the care of child protective services, and the women were taken into custody.

In 2022, a documentary about Gondal, The MatchMaker, directed by Benedetta Argentieri, premiered at the Venice Film Festival. Argentieri met Gondal in March 2019 while she was filming in Ain Issa, and Gondal was a willing participant in the film. She was asked about ISIL's genocide and enslavement of the Yazidi people and denied knowing that the Yazidis were abused. She said she had once met an enslaved Yazidi girl whom she described as about 13 years old and "very happy and in love", and stated the girl’s enslaver "spoiled" the girl and gave her gifts, but eventually got tired of her and sold her. Gondal also said she knew Allison Fluke-Ekren, who had established the Khatiba Nusaybah, an all-female ISIL battalion which began operations in early 2017. Gondal denied having been part of the Khatiba Nusaybah herself and claimed she didn't know how to use a gun, but said she had seen one of their training sites. She also denied having pledged allegiance to Abu Bakr al-Baghdadi herself and denied having recruited any other women to ISIL, saying, “If they blame me for their inspiration that’s their own opinion.” She claimed to have no memory of tweeting in support of the 2015 Paris attacks and said, "I’m very sorry for my online behavior." She said she regretted having travelled to Syria.

Gondal was tried in France for terror offenses in December 2023. Her attorney argued that she had wanted to escape ISIL since after the birth of her first child. The prosecution requested a sentence of fifteen years in prison, emphasizing Gondal's role as an ISIL influencer and her weapons training under the organization. The court sentenced her to ten years in prison.

== See also ==
- Nora el-Bahty
- Ahmed, Salma and Zahra Halane
- Ugbad and Rahma Sadiq
- Aqsa Mahmood
