= Omar Diaby =

Franco-Senegalese jihadist (1976-)

- Omar Omsen
- Born: 1976 (age 49–50); Dakar, Senegal
- Other name: Super Jihadist
- Organizations: Turkistan Islamic Party (2015–2024); Turkistan Islamic Party in Syria (2016–2025); Firqat al-Ghuraba; (al-Qaeda) Firqat al-Ghuraba
- Known for: Recruitment of foreign fighters during the Syrian Civil War, especially French fighters
- Motive: Salafi jihadism

Omar Diaby, also known by his nom-de-guerre Omar Omsen (born 1976) and by the media as the "Super Jihadist", is a Franco-Senegalese jihadist and YouTuber who was active in Nice, France before fighting with and later commanding the militant group Firqat al-Ghuraba in Syria. Diaby is considered to have recruited approximately 80% of French-speaking jihadists fighting in the Middle East.

== Life ==
Diaby born in Dakar, Senegal. He arrived with his family, who are followers of traditional Tidjian Islam, at the age of 5 at the Cité de l'Ariane in Nice. In the 1990s, he spent several stints in prison for a gang related-murder and a bank statement incident, then for his involvement in several robberies, including that of two jewellery shops in Monaco in 2002 and 2003. He is said to have been radicalised in prison and started working for recruitment and conversion to jihadist Islam in his neighbourhood and via propaganda videos made and circulated on YouTube. In 2011, he was already trying to travel to Afghanistan and Yemen with about ten acolytes, but was arrested at the Nice train station on the day of their departure.

=== Recruitments ===
Around 2012, he worked at a halal sandwich shop called "La Nusra". Diaby is considered by French anti-terrorist services to be a major recruiter of French jihadists for Syria and a close friend of Forsane Alizza, an Islamist group dissolved in 2012 by the government. "Intelligent, eloquent and manipulative", he became known as a preacher and recruiter, even though he benefited from a regime of semi-freedom and spent his nights in the Nice prison. He began directing the 19 HH series of videos, which are very popular on YouTube and other social networks, with the help of Lyonnais Mourad Farès. At the end of 2012, his remarks turned to Syria.

In 2014, the most viewed video produced by Omsen, Destination la Terre Sainte, exceeded 100,000 views. Carefully staged, alternating Arabic and Hollywood music, his videos mix preaching, diverted cinematographic images, often from works of a religious nature, conspiracy theories or messianic works to serve a conspiracy, anti-Semitic, millenarian, sectarian and violent discourse. In the April 2013 video serving as a preamble, 19HH claims to be salafist and takfirist. These films are entitled: "The History of Humanity" — over four hours — "The Truth About Islam" or "The Truth About the Death of Bin Laden." They are held responsible for the first major wave of departures of young French people at a time before the sophisticated audiovisual propaganda of the Islamic State.

He went to Syria in 2013 to lead a group made up mainly of young people from Nice affiliated with the al-Nusra Front, the Syrian branch of al-Qaeda. His group numbered up to 150 fighters, including his brother Moussa. From the end of 2013, his group suffered from tensions when it rejected the Islamic State in order to remain loyal to the jihadist group al-Nusra Front out of reverence for al-Qaeda. He went to Senegal to look for members of his family but he confronted his former friend Mourad Farès on his return.

In 2014, a fifteen-year-old French-Moroccan girl, Nora el-Bahty, traveled to Syria to join his group. Nora’s brother, Fouad, who visited her in Syria, said he felt his sister wanted to return but Diaby was stopping her. As of September 2018, Nora was reported to be living with her child in Idlib, having been married three times to three different men.

== Involvement in conflicts ==
In May 2015, he participated with his group in the battle of Jisr al-Shighour. He was declared dead in August 2015 near the Syrian city of Idlib, but he reappeared in the summer of 2016 in a France 2 report broadcast in Complémentaire d'enquête2. His group then numbered only about forty people, the youngest of whom were Nice residents and Uyghur jihadists from the PIT. Diaby was criticized for staying away from the combat zones. Maintaining that he owed allegiance only to Al-Qaeda and not to the Al-Nusra Front, he was in conflict with his spokesman Abu Firas al-Souri, who was killed in 2016.

Although they distance themselves from ISIS on the ground ("they have a different understanding of Sharia law than ours (...). When you come to a country that is not your own, you don't have the right to immediately impose laws that the people can't understand (...). First of all, we educate the population, we make them understand and love religion. Sharia law is not about cutting off hands, it is not about stoning adulterous women or men"), he does not condemn the attacks of 13 November 2015 and advises to vote for Marine Le Pen in the 2017 presidential election because she promised to stop French military strikes, even if the latter was then referring to Mali and not Syria.

In the summer of 2018, Omar Omsen had disputes with other jihadists in the Idlib region. According to Romain Caillet, "Omar Omsen is accused of having monopolized the homes of his former cronies, but also, and above all, accusations of heterodoxy on the issue of the "jinns", supernatural creatures whose existence is attested in the scriptural texts of the Muslim tradition. In addition, Omar Omsen is also accused of having proclaimed himself an "Islamic judge", without having the skills to do so". In August 2018, Omar Omsen was arrested by Hayat Tahrir al-Sham (HTS) and placed in pre-trial detention in Harim, for having falsely claimed in a statement that he had received the support of a local Islamic court, after a complaint filed against him by French jihadists. However, he was released after a few days, but arrested again by the same group in August 2020, then released in early 2022.

According to researcher Dareen Khalifa, Omar Omsen was released on "the condition that he does not join any other armed group in Idlib, no longer recruit French fighters, no longer incite against France and no longer speak to the media".

In 2025, after the fall of the Bashar al-Assad regime in Syria, two French journalists interviewed Omsen at his home in a small town on the Turkish border. He told them he planned to remain in Syria and that he was "retired", stating, "We fought for Syria. Now our mission is over."

In October, 2025, the Syrian government attacked Omsen's group in Idlib.

== See also ==
- Boubaker El Hakim
- Nora el-Bahty

== Bibliography and footnotes ==
=== Bibliography ===
- Thompson, David (2016). Ils étaient partis faire le jihad. Ils sont de retour en France. Éditions du Seuil. ISBN 978-2-02134-939-9.
