= Salim Benghalem =

Islamic jihadist and terrorist (1980-2017)

- Abou Mohamed al-Faransi Mohamed Ali
- Born: 6 July 1980; Bourg-la-Reine, France
- Died: November 2017 (aged 37); Boukamal, Syria
- Citizenship: French
- Years active: 2011-2017
- Organizations: (al-Qaeda) Al-Qaeda in the Arabian Peninsula (2011); Islamic State (2013-2017)
- Known for: Involvement in the November 2015 Paris attacks

Salim Benghalem (July 1980 — November 2017), also known by his nom de guerre Abou Mohamed al-Faransi, was a French jihadist and terrorist who worked with the Islamic State to plan the November 2015 Paris attacks. He was killed in November 2017 near Boukamal in Syria.

He was considered a “figure of French jihadism”, who was “responsible for welcoming French and French-speaking people into the Islamic State”.

== Life ==
=== Early life and education ===
Benghalem was born in Bourg-la-Reine on 6 July 1980. The fourth in a family of seven children, he grew up in Cachan near Val-de-Marne. At seventeen, he stopped studying work-study sales training, and became involved in drug trafficking and theft.

Involved in a murder in 2001 in Cachan, he fled for a year to Algeria, before returning to France where he was imprisoned in 2002. In 2007, he was formally sentenced to eleven years of imprisonment after five years of pre-trial detention.

=== Radicalization in prison ===
Benghalem became radicalized during the time he spent in prison at the Fresnes Penitentiary Center. There he met various Islamist radicals, including Mohammed El Ayouni, a member of the Buttes-Chaumont network. In prison he also met with Rachid Benomari, a recruiter of jihadists in Belgium and Saïd Arif, a former member of the Armed Islamic Group.

On parole for good behavior from 2008, he settled in Malakoff while becoming close to other members of the Buttes-Chaumont group, including Saïd Kouachi, who would later carry out the Charlie Hebdo shooting, and Amedy Coulibaly, who would later commit the Hypercacher kosher supermarket siege in 2015.

In an Islamic State propaganda video broadcast on 12 February 2015 and filmed under duress by John Cantlie, who was taken hostage, Salim Benghalem “rejoices” at the attacks committed by the Kouachi and Coulibaly brothers, and also welcomed the terrorist Mohammed Merah, “who did something extraordinary”. Close to Boubaker El Hakim, he was also once suspected of preparing the escape of Smaïn Aït Ali Belkacem.

=== Yemen and Syria ===
In the summer of 2011, he went to Yemen with Chérif Kouachi. He stayed there for a month and was trained by al-Qaeda in the Arabian Peninsula. He was commissioned by al-Qaeda to take part in the Charlie Hebdo shooting, but refused the to be involved for unknown reasons. He then went to Syria in April 2013 and joined the Islamic State in Iraq and the Levant. He played a “central role in the transport of jihadists from France” and is suspected of having been in contact with Mehdi Nemmouche, who would later carry out the Jewish Museum of Belgium shooting. In 2023, DGSI police officers identified Salim Benghalem, Mehdi Nemmouche and another French jihadist, on video surveillance images recorded in the basement of an Aleppo hospital converted into a torture center in 2013. The tapes were handed over to French authorities. Benghalem can be seen in the tapes beating prisoners.

He was the deputy of Abu Obeida al-Maghribi and ensured logistics in the Islamic State prison in Aleppo. While he was there, he participated in numerous interrogations, executions, and was also involved in organizing terrorist attacks. He would have participated in August 2013 in the capture of the Menagh military airport. In November of the same year, he was injured in the leg and joined the Islamic Police. With his wife and children who joined him in October 2013, Benghalem took up residence in Cheikh Najar, an industrial zone north of Aleppo, but his wife decided to return after a few months. In January 2014, Islamic State fighters, including Benghalem, evacuated Aleppo after a rebel offensive. Benghalem then became involved in Islamic Police operations that were headquartered in al-Bab. According to the DGSI, he revealed himself as a “sadistic torturer" while he was there.

== Death ==
Targeted by an international arrest warrant and included on the United States Blacklist for his involvement in Islamic State operations, he was sentenced to fifteen years in prison in absentia while in Paris in January 2016. He died after an aerial bombardment by the Syrian Military during the Syrian civil war in November 2017. He had escaped a previous bombardment by the French armed forces in 2015. He died during the Battle of Boukamal.

== See also ==
- Abu Musab al-Zarqawi
- Abu Bakr al-Baghdadi
