= Boubaker El Hakim =

Islamic terrorist (1983-2016), high-ranking officer of the Islamic State

- Abou Mouqâtil At-Tounsî
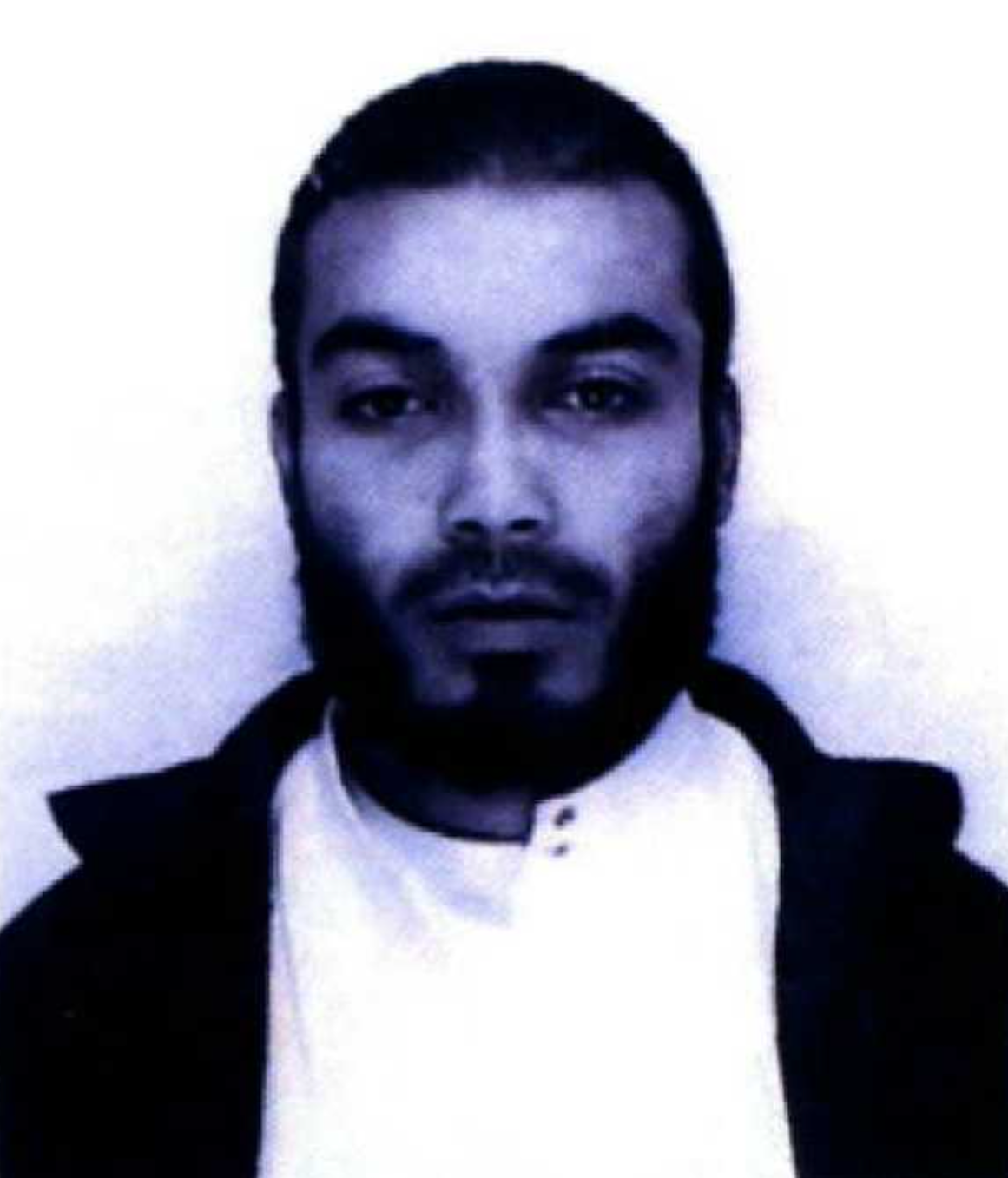
- Passport photograph of El Hakim in 2003, shortly before joining al-Qaeda in Iraq
- Born: August 1, 1983; Paris, France
- Died: November 26, 2016 (aged 33); Raqqa, Syria
- Education: French and Tunisian
- Organizations: Iraq (2003); al-Qaeda in Iraq (2003-2005); Islamic State (2014-2016)
- Known for: First Battle of Fallujah; Second Battle of Fallujah
- Motive: Salafi jihadism

Details
- Victims: 2 unconfirmed (direct); 300+ (indirect)

Boubaker ben Habib ben al-Hakim (1 August 1983 - 26 November 2016), also known as Boubaker El Hakim, Abu Bakr bin Al-Habib Abdul Hakim (Arabic: أبو بكر بن الحبيب عبد الحكيم), or by his nom de guerre Abou Mouqatel, (Note: He received others nom de guerre such as Abū Muqātil at-Tūnusī, Abou Mouqâtil At-Tounsî, Boubakeur al-Hakim, Boubakeur el-Hakim, Abou al Moukatel or Boubacar Hakim) was a Franco-Tunisian jihadist who was the highest ranking French officer in the Islamic State at the time of his death. He was killed by a drone on 26 November 2016 in the Syrian city of Raqqa.

== Life ==
=== Early life and education ===
Boubaker ben Habib El Hakim was born on 1 August 1983 in the 12th arrondissement of Paris. A salesman at Monoprix, he was raised by his mother among two younger sisters. He was the first resident of the Buttes-Chaumont sector to go to the Middle East. In July 2002, at 19 years old, claiming to go to study Arabic and Islam, and like most candidates for Jihad awaiting American intervention in Iraq, he attended the Salafist schools Al Fateh Al Islami and Zahra for six months in Damascus, from where he crossed into Iraq.

Returning to Paris in January 2003, he participated with Farid Benyettou in the development in the 19th arrondissement of a network for sending young jihadist volunteers to Iraq, known as the “Buttes-Chaumont network”. The brothers Chérif and Saïd Kouachi, who would carry out the Charlie Hebdo shooting twelve years later, worked with El Hakim.

At around the same time, while in a jihadist training camp near Baghdad, El Hakim was interviewed by an RTL Group journalist. El Hakim stated that: “I am from Paris 19th! All my friends in the 19th I tell them come and do jihad! I'm ready to blow myself up, set some dynamites and boom boom!". Four days later, in a report by the French television channel La Chaîne Info, he challenged the United States: “I come from France, we are going to kill the Americans! We're going to kill everyone! I live in France! Allahu akbar!".

=== Battle of Fallujah ===
Accompanied by his younger brother Redouane, then aged 19, he fought with Al-Qaeda troops in Iraq against American troops in Fallujah. El Hakim supervised the distribution of French and Tunisian volunteers to separate combatant groups. In a note dedicated to him on 26 May 2005, the DST noted that he “knew a lot of people in Syria and easily crossed the Iraqi border. He had joined a group of five to six people, all Sunnis, having been Baath party cadres or being Islamists".

With his group, El Hakim laid 80 kilometres (50 mi) of mines, which were detonated when American convoys passed. The attack earned him the compliments of Sheikh Abdullah al-Janabi, a radical imam of Fallujah, who a decade later would become one of the most popular preachers of the Islamic State. His brother died there on 17 July 2004 during an American-led bombing in Fallujah. Their mother telephoned the home of another member of the Buttes-Chaumont network and enthused: “Good news: my son died a martyr!" Another time she predicted: “My children are destined for this.” Subsequently, she went to the Iraqi-Syrian zone. El Hakim was arrested without a passport on the Iraqi-Syrian border and returned to France in June 2005.

Despite his comments in the media, El Hakim was not worried upon his return to France. Made up of neighborhood friends attending the Adda'wa mosque on rue de Tanger, including the Kouachi brothers, the sector was structured around a spiritual leader, Farid Benyettou, while El Hakim playsed the role of operational relay. Around ten members of the gang reached Iraq in the mid-2000s, where three of them lost their lives. He sent Mohamed el-Ayouni and Peter Chérif to participate in the First Battle of Fallujah. el-Ayouni was wounded three times by gunfire and a rocket, and as a result lost his eye and left arm. Chérif was captured by coalition forces, until his prison was attacked by rebels and he took the opportunity to escape with 150 other inmates.

=== Return to Iraq ===
Returning to Iraq for the third time at 20 years old, he fought alongside Abu Musab Al-Zarqawi, who would become the leader of al-Qaeda several months later. In August 2004, he returned to Syria, where he was arrested again and imprisoned for nine months before being deported to France on 31 May 2005. He was indicted and imprisoned for terrorism charges. He was sentenced on 14 May 2006 to seven years in prison, with a security sentence of four years and eight months, for having facilitated the transit of his colleagues to Syria.

Released on 5 January 2011, he settled in Tunisia, his parents' country of origin, where the regime of President Zine el-Abidine Ben Ali had just been overthrown.

=== Tunisia and Libya ===
Once in Tunisia, he brought weapons from Libya, then in the middle of a civil war, to arm Tunisian jihadists. He planned the murder of two political opponents of Ennahdha, the ruling Islamist party at the time, in order to throw the Tunisian democratic transition into chaos. Lawyer Chokri Belaïd was shot dead on 6 February 2013 in front of his home in Tunis. Five months later, on July 25, Mohamed Brahmi was killed in front of his family. Tunisian Interior Minister Lotfi Ben Jeddou stated that Abu Bakr Al-Hakim was involved in the assassination of Brahmi, and in addition to his involvement in this assassination, he was also "involved in the case of weapons confiscation in Mnihla, Medenine, and Douar Hicher."

On 17 December 2014 in Syria, he already claimed responsibility, under the nom de guerre of Abou Mouqatil, for the double murder in an IS propaganda video: “Yes, tyrants, it is we who killed Chokri Belaïd and Mohamed Brahmi […] We will come back and kill many of you. You will not live in peace until Tunisia applies Islamic law”.

In an interview published on 30 March 2015 in the eighth issue of the English-speaking jihadist magazine Dabiq, El Hakim personally claimed responsibility for the murder of Mohamed Brahmi: “we stayed for four hours in front of this tyrant's house, we were waiting until 'When he left the house and got into the car, I killed him with ten bullets'.

These two assassinations provoked major demonstrations hostile to Islamists and jihadist Salafists having an effect contrary to that sought: "Our brother Kamâl Gafgâzî led the first operation in order to spread chaos in the country. It was a success but the pretenders for Jihad defended the institutions of the old government and ruined our efforts, may Allah guide them. We tried again with Brahmi and the same thing happened”.

In April 2014, El Hakim left Libya where he had taken refuge, crossed Turkey and, ten years after his first stay, returned to Syria where he was welcomed by Salim Benghalem. In the summer, he was reportedly wounded by a sniper shot, but he continued to be active within the Islamic State.

=== Member of the Islamic State ===
El Hakim took part in the Syrian Civil War where he fought with members of the Islamic State. In July 2014, he participated in the Battle of Division-17, where he was injured by sniper fire. In the fall of 2014, he led a battalion of 1,000 men. Subsequently, he joined the Amniyat, the intelligence service of the Islamic State.

He was one of the most important French people in the organization, in charge of a commando dedicated to preparing attacks in France. The American State Department added him to its blacklist of “foreign terrorist fighters” on 29 September 2015, specifying that it would have studied the possibility of “targeting European diplomats stationed in North Africa”. The DGSI suspected El Hakim of having planned in the fall of 2016, within an Islamic State cell responsible for external operations, half a dozen attacks which were to strike Europe and the Maghreb, including the members of the commando who were arrested in Strasbourg and Marseille on the night of 19 November 2016.

He was also suspected of being involved “in the design and management of the project” of the attack prepared by the Reda Kriket network, arrested on 24 March 2016 in Boulogne-Billancourt, then for having been in contact in October with the Syrian Jaber al-Bakr in Chemnitz. El Hakim later sponsored an attack carried out on 28 October 2016 on a police officer in Constantine, Algeria.

In his interview in Dabiq in March 2015, two months after the January 2015 attacks in France committed in particular by the Kouachi brothers, he no longer called on jihadists to go to the Middle East, but to strike in the country where they are: “Kill anyone. All disbelievers are targets for us. Don't bother looking for specific targets. Kill any disbeliever". El Hakim may have also participated in the following terrorist incidents:

- Charlie Hebdo shootjng on January 7, 2015
- Bardo National Museum attack on 18 March 2015
- November 2015 Paris attacks on 13 November 2015

One of his younger sisters was arrested on 6 December 2016 in Paris by the DGSI before being indicted and placed in pre-trial detention on the 10th. She is suspected of having left for Syria in 2015 with her daughter born in 2010 to reach areas controlled by the Islamic State.

== Death ==
El Hakim was killed on 26 November 2016 the Pentagon announced that Abu Bakr Al-Hakim was killed in an airstrike by the United States in Raqqa, Syria. It was initially thought that he could have survived the strike, although he was later confirmed dead.

== See also ==
- Abu Bakr al-Baghdadi, former head of the Islamic State
