= Sahra Ali Mehenni =

French Muslim who traveled to Syria to join ISIL in 2014, at age 17

Sahra Ali Mehenni is a French Muslim woman who, at age 17, left her home in Lézignan-Corbières and traveled to Syria to join the Islamic State of Iraq and the Levant in 2014. She was one of the youngest French people known to have joined ISIL. In 2019, she was repatriated to France.

== Life in France and departure for Syria ==
Ali Mehenni was born to a middle-class family in a small town near Narbonne. She has several siblings and shared a bedroom with her younger sister. Her father, an industrial chemist, is an Algerian Muslim born in France, and her mother is a French-born Catholic. Ali Mehenni's mother never embraced Islam and described herself as an atheist, and she and her husband had raised their children areligiously.

Ali Mehenni formally converted to Islam a year and a half before her disappearance. She began to pray regularly, eventually five times a day, and became increasingly religious. She ordered a jilbab through the mail and began to wear it. Her mother disapproved of her choice to wear the veil, and Ali Mehenni called her an "infidel" who was "impure" and had no right to judge her choices. Her family forbid her to leave the house in a full veil, afraid she'd be subject to Islamophobic attacks.

Ali Mehenni dropped out of school for six months, causing tension in her family. She wanted to become a child care worker but her teachers didn’t think this was appropriate for her. She spent a lot of time online on the computer. It was in her bedroom, and her family didn't pay attention to her internet activity. She told her family she was talking to a boy online who was also a convert to Islam. She also spoke about news reports of the Syrian Civil War and said she would like to do humanitarian work there. By the time she went missing, Ali Mehenni had enrolled in a new school. Shortly before her disappearance, she asked her mother for her passport, saying she wanted to get her paperwork in order as she would soon be an adult.

On 11 March 2014, she told her father she was taking some extra clothing to school to show her friends how to wear the veil. Her father dropped her off at the train station as he normally did so she could go to school. Instead she took a train to the airport in Marseille, flew to Istanbul, and crossed the border into Syria. Ali Mehenni’s family did not realize anything was amiss until just before dinner, when she wasn't at the train station to be picked up by her father. The next day, they noticed her passport was missing. The family contacted the police, who opened a criminal investigation and seized Ali Mehenni's computer.

== After arrival in Syria ==
Three days after her departure from France, Ali Mehenni called her family and said she was fine, but refused to tell them where she was. She contacted her older brother over Facebook and said she was in a village near Aleppo. She continued to keep in touch with her family after her arrival, by text message and phone calls. She stayed in a guest house with other women. Her family said they could hear other people in the background of their phone conversations. They felt she was following a script given by ISIL. Within weeks of her arrival in Syria, Ali Mehenni called her family to tell them she had married a 25-year-old Tunisian ISIL fighter she had just met, named Farid. She said her father had no say in her marriage because he was not a real Muslim.

Ali Mehenni's family stated they believed she had been radicalized over social media. Her parents said they were not sure if the Facebook messages they received from her account were actually being written by her. They criticized the French government for allowing her to leave the country so easily, saying, "The law needs to be changed because it's absurd that a minor can leave the country without parental permission, just with an identity card or passport."

== After the fall of ISIL ==
In 2019, ISIL was defeated at its territorial last stand at Baghuz. Ali Mehenni was detained in the camp in Ayn Issa in southeast Syria. In November that year, she was part of a mass escape from the camp with eight hundred others when Turkey launched its military offensive in the region.

Ali Mehenni, two other French women who had joined ISIL, and the three women's five children surrendered to authorities in Turkey, who arranged for her repatriation to France. If they had remained in Syria, they would not have been repatriated, as French citizens detained in Syrian camps are left to face Syrian justice. Under the "Cazeneuve protocol", French ISIL members who are found in Turkey are expelled from that country and repatriated to France to face trial. A lawyer representing the women's families said they had "long wanted to return to France to face the consequences of their actions."

In December, the now 23-year-old Ali Mehenni was repatriated to France with three other French wives of jihadists (including Tooba Gondal and Amandine Le Coz) and the women's seven children. As per the Cazeneuve protocol, on arrival the children were taken into the care of child protective services, and the women were taken into custody.

== See also ==
- Sharmeena Begum
- Brides of the Islamic State
- Nora el-Bahty
- Aqsa Mahmood
- Tomasa Pérez Molleja
- Ugbad and Rahma Sadiq
- University of Medical Sciences and Technology disappearances
