= Simon Cottee =

British criminologist

Simon Cottee is an academic who works as a senior lecturer in criminology at the University of Kent, and is a regular contributor to The Atlantic. He previously worked at Bangor University and the University of the West Indies' Trinidad campus.

He is the author of The Apostates: When Muslims Leave Islam (Hurst Publishers, 2015), which the publishers claim is "the first major study of apostasy from Islam in the Western secular context". In a review published in New Humanist, Alom Shaha wrote that the book "brings sensitivity and empathy to an intensely polarised debate". Nick Cohen, writing in The Spectator, argues that Cottee "shows how elements in the left and academia are happy to denounce Muslims who exercise their freedom to abandon their religion as 'native informers' who have gone over to the side of western imperialism". His collection of essays, ISIS and the Pornography of Violence, came out in 2019. His book Black Flags of the Caribbean: How Trinidad Became an ISIS Hotspot, published in 2021, theorizes the ideology of the Jamaat al Muslimeen led to the rise of ISIS support in Trinidad.

Cottee is also editor, with Thomas Cushman, of Christopher Hitchens and His Critics: Terror, Iraq, and the Left (New York University Press, 2008). Cottee's published research also includes journal articles on topics including the murder of Theo van Gogh and the motivations of terrorists. He has argued that gang culture offers a way of understanding the appeal of ISIS . Cottee also argues that the group's propaganda videos have a "pornographic quality". He was interviewed for The MatchMaker, a documentary about ISIS recruiter Tooba Gondal.

== Books ==
- Cottee, Simon (2015). The Apostates: When Muslims Leave Islam. London: C. Hurst & Co. Publishers. ISBN 978-1849044691.
- Cushman, Thomas; Cottee, Simon, eds. (2008). Christopher Hitchens and His Critics: Terror, Iraq, and the Left. New York: New York University Press. ISBN 978-0814716878.
- Cottee, Simon (2026). Europe’s Jihadi Migrants: Mapping Migrant Involvent in Jihadi Terrorism in Europe (2015-2025) (PDF) (1st ed.). Danube Institute.
- Cottee, Simon (24 June 2022). Watching Murder: ISIS, Death Videos and Radicalization. Routledge. ISBN 978-1000603798.
- Cottee, Simon (25 March 2021). Black Flags of the Caribbean: How Trinidad Became an ISIS Hotspot. I.B. Tauris. ISBN 978-0755616947.
- Cottee, Simon (30 May 2019). ISIS and the Pornography of Violence. Anthem Press. ISBN 978-1783089673.

== See also ==
- Emraan Ali and Jihad Ali, Trinidadian jihadist father and son, whom Cottee wrote about
- Gailon Su and Su-lay Su, Trinidadian mother and son tricked into travel king to ISIS, whom Cottee wrote about
