= Firqat al-Ghuraba =

Jihadist group in Syria

- فرقة الغرباء
- Leader: Omar Diaby
- Dates active: 2013–present
- Headquarters: Harem, Idlib Governorate, Syria
- Ideology: Islamic extremism Jihadism
- Part of: Jabhat al-Nusra (until 2017); Turkistan Islamic Party in Syria (2015–2025); Ansar al-Tawhid (2018–2025)
- Wars: Syrian Civil War; Inter-rebel conflict during the Syrian Civil War; Syrian conflict (2024–present); 2025 Harem clashes

Firqat al-Ghuraba (lit. 'the Foreigners' Brigade') is a jihadist group based in the Idlib Governorate in northwestern Syria. Mostly consisting of foreign fighters from Europe, particularly France and Belgium. The group is believed to have sworn allegiance to al-Qaeda and is currently led by Omar Diaby.

== History ==
The group was established by Omar Diaby, a French citizen of Senegalese heritage. He had recruited foreign fighters to fight in Syria and many would later join either the Islamic State of Iraq and the Levant or al-Nusra Front.

The group, consisting of 80-100 fighters, was established in the Latakia Governorate of Syria after Diaby entered Syria. Most of the fighters reportedly were from France.

As tensions rose between ISIL and al-Nusra in early 2014, Diaby chose to remain neutral and said that he would ally with neither due to reports of violations against civilians by both ISIL and al-Nusra. Diaby has criticized ISIL as reactionary and engaging in deviant behaviour, but justified ISIL's November 2015 Paris attacks, citing the Quran's teaching of "transgress for equal transgression" as a response to French military operations. It is also believed that the group lost many of its members in defections to ISIL.

It is believed that the group later joined and fought as part of al-Nusra Front, but broke away following the latter's cutting of ties with al-Qaeda, which Diaby called a "major betrayal".

Diaby was believed to have been killed sometime in the mid-2015 but reappeared in early 2016 as a prisoner of Hayat Tahrir al-Sham (HTS), al-Nusra's successor organisation.

Despite losing many of its original members in defections to ISIL, the group reportedly saw an increase in membership after ISIL's decline in territory.

=== Tensions with Hayat Tahrir al-Sham ===
In 2018, tensions over the fate of the daughter of a deceased Firqat al-Ghuraba fighter resulted in a HTS raid against the group's headquarters. Diaby was accused of kidnapping the girl and extorting her mother, who had divorced the fighter, residing in Belgium. The conflict also involved al-Qaeda's Syrian branch the Hurras al-Din, and resulted in Diaby's arrest by HTS. The conflict was resolved when it was agreed that the daughter would be released to her mother and kidnapping charges against Diaby dropped; however, Diaby remained in custody even afterwards.

Diaby was also reported to have been arrested by HTS security forces multiple times in relation to Islamic heterodoxy, delivering fatwas without the authority to do so, and financial impropriety in 2018, and again in 2020 in relation to a conflict with the Turkistan Islamic Party in Syria. He was released in 2022 on the condition that he be confined to his camp.

=== 2025 Harem clashes ===
In October 2025, fierce fighting broke out in the city of Harem in the northern countryside of Idlib Governorate between Firqat al-Ghuraba and its foreign nationals' families and the Syrian transitional government security forces. In an audio recording circulating on social media, Diaby accused the Syrian security forces of planning an attack on the camp under the direction of French intelligence in an attempt to secure the extradition of two of its members. Diaby's son, Jibril, claimed that the clash was related to the French government's desire to secure the extradition of two fighters in the group.

The Syrian transitional government alleged that Firqat al-Ghuraba had abducted a girl and refused to surrender her to the authorities. The commander of the internal security forces of Idlib has additionally accused Diaby of using civilian shields.

The two sides subsequently reached a ceasefire agreement that stipulated the withdrawal of heavy weapons by government forces and allowed the Syrian government access to the camp. The agreement also stipulated that a criminal investigation would be launched into the kidnapping allegations against Diaby.
