= Peter Cherif =

French Islamic militant

Peter Cherif, also known as Abu Hamza, is a French Islamic militant who has been a member of Al-Qaeda in Iraq and Al-Qaeda in the Arabian Peninsula. He is also believed to have assisted the planning of the Charlie Hebdo shooting.

He was arrested in Djibouti on 16 December 2018, and extradited to France on charges of terrorism. As of December 2024, he is still in prison without parole.

== Early life ==
Cherif was born sometime in 1982 near the Parc des Buttes Chaumont in the 19th arrondissement of Paris, France. His father, who died when his son was 14, was a Catholic Afro-Caribbean immigrant. His mother, Myriam, was born in Tunisia.

== Radicalization ==
Cherif converted to Islam in 2003 and was radicalised by the 2003 invasion of Iraq. Farid Benyettou was his mentor.

In early 2004, Cherif took part in protests against a French law banning Islamic head scarves in public schools. He was filmed by news crews and police intelligence officers next to Farid Benyettou.

He left for Damascus in May 2004, saying he was going to join friends studying at a Koranic school. The school was known as a way station for European fighters on their way to Iraq.

U.S. troops in Iraq captured Cherif and another Frenchman near Fallujah on 2 December 2004. He was wounded twice fighting in the First Battle of Fallujah and the Second Battle of Fallujah. Cherif was detained, unarmed, at a checkpoint and imprisoned at Camp Bucca. In August 2005, he was transferred to Abu Ghraib prison.

He was convicted in Baghdad in July 2006 for illegally crossing the border, and sentenced to 15 years in prison. He escaped in March 2007 in a prison break by the Islamic State of Iraq. He travelled to Syria, where he was arrested, extradited, and served 18 months in prison in France. He was released pending trial and fled the country to Yemen. He was sentenced to five years in prison, in absentia, for being a member of a terrorist organization on 16 August 2012.

In the summer of 2011, he was present at a meeting with Chérif Kouachi in Yemen to plan the Charlie Hebdo shooting. Peter Cherif helped provide Kouachi with cash and a few days of al Qaeda training, according to French and U.S. intelligence officials.

In May 2011, he was involved in interpreting for AQAP in the case of three French aid workers kidnapped in Yemen by the group.

According to his United Nations listing, he has been involved in the recruitment of foreign fighters and facilitated their travel to Yemen from Tunisia, via Oman. He is also suspected to have been identified in 2013 on a speedboat, during a reconnaissance operation along the Hadramawt coast of Yemen in order to plan a maritime terrorist attack.

He lived with his wife and children in the town of Mukalla, Hadramawt province, Yemen, and believed to be working for the "legal service" of AQAP.

He was arrested in Djibouti on 16 December 2018 and within a short term in which his legal status had to be cleared by the authorities extradited to France.

In January 2019, Cherif's wife, Soulef A, was provisionally detained on charges of criminal association with terrorists and financing a terrorist enterprise. On 16 September 2024, he was on trial at a court in Paris. He was sentenced to life imprisonment on 3 October 2024.

=== US and UN sanctions ===
Cherif was sanctioned by the United States Department of the State on 29 September 2015.

He was listed on 29 September 2015 by the United Nations Security Council as "being associated with Al-Qaida for "participating in the financing, planning, facilitating, preparing, or perpetrating of acts or activities by, in conjunction with, under the name of, on behalf of, or in support of", "recruiting for" and "otherwise supporting act or activities" of Al-Qaida in Iraq and Al-Qaida in the Arabian Peninsula (AQAP)".
