= Nora el-Bahty =

French Muslim girl who traveled to Syria at 15 to join the civil war

- Born: 1999 (age 26–27); France
- Occupation: student
- Known for: travel to Syria, Firqat al-Ghuraba member
- Children: 1

Nora el-Bahty is a French Muslim woman (sometimes misidentified as Nora el-Bathy, a Jew) who, at age 15, left her home in Avignon to join a foreign brigade in the Syrian civil war in 2014. Three French people were convicted in her case, and her disappearance is discussed in the book Under the Black Flag: An Exclusive Insight into the Inner Workings of ISIS by Sami Moubayed. Nora’s fate is unclear; she was last reported to be living in Syria in 2018.

== Life in France and departure for Syria ==
Nora el-Bahty is the third of six children, the daughter of Moroccan immigrants. Her parents were practicing Muslims. Prior to her disappearance, she had talked about helping the wounded people in Syria. She had also asked her parents for her passport, saying she had lost her identity card. However none of her family suspected she was planning to go to Syria. Unbeknownst to her family, she began wearing a jilbab, hijab and gloves to school; she never dressed that way in front of her family. In December 2013, she was absent from school for a week; her family didn’t find out until after she disappeared.

On January 23, 2014, Nora did not return home after school. Instead she withdrew money from her savings account, changed her mobile phone, and travelled to Paris to meet Zoé Bouah, a woman she had been in touch with online. Bouah's husband, Mouhammad Diallo, was already in Syria, having travelled there in 2013 to join the Islamic State of Iraq and the Levant. Bouah put Nora up in her home overnight, gave her food and a full face veil, and promised to travel with her the next day. Bouah's sister-in law, Sonia Mareghni, was also at her home that night. Mareghni helped Nora search online for a plane ticket to Turkey, then lent Nora her credit card to pay for it, but the charge would not go through. The next day, Mareghni and Bouah accompanied Nora to a travel agency and Mareghni helped pay for Nora's ticket. The women accompanied Nora to Orly Airport. Bouah decided not to join her on her trip after all.

Nora flew to Istanbul, then took a second flight to the Syrian border. Her destination was Firqat al-Ghuraba, a brigade of foreign fighters run by Omar Diaby.

== After arrival in Syria ==
Nora's parents reported her missing, and her brother, Fouad, questioned her friends. The family discovered she had opened a second Facebook account where she was in contact with Paris-area jihadist recruiters, and had a second mobile phone to call them.

Three days after her arrival in Syria, Nora called her family and said she was fine and didn't want to return. Her parents received two further phone calls, from a man asking their permission for her to marry. They refused. Nora texted Fouad to say she was in Aleppo. He decided to go to Syria to find her, but was turned back at the Turkish border. Omar Diaby himself eventually called Fouad and said Nora was safe, was not being held against her will, and wanted to remain in Syria.

By mid-March, less than two months after arriving in Syria, Nora told her family she wanted to return home. She referred to the militants as "liars" and "hypocrites” who “terrorized the Syrians.” That same month, Nora's father and Fouad went to Syria and made their case before a sharia judge there, who said they could have Nora only on the condition that they stay in Syria to settle. Nora's father and brother returned to France without her.

In April or May, Fouad was permitted to visit his sister in Syria and said she was living in a house with several other women and children. Diaby took Fouad to Nora's house and told him he loved her and that he was the reason she had remained unmarried. She and other women were caring for jihadis’ young children and orphans. Her brother said there were many young children under ten there, and that they were from countries all over the world.

He was able to see Nora twice, once for thirty minutes and another time for two minutes. Fouad described his sister as "thin and sick" and said she wept and told him, "I’ve made the biggest mistake of my life." Nora told Fouad she had gone to Syria because she felt it was her duty to help suffering Muslims, but upon arrival she was told she would not be permitted to leave. When Fouad suggested they go home together, Nora said, “I can't.” Fouad said he felt she wanted to return and Diaby was stopping her. He offered to take her a third country, such as Morocco or Saudi Arabia, instead of home to France, but Diaby refused to allow it. Fouad gave Nora some money and a phone to call home with, but said those items were taken from her.

Fouad returned to France again without Nora. In October 2014, he said all contact with Nora had been cut off since his visit.

== Criminal trial in France and el-Bahty's fate ==
In November 2017, Bouah, Diallo and Mareghni were put on trial for facilitating Nora's disappearance. Bouah was sentenced to five years in prison for child abduction and conspiracy related to a terrorist enterprise, and Mareghni to three years. They were also ordered to pay €100,000 in damages to the el-Bahty family. Diallo, whom the prosecution alleged was the primary facilitator of Nora's journey into jihadist-controlled territory, was sentenced to twelve years in prison for terrorist criminal association.

Mareghni and Bouah were the first women in French history to be convicted of such acts. In 2018, the women's sentences were reduced on appeal, and the amount of damages they had to pay Nora's family was reduced to €15,000.

By September 2018, Nora was reported to be living with her child in Idlib, having been married three times to three different men.

== See also ==
- Tareena Shakil – Former English terrorist
- Ifthekar Jaman – British-Bangladeshi man who traveled to Syria and joined ISIL
- Sharmeena Begum – British jihadist (born 1999)
- Aqsa Mahood
- Shamima Begum – British-born woman who joined the IS
- Ugbad and Rahma Sadiq – Somali-born Norwegian sisters who joined Daesh
- Sahra Ali Mehenni
- Brides of the Islamic State
- Amira Karroum
