= Killing of Niklas Pöhler =

2016 murder in Bonn, Germany

- Location: Bonn, North Rhine-Westphalia, Germany
- Date: 7 May 2016 (attack); 13 May 2016 (death); 0:20 (CEST)
- Attack type: Beating
- Victim: Niklas Pöhler
- Accused: 2

On 7 May 2016, 17-year-old Niklas Pöhler was knocked unconscious and beaten by a trio of men in Bonn, Germany. Pöhler died of severe head injuries inflicted in the attack six days later. On 18 May, 20-year-old Walid S. was arrested on suspicion of being the main perpetrator. Two accomplices are still being sought by the police. The case received extensive media attention in Germany. Bonn police received 400,000 entries on their Facebook page.

== Attack ==
On the evening of 6 May 2016, Pöhler had attended a concert in Bad Godesberg district as part of Rhein in Flammen with his sister, and two friends. At a bus station, the group encountered three men, who verbally provoked Pöhler and his friend. According to the chief prosecutor, Pöhler wanted to avoid violence and resolve the situation amicably. One of the female friends of Niklas was reportedly slapped and was later groped. Subsequently, Pöhler was struck violently on the head. After he had fallen down, the perpetrator Walid S. kicked his head twice with great force.

=== Search and arrest ===
Bonn police began an intense manhunt. The suspects had been described as appearing of migration background, but noted to have spoken German without accents. Flyers were handed out in the German, Arabic and Turkish languages. There were also two demonstrations, one of 50 far-right protesters and a counter-demonstration of several hundred people. On 18 May, police arrested 20-year-olds Walid S. and Roman W. on suspicion of committing the fatal assault in Mehlem district. Two men arrested alongside Walid S. were released. S. provided an alibi, which was disproven by investigators.

== Victim ==
Niklas Pöhler was born on 23 September 1998 in Bad Breisig. He had been attending the Abendrealschule in Bad Godesberg.

== Suspects ==
Walid S. was born in 1995 in Piacenza, Italy, to Moroccan parents. His father physically abused his mother, frequently beating Walid S. as well for attempting to shield her from beatings. Following the divorce of his parents in 2013, Walid S. moved to Germany with his mother and younger brother, living with an aunt in Bad Godesberg. S. was frequently arrested for assault crimes, last on 30 April 2016, when he started a brawl at a disco. The night of the killing, Walid S. had been at the Kurpark with his girlfriend and left to get drinks at a gas station. He returned to her several hours later without mentioning the assault.

Roman W. was 20 years old at the time of the assault. He was a German national without a migration background. The third man involved in the assault was never identified.

On 20 June, it was reported that a new piece of evidence, a jacket stained with blood of Niklas P., was found in the residence of Walid S., who still denied the accusations saying the jacket did not belong to him. There were allegations against the chief prosecutor of concealing the evidence for several days.

== Trial ==
Beginning January 2017, Walid S. was tried for bodily harm causing death, but the charge was dropped. Witnesses had been unable to certainly identify S. as the attacker to deal the fatal blows. He was instead convicted of dangerous bodily harm for the April 2016 assault case in May 2017, receiving eight months imprisonment.

== Aftermath ==
In January 2020, S. was sentenced to six years imprisonment for attempted manslaughter in a different instance from 2019.

== See also ==
- Immigration and crime in Germany
