= 2016 Ludwigshafen attempted bombings =

Terrorist plot in Ludwigshafen, Germany

On 16 December 2016, a bombing plot was uncovered in Ludwigshafen, Germany. The perpetrator, a 12-year-old boy of German-Iraqi descent, was reportedly directed by an ISIL supporter to build two nail bombs and plant them at the local Christmas market and near a shopping centre.

== Incidents ==
After a first attempt failed at the Christmas market on 26 November when the bomb did not explode, the boy tried a second time on 5 December near the mall and the town hall of Ludwigshafen. He was reported to have been radicalised or instructed by an unidentified ISIS member. The German federal prosecutor declined to comment on the ISIS stories and announced an investigation into his motives. The device contained “pyrotechnic material” believed to have been extracted from fireworks and sparklers, and tests revealed that while the mix was combustible, it was not explosive. The state youth welfare office took charge of the boy.

== Suspect ==
The suspect was born in Ludwigshafen, but his name was not released because of German privacy laws. German law prohibits the criminal prosecution of individuals younger than 14 years. The suspect had contemplated traveling to Syria in mid-2016 to join the Islamic State.

== Investigation and trial ==
On 13 April 2018, an Islamic State supporter was sentenced in Vienna to nine years in prison for instigating the crime and for planning another attack on the US airbase in Ramstein, Germany, along with a 15-year-old girl married to him under Islamic law. During the trial, the suspect of the Ludwigshafen bombing, now 14 years old, emphasized that the bombing was entirely his idea, stating that the bombing failed solely because the fuse cord was insufficient.

== Reactions ==
- Steffen Seibert, a spokesman for the German government, said: "This is certainly a report that scares everyone."
- Peter Altmaier, the German minister of the chancellery, said that the authorities were "sensitized". They had to investigate whether the child was radicalised at home or through the internet.

== See also ==
- 2016 Düsseldorf terrorism plot
- 2016 Chemnitz terrorism plot
