= Gert Neuhaus =

German artist

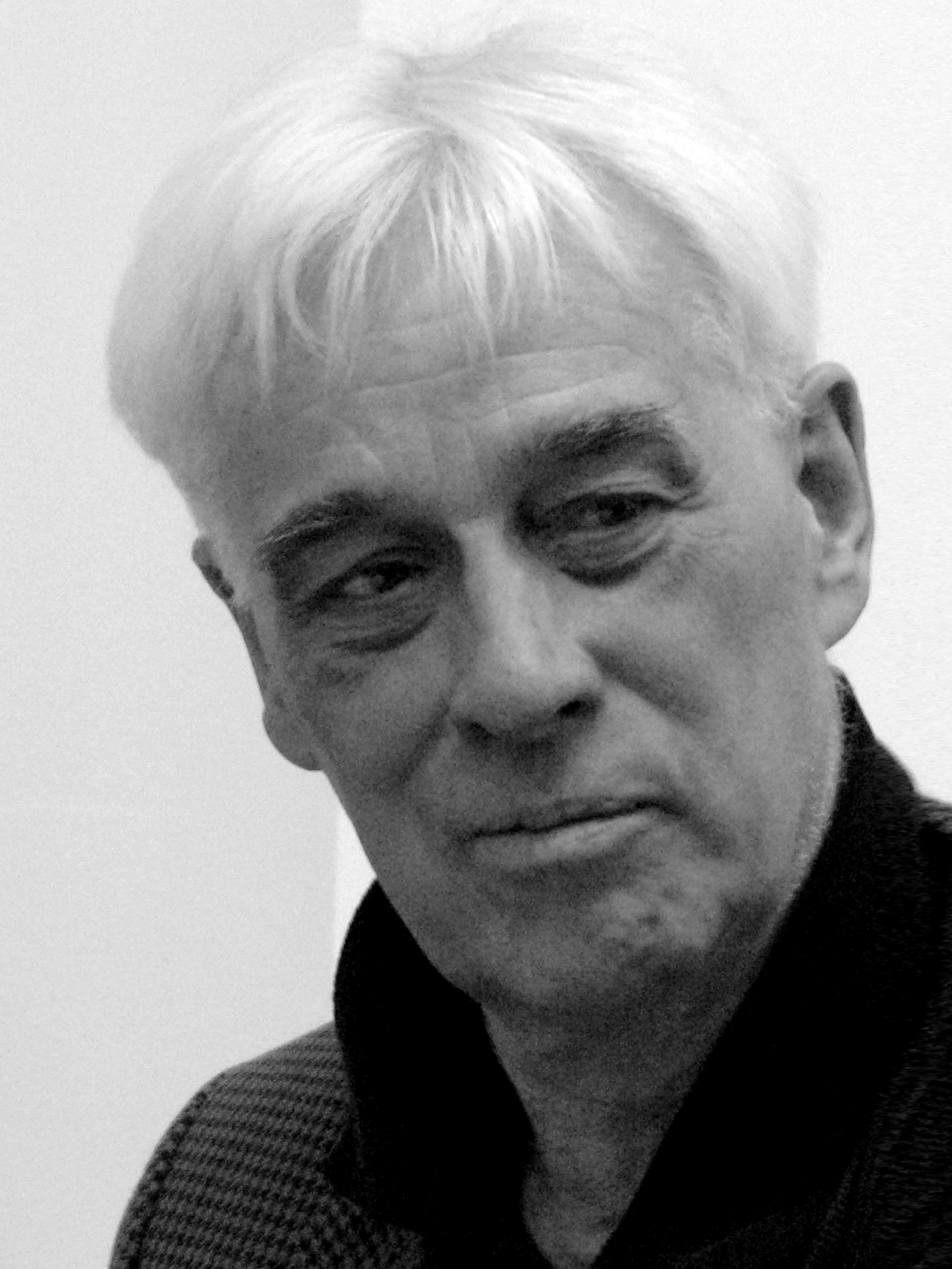
Gert Neuhaus Portrait

Gert Neuhaus (born February 21, 1939) is a German artist.

== Academics ==
Neuhaus was born in Berlin, Germany. He studied graphics and exhibition design at the University of Arts Berlin (HdK), 1956–1962. Since 1982, he has been teaching arts at several universities and academies in Berlin.

== Type of work ==
After doing freelance exhibition work, he owned and ran his own gallery until 1976. Since then, he has designed and completed works for large facades and murals, i.e. design for Multiplex cinemas in several German cities, as well as interior design in hotels, hospitals and private swimming pools in Germany and across Europe.

== Finished works ==
Currently about 45 building-high murals have been finished, with a total of 25,000 m^{2} (269,000 ft^{2}). All of them were painted in long-lasting, weatherproof acrylic colors; the lifespan of the paintings is about 30 years. A mural of 500 m^{2} (5,400 ft^{2}), can be completed in 4 to 6 weeks, including scaffolding setup and proper surface preparation.
