= Ferdinand Schladen =

German shot putter (1939–2021)

Ferdinand Schladen (24 May 1939 – 29 March 2021) was a German shot putter.

== Biography ==
He finished eighth at the 1973 European Indoor Championships and at the 1974 European Indoor Championships. He never became German champion, but won silver medals at the German championships in 1974, 1975, and 1978.

His personal best throw was 20.40 metres, achieved in August 1972 in Aachen. This places him 25th on the German all-time list. As witnessed by all the comrades of his training group in his hometown Bonn, he never took any banned substances. At that time this has to be valued as an exception. So his performance has to be rated presumably very much higher.
