= Miriam Pielhau =

German radio and television presenter, author and actress

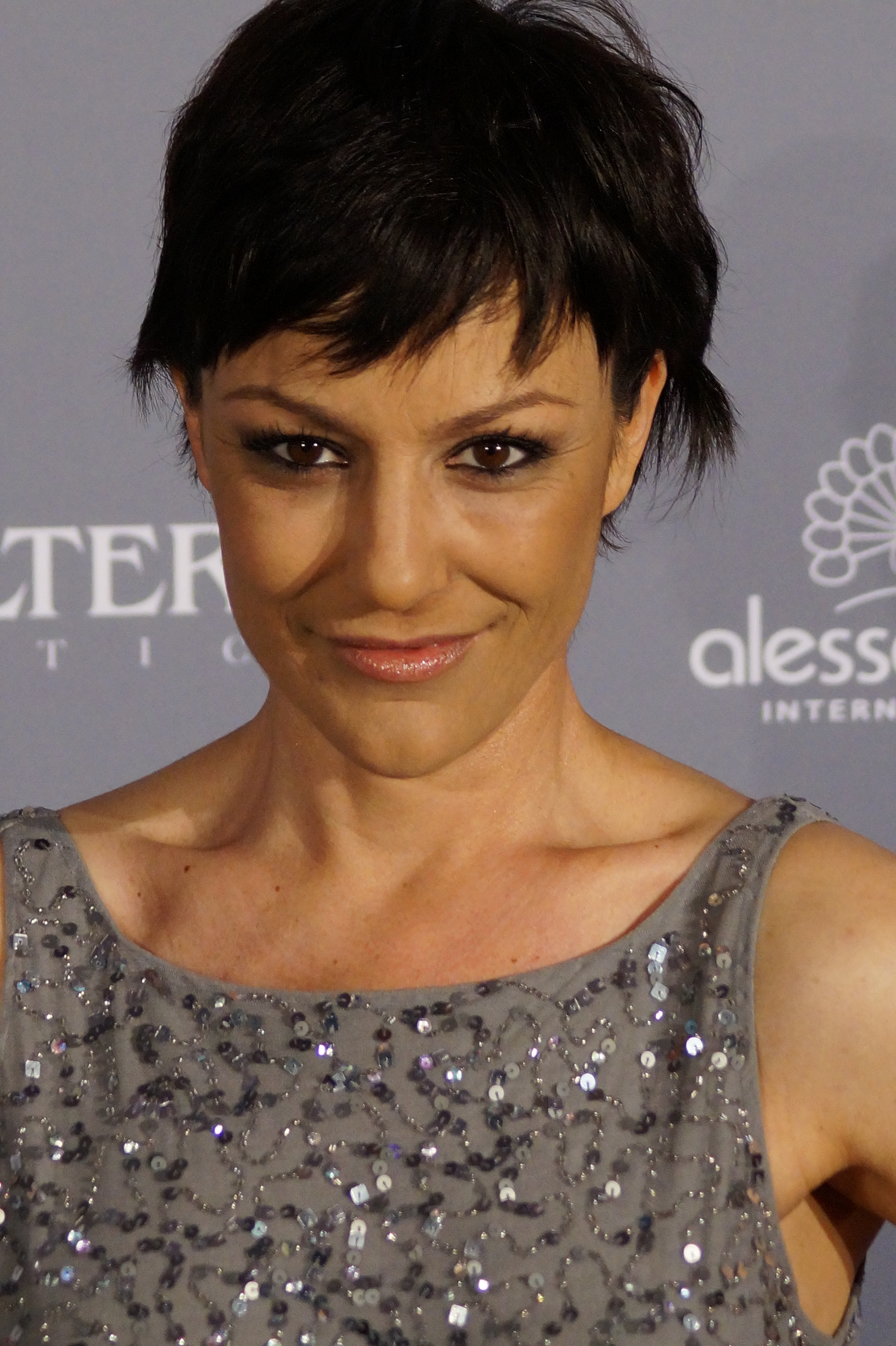
- Pielhau in 2015
- Born: 12 May 1975; Heidelberg, Baden-Württemberg, West Germany
- Died: 12 July 2016 (aged 41); Berlin, Germany
- Occupations: television presenter; radio presenter; author; actress
- Spouse: Thomas Hanreich
- Children: 1

Miriam Pielhau (12 May 1975 – 12 July 2016) was a German television and radio presenter, author and actress.

== Early life ==
Pielhau was born to an Iranian father and a German mother, in Heidelberg. She moved with her parents to Bad Berleburg in 1988. In 1994, she graduated from the Johannes-Althusius-Gymnasium there and studied German and English for four semesters at the University of Siegen. However, she broke off this course and worked as a freelancer for various daily newspapers. From 1984 to 1998, she took dance lessons and from 1998 to 2002, she also took singing and acting lessons.

== Personal life ==
On 27 March 2003, Pielhau married Thomas Hanreich, the former singer of the group Vivid. Since she was in Khao Lak, Thailand at the time of the 2004 tsunami disaster and survived it during a diving excursion, she got involved in the Hanseatic School for Life project there, which offers orphans a future perspective. In May 2012, she had a daughter who has lived with her father since Pielhaus' death in 2016. Pielhaus separated from her husband in June 2013.

== Illness and death ==
In Spring 2008, Pielhau was diagnosed with breast cancer. She described her experience with the disease in her book Fremdkörper. In February 2016, she had seemingly defeated the cancer again. She described her second fight against cancer in her book Dr. Hoffnung (Dr. Hope). The following month, however, it was announced that she had been diagnosed with breast cancer again.

Pielhau died on 12 July 2016 at the age of 41 from complications from breast cancer in Berlin. For several years she supported the German Cancer Aid in the fight against cancer. The organization recognized her achievements in educating cancer patients; Gerd Nettekoven, chairman of the Board of Directors of Deutsche Krebshilfe, announced on 14 July that "Miriam Pielhau has encouraged and given hope to many people affected in the fight against cancer. We admired that very much."

== Filmography ==
- 1998–2001: GIGA
- 1999: Eins Live TV
- 2002–2005: taff
- 2002: Mission Germany (presenter)
- 2005–2006: Weck Up
- 2005: Top 10 TV – Die größten TV-Stars
- 2005–2007: Cinema TV (2007 under the title Wir lieben Kino – Das Magazin)
- 2007: American Football Showtime
- 2008–2009: Big Brother
- 2009: Baustelle Liebe
- 2010: Dresdner Opernball (presenter)
- 2010: ... ins Grüne! Das Stadt-Land-Lust-Magazin
- 2011: Bambi hilft Kindern (presenter)
- 2011: Verbotene Liebe (guest)
- 2011: Großstadtliebe
- 2013: Hubert und Staller – Die ins Gras beißen
