= 2016 Düsseldorf terrorism plot =

Reported ISIL terror plot in Germany

- Location: Düsseldorf, Germany
- Date: Suspects arrested on June 2, 2016
- Attack type: Bombings and shootings
- Perpetrator: 4
- Motive: Islamic terrorism

The 2016 Düsseldorf terrorism plot was a reported plot by the Islamic State of Iraq and the Levant (ISIL) to carry out a series of bombings and shootings in multiple sections of the German city of Düsseldorf similar to those carried out in Paris in November 2015. The plot was foiled after one of the conspirators, Saleh A., 25, turned himself in to authorities in France in February 2016. He told authorities he was aware of Islamic State's "sleeper cell" in Germany preparing to carry out murders in Germany. Saleh A. was questioned several times by anti-terror experts and subsequently charged with cooperating with terrorist organization and detained. This led to arrests of three of the members of the conspiracy on 2 June, following several months of further investigation.

== Plot ==
The plot involved up to 10 conspirators travelling from Syria to engage in a series of suicide bombings and mass shootings in central Düsseldorf. Explosives were planned to be detonated on the main road near the Stadtbahn station, while armed attackers would have carried out killings with weapons and more explosives. Attacks were to be carried out on the Heinrich-Heine-Allee street and in the Altstadt district of the city.

== Suspects ==
Three of the suspects were registered as refugees and lived in migrants' residences around Germany, which fueled the debate over Germany's policy during the European migrant crisis. The man arrested in France, Saleh A., and the suspect arrested in Wriezen, Brandenburg, Hamza C., travelled to Turkey together in May 2014, then traveled separately to Greece and north through Europe 2014 and entered Germany via the Balkan route in 2015. An explosives expert, Abd Arahman A.K., who had received training in explosives while in Syria, was arrested in Leimen, Baden-Württemberg, travelled to Germany in October 2014 via the Balkans. The fourth suspect, Mahood B., resided in Mühlheim, Germany before he was convinced by Saleh A. and Hamza C. to participate in the plot.

== See also ==
- 2016 Chemnitz terrorism plot
- 2016 Ludwigshafen bombing plot
- Immigration and crime in Germany
- Islamic terrorism in Europe
