= Erika Berger =

German television presenter and author

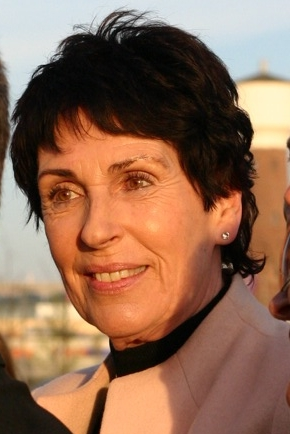
- Berger in 2007
- Born: Erika Berger; August 13, 1939; Germany
- Died: May 15, 2016 (aged 76)
- Occupations: television presenter, author
- Known for: RTL Television

Erika Berger (August 13, 1939 – May 15, 2016) was a German television presenter and author.

== Life ==
Berger worked as a television presenter on German television broadcaster RTL. As a writer she wrote several books on sexuality. Berger had two children.

== Works by Berger ==
- Der Bett-Knigge: vom Umgang mit dem geliebten anderen Geschlecht, Heyne, Munich 1986, ISBN 978-3-453-02368-0.
- Was Sie schon immer über Liebe wissen wollten: Ein Handbuch für die glückliche Partnerschaft Heyne, Munich 1987, ISBN 978-3-453-02432-8.
- Die neue Zärtlichkeit: Liebe ohne Angst Heyne, Munich 1988, ISBN 978-3-453-00701-7.
- Eine Chance für die Liebe: das Buch zur Fernsehsendung, Goldmann, Munich 1989, ISBN 3-442-09686-3.
- Körpersprache der Erotik, Heyne, Munich 1993, ISBN 978-3-7205-1609-9.
- Power mit 50: der Weg zu einem neuen Lebensgefühl, Lübbe, Bergisch Gladbach 1994.
- Lust statt Frust: meine Wohlfühlformeln mvgVerlag, 2007.
- Spätes Glück: Liebe, Sex und Leidenschaft in reifen Jahren mvgVerlag, 2008, ISBN 978-3-636-06359-5.
- Langenscheidt, Sex-Deutsch, Deutsch-Sex Langenscheidt, 2009, ISBN 978-3-468-73222-5.
