= 2016 Chemnitz terrorism plot =

Suspected terrorist bombing plot

- Location: Chemnitz, Germany
- Date: 8 October 2016
- Attack type: Bombing plot
- Deaths: 0
- Injuries: 0
- No. of participants: 3 suspects

The 2016 Chemnitz terrorism plot was a suspected terrorist bombing plot which became known to the public on 8 October 2016 in Chemnitz, Saxony, Germany. It was reportedly planned by the 22-year-old Syrian man Jaber al-Bakr.

== Events ==
A part of the Kappel district, a housing development in Chemnitz, where Khalil A., a possible accomplice of al-Bakr, had rented a flat, was put on lockdown as the police tried to arrest al-Bakr, but failed to do so, reportedly when he hastily left the apartment block on foot.

During the searches of al-Bakr's friend's flat, the police found "highly-volatile explosives", which were said to be more dangerous than TNT. Al-Bakr, who was described by the police as possibly "dangerous" and probably acting under Islamistic motivation, was on the loose until he was caught in Leipzig on early morning of 10 October. Three further suspects were initially detained. Chemnitz main station was partially on lockdown for four hours as well, as a red suitcase which belonged to two of the detained suspects was under investigation. After the suitcase was found to contain no explosives, the station was re-opened during the night.

Al-Bakr allegedly planned an attack on a German airport. Therefore, also Berlin police was on high alert, more forces were deployed to the airports Berlin Tegel and Berlin Schönefeld. The police spoke of "preventive measures", but also stated it was on "maximum" alert anyway since terrorist attacks in Paris. Security was also tightened at other airports and stations in Germany. The manhunt was under way nationwide the next day, with police stating there was "no new state of the investigation", but it had received more than 80 useful hints. Meanwhile, the local police forces had to deal with several upset reactions by citizens. Subsequently, they published a warning to the public via their Twitter account saying that 'small-minded people spreading anger and pointless news are acting disrespectful considering the situation in Chemnitz'.

According to terror expert Elmar Theveßen of German public ZDF broadcaster, the found explosive was TATP, which were also used in the November 2015 Paris attacks and the 2016 Brussels bombings.

== Suspects ==
The 22-year old Jaber al-Bakr, also spelled Albakr, born 10 January 1994 in Sa'sa' near Damascus, Syria, arrived as a refugee in Germany in 2015 according to French AFP agency whilst local newspapers report that he wasn't with the Landeskriminalamt contradicting the latter. His arrest was ordered after the Federal Office for the Protection of the Constitution gathered information about him during a long-time observation. Three other suspects with links to al-Bakr were detained, two of them at Chemnitz main station and one in the flat where al-Bakr lived. Two of them were freed the next morning. One, who was later identified as Khalil A., remained in custody as a possible accomplice. al-Bakr was later found dead after committing suicide in his prison cell in Leipzig, Germany.

On 9 October 2016 another suspect was arrested in the so-called Yorck area of Chemnitz. He was alleged to have been in contact with al-Bakr.

Al-Bakr was arrested in Paunsdorf, Leipzig on early 10 October. He had asked another Syrian man for a bed for the night at Leipzig main station, who didn't know initially who Al-Bakr was and took him to his flat. But Al-Bakr was recognized by the housemates of his host, who tied him up and went to the police. Landeskriminalamt Sachsen (State criminal office Saxony) confirmed that Al-Bakr had links to the IS.

While in custody, Al-Bakr reportedly went into hunger strike and, according to his lawyer broke several lamps and manipulated electrical outlets. Because of the fear he might commit suicide he was under constant surveillance, which means that the guards looked after him in certain intervals of 15 min and later 30 min. Nonetheless, he was found hanging in his prison cell on 12 October.

== See also ==
- Immigration and crime in Germany
- 2016 Düsseldorf terrorism plot
- 2016 Ludwigshafen bombing plot
