= Charlotte (given name) =

- Gender: Female

Origin
- Origin: French, Italian
- Meaning: "strong and virile", "vigorous"

Other names
- Nicknames: Charlie, Lotta, Chara, Lottie, Lotte, Carly, Chazzo
- Related names: Charles, Charlene, Carol, Caroline, Karlotta, Séarlait, Carlota, Carlotta

Charlotte is a feminine given name. It is a female form of the male name Charles. It is of French or Italian origin, meaning "free man" or "petite". It dates back to at least the 14th century.

== Popularity ==
Charlotte was the most popular name for girls in Australia in 2013.

In 2015, it was the 21st most popular girl name both in England and Wales, having been a constant presence among the top ten girls' names there since the 1980s.

In 2022, in the United States, the name Charlotte was given to 12,891 girls, ranking it as the third most popular name. It was also the third most popular name given to girls in Canada that year.

== Notable people ==
=== Royalty ===
The following women are usually identified as Charlotte with an appended title rather than a surname:

- Charlotte of Belgium (1840–1927), Empress of Mexico
- Charlotte, Grand Duchess of Luxembourg (1896–1985; r. 1919–1964)
- Charlotte de Bourbon, Duchess of Segovia (1919–1979), second wife of Infante Jaime, Duke of Segovia
- Archduchess Charlotte of Austria (1921–1989), Duchess of Mecklenburg-Strelitz
- Princess Charlotte (disambiguation), various princesses
  - Princess Charlotte of Wales (born 2015), granddaughter of Charles III, King of the United Kingdom, and only daughter of William, Prince of Wales
- Queen Charlotte (disambiguation), various queens
  - Charlotte of Mecklenburg-Strelitz (1744–1818), Queen of the United Kingdom

=== Other people ===
- Charlotte Aagaard (born 1977), Danish tennis player
- Charlotte Abramow (born 1993), Belgian photographer and filmmaker
- Charlotte Adams (mountain climber) (1859–1920), Australian mountain climber
- Charlotte Adams (writer) (1793–1873), British novelist
- Charlotte Adigéry (born 1990), Belgian musician
- Charlotte Afriat (born 2002), Monegasque sprinter
- Charlotte Agell (born 1959), Swedish-born American author
- Charlotte von Ahlefeld (1781–1849), German novelist
- Charlotte Aiken (born 1992), English ice dancer
- Charlotte Ainslie (1863–1960), Scottish educationist and headmistress
- Charlotte Aïssé (1693–1733), French letter writer
- Charlotte Akervik (born 2001), American ice hockey player
- Charlotte Alexandra (born 1954), English actress
- Charlotte Baldwin Allen (1805–1895), Wife of a co-founder of Houston, Texas
- Charlotte Ander (1902–1969), German actress
- Charlotte Anderson (1915–2002), Australian scientist, physician and academic
- Charlotte Jones Anderson (born 1966), American football executive
- Charlotte Paget, Marchioness of Anglesey (1780–1853), British noblewoman
- Charlotte Angus (1911–1989), American painter
- Charlotte Anley (1796–1893), English didactic novelist and writer
- Charlotte Anneveld (born 1982), Australian cricketer
- Charlotte Bolles Anthony (1841–1877), American women's rights activist and suffragist
- Charlotte Antonsen (born 1959), Danish politician
- Charlotte Hunter Arley (1912–2006), American lawyer
- Charlotte Armstrong (1905–1969), American writer
- Charlotte Armstrong (baseball) (1924–2008), American baseball player
- Charlotte Arnold (born 1989), Canadian actress
- Charlotte Arrowsmith, British actress
- Charlotte Arter (born 1991), Welsh runner
- Charlotte Ashburnham, Countess of Ashburnham (1766–1862), English aristocrat
- Charlotte Ashton, British television presenter
- Charlotte Murray, Duchess of Atholl (1731–1805), Scottish peeress
- Charlotte Atkins (born 1950), British Labour Party politician
- Charlotte Atkinson (swimmer) (born 1996), British swimmer
- Charlotte Waring Atkinson (1796–1867), Australian writer
- Charlotte Atkyns (1757–1836), British actress and spy
- Charlotte Attenborough (born 1959), English actress
- Charlotte Aubin (born 1991), Canadian actress from Quebec
- Charlotte Auerbach (1899–1994), German geneticist
- Charlotte Austin (born 1933), American actress
- Charlotte Austin (Thai actress) (born 1998), Thai-British actress
- Charlotte Elizabeth Austin (1878–1933), Australian community leader
- Charlotte Avery, British actress
- Charlotte Awbery (born 1989), English singer-songwriter
- Charlotte Ayanna (born 1976), Miss Teen USA 1993
- Charlotte Bach (1920–1981), Hungarian-British impostor and fringe evolutionary theorist
- Charlotte Caroline Wilhelmine Bachmann (1757–1817), German singer, harpsichordist and composer
- Charlotte Bacon (author), American author and educator
- Charlotte Baden (1740–1824), Danish writer, feminist and letter-writer
- Charlotte Badger (1778–1818?), Australian pirate
- Charlotte Lily Baidoo, Ghanaian banker and the chief executive officer
- Charlotte Alice Baker (1833–1909), American historian, journalist, and teacher
- Charlotte Johnson Baker (1855–1937), American physician
- Charlotte Baldwin (1778–1856), American actress
- Charlotte Fowler Baldwin (1805–1873), American missionary
- Charlotte Lee, Lady Baltimore (1678–1721), English noblewoman
- Charlotte Bankes (born 1995), British snowboarder
- Charlotte Bardsley (born 2002), English table tennis player
- Charlotte Barker (born 1962), British actress
- Charlotte Alington Barnard (1830–1869), British composer and hymnwriter
- Charlotte Mary Sanford Barnes (1818–1863), American actress and playwright
- Charlotte Barnum (1860–1934), Mathematician and social activist
- Charlotte Barras (born 1982), English rugby union player
- Charlotte Bascombe (born 1987), Scottish cricketer
- Charlotte Fiske Bates (1838–1916), American writer
- Charlotte Bathe (born 1965), British equestrian
- Charlotte Elizabeth Battles (1864–1952), American bank president
- Charlotte Sophia Somerset, Duchess of Beaufort (1771–1854), Wife of the 6th Duke of Beaufort
- Charlotte Beaumont (born 1995), English actress
- Charlotte Becker (born 1983), German racing cyclist
- Charlotte Beddows (1887–1976), Scottish golfer and hockey player
- Charlotte Beers (born 1935), American businesswoman
- Charlotte Beggs (born 2002), Irish field hockey player
- Charlotte of Belgium (1840–1927), Empress of Mexico from 1864 to 1867
- Charlotte Bellamy (born 1973), English actress
- Charlotte Bellis, New Zealand journalist
- Charlotte Bentley (1915–1996), British nurse and nursing activist
- Charlotte Béquignon-Lagarde (1900–1993), French magistrate and jurist
- Charlotte Beradt (1907–1986), German writer and journalist
- Charlotte Berend-Corinth (1880–1967), German painter
- Charlotte Bergman (1903–2002), Art collector and philanthropist
- Charlotte Bernard (born 1972), French snowboarder
- Charlotte de Berry (1636–1689), Pirate
- Charlotte Bertrand, American government official
- Charlotte Best (born 1994), Australian actress and model
- Charlotte Best (athlete) (born 1985), English middle-distance runner
- Charlotte Bilbault (born 1990), French footballer
- Charlotte Bill (1875–1964), Nanny to the children of King George V and Queen Mary
- Charlotte Bingham (1942–2025), English novelist
- Charlotte Bingham (field hockey) (born 2005), English field hockey player
- Charlotte Birch-Pfeiffer (1800–1868), German actress and writer
- Charlotte Biron (born 1990), Canadian writer and teacher
- Charlotte Bischoff (1901–1994), German Communist and Resistance fighter
- Charlotte Blacklock (1857–1931), British suffragette
- Charlotte Blair (born 2004), Australian rules footballer
- Charlotte Blake (1885–1979), American composer
- Charlotte Blease, Northern Irish philosopher of medicine
- Charlotte Lady Blennerhassett (1843–1917), German writer and biographer
- Charlotte Blindheim (1917–2005), Norwegian archaeologist
- Charlotte Boisjoli (1923–2001), Canadian actress, director, writer and educator
- Charlotte Bolland, English art historian
- Charlotte Bolton (born 2003), Canadian para athletics competitor
- Charlotte Selina Bompas (1830–1917), British memorist and novelist
- Charlotte Le Bon (born 1986), Canadian actress and director
- Charlotte Bonaparte (1802–1839), Infanta of Spain
- Charlotte Pence Bond (born 1993), American writer
- Charlotte Bonin (born 1987), Italian professional triathlete
- Charlotte Bonnet (born 1995), French swimmer
- Charlotte Booth (born 1975), British archaeologist and egyptologist
- Charlotte Booth (gymnast), British artistic gymnast
- Charlotte Booth (rower) (born 1985), British rower
- Charlotte of Bourbon (1546–1582), Princess consort of Orange
- Charlotte Bourette (1714–1784), French poet and lemonadier
- Charlotte Bournonville (1832–1911), Danish opera singer and actress
- Charlotte Bøving (actress) (born 1964), Danish actor and theatre director
- Charlotte Bøving (doctor) (born 1967), Danish doctor and television presenter
- Charlotte Boyle (swimmer) (1899–1990), American swimmer
- Charlotte Bradford (1813–1893), Nurse during the American Civil War
- Charlotte Bradley, Irish stage and film actress
- Charlotte Bradley (runner) (born 1952), Mexican middle-distance runner
- Charlotte Mary Brame (1836–1884), British novelist
- Charlotte von Brandenstein (1754–1805), German composer
- Charlotte Wilhelmina Franziska Brandes (1765–1788), German singer, pianist, actress and composer
- Charlotte Brändström (born 1959), Swedish-French film director
- Charlotte Bravard (born 1992), French cyclist
- Charlotte Bray (born 1982), British composer
- Charlotte Bredahl (born 1957), American equestrian
- Charlotte Brent (1735–1802), English operatic soprano
- Charlotte Brew, British equestrian
- Charlotte Brewer (born 1956), English medievalist and literary scholar
- Charlotte de Brézé (1446–1477), Illegitimate daughter of Charles VII of France
- Charlotte Bridgwood (1861–1929), Canadian vaudeville performer and inventor
- Charlotte Britz (born 1958), German politician
- Charlotte Broberg (born 1969), Swedish politician
- Charlotte Brontë (1816–1855), English novelist and poet
- Charlotte Hood, 3rd Duchess of Bronte (1787–1873), British noble
- Charlotte Brooke (1740–1793), Irish writer
- Charlotte Brooks (1918–2014), American photographer and photojournalist
- Charlotte Brown (producer) (born 1943), American screenwriter and producer
- Charlotte Blake Brown (1846–1904), American physician
- Charlotte Emerson Brown (1838–1895), American clubwoman
- Charlotte Hawkins Brown (1883–1961), American educator
- Charlotte L. Brown, American educator and civil rights activist
- Charlotte Brun (born 1976), French politician
- Charlotte H. Bruner (1917–1999), American scholar
- Charlotte Brunsdon (born 1952), British professor
- Charlotte Christine of Brunswick-Wolfenbüttel (1694–1715), Tsarevna of Russia
- Charlotte Bryant (1903–1936), accused murderer
- Charlotte Buck (born 1995), American rower
- Charlotte Buff (1753–1828), Model of Goethe's "Lotte"
- Charlotte Bühler (1893–1974), German-American psychologist
- Charlotte Christine Buissine (1749–1801), Mistress of German royalty
- Charlotte Bunch (born 1944), American author and activist
- Charlotte Burbury (1832–1895), British educationist
- Charlotte Burge (born 2006), American soccer player
- Charlotte Burgess (born 1987), British archer
- Charlotte Burks (born 1942), American politician
- Charlotte Sophia Burne (1850–1923), English author, editor and folklorist
- Charlotte Burrows, American politician
- Charlotte Burton (1881–1942), American actress
- Charlotte Butler, English actress
- Charlotte Caffey (born 1953), American musician
- Charlotte Carew Pole, British political activist
- Charlotte Casiraghi (born 1986), Monégasque socialite
- Charlotte Church (born 1986), Welsh musician
- Charlotte Clarke, Scottish academic
- Charlotte Clasis (1891–1974), French actress
- Charlotte Clements (born 1979), English ice dancer
- Charlotte Clymer (born 1986), American activist
- Charlotte Colbert (born 1987), Franco-British multi-media artist
- Charlotte Coleman (1968–2001), English actress
- Charlotte Coles, British oncologist and professor
- Charlotte Reeve Conover (1855–1940), American author, lecturer, and political activist
- Charlotte Corday (1768–1793), French revolutionary and assassin
- Charlotte Cornwell (1949–2021), English actress
- Charlotte Crivelli (1863–1956), French Australian philanthropist
- Charlotte F. Dailey (1842–1914), American editor and exposition official
- Charlotte d'Amboise (born 1964), American actress and dancer
- Charlotte Daffé, Guinean politician
- Charlotte Dawson (1966–2014), New Zealander-Australian television personality
- Charlotte de Sauve (1551–1617), French noblewoman, courtesan and spy
- Charlotte de Witte (born 1992), Belgian DJ and record producer
- Charlotte "Lottie" Dod (1871–1960), English tennis player
- Charlotte Dravet (1936–2025), French paediatric psychiatrist and epileptologist
- Charlotte Dujardin (born 1985), British equestrian and writer
- Charlotte Edwards (born 1979), English cricketer
- Charlotte Egerton, Countess of Bridgewater (1763–1849), British noblewoman
- Charlotte Elliott (1789–1871), English poet and hymnwriter
- Charlotte Famin (born 1973), French wheelchair tennis player
- Charlotte Flair (born 1986), American professional wrestler
- Charlotte Forten Grimké (1837–1914), American anti-slavery activist and educator
- Charlotte Frank (born 1959), German architect
- Charlotte Fullerton, American television writer and author
- Charlotte Gainsbourg (born 1971), British-French actress and singer
- Charlotte Evelyn Gay (1867–1958), English social and temperance reformer
- Charlotte Duncan Smith Graham (1912–1993), American labor organizer
- Charlotte Grant (born 2001), Australian footballer
- Charlotte A. Gray (1844–1912), English educator and temperance leader
- Charlotte E. Gray (1873–1926), American novelist and religious writer
- Charlotte Greenwood (1890–1977), American actress and dancer
- Charlotte Bagge Hansen (born 1969), Danish politician
- Charlotte Harris (born 1981), British painter
- Charlotte Hatherley (born 1979), English musician
- Charlotte Hawkins Brown (1883–1961), American educator
- Charlotte Henshaw (born 1987), British Paralympic swimmer
- Charlotte Hope, English actress
- Charlotte Iliffe, Baroness Iliffe (1881–1972), British aristocrat, philanthropist and suffragist
- Charlotte Jackson (born 1978), English television presenter and journalist
- Charlotte A. Jerauld (1820–1845), American poet
- Charlotte Johnson Wahl (1942–2021), British artist and mother of Boris Johnson
- Charlotte Jordan (born 1995), English actress
- Charlotte Kalla (born 1987), Swedish cross-country skier
- Charlotte Kennedy (born 1994), English actress
- Charlotte Lawlor (1878–1941), New Zealand poet, writer and advertising designer
- Charlotte Laws (born 1960), American activist
- Charlotte Lecocq (born 1977), French politician
- Charlotte Lee (artist manager), founder of Primo Artists
- Charlotte Lee, Countess of Lichfield (1664–1718), illegitimate daughter of Charles II
- Charlotte Lennox (c. 1729–1804), English author and poet
- Charlotte Lennox, Duchess of Richmond (1768–1842), British aristocrat
- Charlotte Lewis (born 1967), English actress
- Charlotte Martin (born 1976), American musician
- Charlotte Maxeke (1871–1939), South African social and political activist
- Charlotte McConaghy, Australian novelist and screenwriter
- Charlotte McKinney (born 1993), American model and actress
- Charlotte Montagu-Douglas-Scott, Duchess of Buccleuch (1811–1895), British peeress
- Charlotte P. Morris, American academic administrator
- Charlotte Nichols (born 1991), British politician
- Charlotte Nordström (born 1963), Swedish politician
- Charlotte Paston, Countess of Yarmouth (1650–1684), illegitimate daughter of Charles II of England
- Charlotte Payne (born 2002), British hammer thrower
- Charlotte le Pelletier (1778–1855), French musician and composer
- Charlotte Perkins Gilman (1860–1935), American writer and socialist
- Charlotte Perriand (1903–1999), French architect and designer
- Charlotte Pistorius (1777–1850), German poet
- Charlotte Plank, Australian singer and songwriter
- Charlotte Prodger (born 1974), British video artist
- Charlotte Proudman (born 1988), British barrister and writer
- Charlotte Rae (1926–2018), American actress and singer
- Charlotte Rampling (born 1946), English actress
- Charlotte E. Ray (1850–1911), attorney and teacher; first African-American woman to become a lawyer
- Charlotte Read (1929–2019), American environmental activist
- Charlotte Regan (born 1993–1994), British director
- Charlotte Rhead (1885–1947), English ceramics artist
- Charlotte Riley (born 1981), English actress
- Charlotte Roche (born 1978), British-German author and television presenter
- Charlotte Sannom (1846–1923), Danish painter, writer, and missionary
- Charlotte Salomon (1917–1943), German artist
- Charlotte Schreiber (1834–1922), Canadian artist and illustrator
- Charlotte Scott (1858–1931), British mathematician
- Charlotte Sheffield (1936–2016), American actress, model and beauty pageant titleholder
- Charlotte Simoneau (born 2005), Canadian weightlifter
- Charlotte Amalie Skeel (1700–1763), Danish noble
- Charlotte Smith (disambiguation), various people
- Charlotte Stoker (1818–1901), activist and mother of Bram Stoker
- Charlotte Stuart, Duchess of Albany (1753–1789), illegitimate daughter of Charles Edward Stuart
- Charlotte De Bernier Taylor (1806–1865), American entomologist
- Charlotte Teske (born 1949), German athlete
- Charlotte Tilbury (born 1973), British make-up artist
- Charlotte Uhlenbroek (born 1967), British zoologist and television presenter
- Charlotte Vandermeersch (born 1983), Belgian actress
- Charlotte Wahl (1817–1899), Latvian philanthropist
- Charlotte Walker, American actress
- Charlotte Walker (politician) (born 2004), Australian politician
- Charlotte Wassef (1912–1988), Egyptian model
- Charley Webb (born 1988), English actress
- Lady Charlotte Wellesley (born 1990), British socialite
- Charlotte Fowler Wells (1814–1901), American phrenologist and publisher
- Charlotte Wells (born 1987), Scottish film director
- Charlotte Wessels (born 1987), Dutch singer-songwriter
- Charlotte Frances Wilder (1839–1916), American writer
- Charlotte S. Winchell (1836-1926), American civic leader
- Charlotte Seymour Yapp (1879–1934), British nurse

== Fictional characters ==
- Charlotte (Charlotte's Web), a barn spider from the 1952 children's novel Charlotte's Web
- Charlotte Drake, a former antagonist in Pretty Little Liars
- Charlotte King, a character in the TV series Private Practice
- Charlotte Lewis (Lost), a secondary character in the 2004 TV series Lost
- Charlotte York, a main character in Sex and the City
- Charlie Morningstar, the principal character of the adult animation series Hazbin Hotel

== See also ==
- Charlotte (disambiguation)
- Charlotta
- Sharlotte Lucas
