= Lilo =

Lilo or LILO may refer to:

== People ==
- Lilo (name), a list of people with the nickname or surname
- Lilo (footballer, 1902-1972), Manuel Rodríguez Pazó, Spanish football goalkeeper
- Lilo (footballer, born 1983), Murilo Rufino Barbosa, Brazilian football midfielder
- Lilo (actress), stage name of Liselotte Johanna Lewin (1921-2022), German-born French singer and actress

== LILO ==
- LILO (bootloader), a bootloader for Linux systems
- Last in, last out, or first in, first out in queues
- Left-in/left-out, a roadway intersection
- Linzer Lokalbahn, a railway line in upper austria going from and to Linz.

== Other uses ==
- Lilo Pelekai, a titular character in the 2002 Disney film Lilo & Stitch and its franchise
- Air mattress or lilo, from the trademark Li-Lo
- "The Lilo", short story by Stanislaw Lem first translated in Lemistry
- Lilo (restaurant), a Michelin-starred restaurant in Carlsbad, California

== See also ==
- Didi Lilo, a village near Tbilisi, Georgia
- Lillo (disambiguation)
- Liloy, Zamboanga del Norte, Philippines
