= Lotta =

Lotta may refer to:

- Lotta (name), a diminutive name of Charlotte and Charlotta
- Lotta (river), a river in northern Finland and Murmansk Oblast, Russia

== Other ==
- Lotta Svärd, Finnish paramilitary organization of World War II
- Lotta Svärd (poem), epic poem
- Lotta Continua Italian paramilitary organization
- Lotta Comunista, Italian political party
- Lake Lotta, American lake
- Lotta in Love, 2006 telenovela
- "Lotta på Liseberg", Swedish sing-a-long

== See also ==
- Lota (name)
- Latta (disambiguation)
- Litta (disambiguation)
- Lotha (disambiguation)
- Losta (disambiguation)
- Lota (disambiguation)
- Lott (disambiguation)
- Lotte (disambiguation)
- Lotto (disambiguation)
- Lotts (disambiguation)
- Lotti (given name)
- Lotty
