= Lotty =

Lotty is an English feminine given name that is a diminutive form of Charlotte or Lieselotte, an alternate form of Lotte, and that is also related to Lisa, Elisa and Elisabeth. Notable people with the name include the following:

== Given name ==
- Lotty Ipinza (born 1953), Venezuelan poet and singer

== Nickname ==
- Lotty Hough, real name Charlotte Hough (c. 1833–1896), American actress and comedian
- Lotty Rosenfeld, full name Carlota Eugenia Rosenfeld Villarreal (1943–2020), Chilean artist

== Surname ==
- Alan Lotty (1920 – 1973), Irish hurler

== See also ==
- Letty (disambiguation)
- Lofty (disambiguation)
- Lott (disambiguation)
- Lotta (name)
- Lotte (name)
- Lotti (given name)
- Lotto (disambiguation)
