= Girard School District =

School district in Pennsylvania

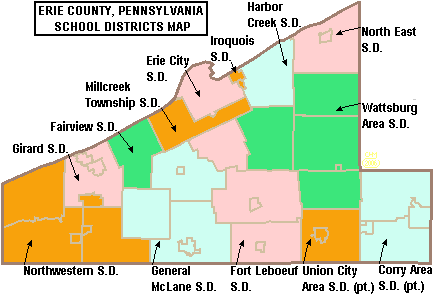

Location
- Erie, Pennsylvania; United States

District information
- Type: Public
- Motto: "Excellence in Education"

Students and staff
- District mascot: Yellowjacket
- Colors: Red and gold

Other information
- Website: www.girardsd.org

Girard School District is a public school district serving parts of Erie County, Pennsylvania. It encompasses the communities of Girard, Girard Township, and Lake City. It contains three schools: Elk Valley Elementary School, Rice Avenue Middle School, and Girard High School.

== Notable alumni ==
- Marc Blucas - Actor, Buffy the Vampire Slayer and more. Girard High School class of 1990.
- Brigadier General David K. MacEwen - 59th adjutant general of the United States Army, executive director of the Military Postal Service Agency. Girard High School class of 1978.
