= Losta (disambiguation) =

Losta is a river in Vologodsky District, Vologda Oblast, Russia.

Losta may also refer to:

- Losta railway station, a railway station in Vologda, Russia
- Losta, a district in Vologda

== See also ==
- Lotta (disambiguation)
- Lasta (disambiguation)
