= Lottie (name) =

Lottie is an English feminine given name that is a diminutive form of Charlotte, Lieselotte, or Ottilie. It is an alternate form of Lotte, and that is also related to Lisa, Elisa and Elisabeth. Notable people with the name include the following:

== Given name ==
- Lottie Beck (1929–2010), American female baseball player
- Lottie Beebe (born 1953), American educator
- Lottie Blackford (1881–1973), British actress
- Lottie Isbell Blake (1876–1976), African-American physician, medical missionary, and educator
- Lottie Briscoe (1883–1950), American actress
- Lottie Gee (1886–1973), American entertainer
- Lottie Estelle Granger (1858–1934), American educator
- Lottie Kimbrough (c.1900–?), American country blues singer
- Lottie Moggach, English journalist and author
- Lottie Mooney (1902–1982), American artist
- Lottie Mwale (1952–2005), Zambian boxer
- Lottie Holman O'Neill (1878–1967), American politician
- Lottie Phiri (born 1988), Zambian footballer
- Lottie Randolph (1886 or 1887–1968), American agriculturist
- Lottie Louise Riekehof (1920–2020), American Sign Language interpreter
- Lottie Ryan (born 1985), Irish TV presenter, radio reporter and dancer
- Lottie Shackelford (born 1941), American politician
- Lottie Queen Stamper (1907–1987), American Cherokee basket weaver and educator
- Lottie Gertrude Stevenson, née Bevier, known as Trudy Stevenson (1944–2018), Zimbabwean ambassador and politician
- Lottie Williams, actress born 1866 (1866–1929), American actress
- Lottie Williams, actress born 1874 (1874–1962), American actress

== Nickname ==
- Lottie Alter, American actress Charlotte Alice Alter (1871–1924)
- Clotilde Elizabeth Brielmaier (1867–1915), American painter
- Charlotte Lottie Collins (1865–1910), English singer and dancer
- Charlotte Lottie Dod (1871–1960), English multi-sport athlete, particularly in tennis
- Gunhild Lottie Ejebrant (born 1944), Swedish actress
- Charlotte Lottie Wilson Jackson (1854–1914), American artist
- Charlotte Lottie Moon (1840–1912), American Southern Baptist missionary to China
- Cynthia Charlotte Moon (1828–1895) Confederate American Civil War spy
- Charlotte "Lottie" Rollin, African-American Reconstruction-era civil rights activist - see The Rollin Sisters
- Helga Liselott Lottie Tham (born 1949), Swedish heiress and businesswoman
- Lottie 'The Body' Graves Claiborne (1930–2020), African-American burlesque dancer
- Hannah Charlotte Lottie Venne (1852–1928), British comedian, actress and singer

== Fictional characters ==
- Lottie, in the British television series The Duchess of Duke Street
- Lottie, an otter character from the Animal Crossing franchise
- Lottie Biggs, protagonist of a teen novel eponymous series written by Hayley Long
- Lottie Brooks, in the series by Katie Kirby, a 11/12-year-old girl
- Lottie Chandler, nickname for Charlotte Chandler, All My Children character
- Lottie Horn (Lotte Körner in the German language original), character from Erich Kästner's novel Lottie and Lisa
- Charlotte "Lottie" Matthews. one of the teen plane crash survivors in the TV series Yellowjackets
- Lottie Ryan, character from the Australian soap opera Home and Away
- Lottie the Otter, in the Winnie the Pooh novel Return to the Hundred Acre Wood
- Lottie, a character created by the protagonist of The Lottie Project, a 1997 children's novel by Jacqueline Wilson

== See also ==
- Lottie (disambiguation)
- Lotte (name)
- Lotti (given name)
