= Liselott =

Liselott is a given name. Notable people with the name include:

- Liselott Blixt (born 1965), Swedish-Danish politician, member of the Folketing for the Danish People's Party
- Liselott Hagberg (born 1958), Swedish Liberal politician, member of the Riksdag between 2002 and 2012
- Liselott Kahn (1921–2013), German-American poet and scholar of psychology and German studies
- Liselott Linsenhoff (1927–1999), German equestrian and Olympic champion
- Liselott Lotass (born 1964), Swedish writer
- Helga Liselott Lottie Tham (born 1949), Swedish heiress and businesswoman
- Liselott Willén (born 1972), Swedish-Finnish author from Åland

== See also ==
- Miss Liselott (German: Fräulein Liselott), a 1934 German comedy film
- Liselotte
- Lieselotte
