= Lotti (given name) =

Lotti is a Danish, German, and Swedish feminine given name that is a diminutive form of Charlotte or Lieselotte, an alternate form of Lotte, and that is also related to Lisa, Elisa and Elisabeth. Notable people with the name include the following:

== Given name ==
- Lotti Golden (born 1949), American singer-songwriter, record producer, poet and artist
- Lotti Huber (1912–1998), German actress

== Nickname ==
- Lotti Fraser, birth name Charlotte Elizabeth Fraser, (born 1989), English actress and singer
- Lotti Tschanz, whose full name is Charlotte Tschanz (born 1933), Swiss archer
- Lotti van der Gaag, Charlotte van der Gaag (1923 – 1999), Dutch sculptor and painter

== See also ==
- Loti (disambiguation)
- Lott (disambiguation)
- Lotta (name)
- Lotte (name)
- Lottia mesoleuca
- Lottie (name)
- Lotto (disambiguation)
- Lotty
