= Lotte (name) =

- Gender: Female

Origin
- Origin: Old High German
- Region of origin: Europe

Other names
- Related names: Charlotte, Lieselotte, Liesl, Lilo

Lotte is a female given name. It is a diminutive of the names Lieselotte and Charlotte, which itself is a female form of the male name Charlot, a diminutive of Charles.

- Lotte Anker (born 1958), Danish jazz saxophonist and composer
- Lotte Backes (1901–1990), German pianist, organist and composer
- Lotte Bagge (born 1968), Danish footballer
- Lotte Bailyn (born 1930), American social psychologist
- Lotte van Beek (born 1991), Dutch speed skater
- Lotte de Beer (born 1981), Dutch opera director
- Lotte Berk (1913–2003), German-British dancer and teacher
- Lotte Brand Philip (1910–1986), German art historian and professor
- Lotte Brott (1922–1998), Canadian cellist and music administrator
- Lotte Bruil-Jonathans (born 1977), Dutch female badminton player
- Lotte Egging (born 1988), Dutch cricketer
- Lotte Eisner (1896–1983), French-German film historian
- Lotte Eriksen (born 1987), Norwegian squash player
- Lotte Flack (born 1994), German actress
- Lotte Friis (born 1988), Danish competitive swimmer
- Lotte Glob (born 1944), Danish ceramic artist living in Scotland
- Lotte Grigel (born 1991), Danish handball player
- Lotte Hass (1928–2015), Austrian underwater diver, model and actress
- Lotte Hellinga (born 1932), Dutch literary historian
- Lotte Herrlich (1883–1956), German photographer
- Lotta Hitschmanova (1909–1990), Czech-Canadian humanitarian
- Lotte van Hoek (born 1991), Dutch racing cyclist
- Lotte Hollands (born 1981), Dutch mathematical physicist
- Lotte Horne (born 1943), Danish film actress
- Lotte Ingrisch (1930–2022), Austrian author and playwright
- Lotte Jacobi (1896–1990), German photographer
- Lotte Kiærskou (born 1975), Danish team handball player
- Lotte Koch (1913–2013), Belgian-German film actress
- Lotte Kopecky (born 1995), Belgian racing cyclist
- Lotte Lang (1900–1985), Austrian actress
- Lotte Laserstein (1898–1993), German-Swedish painter and portraitist
- Lotte Ledl (1930–2025), Austrian actress
- Lotte Lehmann (1888–1976), German operatic soprano
- Lotte Lenya (1898–1981), Austrian-American singer and actress
- Lotte Loewe (1900–19??), German chemist
- Lotte Lorring (1893–1939), German actress
- Lotte Meitner-Graf (1899–1973), Austrian photographer
- Lotte Meldgaard Pedersen (born 1972), Danish match racing sailor
- Lotte Moos (1909–2008), German-American poet and playwright
- Lotte Motz (1922–1997), Austrian-American scholar
- Lotte Munk (born 1969), Danish actress
- Lotte Neumann (1896–1977), German actress and screenwriter
- Lotte Nogler (born 1947), Italian alpine skier
- Lotte Olsen (born 1966), Danish badminton player
- Lotte Pusch (1890–1983), German physical chemist
- Lotte Rausch (1913–1995), German actress
- Lotte Reiniger (1899–1981), German (later British) silhouette animator and film director
- Lotte Salling (born 1964), Danish children's author
- Lotte Schöne, (1891–1977), Austrian operatic soprano
- Lotte Smiseth Sejersted (born 1991), Norwegian alpine skier
- Lotte Specht (1911–2002), German footballer
- Lotte Spira (1883–1943), German actress
- Lotte Stam-Beese (1903–1988), German architect and urban planner
- Lotte Stein (1894–1982), German actress
- Lotte Strauss (1913–1985), German-American pathologist
- Lotte Tarp (1945–2002), Danish actress
- Lotte Toberentz (1900–19??), German concentration camp commandant
- Lotte Ulbricht (1903–2002), East German politician, former First Lady of East Germany
- Lotte Verbeek (born 1982), Dutch actress
- Lotte Wæver (born 1942), Danish actress and television presenter
- Lotte Wubben-Moy (born 1999), English footballer

== Fictional characters ==
- Lotte Jansson, one of the main characters in the anime series Little Witch Academia
- Lotte, the main character in the Estonian book and animated film series Lotte from Gadgetville, Lotte and the Moonstone Secret and Lotte and the Lost Dragons
- Lotte Frank, a minor supporting character in the anime series Monster
- Charlotte S., the love interest in the classic German novel The Sorrows of Young Werther is most commonly called Lotte in the original German text, although this name is much less commonly used in English translations.

== See also ==
- Lotte (disambiguation)
- Lotta (name)
- Lotten
- Lotti (given name)
- Lottie (name)
