= Baidoo =

Baidoo is a surname. Notable people with the surname include:

- Charlotte Lily Baidoo, Ghanaian banker
- Ishmael Baidoo (born 1998), Ghanaian footballer
- Michael Baidoo (born 1999), Ghanaian footballer
- Shabazz Baidoo (born 1988), English footballer
- Stephen Baidoo (born 1976), Ghanaian footballer
