= James Herron =

James Herron may refer to:

- James Hervey Herron (1875–1948), American mechanical and consulting engineer
- James P. Herron (1894–1967), American football player and coach
