= Loti =

Loti may refer to:

- Loti, Pakistan, a place
- Pierre Loti, the pseudonym of Louis Marie Julien Viaud, French writer
- Lesotho loti, the currency of Lesotho
- "Loti" (song), by Elvana Gjata, 2021

== See also ==
- Lotti (given name)
