= Lotta (name) =

Lotta is given name and nickname that is a diminutive of Charlotte and Charlotta. Notable people with this name include the following:

== Given name ==
- Lotta Björklund (born 1969), Swedish politician
- Lotta Hamari (born 1985), Finnish politician
- Lotta Henttala (born 1989), Finnish racing cyclist
- Lotta Hintsa (born 1988), Finnish beauty queen
- Lotta Hitschmanova (1909–1990), Canadian humanitarian
- Lotta Högström (born 1962), Swedish politician
- Lotta Hetler James (1876–1945), American public speaker
- Lotta Lindgren, whose stage name is Léon (born 1993), Swedish singer and songwriter
- Lotta Linthicum (1870s–1952), American actress
- Lotta Losten (born 1981), Swedish actress, designer, and photographer
- Lotta Lundgren (born 1971), Swedish television host and food writer
- Lotta Nieminen (born 1986), Finnish illustrator and graphic designer
- Lotta Ökvist (born 1997), Swedish footballer
- Lotta Runesson (born 1981), Swedish footballer
- Lotta Sollander (born 1953), Swedish alpine skier
- Lotta Wahlin (born 1983), Swedish professional golfer

== Nicknames ==
- Lotta Bromé, nickname of Charlotta Bromé (born 1964), Swedish presenter and host
- Lotta Crabtree, nickname of Charlotte Mignon Crabtree (1847–1924), American stage actress
- Lotta Dann (born 1971), New Zealand journalist
- Lotta Engberg, nickname of Anna Charlotte Engberg (born Pedersen; 1963), Swedish singer, actress and television host
- Lotta Faust, nickname of Charlotte Faust (1880–1910), American stage actress
- Lotta Falkenbäck, nickname of Charlotte Falkenbäck (born 1959), Swedish skater
- Lotta Hedlund, nickname of Charlotte Jean Hedlund (born Charlotte Jean Butler; March 10, 1944), American-Swedish singer
- Lotta Schelin, nickname of Charlotta Eva Schelin (born 1984), Swedish professional footballer
- Lotta Sparre, nickname of Charlotta Sparre (1719–1795), Swedish noble and courtier
- Lotta Triven, pseudonym of Charlotta Frölich (1698–1770), Swedish writer, historian, agronomist and poet

== Fictional characters ==
- Lotta, a character from Enid Blyton's The Circus Series
- Lotta, a 1992 character from Astrid Lindgren's children's books
- Lotta, a character from the children's series Charlie and Lola
- Little Lotta, the title character of the Little Lotta comic series
- Lotta, character on Harvey Girls Forever! and pseudonym of Little Lotta
- Lotta Hart, character on Ace Attorney
- Lotta, a character from Carl the Collector

== See also ==
- Eva-Lotta Kiibus
- Lota (name)
- Lotta (disambiguation)
- Lotte (name)
- Lotti (given name)
- Lotty
