= Lotto (disambiguation) =

Lotto is another term for lottery.

Lotto may also refer to:

- Six-number lottery games, which often have "Lotto" in their name
- Lotto America, one of many U.S. lottery games called Lotto
- Lotto (Milan Metro), a railway station in Milan, Italy
- Lotto carpet, a carpet having a lacy arabesque pattern
- Lotto Sport Italia, an Italian sports apparel manufacturer
- Lotto–Intermarché, a Belgian cycling team
- "Lotto" (The Office), a 2011 episode of the US television series
- Lotto (band), a Polish alternative rock trio
- Lotto (album), by They Are Gutting a Body of Water
- Lotto (Exo album)
- "Lotto" (song), by EXO
- "Lotto", a song by Joyner Lucas from the 2020 album ADHD
- Lorenzo Lotto (c. 1480–1556/57), Italian painter, draughtsman and illustrator
- Myron P. Lotto (1925–2017), American politician

== See also ==
- Loto (disambiguation)
- Lotta (disambiguation)
- Lotte (disambiguation)
- Lotti (given name)
- Lotty
