= Charlotte Baker =

Charlotte Baker may refer to:

- Charlotte Alice Baker (1833–1909), American historian, journalist, and teacher
- Charlotte Johnson Baker (1855–1937), American physician
