= James M. King =

American Methodist minister, writer, and political activist (1839–1907)

James Marcus King (18 March 1839 – 3 October 1907) was an American Methodist minister, writer, and political activist. He served as secretary of the anti-Catholic National League for the Protection of American Institutions from its founding in the summer of 1889 until his death in 1907. Supporters of the organization included John D. Rockefeller, Cornelius Vanderbilt, and Abram Hewitt among others.

== Family and early life ==
King was born in Girard, Pennsylvania in 1839. His father. Rev. Elijah King, was ordained by Bishop Francis Asbury. James King studied at Newbury Seminary in Vermont before attending Wesleyan University in Connecticut. After graduating in 1862, he taught for six years at the Fort Edward Collegiate Institution, which was run by his brother, Rev. Joseph E. King. In 1866, he became a minister in the Methodist Episcopal Church. He first served in the Troy, New York area before being moved to New York City, where he remained for the rest of his life.

In 1888, The Treasury, an evangelical Protestant magazine, described King as "the recognized leader and representative of the Methodist Episcopal Church" in New York City.

In 1889, King became general secretary of the National League for the Protection of American Institutions. The League was formed to advocate to promote a new constitutional amendment which would have banned the disbursing of public funds to religious institutions, most notably the Roman Catholic Church. It was an updated version of the Blaine Amendment which had nearly passed in 1875. The NLPAI was formed during a period of intense anti-Catholic sentiment; the American Protective Association had been formed two years earlier.
