= Lilo (name) =

Lilo is a feminine nickname (sometimes a short form or hypocorism of Liselotte or Lieselotte) and a surname. It may refer to the following people:

== Nickname ==
- Carmine Galante (1910–1979), American mobster
- Elisabeth Charlotte Gloeden (1903–1944), German lawyer executed for harboring a member of the 20 July plot to assassinate Hitler
- Liselotte Herrmann (1909–1938), German communist executed by Nazi Germany
- Lindsay Lohan (born 1986), American actress
- Rob Levin (1955–2006), founder of the Freenode IRC network
- Lilo Milchsack (1905–1992), German promoter of post-war German-British relations
- Liselotte Pulver (born 1929), Swiss actress sometimes credited as Lilo Pulver
- Lieselotte Lilo Ramdohr (1913–2013), member of the German anti-Nazi student resistance group White Rose
- Liselotte Lilo Rasch-Naegele (1914–1978), German painter, graphic artist, fashion designer and book illustrator

== Surname ==
- Gordon Darcy Lilo (born 1965), Solomon Islander politician, Prime Minister of the Solomon Islands from 2011 to 2014
- Serge Lilo (born 1985), New Zealand rugby union footballer
- Vunga Lilo (born 1983), Tongan rugby union footballer

== Fictional characters ==
- Lilo Pelekai, one of the two titular main protagonists (alongside Stitch) of Disney's Lilo & Stitch franchise

== See also ==
- Lilo (disambiguation)
- Lilou, a French female given name originally spelled Liló in Occitan
