= Isabelle Westbury =

English cricketer and journalist

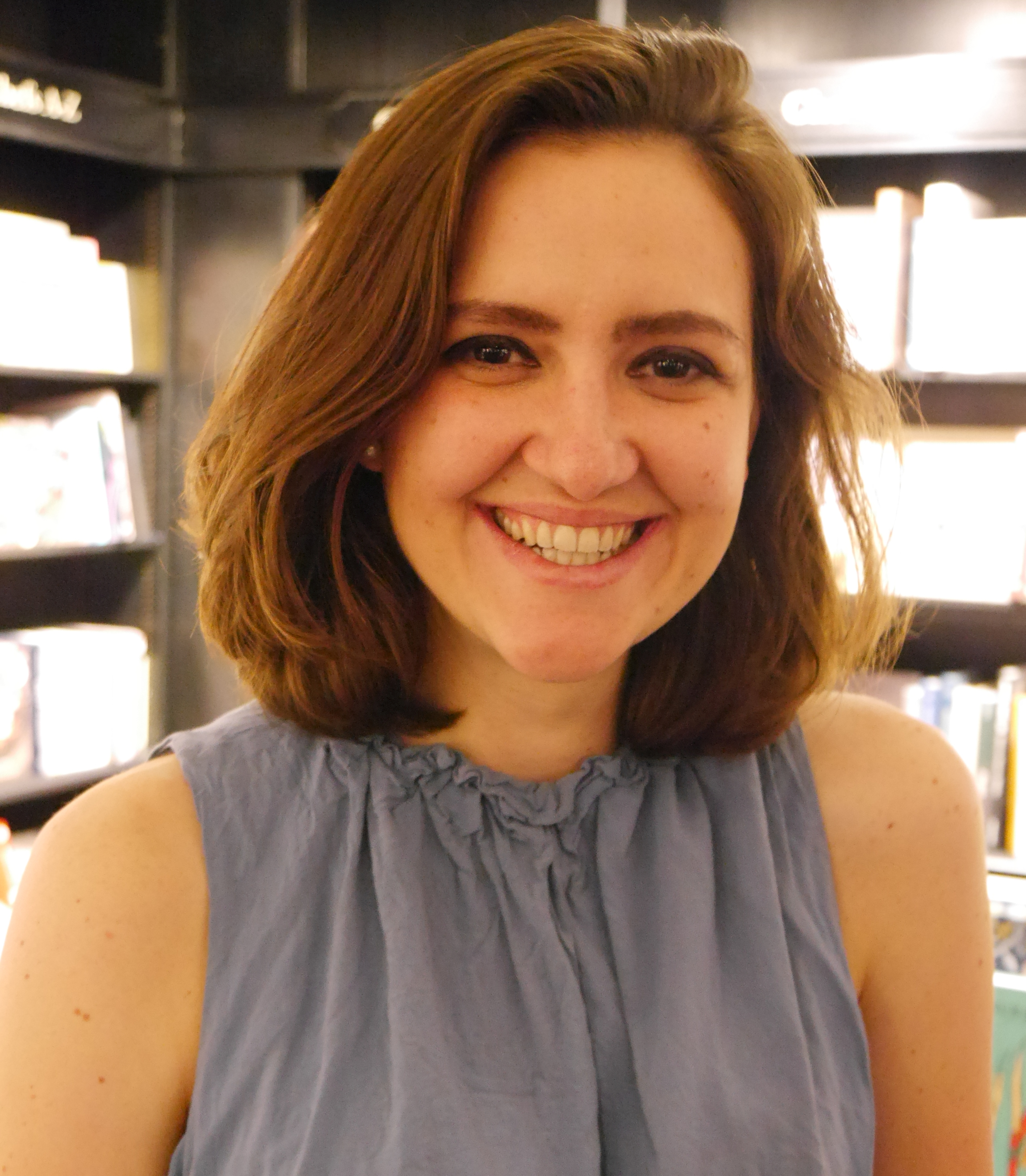
- Westbury in 2019

Personal information
- Full name: Isabelle Mary Geraldine Westbury
- Born: 8 March 1990 (age 36); Hammersmith, London, England
- Batting: Right-handed
- Bowling: Right-arm off break
- Role: Bowler

International information
- National side: Netherlands (2005)
- Only ODI (cap 67): 19 August 2005 v Ireland

Domestic team information
- Years: Team
- 2007–2012: Somerset
- 2013–2017: Middlesex
- 2016: Western Storm

Career statistics
Competition	WODI	WLA	WT20
Matches	1	56	28
Runs scored	0	461	198
Batting average	0.00	12.13	13.20
100s/50s	0/0	0/0	0/0
Top score	0	43	33*
Balls bowled	60	2,281	540
Wickets	0	66	36
Bowling average	–	22.93	13.50
5 wickets in innings	0	1	0
10 wickets in match	0	0	0
Best bowling	–	5/20	4/15
Catches/stumpings	1/–	30/0	8/–
- Source: CricketArchive, 3 January 2022

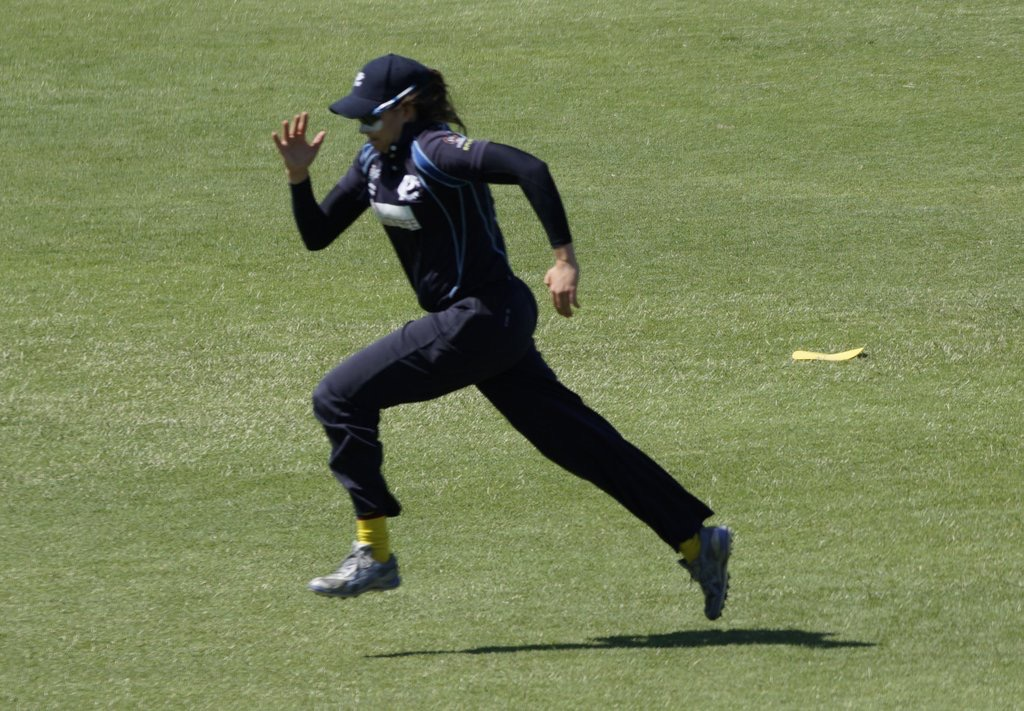
Westbury chasing a ball in the field, 2016

Isabelle "Izzy" Westbury (born 8 March 1990) is a sports journalist, lawyer, military officer and former cricketer. As a cricketer, she was a right-arm off break bowler and played for Somerset and Middlesex. She captained Middlesex for two seasons, in 2015 and 2016. Westbury also appeared in one One Day International.

She was President of the Oxford Union in 2011–12. Westbury retired from playing cricket in 2017 and went on to work as a print and broadcast journalist for The Daily Telegraph and the BBC. In 2021, Westbury joined the Triple M radio commentary team as an on-air commentator for the 2021-2022 Ashes series. She is a Legal Officer in the Royal Air Force.

== Early life ==
Born in Hammersmith, London, Westbury experienced a nomadic childhood, living in Mongolia, Malaysia, Easter Island, Syria and the Netherlands. She first started playing cricket in the Netherlands, after being prevented from playing club football alongside boys beyond the age of 13, at the "very traditional club" near her house.

Westbury studied for an undergraduate degree in physiology at Hertford College, Oxford, graduating in 2013. In addition to her cricket career, she also played hockey for Oxford, achieving her Blue by playing in the Varsity Hockey Match against Cambridge in March 2010. In 2011, she was elected President of the Oxford Union, having earlier served as the society's Secretary, and was described as "the most engaging president that the Oxford Union has had in years."

== Cricket career ==
=== The Netherlands ===
Aged 13, Westbury began to play boys cricket for The Hague Cricket Club. In 2005, aged 15, Westbury made her debut for the Netherlands during the European Championship in Wales.

=== England ===
Westbury won a sports scholarship to Millfield School in Street, Somerset in 2006. She joined Somerset for the 2007 County Championship. In January 2010, Westbury was named as part of the England Academy squad for the High Performance Camp in Bangalore, India. Westbury joined Middlesex in 2013, and was made captain the following year. In 2016, she signed for the Western Storm in the inaugural Kia Super League. Westbury retired from playing cricket the following season.

== Media work ==
Whilst playing county cricket, Westbury worked as a freelance journalist and broadcaster for the BBC from September 2013 onward, writing mostly on cricket and sport. Westbury also appeared as a regular presenter on BBC World Service’s cricket podcast Stumped from 2017 to 2021, where she offered valuable insight with her experience as both a former professional cricketer and journalist. In March 2019, Westbury became a regular cricket writer for The Telegraph, covering men’s and women’s international matches, domestic matches, and interviews. Moreover, Westbury utilised her legal and political background to explore off-field issues in cricket, such as governance, gender equity, and broader controversies. As a freelance journalist, Westbury has published for many different print organisations, including cricket-centric digital websites such as cricket.com.au and Cricinfo, as well as Australian print corporations such as The Herald Sun and The Age. In 2020, Westbury was shortlisted for her freelance work at the SJA British Sports Journalism Awards, and nominated for a top 10 ‘Writing Best Column’ in the AIPS Sport Media Awards in 2021. Westbury would walk away from print journalism in February of 2022 to prioritise her legal career.

In August 2015, Westbury became a BBC Test Match Special radio commentator for the 2015 Women's Ashes series, and would become a regular BBC radio presenter across their coverage of domestic and international cricket. Westbury was awarded the Christopher Martin-Jenkins Domestic Cricket Broadcaster of the Year award in 2017 for her efforts and accomplishments in broadcasting, becoming the first female winner in its history. As well as this, Westbury would be named as runner-up for the Christopher Martin-Jenkins Young Cricket Journalist of the Year award, before going on to win the award in 2018. In January 2016, Westbury would join the Australian free-to-air network Channel 9’s commentary team for the Women's T20I series between Australia and India in a largely uncredited role, providing insight into the bowling action of the players. In November of 2021, Westbury joined Australian media company Southern Cross Austero as a freelance sports broadcaster for the 2021-22 Men’s Ashes tour. She is a recurring member of the “all-star” Triple M ‘Summer of Cricket’ commentary team, where she continues to provide “a distinctly English flavour” as an “international [cricket] great”.

== Legal career ==
Westbury qualified as a lawyer in 2018, and serves as a Legal Officer in the Royal Air Force. She specialises in conflict and criminal law.
