= Lotha =

Lotha may refer to:

- Lotha Naga, a Naga tribe in Wokha district, Nagaland, India
- Lotha language, spoken in Wokha, Nagaland, India

== See also ==
- Lotta (disambiguation)
