= Litta =

Litta may refer to:

- Litta (family)

== People ==
- Alfonso Litta (1608–1679), Cardinal and Archbishop of Milan from 1652 to 1679
- Lorenzo Litta (1756–1820), Italian littérateur and churchman, who became a cardinal
- Paolo Litta (1871-1931), Italian composer

== Places ==
- Casale Litta, Varese, Italy
- Orio Litta, Lodi, Italy

== Other ==
- Palazzo Litta, Milan
- Madonna Litta

== See also ==
- Lotta (disambiguation)
- Media related to House of Litta at Wikimedia Commons
