= Charlotte le Pelletier =

French–American composer

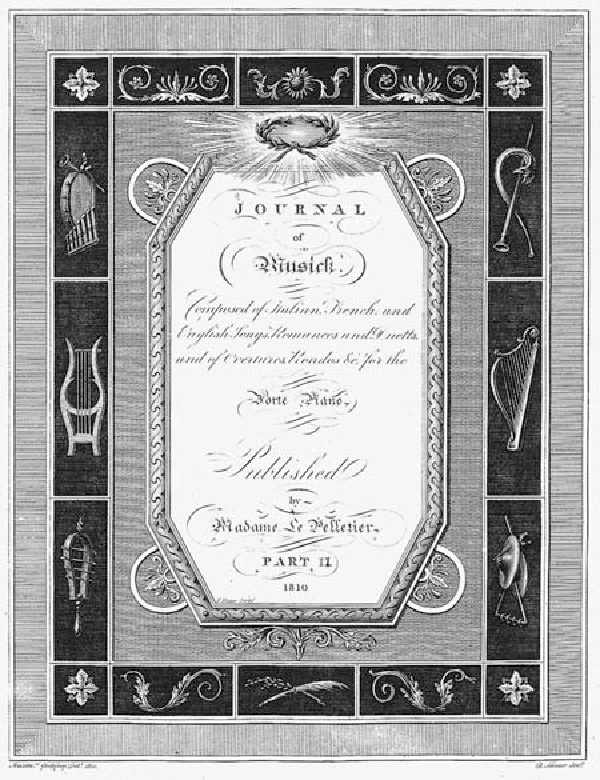
- Charlotte le Pelletier's Journal of Musick
- Born: 1778; Périgny
- Died: 1855 (aged 76–77); Blois
- Occupation: Musician, composer
- Parent(s): Charles Léon Taillevis de Périgny

Elizabeth Charlotte Taillevis de Perrigny le Pelletier (1778–1855) was a French-born musician, composer, and music teacher. She is thought to be the first female composer in Maryland.

== Life ==
Charlotte le Pelletier was born on 1778 in Perrigny, France, the youngest of eight children of Charles Léon de Taillevis (1730–95), Marquis of Perrigny, and Anne Marie Madeleine de La Tuste (1739–93). Both of her parents died during the Reign of Terror. In 1797 she married Victor Le Pelletier. They had a son, also named Victor.

In 1801 the couple sailed to Saint-Domingue, where the Perrigny family owned slave plantations. The Haitian Revolution had already begun, and her husband was killed at Torbeck in 1803 while serving in the French National Guard. Like thousands of other French people there, Charlotte le Pelleteir fled to the United States. She settled in the French Town neighborhood of Baltimore, Maryland and opened a studio with her brother, the Abbé George Taillevis de Perrigny. (A Catholic priest, George de Perrigny also served as chaplain to Charles Carroll of Carrollton and was the second librarian of the Library Company of Baltimore.) She taught music and performed concerts.

Sometime in or prior to 1816, she returned to France. She died in Blois in 1855 at the age of 77.

== Journal of Musick ==
In January 1810, Charlotte le Pelletier began publishing her Journal of Musick, which was credited to "Madame le Pelletier". It consisted of the sheet music of 31 musical works that were sent to subscribers separately, one to three pieces each month. The entire series were later sold together as a single bound volume. The Journal was printed by George Willig of Philadelphia, with an elaborate cover designed by Maximilian Godefroy and engraved by Benjamin Tanner. The next year she planned a second series of the Journal of Musick, but it was never published.

Many of the works are French and Italian works that were otherwise unavailable in America, including many from taken from fashionable French opéra comique. Some pieces are taken from a short-lived French journal published in New York, Journal des Dames (1810), signed only by the pseudonym "J. T."

She included two of her own compositions in the Journal. Her Fantasie sur un Air Russe for pianoforte may be the earliest American piece of theme and variation music composed by a woman, and is a technically challenging work to perform. Based on a Russian folk tune, it is dedicated to her friend Eugenia Osipovna Dashkov, wife of the Russian ambassador Andrey Yakovlevich Dashkov. The other work is a musical setting of the poem "The Wonder" by Thomas Moore.

The Journal of Musick circulated among elite circles in the United States. First Lady Dolley Madison owned a copy of the Journal of Musick, probably lost in the Burning of Washington. It was likely used during her regular "Wednesday Nights" musical performances at the White House.

=== Contents ===
- Overture to the Opera L’Auberge de Bagnères. Composed by Catel. Arranged for the Forte Piano by Madame Le Pelletier [p. 2]
- Air from the Opera the Sylphs [Die Sylphen]. Music by Himmel. Words from the translation of Camoens. Adapted by Mrs. Le Pelletiere [sic] [p. 9]
- Romance de l’Opéra la Romance. Musique de Berton. English words by Moore. Adapted by Mrs. Le Pelletier [p. 13]
- Boleros de l’Opéra de Ponce de Leon. Par: H.Berton. Arrangé pour le Piano par Madame Le Pelletier [p. 17]
- Lo sventurato adora. Blangini [p. 20]
- Song, by Charles Leftly, Esq. Music by J:T: [p. 25]
- Interlude of the Opera les Confidences. Composed by Nicolo Isouard. Arranged for the Forte Piano by Madame Le Pelletier [p. 28]
- Clori la Pastorella. Canzonetta Del Signor Crescentini [p. 32]
- Polonaise du Concert Interrompu. Musique de Berton [p. 36]
- Stances sur la mort d’un Serin. Par Charles Lagarenne. Extraites du Journal des Dames. Musique de J.T. [p. 44]
- Song by T. Moore. Music by Madame Le Pelletier [p. 46]
- Romance [p. 50]
- Song by R.B.Sheridan. Music by J:T: [p. 53]
- Overture and Interlude of the Opera Une folie. Composed by Méhul. Arranged for the Forte Piano by Madame Le Pelletier [p. 58]
- Romance de Michel Ange. Musique de Nicolo Isouard [p. 72]
- Duetto. Del Signor Pietro Guglielmi Nella Debora e Sisara. Accomt. de Piano par Giacomelli. Paroles Françaises de M. Desriaux [p. 78]
- Love and Kitty. A Favorite Song Composed by G. Gray [p. 86]
- Kitty's the Rose. A Favorite Ballad in the Romance of An Bratach. Written by C Dibdin Jr. Composed by W. Reeve [p. 89]
- La Leçon. Romance du Bouffe et le Tailleur. Musique de P. Gaveaux. [p. 94; p. 97, second couplet; p. 99, third couplet]
- The Willow. A Favorite Song in the Captive of Spilburg. Composed by J.L. Dussek [p. 102]
- Fantaisie sur un Air Russe. Composèe pour le Forte Piano et dédièe à Madame Daschkoff née Baronne de Preuzar [p. 108]
- Duo de Ma Tante Aurore. Musique de Boieldieu [p. 122]
- Song by Anna Seward [My Stella Sleeps]. Musique by J:T: [p. 138]
- Air de Saul [p. 142]
- Soft as the Falling Dews of Night. A Favorite Ballad by Richard Light [p. 144]
- La Raison Détrônée. Couplets extraits du Journal des Dames. Musique de J:T: [p. 146]
- Little Winny Wilkins. A Favorite Song by Mr. Cherry. Composed with an Accompaniment for the Flute and Piano Forte or Harpe by Mr. Whitaker [p. 150]
- Complainte de l’aveugle Espagnol. Paroles de Massiac. Musique de J.T. [p. 154]
- The Coronach. A Funeral Song From the Lady of the Lake. Music by Dr. John Clarke of Cambridge [p. 158]
- The Soldier Bridegroom's Song. From the Lady of the Lake. Music by Sir John Stevenson [p. 163]
- Blanche of Devan's song from the Lady of the Lake. Music by Dr. John Clarke of Cambridge [p. 166]
