= Charlotte Smith =

Charlotte Smith may refer to:

- Charlotte Smith (writer) (1749–1806), English poet and novelist
- Charlotte Richardson (1775–1825), or Smith, British poet
- Charlotte Smith (activist) (1840–1917), American reformer and activist
- Charlotte Fell Smith (1851–1937), British historian
- Charlotte Hennessey (1873–1928), usually referred to as Charlotte Smith, American actress and mother of Mary Pickford
- Lottie Pickford (Charlotte Smith, 1893–1936), American actress and sister of Mary Pickford
- Charlotte Smith (broadcaster) (born 1964), English BBC radio presenter of Farming Today

== Sports ==
- Charlotte Smith (baseball) (1919–?), All-American Girls Professional Baseball League player
- Charlotte Smith (cricketer) (born 1966), Danish cricketer
- Charlotte Smith (basketball) (born 1973), American basketball player
