= Liselotte =

Liselotte is a feminine given name which may refer to:

- childhood name of Elizabeth Charlotte, Princess Palatine (1652–1722), German princess, sister-in-law of King Louis XIV of France
- Liselotte Blumer (born 1957), Swiss retired female badminton player
- Liselotte Forsberg (born 1972), Swedish politician
- Liselotte Grschebina (1908–1994), German-born Israeli photographer
- Liselotte Herrmann (1909–1938), German Communist Resistance fighter executed by the Nazis
- Liselotte Hopfer, German luger who won a silver medal at the 1935 European Championships
- Liselotte Landbeck (1916–2013), Austrian figure skater and speed skater
- Liselotte Neumann (born 1966), Swedish golfer
- LiseLotte Olsson (born 1954), Swedish politician
- Liselotte Olsson (born 1968), Swiss sprint canoer
- Liselotte Pulver (born 1929), Swiss actress
- Liselotte Richter (1906–1968), German philosopher and theologian
- Liselotte Schramm-Heckmann (1904–1995), German painter
- Liselotte, main character of the manga series Liselotte & Witch's Forest

== See also ==
- Lise-Lotte Rebel (born 1951), bishop of the Diocese of Helsingør in the Evangelical Lutheran Church of Denmark
- Liselott
- Lieselotte
