= Charlotte Elizabeth Battles =

American bank president

- Born: October 11, 1864
- Died: December 17, 1952 (aged 88)
- Other names: C. Elizabeth Battles; Libbie Battles; Miss Charlotte Battles

Charlotte Elizabeth Battles (October 11, 1864 - December 17, 1952) was an American bank executive known for defying a presidential order to close her bank during the 1933 banking holiday.

== Biography ==
Battles was born in fall of 1864, and her parents were Rush S. and Charlotte Battles. She earned a degree from Mount Vernon Seminary in 1886. When her father died in 1904, Battles was promoted to bank president thereby becoming an early example of women in the United States to serve as a bank president. She ran the bank until it closed in 1946.

In 1933, Franklin D. Roosevelt ordered banks to close as part of the Emergency Banking Act. Battles refused to close her bank because it was a private bank, and the bank remained open during the banking holiday. In a letter to Roosevelt, Battles indicated that "We're minding our business, you mind yours".

Battles lived in Girard, Pennsylvania until her death in December 17, 1952. Her house, once known as the Charlotte Elizabeth Battles Memorial Museum, is part of the Hagen History Center. In 2021, the Pennsylvania Historical and Museum Commission agreed upon a historic marker to honor Battles, the marker is placed in front of the building that previously served as the Battles Bank.
