= Charlotte Anneveld =

Australian cricketer (born 1982)

Personal information
- Full name: Charlotte Anne Anneveld
- Born: 30 December 1982 (age 43); Sydney, New South Wales, Australia
- Role: Player, Coach

International information
- National side: Australia

Domestic team information
- Years: Team
- 2002–(unknown): New South Wales Breakers
- Australian Capital Territory
- Hampshire Women
- Lancashire Women
- Kent Women

Head coaching information
- Years: Team
- (unknown)–present: Gordon Women's Cricket Club
- Source: Charlotte Anneveld – ESPNcricinfo, 3 April 2025

Charlotte Anne Anneveld (born 30 December 1982, in Sydney, New South Wales) is an Australian cricket player.

Anneveld made her NSW Breakers debut in 2002 against a strong South Australia side down in Adelaide.

One of her greatest performances with the ball came in the 2005 final against QLD at North Sydney Oval, QLD were cruising to victory when Anneveld was thrown the ball and quickly picked up 4 wickets before her team-mate finished off the job at the other end to give NSW the title by 2 runs.

She went on to win numerous titles with NSW before relocating to ACT for a new opportunity. Charlotte was selected in the Australian Squad in 2007 before a knee injury ended her season.

Anneveld was selected in the wider T20 World Cup Squad for the 2014 tournament.

In her overseas career, Anneveld played one day cricket for English teams Hampshire Women, Lancashire Women and Kent Women. She played with other notable athletes such as Charlotte Edwards, Tammy Beaumont and Kate Cross.

Anneveld played for Gordon Women's Cricket Club in Australia for 23 years while also holding various committee positions and is currently the team's Head Coach and Player Development Manager. She is also a women's cricket commentator. She is a Representative Coach - Level 2.

Anneveld spent time in Singapore coaching the national team running coaching camps and facilitating guest specialised coaches. Annevend has also worked with the men's and women's teams in Papua New Guinea.
