= Charlotte Clarke =

Scottish academic

- Occupation: Academic
- Known for: research into living with dementia

Academic background
- Education: Glasgow College of Technology; Northumbria University
- Thesis: Who needs problems? : Finding meaning in caregiving for people with dementia

Charlotte Laura Clarke is the Professor of Health in Social Science at the University of Edinburgh. Her research centres on the experiences of living with dementia.

== Early life and education ==
Clarke qualified as a nurse in 1986 from what was then called Glasgow College of Technology and worked clinically for a number of years in the National Health Service before moving into roles that were more focused on education and research. She received a part-time PhD studentship from the Regional Health Authority and focused on the experiences of carers of people with dementia. Her doctoral thesis, awarded by Northumbria University, was entitled Who needs problems? : Finding meaning in caregiving for people with dementia.

== Career ==
Clarke is the co-director of the Edinburgh Centre for Research on the Experience of Dementia, College Dean International and director of Global Communities at the Edinburgh Futures Institute. Much of her research addresses people's perception of risk, our understanding of risk management and enablement, and resilence in order to improve quality of life for people with dementia.

In 2010, Clarke jointly edited Risk Assessment and Management for Living Well with Dementia, which was awarded first prize in the 2012 British Medical Association Medical Book Award (health and social care). More recently, she started to explore the use of theatre and film in communicating and engaging the public in her research findings. Jack & Jill and The Red Postbox was a theatre performance examining the changing lives of a family due to a diagnosis of dementia, inspired by research that explored risk and resilence when living with dementia. She also has an interest in nursing education and has examined student learning dynamics in clinical contexts including the use information technology to support nursing students in practice.
