= Lotta Nieminen =

Finnish illustrator and graphic designer

- Born: February 1, 1986 (age 40); Helsinki, Finland
- Education: University of Art and Design Helsinki, Rhode Island School of Design
- Known for: Illustration, graphic design
- Website: www.lottanieminen.com

Lotta Nieminen (born February 1, 1986) is a Finnish illustrator and graphic designer based in New York City. She is known for creating children's books, as well as designing digital interfaces, publications, packaging and furniture. She has designed content for companies like Facebook, Google, Volkswagen, Bulgari, Marimekko and Hermès.

== Early life and education ==
Lotta Nieminen is Finnish-born graphic designer and illustrator based in New York City. Her father Risto Nieminen is director of the music department at the Gulbenkian Foundation, and her mother Raija Malka is an artist. When she was a child, her family lived in Paris for five years. She studied graphic design at University of Art and Design Helsinki and Rhode Island School of Design.

== Career ==
In 2010 Nieminen, then art director for Trendi Magazine, decided to leave Finland to pursue a career in New York City. In an interview with the Finnish Cultural Institute in New York, Nieminen stated that she applied to several design studios in New York before she received an internship at Pentagram. Afterwards, she worked at RoAndCo Studio before leaving to pursue freelance work.

Nieminen started Lotta Nieminen Studio in 2012. Since then she has worked with companies such as Facebook, Google, New York Times, Bulgari, Volkswagen, Marimekko, Wired UK, and Hermès. In 2014, Nieminen illustrated the redesign of the Google Calendar.

In 2013, Nieminen published her first children's book Walk This World through an imprint of Templar Publishing. She illustrated and wrote the 2014 interactive children's cook book Pancakes!, part of her Cook in a Book series.

She participated in a livestream Show & Tell at Portland State University on May 8, 2014. In December 2017, Nieminen demonstrated her illustration techniques at a live art demonstration with New York Times editor Maria Russo. Nieminen redesigned Posture magazine in 2019 and was featured in Design Week.

== Reception ==
Nieminen received the 2010 YoungGuns Awards and the Print's "New Visual Artist" of the year. The Finnish design association Grafia named her its "Graphic Designer of the Year 2019". She was a member of the selection committee for the 2020 Graphic Designer of the Year. Her work was exhibited in the Design Museum, Helsinki, and as part of Design Week Helsinki. She has been featured in publications such as Interior Design, Motor1.com, The Great Discontent, and Gloria.
