= Lasta (disambiguation) =

Lasta is a historical district in Ethiopia

Lasta may also refer to:

- Lasta (woreda), a current district in Ethiopia
- Lasta, Greece, a town in Greece
- Lasta Beograd, a bus company in Serbia
- Utva Lasta, a Serbian-produced airplane
