= Lillo =

Lillo may refer to:

- Lillo Baby, a Brazilian baby accessory maker
- Lillo & Greg, an Italian comedy duo

== Places ==
- Lillo, Antwerp, a former town in Belgium, disappeared due to the expansion of the Port of Antwerp; what remains is now part of Berendrecht-Zandvliet-Lillo
- Lillo, Spain

== People ==
People with the surname Lillo include:

- Alejandra Lillo (born 1972), American designer
- Baldomero Lillo (1867–1923), Chilean naturalist author
- Carlos Lillo (1915–?), Chilean boxer
- Cristian Lillo (born 1985), Argentine professional footballer
- George Lillo (1693–1739), British playwright and tragedian
- Giuseppe Lillo (1814–1863), Italian composer
- Gustavo Lillo (born 1973), Argentine former professional footballer
- Juan Manuel Lillo (born 1965), Spanish football manager
- Lillo (footballer) (born 1989), Spanish footballer
- Luisa Pastor Lillo (1948–2018), Spanish politician
- Miguel Lillo (1862–1931), Argentine naturalist and professor
- Samuel Lillo (1870–1958), Chilean writer

People with the given name Lillo include:

- Lillo Brancato, Jr. (born 1976), American actor
- Lillo Thomas (born 1961), American former Olympic-qualifying athlete and recording artist
