= Lotto (band) =

- Origin: Gdańsk, Poland
- Genres: alternative rock, noise music, improvised music
- Years active: 2012-present
- Labels: Lado ABC, Instant Classic
- Members: Mike Majkowski; Łukasz Rychlicki; Paweł Szpura
- Website: Official Website

Lotto is a Polish alternative rock trio started in 2012 in Gdańsk by Mike Majkowski (bass violin), Łukasz Rychlicki (guitar), and Paweł Szpura (drums). Their first hit was Elite Feline.

They played e.g. with The Necks, at international festivals like Konfrontationen in Nickelsdorf, Jazz Jantar in Gdańsk, KRAAK Festival in Aalst, Belgium, Festival Densités in France or Enjoy Jazz in Heidelberg.

== Discography ==
- "Ask the Dust" (2013)
- "Elite Feline" (2016)
