= Charlotte Coles =

British oncologist

Charlotte Coles FMedSci
- Citizenship: British
- Occupations: Professor of Breast Cancer Clinical Oncology; NIHR

Charlotte E. Coles is a British oncologist and professor at the University of Cambridge. Her research focuses on using personalised radiation therapy for people with breast cancer. In 2019 she was awarded a Research Professorship at the British National Institute for Health Research (NIHR).

She also worked as the Editor-in-Chief of Elsevier's Clinical Oncology from 2015 until 2021.

In 2023, Coles was elected a Fellow of the Academy of Medical Sciences.
