= David K. MacEwen =

United States Army general

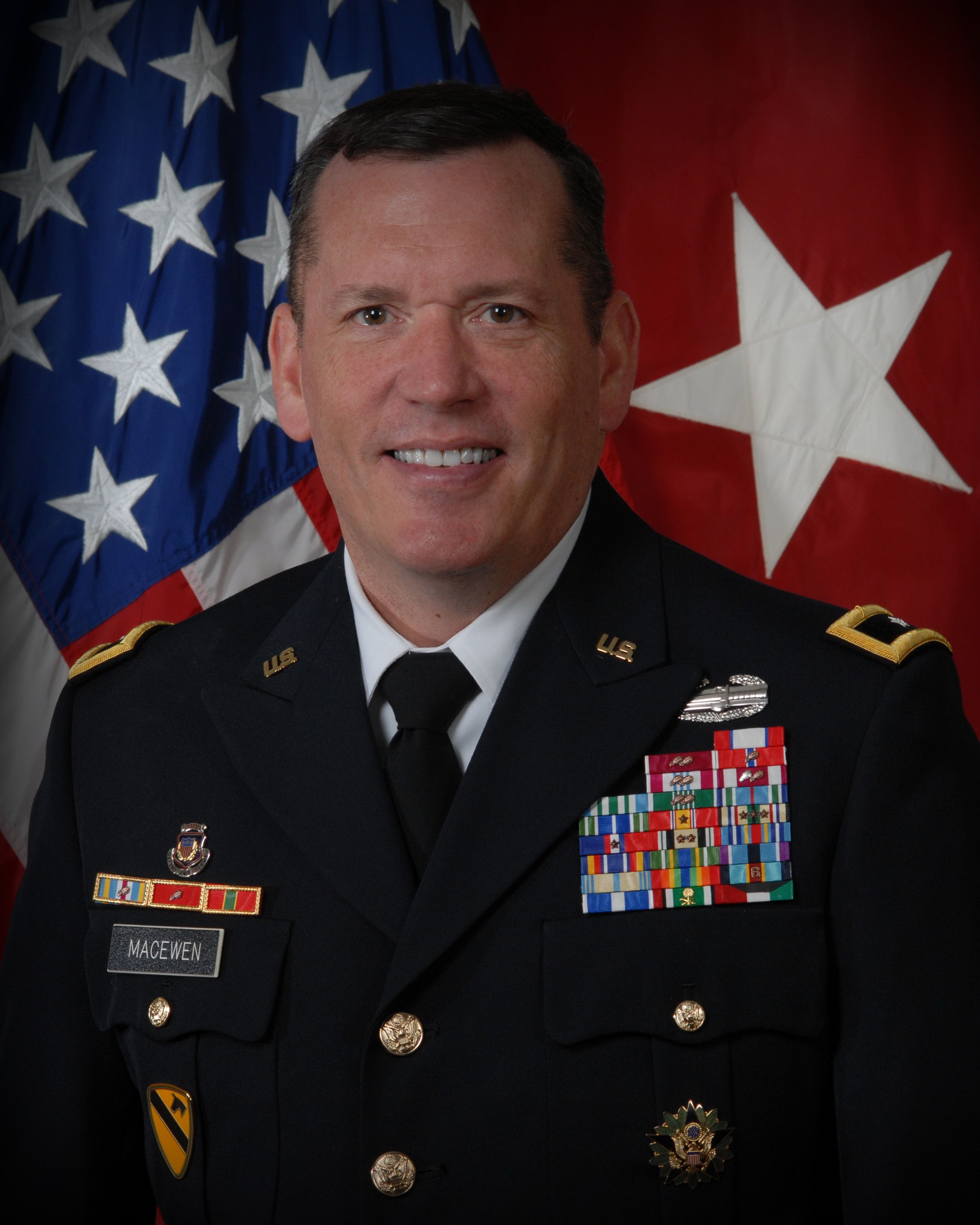
- Brigadier General MacEwen
- Military career
- Allegiance: United States
- Branch: United States Army
- Service years: 1981–2015
- Rank: Brigadier General
- Commands: The 59th Adjutant General of the Army

Brigadier General David K. MacEwen was the 59th adjutant general of the United States Army and executive director, Military Postal Service Agency, located at the Human Resources Command, Fort Knox, Kenrucky. He retired in 2015.

== Education ==
MacEwan attended Girard High School in Girard, Pennsylvania. In 1981, he graduated Clarion University of Pennsylvania, with a business management degree. He completed a master's degree in national security and strategic studies at the U.S. Naval War College in 2002.

== Military career ==
As of 2014, he was chief of staff of the U.S. Army Human Resources Command. His other significant assignments included commander, 1st Personnel Command; chief of the Colonels Management Office; executive officer of the Vice Chief of Staff of the Army; and commanding general of the U.S. Army Soldier Support Institute. He was promoted to the rank of brigadier general in 2012.

== Deployments ==
- Operation Desert Shield and Desert Storm
- Intrinsic Action
- Task Force Hawk
- Operation Allied Force and JTF Shining Hope
- Operation Allied Harbor
- Operation Iraqi Freedom

== Decorations and honors ==
- Army Distinguished Service Medal with Oak Leaf Cluster
- Legion of Merit with three Oak Leaf Clusters
- Bronze Star Medal with one Oak Leaf Cluster
- Defense Meritorious Service Medal with two Oak Leaf Clusters
- Meritorious Service Medal with six Oak Leaf Clusters
- Joint Service Commendation Medal
- Army Commendation Medal with two bronze Oak Leaf Cluster
- Army Achievement Medal
- Army Staff Identification Badge
- Combat Action Badge
