= Liesl =

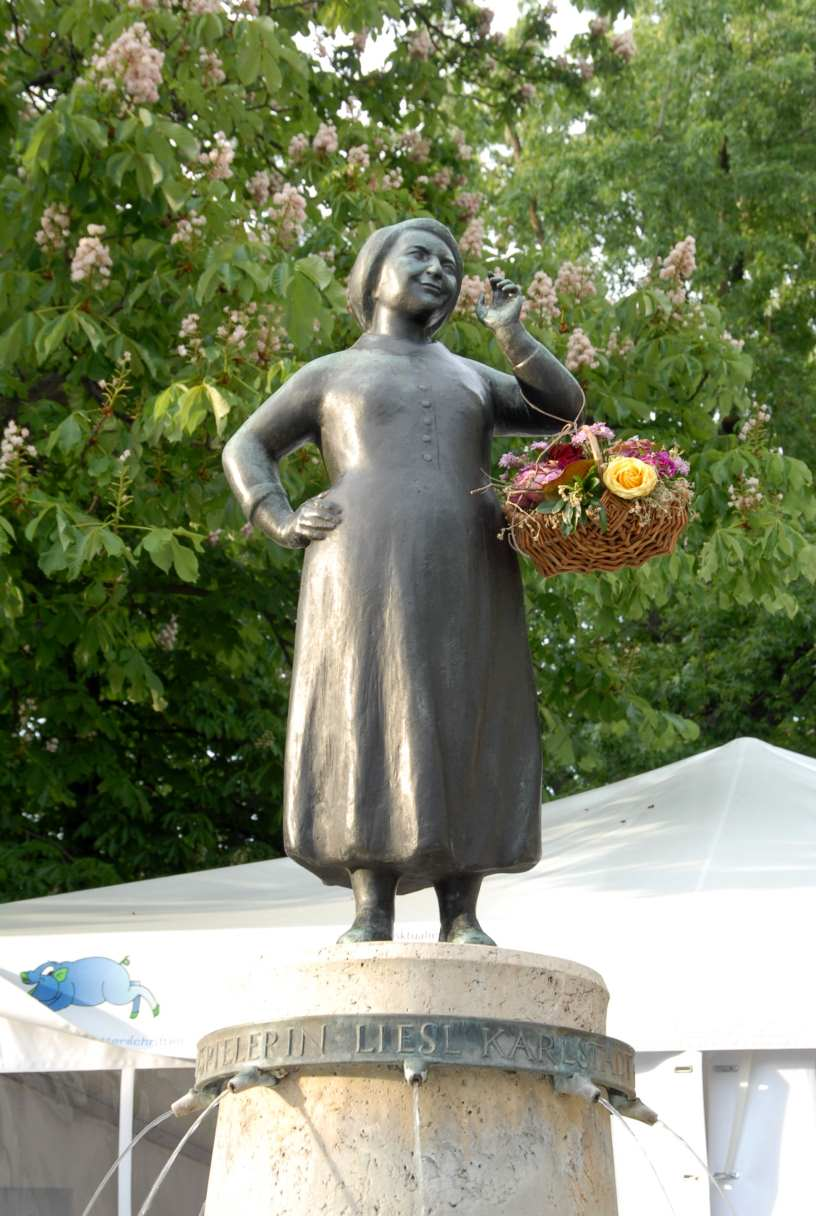
- Statue in Munich of German actress Liesl Karlstadt
- Gender: Female
- Language: German

Other names
- Variant forms: Lieselotte, Elisabeth

Liesl is a feminine given name of German origin. It is a diminutive of Lieselotte and Elisabeth. Notable people with the name include:

- Liesl Herbst (1903–1990), Austrian tennis player
- Liesl Ischia, Australian diver
- Liesl Jobson, South African poet
- Liesl Karlstadt (1892–1960), German actress and cabaret performer
- Liesl Perkaus (1905–1987), Austrian track and field athlete
- Liesl Seewald, Austrian luger
- Liesl Tommy, South African-American director

== Fictional characters ==
- Liesl von Trapp, a character in The Sound of Music and fictionalized version of Agathe von Trapp
