= Losta railway station =

Railway station in Russia

Losta

General information
- Other names: Russian: Лоста
- Location: Russia
- Coordinates: 59°10′18″N 39°59′21″E
- System: Goods railway station
- Owner: Russian Railways
- Operator: Russian Railways

Construction
- Parking: Available

Other information
- Status: Functioning
- Station code: 30000
- Fare zone: Northwestern Federal District

History
- Opened: 1946
Location

Losta (Russian: Лоста) is a railway station for freight trains in Vologda, Russia. It is located on Northern Railway.
