= Loti, Pakistan =

Coordinates: 28°57′0″N 69°24′0″E

- Town and union council
- Interactive map of Loti, Pakistan
- Country: Pakistan
- Region: Balochistan
- District: Dera Bugti District
- Time zone: UTC+5 (PST)

Loti is a town and union council of Dera Bugti District in the Balochistan province of Pakistan. It is located at 28°56'60N 69°24'0E, and has an altitude of 466 metres (1532 feet), the area is rich in natural resources.
