= Charlotte Duncan Smith Graham =

American labor organizer (1912–1993)

- Born: born 1912; Dallas, Texas
- Died: 1993
- Occupations: Seamstress and labor organizer
- Known for: Union activities
- Spouse: Frank W. Graham

Charlotte Duncan Smith Graham (1912–1993) was an American seamstress and labor organizer. She led major strikes in Dallas, Texas and elsewhere against the clothing manufacturing industry, and was an active member of labor unions.

== Personal history ==
She was born in Dallas, in 1912. Although she married twice, she had no children. Her second husband was Frank W. Graham. She died in 1993.

== Work conditions ==
In an oral history interview, Graham said the Justin-McCarty Manufacturers environment was hot, dirty, and had no fans. Workers wore old dresses they called “rags” because they would sweat so much, and they did not leave their seats because the next bundle of work was brought to them. She said management treated their workers as “less than human,” describing a time a needle went straight through her finger. She was not given time off for the long wait (an hour and a half) to see the doctor nor compensated for the medical costs.

Charlotte Duncan Graham led a dozen women in requesting a charter from the International Ladies' Garment Workers' Union (ILGWU) due to anger over working conditions. One instance was when Graham’s coworker was not allowed to use the restroom and consequently had an accident. Furious, Graham went into the restroom for half an hour, "daring the manager to fire her". The workers were only allowed to use the restroom during their thirty-minute lunch or fifteen-minute afternoon break. Following Graham’s 30-minute restroom strike, she completed a training period, after which she was to receive $12 a week. Instead, at the end of the training period, Justin-McCarty would fire workers, rehiring them as apprentices. This prevented the company from following through on the promised $12 a week salary. In addition, Justin-McCarty worked around a garment industry code limiting the work week to 36 hours by having employees clock out at 5 p.m., leave by the back entrance, then come back in the front door and work off the clock until 11 p.m.

== Strikes and unions begin ==
In February 1935, Graham’s union, which comprised an estimated 40 percent of garment workers in Dallas, voted 382-8 in favor of striking against the thirteen garment shops in the area. Thirteen women began the strike by walking out and picketing. Graham said that women were scared after the strike vote, and shop management used intimidation tactics such as threatening to blacklist workers and claiming they would not be able to purchase medicine for their sick children. In addition, she said many workers felt pressure from their families not to strike so they would not lose their income. Police presence increased around the garment shops, and the Texas Dress Manufacturer’s Association, which owned all 13 shops, successfully used city anti-picketing ordinances to obtain injunctions against the protestors. The picketers taunted "scabs," strikebreakers entering the shops to work, and the scabs retaliated by "dumping hairset lotion, boxes of pins, or trash on the strikers." If protestors responded, Graham said they were arrested for picketing or disturbing the peace.

Finally, the union agreed to stop the protest as a condition for negotiation. When management refused to meet with them, picketers centralized, chaos ensued, and the “strike stripping” began when one scab was somehow left without clothes. Graham said the Dallas public frowned upon women picketing, and the community was not supportive. Although the union strike ended in November, the events were reported in many major newspapers including some in Italy and Australia.

== Strikes end, unions continue ==
The Industrial Commission of Texas advised Dallas dressmakers to formally recognize the ILGWU and settle with them. After being blacklisted in Dallas for her activities, Graham moved to Los Angeles and was part of a major union strike there. She returned to Dallas in 1941, and was hired by her old manager, Justin-McCarty Manufacturers, due to demand for skilled workers during the war. Graham continued her work with the ILGWU during this time.

In 1952 she moved with her husband to Washington D.C. after he was given a position with the International Brotherhood of Electrical Workers. When they retired in 1973, the couple moved back to Texas and continued their work in local organizations such as the National Association for the Advancement of Colored People and Community Chest.
