= The Lottie Project =

1997 novel by Jacqueline Wilson

- Cover of the 1997 first edition
- Author: Jacqueline Wilson
- Illustrator: Nick Sharratt
- Cover artist: Nick Sharratt
- Language: English
- Genre: Children's novel
- Publisher: Doubleday (first edition, hardback)
- Publication date: 1 May 1997 (first edition, hardback)
- Publication place: United Kingdom
- Media type: Print (hardback & paperback) and audiobook
- Pages: 203 pp (first edition, hardback)
- ISBN: 978-0-385-40703-8 (first edition, hardback)
- OCLC: 43219159

The Lottie Project is a children's novel by English author Jacqueline Wilson. It is illustrated by Nick Sharratt. The book is different from most Jacqueline Wilson books, as they are mostly told by characters who are not popular in school and are usually bullied by the popular students.

== Plot ==
Charlotte Alice Katherine Enright (who prefers to be called Charlie, but is called Charlotte by her current teacher) is an eleven-year-old girl who lives with her mother, Jo, in a flat. She is the most popular girl in her school and because of that, she has a lot of friends. And of which her two best friends are called Angela Robinson and Lisa Field. When her class's form teacher, Mrs. Thomas, goes on maternity leave, she is replaced by a strict woman called Miss Beckworth, whom Charlie immediately dislikes. She insists on calling the class by their birth names, including addressing Charlie as Charlotte (even though that Charlie explained that everybody calls her Charlie) and she also forces Charlie to sit next to an intelligent boy, James "Jamie" Edwards, whom Charlie hates. Miss Beckworth sets the class a history project on the Victorians, and Charlie assumes that the topic will be boring and decides not to listen for the first lesson – until she finds a picture of a Victorian servant girl who looks just like her. Charlie decides to write a diary, told from the point of view of her character Lottie who is eleven years old, like Charlie; however she has left school to become a servant!

Jo loses her job as a shop manageress (who used to be in charge of a staff of twelve, at Elite Electricals) and has to take up cleaning in a supermarket, cleaning houses, and looking after a young boy called Robin to earn money to pay for her flat and mortgage. Jo takes a shine to Robin's single father, Mark, much to Charlie's despair - though Jo insists he is just a friend. Following a trip to a theme park, Charlie and Robin witness Mark and Jo kissing on a ride - though and they are both embarrassed afterwards. Charlie, upset by this, tells Robin that neither of his parents (Robin's mother's new partner does not get on with Robin) want him any more. Distressed, Robin runs away, leaving Mark and Jo distraught for the boy's safety, and Charlie guilt-ridden.

In a subplot, Lottie, the servant girl Charlie had created, gets a job as a nursery maid, looking after three young and very irritating children – Victor, Louisa and baby Freddie. Whilst at the park, Freddie is snatched from his pram after Lottie angrily storms off. Lottie is upset and distressed at the loss of the little boy, mirroring Charlie's own feelings towards the disappearance of Robin.

Robin is found in a train station behind packages waiting to be delivered. He is freezing and is rushed to hospital. Mark is very upset with Charlie (after she admits to him, Jo and the police what she had said to Robin) and even though Charlie is relieved that Robin is no longer missing, she is still distraught as he catches pneumonia. When Robin gets better the four of them go on a second, more successful, outing together to the south coast. The Victorian project was co-won by Jamie and Charlie - both won book tokens and also Jamie won a tin soldier and Charlie won a Frozen Charlotte.

== Awards and nominations ==
- 1998, Stockport School's Book Award, winner.
- 1998, Sheffield Children's Book Award, highly commended.
- 1998, Oak Tree Award, Nottingham Children's Book Award, shortlisted.
- 1998, Red House Children's Book Award, shortlisted.

== Theatrical adaptation ==
The story has also been adapted for the stage by former Words and Pictures host Vicky Ireland and was first performed in 1999 at Polka Theatre, Wimbledon, England.

== Release details ==
- 1997, United Kingdom, Doubleday, ISBN 0-385-40703-3 & ISBN 978-0-385-40703-8, 1 May 1997, hardback
- 1998, United Kingdom, Corgi, ISBN 0-440-86366-X & ISBN 978-0-440-86366-3, 4 June 1998, paperback
- 1998, United Kingdom, Chivers Children's Audio Books, ISBN 0-7540-5036-X & ISBN 978-0-7540-5036-0, March 1998, compact cassette
- 2006, United Kingdom, BBC Audiobooks, ASIN 1846070910, 3 April 2006, compact disc
- Also published in other countries
- 2010, Book of the month in The Official Jacqueline Wilson Mag
