= Charlotte Béquignon-Lagarde =

Charlotte Béquignon-Lagarde (October 8, 1900, Lille - April 2, 1993, Veyrier-du-Lac) was the first woman law graduate of Caen University who was awarded an LL.D.

Béquignon-Lagarde was the only woman on the French Court of Cassation. She was also a member of the Conflict Tribunal from 1959, and vice-president of that court until 1965.

== Biography ==
Charlotte Béquignon is the granddaughter of a teacher and the daughter of an inspector in the Caen academy. After passing her baccalauréat, Charlotte Béquignon-Lagarde enrolled in the Faculty of Law at the University of Caen Normandy, graduating in 1922. She continued her studies in private law, defending her thesis on “Foreign currency debt” in 1925.

She taught law in Rennes from 1928 to 1944, during which time she was the first woman to obtain the agrégation in private law, at the age of 31.

On April 11, 1946, a law was passed stipulating that “any French citizen of either sex may be appointed to the judiciary”. Charlotte Béquignon-Lagarde was admitted to the judiciary by decree on October 10, 1946, under a provision allowing the appointment of a university professor to the Court of Cassation (France). She was assigned to the Social Division. She became the first woman magistrate in France.

In 1946, she was made an Ordre des Palmes académiques, in 1948 a Chevalier de la Légion d'Honneur and in 1949 an Honorary Fellowship of Smith College.

She was also a member of the Tribunal des conflits from 1959, then its vice-president until 1965.

She died on April 2, 1993.

== See also ==
- First women lawyers around the world
