= Charlotte Booth =

British archaeologist and egyptologist

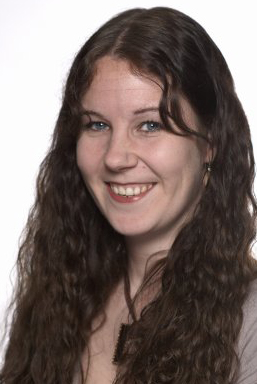
- Born: 6 April 1975 (age 51)
- Known for: Contributions to Egyptian archaeology

Academic background
- Education: University College London; University of Birmingham
- Thesis: Excavating paper squeezes: identifying the value of nineteenth and early twentieth century squeezes of ancient Egyptian monuments, through the collections of seven UK archives (2018)
- Doctoral advisor: Martin Bommas

Charlotte Booth (born 6 April 1975) is a British archaeologist and writer on ancient Egypt.

== Biography ==
Booth earned both her Bachelor's and her master's degrees in Egyptian Archaeology at University College London. After graduating, Booth started teaching for Birkbeck, University of London. Her focus of study at university was the Hyksos period of Egypt. In 2018, she received her Doctor of Philosophy (PhD) degree from the University of Birmingham: her doctoral thesis was titled "Excavating paper squeezes: identifying the value of nineteenth and early twentieth century squeezes of ancient Egyptian monuments, through the collections of seven UK archives".

She also provides online lessons on various topics of Egyptian history, like hieroglyphics, a day in Ancient Egypt, etc., on her online learning website, CharlotteEgypt. She has written a number of non-academic books about various aspects of Egyptology.

In 2015 she worked for Museum of London Archaeology (MOLA) as an on site archaeologist at the Bedlam dig Liverpool Street, London.

She has also appeared on several history television programs, including: Channel 5 (UK) "Cleopatra: Mother, Mistress, Murderer, Queen", which aired April 2016; The History Channel's "Sex in the Ancient World – Egyptian Erotica" which aired in 2009; and also on The Paul O'Grady Show – "Mummification", which aired in 2006.

== Publications ==
- Charlotte Booth: How to Survive in Ancient Egypt (Pen & Sword Books Ltd, 2020) ISBN 978-1-5267-53496
- Charlotte Booth: Hypatia: Mathematician, Philosopher, Myth (Stroud, Gloucestershire Fonthill Media, 2017) ISBN 978-1-7815-55460
- Charlotte Booth: The Pyramids in a Nutshell (2016) ISBN 978-8-4944-89310
- Charlotte Booth: In Bed with the Ancient Egyptians (Stroud, Gloucestershire Amberley Publishing, 2015) 288 pp. ISBN 978-1-4456-43434
- Charlotte Booth: Lost Voices of the Nile: Everyday Life in Ancient Egypt (Amberley Publishing, 2015) 304 pp. ISBN 978-1-4456-42857
- Charlotte Booth: An Illustrated Introduction to Ancient Egypt (Stroud, Gloucestershire : Amberley, 2014.) 93 pp. ISBN 978-1-4456-33657
- Charlotte Booth: The Myth of Ancient Egypt (Stroud : Amberley, 2011.) 192 pp. ISBN 978-1-4456-0274-5
- Charlotte Booth: The Nile and Its People: 7000 Years of Egyptian History (Stroud : History Press, 2010.) 191 pp. ISBN 0-7524-5506-0
- Charlotte Booth: Horemheb: The Forgotten Pharaoh (Stroud, Gloucestershire : Amberley, 2009) 160 pp, ISBN 1-84868-687-0
- Charlotte Booth: The Curse of the Mummy: And Other Mysteries of Ancient Egypt (Oxford : Oneworld, 2009.) 211 pp. ISBN 1-85168-606-1
- Charlotte Booth: Traveller's Guide to the Ancient World: Egypt: In the Year 1200 BCE (Traveller's Guide to the Ancient World) (2008) ISBN 0-7153-2921-9
- Charlotte Booth: The Boy Behind the Mask: Meeting the Real Tutankhamun (Oxford, England : Oneworld Publications, 2007.) 176 pages. ISBN 1-85168-544-8
- Charlotte Booth: The Ancient Egyptians for Dummies (John Wiley, 2007). ISBN 0-470-06544-3
- Charlotte Booth: People of Ancient Egypt (Stroud : Tempus, 2006.) 288 pp. ISBN 0-7524-3927-8
- Charlotte Booth: The Hyksos period in Egypt. (Princes Risborough, Shire 2005). 56 pp. ISBN 0-7478-0638-1
- Charlotte Booth: The role of Foreigners in Ancient Egypt. Oxford, England : Archaeopress, 2005 76pp. ISBN 9781841718651

== See also ==
- List of Egyptologists
