= Lilo (footballer, born 1902) =

Spanish footballer (1902–1972)

Personal information
- Full name: Manuel Rodríguez Pazó
- Date of birth: 8 April 1902
- Place of birth: Vigo, Spain
- Date of death: 2 September 1972 (aged 70)
- Place of death: Vigo, Spain
- Position: Goalkeeper

Youth career
- Germania

Senior career*
Years	Team	Apps	(Gls)
1918–1920	Club Ciosvín		
1920–1923	Fortuna de Vigo		
1923–1936	Celta de Vigo		
- * Club domestic league appearances and goals

Manuel Rodríguez Pazó, better known as Lilo (8 April 1902 – 2 September 1972), was a Spanish footballer who played as a goalkeeper for Celta de Vigo between 1923 and 1936.

== Career ==
Born on 8 April 1902 in the Galician town of Vigo, Lilo began his career playing as a right back for Germania, a team from the Vigo neighborhood of Couto, making his debut under the sticks only because his team's goalkeeper got injured, and he ended up enjoying so much that he signed for Club Ciosvín as a goalkeeper. In 1920, the 18-year-old Lilo joined Fortuna de Vigo, with whom he played for three years, until 1923, when it was merged with Real Vigo Sporting to form Celta de Vigo.

On 16 September 1923, the presentation match of Celta de Vigo was held at Coia, in a meeting between A and B teams, with Lilo starting for the latter team in a 2–0 loss, being beaten only by a penalty and an own goal. The goalkeeper of the A-team, Isidro Rodríguez, was thus the one selected for Celta's first official game against Boavista on 23 September (8–2), but following his controversial move to Deportivo de La Coruña, Lilo established himself as Celta's undisputed starting goalkeeper.

On 10 April 1924, Lilo played a friendly match for Celta against the Uruguay national team, who went on to win the 1924 Summer Olympics in Paris. Together with Polo Pardo, the Clemente brothers (Juanito, Balbino), Ramón González, he was part of the newly founded Celta team that won three Galician Championships in a row between 1923 and 1926. He went on to win a further four such titles in 1930, 1932, 1934, and 1935. In his last season at the club in 1935–36, Lilo did not play a single league match as Celta won the 1935–36 Segunda División, thus achieving promotion to the top flight for the first time in the club's history.

== Death ==
Lilo died in Vigo on 2 September 1972, at the age of 71, and as a tribute, Celta's players wore black armbands in their next match against Espanyol.

== Honours ==
Fortuna de Vigo

- Galician Championship:
  - Winners (2) 1920–21 and 1921–22

Celta de Vigo

- Galician Championship:
  - Winners (7) 1923–24, 1924–25, 1925–26, 1929–30, 1931–32, 1933–34, and 1934–35
