= James Hervey Herron =

American engineer (1875–1948)

James Hervey Herron Jr. (January 4, 1875 – March 29, 1948) was an American mechanical and consulting engineer, metallurgist, and founding president of the James H. Herron Company of Cleveland. He served as president of the American Society of Mechanical Engineers in 1937-38.

== Biography ==
=== Youth and early education ===
Herron Jr. was born in Girard, Pennsylvania, to James Hervey Herron Sr. and Josephine (Fuller) Herron. He obtained his BSc. in mechanical engineering from the University of Michigan in 1899. Later in 1916-17 and 1920-21 he was student at the Graduated School of the University of Michigan.

Herron had started working in 1889 as apprentice in the sawmill machinery maker Stearns Manufacturing Co. in Erie, Pa. From 1895 to 1897 he was assistant and chief engineer at the Erie City Iron Works.

=== Further career ===
After his graduation in 1899 Herron was draftsman and assistant manager at the Cambria Iron Company for three years; chief engineer at Bury Compressor Company in Erie, Pa. for three years; manager at the Motch & Merryweather Machinery Co, in Detroit for three years; and chief engineer and manager of works at Detroit Steel Products Company for another three years from 1907 to 1909.

In 1910 Herron opened his own consulting engineering firm James H. Herron Company of Cleveland, Ohio. The company provided serves in the fields of chemical engineering, metallurgy, power plan design, etc. After Herron's death in 1948, his nephew and metallurgist Lewis F. Herron took over the business, and in 1997 it was sold to the Dutch Stork B.V., creating the Stork Herron Testing Laboratories.

In 1936 Herron was elected president of the American Society of Mechanical Engineers for 1937-38. In 1943 he was awarded the honorary DSc in Engineering by the Case School of Applied Science, now Case School of Engineering.
