= Charlotte F. Dailey =

American editor and exposition official (1842–1914)

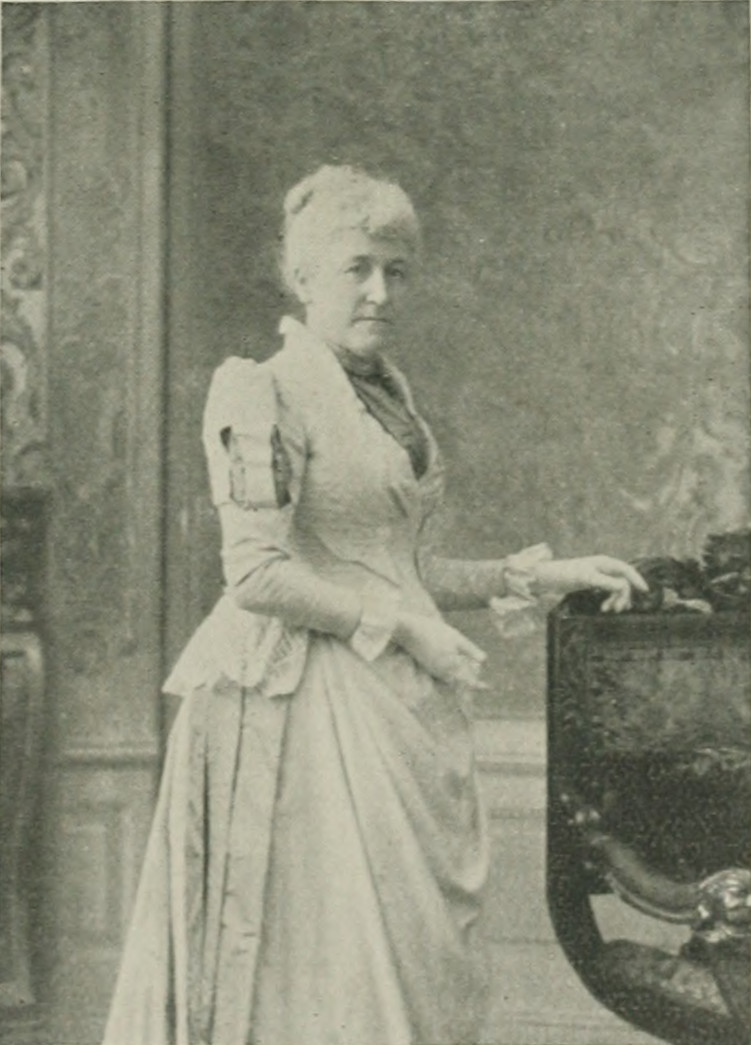
- Portrait photo from A Woman of the Century
- Born: Charlotte Field Dailey; December 19, 1842; Providence, Rhode Island, U.S.
- Died: May 14, 1914 (aged 71); Providence, Rhode Island, U.S.

Charlotte F. Dailey (December 19, 1842 – May 14, 1914) was an American editor and exposition official. She compiled the Rhode Island woman's directory and organized the correspondence of Sarah Helen Whitman. Dailey assisted in the editing of Edgar Allan Poe's writings and the preparation of his biography.

== Early life and education ==
Charlotte (nickname, "Lottie") Field Dailey was born in Providence, Rhode Island, on December 19, 1842. The name Dailey dates back four generations in Rhode Island and is found as early as 1680 in Easton, Massachusetts. Lottie's mother, Charlotte Burr (née, Field) Dailey, author of Report upon the disabled Rhode Island soldiers : their names, condition, and in what hospital they are. Made to His Excellency Gov. Sprague, and presented to the General Assembly of Rhode Island, January session, 1863, wrote under the pen name of "Mrs. Charlotte F. Dailey'. Lottie had a younger sister, Maude.

In advanced age, Sarah Helen Whitman came to live with the Dailey family. Lottie especially devoted herself to the elderly guest, and Whitman enjoyed recounting stories regarding distinguished people of her time, including the varied associations linked with Edgar Allan Poe's career. Lottie watched over Whitman when she died in 1878.

After graduating from Mme. C. Mears Burkhardt's Boarding School in New York City, she spent the next winter with friends in Cuba, benefiting from her knowledge of the Spanish language.

In 1867, she went to Europe with her parents to visit the Paris Exposition. She visited Italy, where her taste for art developed, and, after seeing Spain and the art treasures of that country, she discovered her ability to appreciate and recognize the great masters. Austria, Germany, Russia, Denmark, Sweden, and England were visited, and, wherever time permitted, her musical studies were pursued under masters, such as Allari, of Rome, and San Giovanni, of Milan.

== Career ==
Dailey was active in philanthropic work and artistic, dramatic, musical, and literary associations. The sudden death of her father, and with it the loss of fortune, made it necessary for her to support herself, which included giving lessons in vocal music and lectures on art.

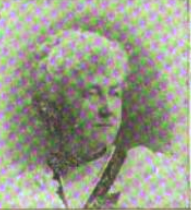
History of the World's Fair, 1893

Later, she spent her winters in Washington, D.C.

Her appointment to represent her State on the Board of Lady Managers of the World's Columbian Exposition (Chicago, 1893) Committee was followed by her appointment as secretary and treasurer of the Board of World's Fair Managers of Rhode Island. Bertha Palmer further assigned Dailey to the chair of fine arts, in oil painting, watercolor painting, and other departments. For this fair, Dailey also compiled the Rhode Island Woman's Directory, containing the names, addresses, and occupations of business and professional women in the State, and statistics regarding occupations.

Whitman's literary executor was William Francis Channing, but after his death, Whitman's literary remains were consigned to the care of Dailey, who, with her sister, Maude, went through the entire correspondence and noted its contents. Later, the sisters assisted Professor Harrison in his work of editing Poe's writings and preparing his biography.

== Death and legacy ==
Charlotte F. Dailey died in Providence, on May 14, 1914.

The "Charlotte Field Dailey Papers, 1883-1913." are held by the John Hay Library at Brown University.

== Selected works ==
=== Editor ===
- Rhode Island woman's directory (Rhode Island Woman's World's Fair Advisory Board, 1893)
