= Charlotte Angus =

American painter

Charlotte M. Angus
- Born: February 2, 1911; Kansas City, Missouri, US
- Died: May 12, 1989 (aged 78); Pulaski, Pennsylvania, US
- Occupation: American artist
- Spouse: John Stefanak

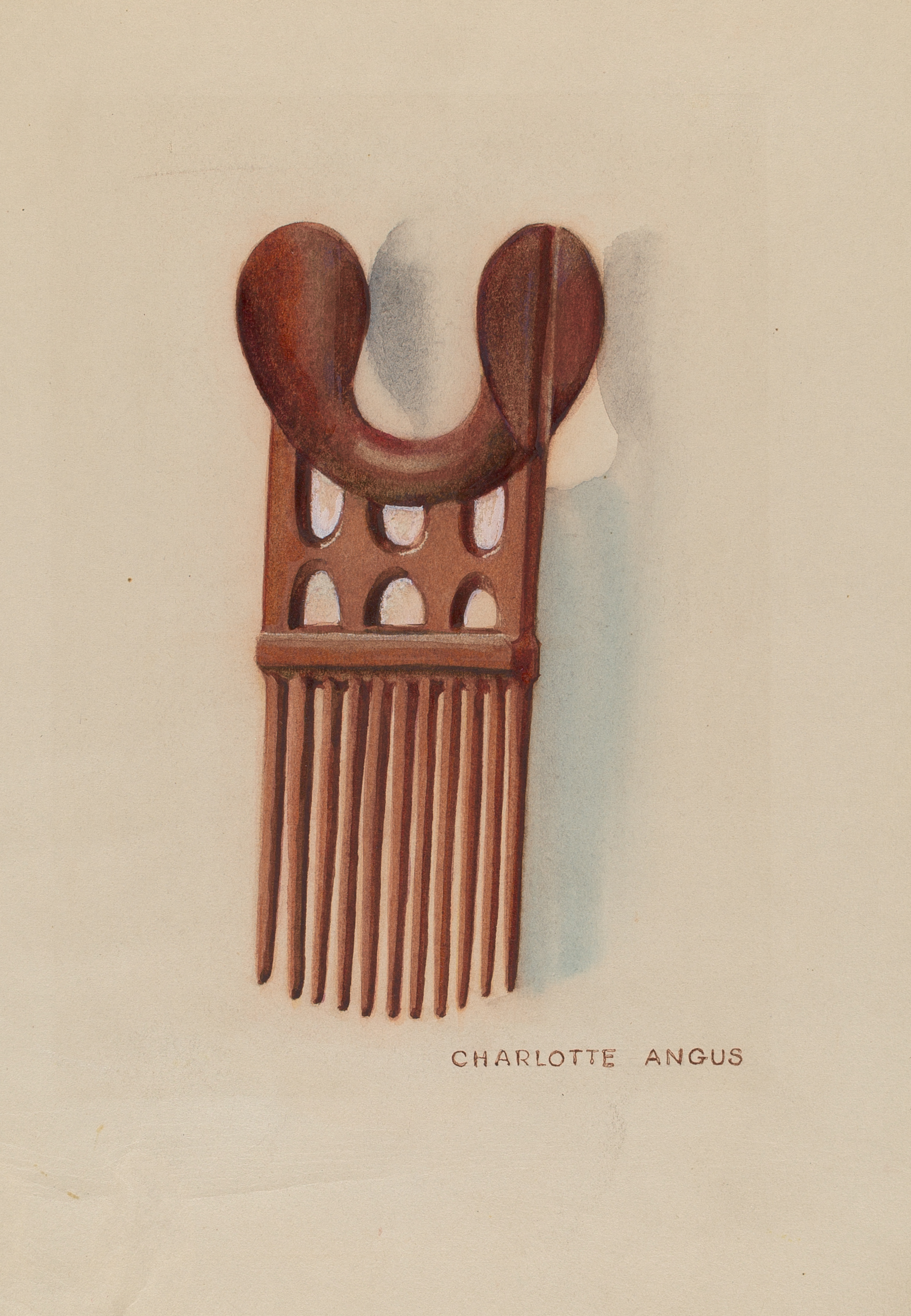
Wool Comb (c.1937), watercolor by Charlotte Angus for the Index of American Design

Charlotte Angus (February 2, 1911 – May 12, 1989) was an American artist.

== History ==
A native of Kansas City, Missouri, Angus moved to Philadelphia when young and grew up in that city. She studied at the University of the Arts and the Graphic Sketch Club there before taking a job with an advertising agency, which she lost due to the Great Depression. She then, in 1936, became involved with the Federal Art Project, beginning by painting sets for the Federal Theater Project and continuing by contributing to the Index of American Design. Angus created over 60 works, primarily watercolors and graphite drawings of historical objects for the index, from quilts to cast iron fencing designs. At the end of the project in 1942 she studied drafting, taking a position as a draftswoman at the Naval Air Medical Center in Philadelphia. She also created posters for the Works Progress Administration. Angus married John Stefanak in 1947 and settled with him in southwestern Pennsylvania, where she continued to exhibit her art. She died in Pulaski, Pennsylvania, and is buried in Saint Ann's Cemetery in Hermitage.

== Museum collections ==
A lithograph by Angus, Derelicts, is owned by the Spencer Museum of Art. Much of the work she produced for the Index of American Design is currently held by the National Gallery of Art. She also has work held at The Newark Museum of Art and the Philadelphia Museum of Art.

=== Gallery ===
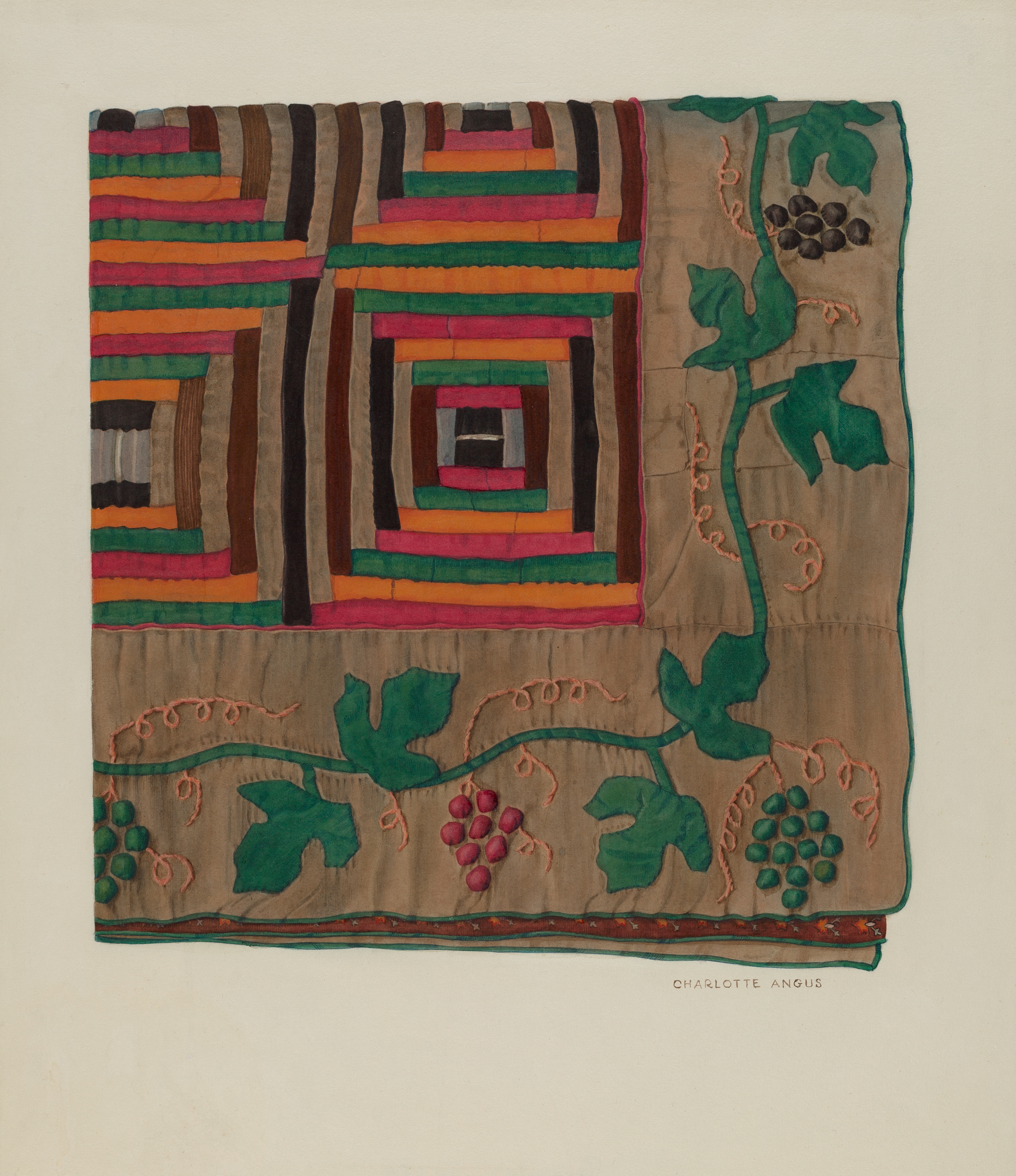
Charlotte Angus, Log Cabin Quilt, watercolor, 1935-1942, NGA

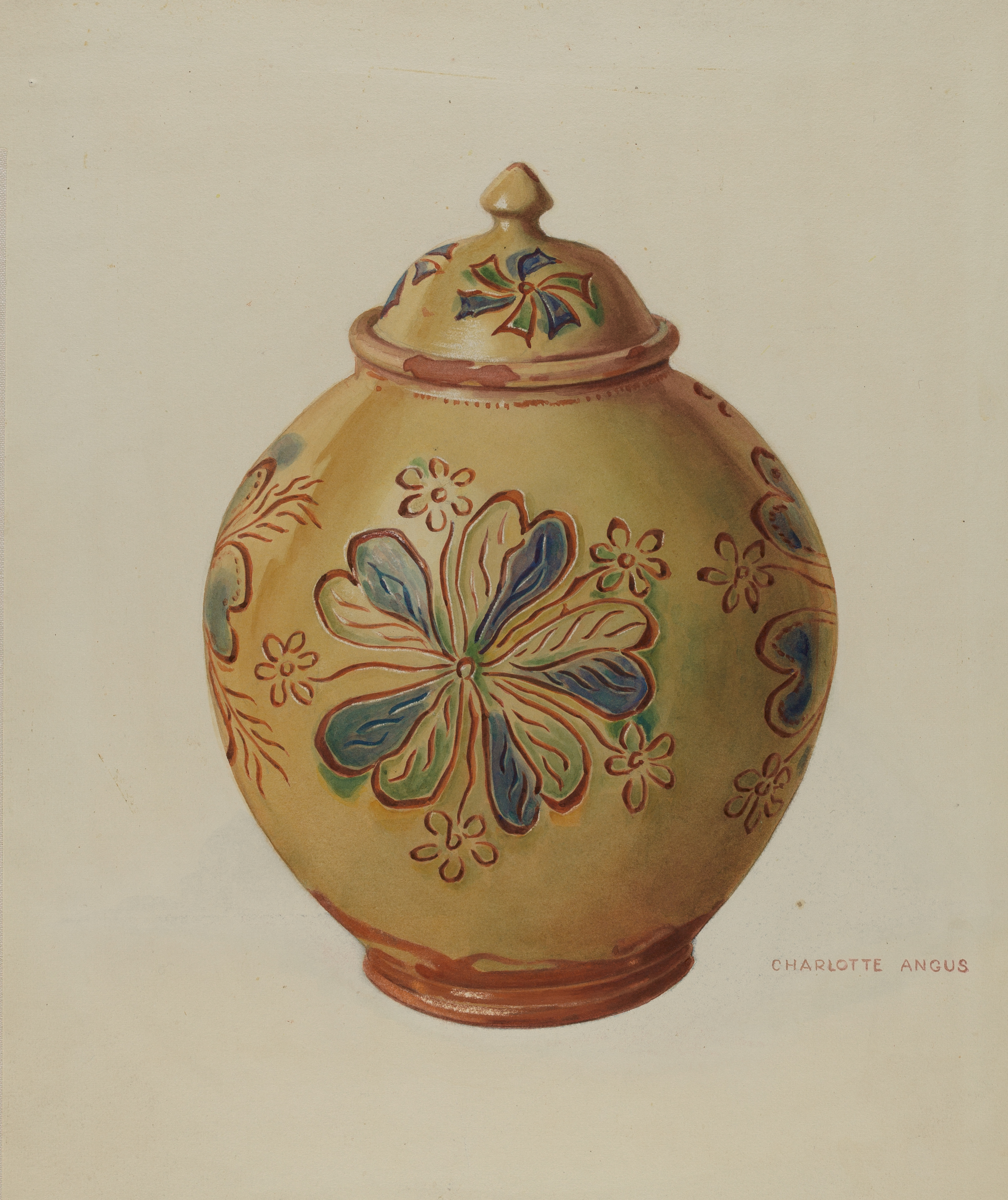
Charlotte Angus, Jar with Cover, watercolor, 1935-1942, NGA

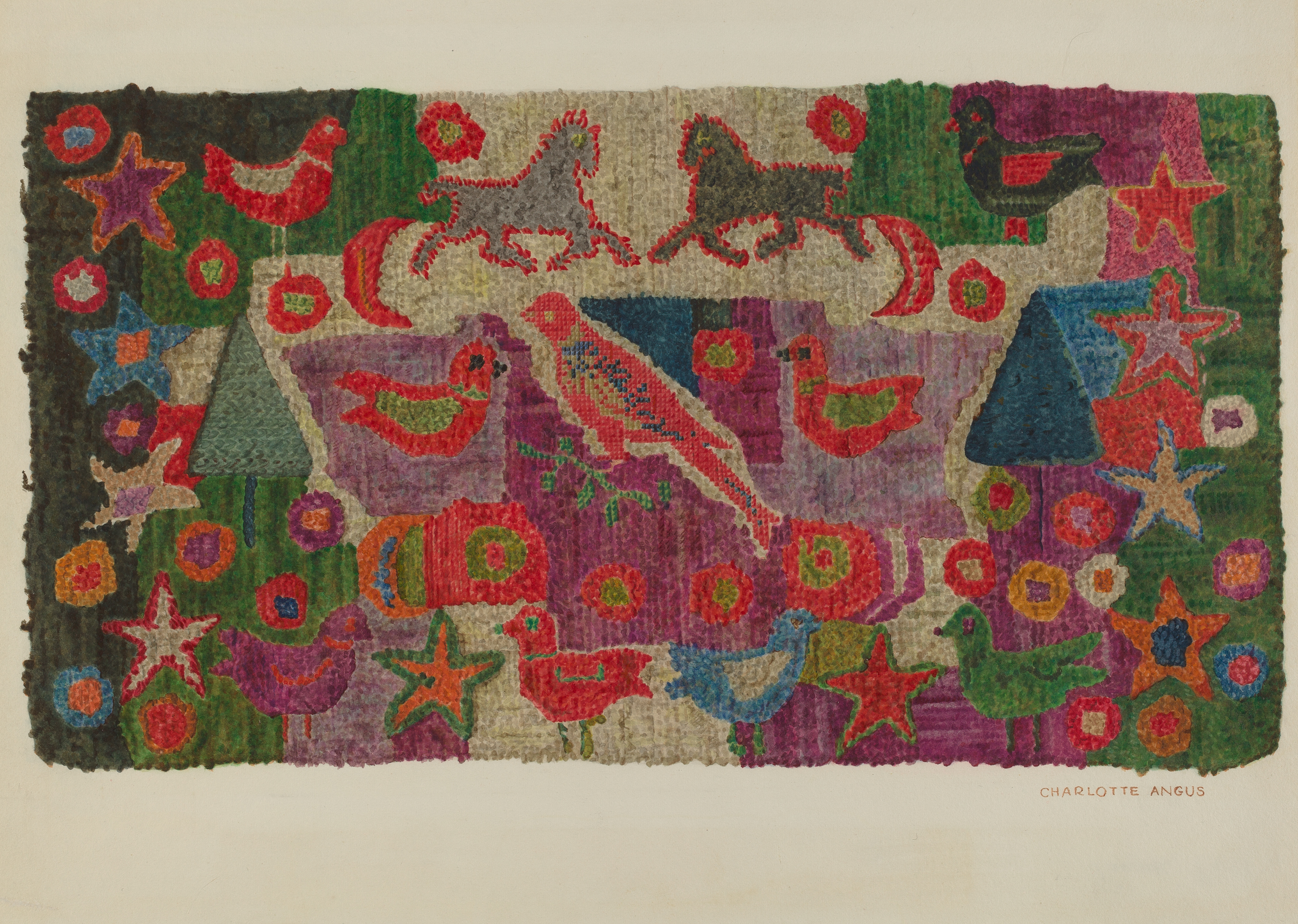
Charlotte Angus, Hooked Rug, watercolor, c. 1940, NGA

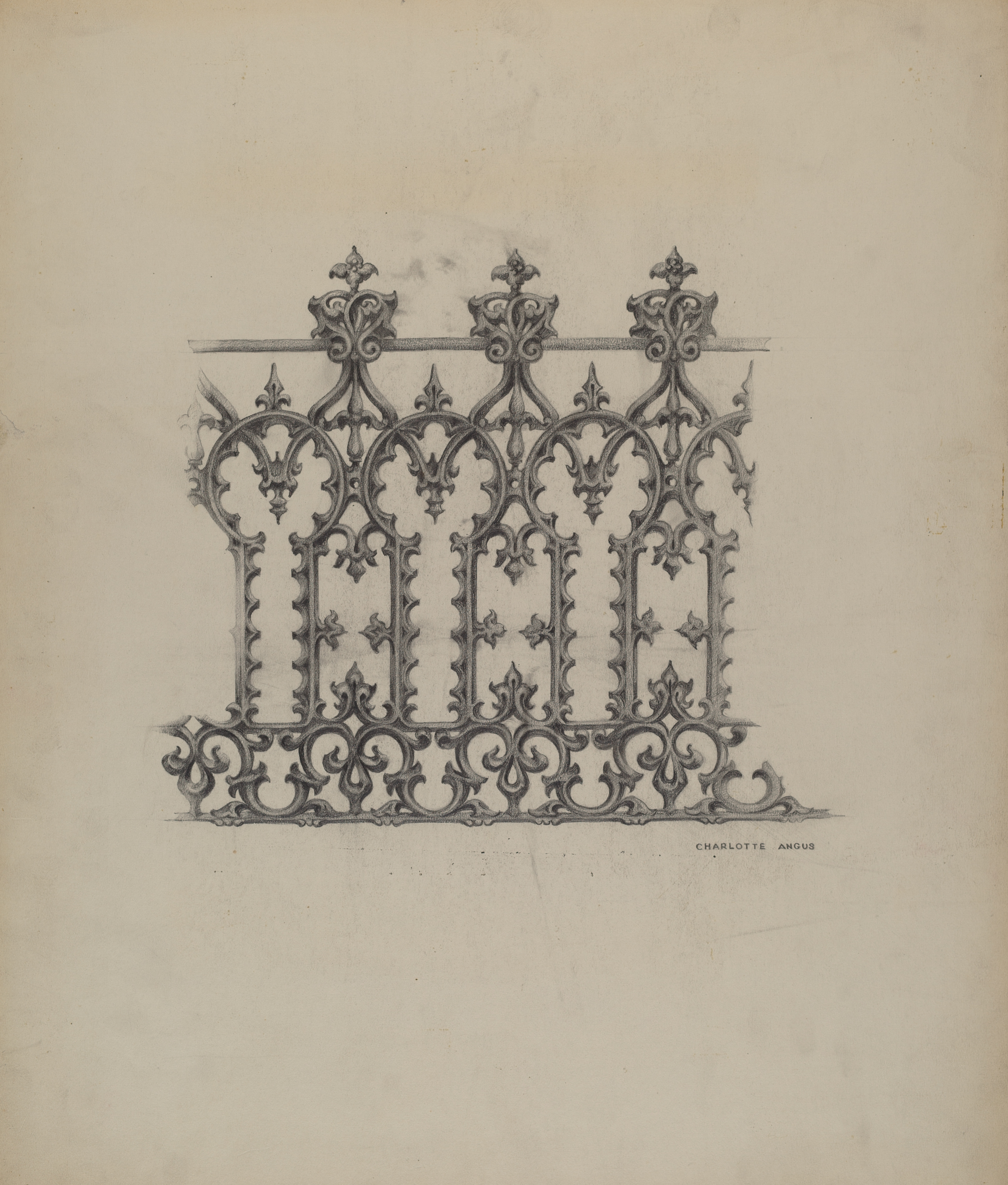
Charlotte Angus, Cast Iron Fence, graphite, c. 1937, NGA

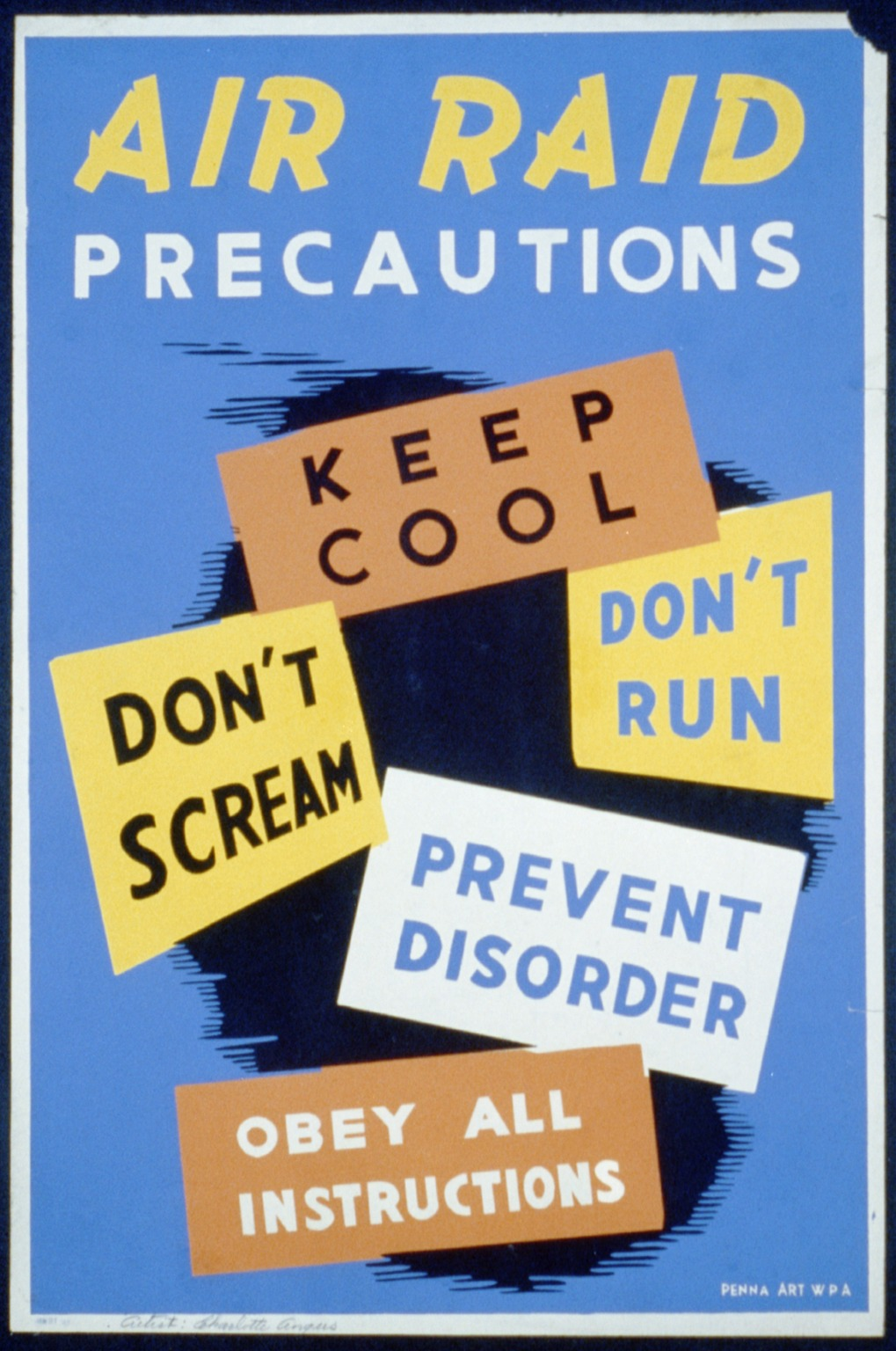
Charlotte Angus, Air Raid Precautions, silkscreen, c. 1942, LOC

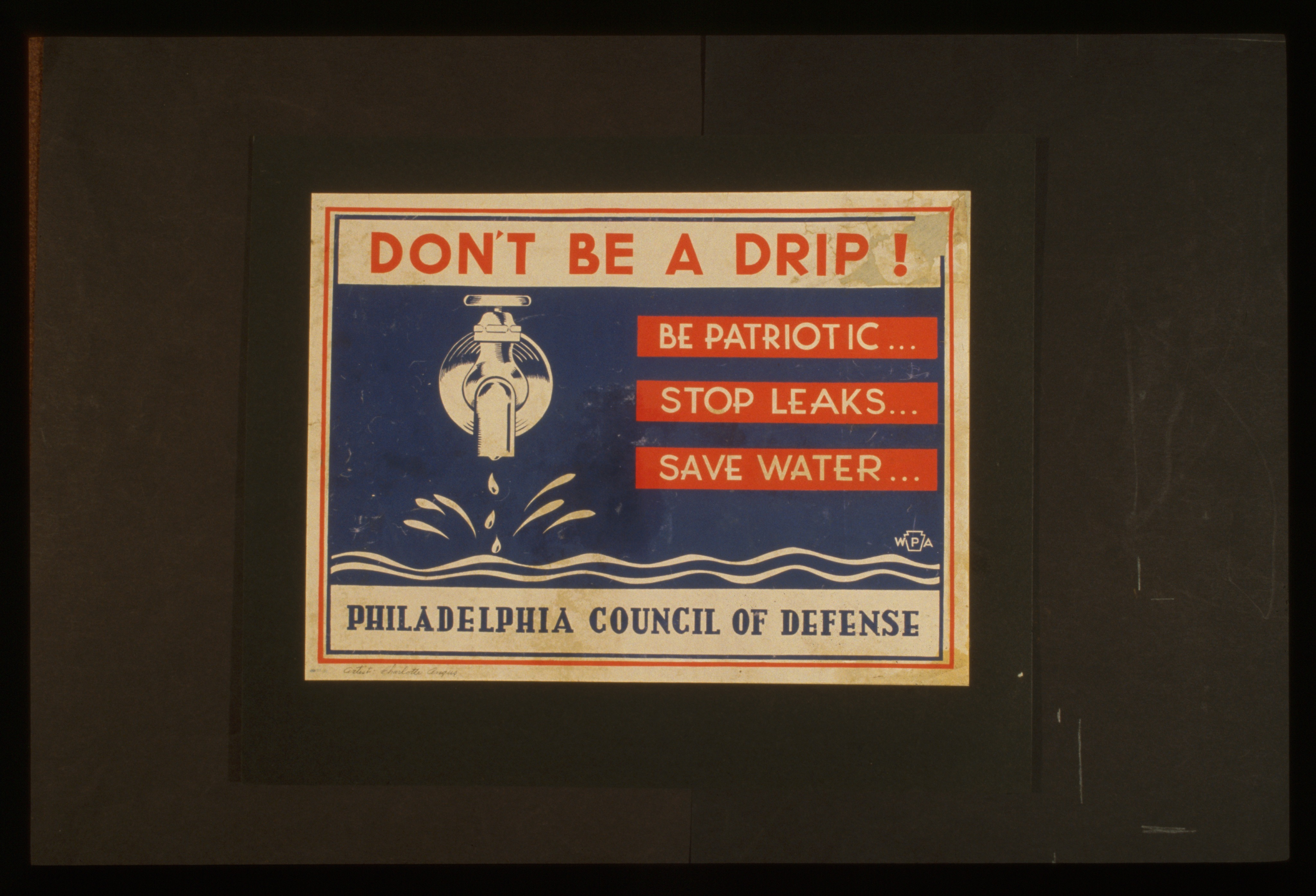
Charlotte Angus, Don't Be A Drip!, silkscreen, c. 1942, LOC
