= Girard, Pennsylvania =

Borough in Pennsylvania, US

- Borough
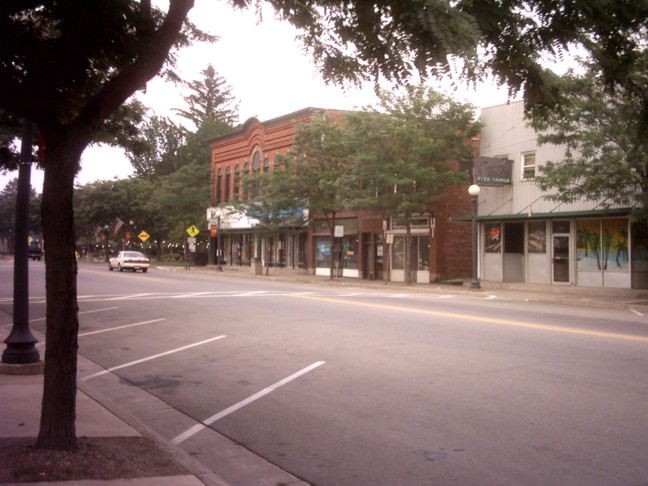
- Main Street of Girard

- Location in Erie County and the U.S. state of Pennsylvania.
- Coordinates: 42°0′21″N 80°19′17″W
- Country: United States
- State: Pennsylvania
- County: Erie

Government
  - Mayor: Peter Burton

Area
  - Total: 2.36 sq mi (6.12 km^{2})
  - Land: 2.34 sq mi (6.07 km^{2})
  - Water: 0.019 sq mi (0.05 km^{2})
- Elevation (center of borough): 777 ft (237 m)
- Highest elevation (southeast corner of borough): 870 ft (270 m)
- Lowest elevation (Elk Creek): 620 ft (190 m)

Population (2020)
  - Total: 2,993
  - Density: 1,277.1/sq mi (493.11/km^{2})
- Time zone: UTC-5 (EST)
  - Summer (DST): UTC-4 (EDT)
- ZIP code: 16417
- Area code: 814
- FIPS code: 42-29232
- Website: girardborough.com

Girard is a borough in Erie County, Pennsylvania, United States. The population had declined to 2,994 as of the 2020 census. As of the 2025 census estimates the population had declined further to 2,906. It is part of the Erie Metropolitan Statistical Area.

== History ==
Girard's history began with a petition to "Township Status" in 1832 by reassigning lands previously allocated to neighboring municipalities (Springfield, Fairview, and Elk Creek). The name is in honor of Stephen Girard, a banking tycoon of the late 1700s and early 1800s. Stephen Girard, a resident of Philadelphia at that time, was chosen for a variety of reasons. He owned much of the neighboring Springfield Township, and had been admired by the residents in the region. Additionally, Girard officials had been lobbying with Stephen Girard's foundation, upon his death in 1831, to be the site of the bequeathed Girard College. Despite this attempt, his family and will executors chose to establish the boarding school in Philadelphia where Stephen Girard had a long-standing tradition as a local philanthropist.

== Geography ==
Girard is located in western Erie County at 42°0′21″N 80°19′17″W (42.005954, -80.321481). It is bordered to the northwest by the borough of Lake City and on all other sides by Girard Township.

According to the United States Census Bureau, the borough has a total area of 2.4 square miles (6.1 km^{2}), of which 0.02 square miles (0.05 km^{2}), or 0.81%, is water. Elk Creek roughly follows the southwest border of the borough as it flows northwest to Lake Erie.

U.S. Route 20 passes through the borough as Main Street, leading northeast 4 miles (6 km) to Fairview and 15 miles (24 km) to Erie, and southwest 13 miles (21 km) to Conneaut, Ohio.

== Demographics ==
Historical population
Census	Pop.	Note	%±
1850	400		—
1860	616		54.0%
1870	704		14.3%
1880	703		−0.1%
1890	626		−11.0%
1900	954		52.4%
1910	1,165		22.1%
1920	1,242		6.6%
1930	1,554		25.1%
1940	1,732		11.5%
1950	2,141		23.6%
1960	2,451		14.5%
1970	2,613		6.6%
1980	2,615		0.1%
1990	2,879		10.1%
2000	3,164		9.9%
2010	3,104		−1.9%
2020	2,993		−3.6%
2025 (est.)	2,906	▼	−2.9%

As of the census of 2000, there were 3,164 people, 1,226 households, and 863 families residing in the borough. The population density was 1,345.0 inhabitants per square mile (519.3/km^{2}). There were 1,269 housing units at an average density of 539.4 per square mile (208.3/km^{2}). The racial makeup of the borough was 98.70% White, 0.38% African American, 0.28% Native American, 0.19% Asian, 0.22% from other races, and 0.22% from two or more races. Hispanic or Latino of any race were 0.60% of the population.

There were 1,226 households, out of which 37.2% had children under the age of 18 living with them, 51.5% were married couples living together, 13.7% had a female householder with no husband present, and 29.6% were non-families. 26.0% of all households were made up of individuals, and 13.2% had someone living alone who was 65 years of age or older. The average household size was 2.57 and the average family size was 3.10.

In the borough the population was spread out, with 29.4% under the age of 18, 6.9% from 18 to 24, 28.8% from 25 to 44, 21.6% from 45 to 64, and 13.4% who were 65 years of age or older. The median age was 36 years. For every 100 females there were 89.8 males. For every 100 females age 18 and over, there were 83.0 males.

The median income for a household in the borough was $33,977, and the median income for a family was $38,936. Males had a median income of $29,975 versus $23,712 for females. The per capita income for the borough was $16,682. About 6.5% of families and 8.3% of the population were below the poverty line, including 13.4% of those under age 18 and 5.2% of those age 65 or over.

== Notable people ==
- Jack Allen, professional baseball player
- Marc Blucas, actor
- Bones Ely, professional baseball player
- Emma Gillett, lawyer and women's rights activist
- James Hervey Herron, mechanical and consulting engineer, metallurgist
- James M. King, Methodist minister and anti-Catholic political organizer
- David K. MacEwen, 59th Adjutant General of the United States Army
- Curt Miller, professional women's basketball coach
- Luke Smalley, photographer
- Denman Thompson, playwright and theater actor
- Charlotte Elizabeth Battles, President of R. S. Battles Bank
