= Charlotte Read =

Conservationist for the Indiana Dunes

- Born: Charlotte Johnson; March 27, 1929; Chicago, IL
- Died: May 2, 2019 (aged 90); Chesterton, IN
- Education: University of Illinois, Urbana-Champaign (BS, Economics)
- Known for: Environmental activism in the Indiana Dunes
- Partner: Herbert Read (1952-present)
- Children: 5

Charlotte Read (March 27, 1929 – May 2, 2019) was an environmental activist, conservationist, and educator from Northwest Indiana. She was known for her efforts in advocacy to preserve the Indiana Dunes. Read was born to two Swedish immigrants in Chicago, Illinois. Her father was a building contractor and painter when she was young. She grew up near Jackson Park. She married her husband, Herbert Read, in the Indiana Dunes in 1952. In 1959, Charlotte and Herb moved to Indiana to live near the dunes to raise their two sons.

== Environmental activism ==
Read was an activist for the Indiana Dunes. She and her husband Herbert Read (Herb) started the Izaak Walton League's Porter County Chapter in 1958. In 1966, she and her husband helped establish the Dunes as a National Park after testifying before Congress.

In 1974, Charlotte became the first employee for Save the Dunes Council. She served as the Executive Director of Save the Dunes Council until 1992. She acted as an intermediary between the organization, the government, and other local conservation groups. She led the organization into successfully preserving Northwest Indiana's Dunes and Lake Michigan. She was also the first Executive Director of Shirley Heinz Environmental Fund, now called as Shirley Heinz Land Trust.

She is known as one of a few "Wonder Women of the Dunes" for her conservation work, alongside women such as Alice Gray/Diana of the Dunes, Dorothy Buell and Irene Herlocker-Meyer.
