= Liselott Willén =

Finnish writer

Liselott Kärrfalk (née Carlsson; born 1972), best known for her work under her previous married name Liselott Willén, is a Swedish-Finnish author from Åland.

Her 2017 novel Det Finns Inga Monster, one of several novels Willén set in her homeland of Åland, was nominated for the Nordic Council Literature Prize in 2019.

== Biography ==
Liselott Willén was born Liselott Carlsson in 1972. While she was born in Stockholm, she was raised from a very young age in the autonomous Åland Islands region of Finland. After growing up in Åland, she moved to Sweden, where she now lives in Örebro.

She began writing fiction, and her debut novel, Sten för Sten, received critical acclaim on its publication in 2001. It was followed by the novels Eldsmärket (2003), Islekar (2008), and Ingenstans Under Himlen (2011). Willén's work is frequently set in her homeland of Åland, including Eldsmärket and 2013's Jakthistorier.

Her 2017 novel Det Finns Inga Monster ("There Are No Monsters") was nominated for the Nordic Council Literature Prize in 2019. The novel, set in Åland, tells of a family dealing with the wounds of the past and repressed memories.

Willén writes in Swedish. Her work "painlessly def[ies] the boundaries between different genres," but it is generally categorized as crime fiction or psychological thriller.

She is also trained as a doctor, having studied at the Karolinska Institute, and she continues to balance her writing with her medical practice.

== Selected works ==
- Sten för Sten (2001)
- Eldsmärket (2003)
- Islekar (2008)
- Ingenstans under himlen (2011)
- Jakthistorier (2013)
- Det Finns Inga Monster (2017)
