= Charlotte Bolles Anthony =

American women's rights activist and suffragist

- Born: Charlotte Bolles; August 18, 1841
- Died: July 8, 1877 (aged 35)
- Other names: Lottie B. Anthony
- Occupation: teacher
- Known for: women's rights activism, suffragism
- Spouse: Daniel B. Anthony

Charlotte Bolles Anthony (August 18, 1841 – July 8, 1877) was an American women's rights activist and suffragist. Anthony was one of 14 women arrested with Susan B. Anthony after they illegally voted in Rochester, N.Y. on November 5, 1872.

"Lottie" as she was known, began teaching at age 14. She also was known for her fine singing voice, and performed in concerts for local charities. In 1866, she married Daniel B. Anthony, a third cousin of Susan B. Anthony. The couple had four children, and they lived at 101 West Avenue. Southern University's College Administration Building in Baton Rouge, Louisiana was named Lottie Anthony Hall in her honor. Lottie was one of the 14 women arrested with Susan B. Anthony after they illegally voted in Rochester, N.Y. on November 5, 1872. Charlotte influenced women's rights activism and voting in the United States during the late 19th and early 20th centuries.
