= Charlotte Lily Baidoo =

Ghanaian banker and the chief executive officer

- Occupation: Banker

Charlotte Lily Baidoo is a Ghanaian banker and the chief executive officer (CEO) of the Women's World Banking Ghana (WWBG). She joined the Women's World Bank (Ghana) as the chief executive officer (CEO) in 2015.

In 2017, Charlotte Baidoo received an honorable fellow award from the Institute of Certified Economist of Ghana (ICEG).

She was also nominated among the top 60 Corporate women leaders in Ghana by African Network of Entrepreneurs' flagship network called 'WomanRising'.

== See also ==
- Women's World Banking
