= Charlotte Alice Baker =

American historian, journalist, and teacher

C. Alice Baker
- Born: April 11, 1833; Springfield, Massachusetts, U.S.
- Died: 1909 (aged 75–76)
- Education: Deerfield Academy
- Occupations: Historian, journalist and teacher

Charlotte Alice Baker (April 11, 1833 – 1909), was an American historian, journalist, and teacher.

Baker was born in Springfield, Massachusetts. She was home educated until age 11 and then attended a local school and then the Deerfield Academy, where she was one of only two female students. Together with one of her friends, Baker founded a school in Chicago, Illinois, in 1856, but had to close it eight years later when she had to return home to assist her mother. She then began to write book reviews and articles on botany, art, and women's work for magazines and newspapers. Baker also wrote a children's series entitled, Pictures from French and English History. She became interested in the 1704 Raid on Deerfield where French and Native American forces attacked the English frontier settlement at Deerfield, Massachusetts, taking 112 settlers captive to Montreal, French Canada.

Baker made multiple trips to Canada to research in the official records and visited villages and Indian missions. She read a paper, Eunice Williams, the Captive, before the Pocumtuck Valley Memorial Association and then published True Stories of New England Captives Carried to Canada During the Old French and Indian Wars in 1897. Baker "found eighteen Deerfield captives and identified many more whose fate had been unknown. She became known as an expert in New England history and was invited to join the New York, Cambridge, and Montreal Historical Societies." Baker prepared a series of lectures on early American History for Boston school children at the request of another historian before her death in 1909.
