= Lieselotte =

- Gender: Female
- Language: German

Other names
- Variant forms: Liselotte, Liselott
- Nicknames: Liesl, Lotte, Lottie, Lilo
- Related names: Charlotte, Elizabeth

Lieselotte is a German feminine given name. It is derived from a combination of the names Lise, a diminutive form of Elisabeth, and Lotte, a diminutive of Charlotte. Liselotte is a spelling variant also in regular use in countries such as Sweden. Diminutive forms of Lieselotte include Liesl, Lotte, and Lilo.

== People with the name Lieselotte ==
- Lieselotte "Lotte" Berk (1913–2003), German dancer and teacher
- Lieselotte Breker (1960–2022), German sport shooter
- Lieselotte Feikes (1923–2008), German chemist
- Lieselotte "Lilo" Ramdohr (1913–2013), German World War II era member of the White Rose student resistance group
- Lieselotte Templeton (1918–2009), German-American crystallographer
- Lieselotte Thoms-Heinrich (1920–1992), German journalist and feminist
- Lieselotte Van Lindt (born 1989), Belgian field hockey player

== Fictional characters ==
- Lieselotte Achenbach, from the video game series Arcana Heart
- Lieselotte Sherlock, from the anime/manga Trinity Seven
- Lieselotte Riefenstahl, from the anime/light novel Endo and Kobayashi Live! The Latest on Tsundere Villainess Lieselotte

== See also ==
- Liselotte
- Liselott
