= Charlotte =

Charlotte most commonly refers to:

- Charlotte (given name)
  - Princess Charlotte (disambiguation)
  - Queen Charlotte (disambiguation)
- Charlotte, North Carolina, United States, a city
- Charlotte (cake), a type of dessert

Charlotte may also refer to:

== Arts and entertainment ==
- Charlotte (Charlotte's Web), a barn spider from the 1952 children's book by E. B. White

=== Film and television ===
- Charlotte (1974 film), a French crime thriller
- Wakakusa no Charlotte, an anime series from 1977
- Charlotte (1981 film), a Dutch film by Frans Weisz
- Charlotte (2021 film), an animated drama film
- Charlotte (TV series), an anime television series

=== Music ===
- Charlotte (album), a 1999 album by Charlotte Nilsson
- Charlotte (American band), a hard rock band
- Charlotte (Japanese band), a pop punk band
- Charlotte (singer), British singer-songwriter, composer, arranger, and record producer
- "Charlotte", a 1969 song by Jimmy McGriff from A Thing to Come By
- "Charlotte", a 1982 song by Wendy Wu
- "Charlotte" (Kittie song) (2000)
- "Charlotte" (Air Traffic song) (2007)
- "Charlotte", a 2008 song by Booka Shade

=== Other arts and entertainment ===
- Charlotte, the statuette awarded for the Women's Prize for Non-Fiction

== Places ==
=== Australia ===
- Charlotte, Northern Territory, a locality

=== Canada ===
- Charlotte County, New Brunswick
- Charlotte (1785–1974 electoral district), in New Brunswick
- Charlotte (electoral district), a federal electoral district renamed New Brunswick Southwest
- Charlotte (provincial electoral district), for the Legislative Assembly of New Brunswick from 1994 to 2006

=== Saint Vincent and the Grenadines ===
- Charlotte Parish, Saint Vincent and the Grenadines

=== United States ===
- Charlotte, Illinois, an unincorporated community
- Charlotte, Iowa, a city
- Charlotte, Maine, a town
- Charlotte, Michigan, a city
- Charlotte, New York, a town
- Charlotte, North Carolina, a city
- Charlotte, Rochester, New York, a neighborhood
- Charlotte, Tennessee, a town
- Charlotte, Texas, a city
- Charlotte, Vermont, a town
- Charlotte County (disambiguation), including one in colonial America
- Roman Catholic Diocese of Charlotte, in North Carolina

== Schools ==
- Charlotte Christian School, a private Christian prep school in Charlotte, North Carolina
- Charlotte High School (disambiguation)
- University of North Carolina at Charlotte

== Ships ==
- List of ships named Charlotte, including:
  - HMS Charlotte, several Royal Navy ships
  - USS Charlotte, several US Navy ships

== Sports ==
=== Teams based in Charlotte, North Carolina ===
- Charlotte 49ers, the athletics teams of the University of North Carolina at Charlotte
- Charlotte Checkers (disambiguation), various defunct ice hockey teams
- Charlotte FC, a Major League Soccer team
- Charlotte Hornets (disambiguation), various sports teams
- Charlotte Independence, an American soccer team
- Charlotte Sting, a Women's National Basketball Association team from 1997 to 2007

=== Other sports ===
- Charlotte (figure skating), a spiral move
- Charlotte (horse), a British Thoroughbred racehorse
- Charlotte Motor Speedway, a motorsport complex in Concord, North Carolina

== Other uses ==
- List of storms named Charlotte, various tropical cyclones
- The Charlotte, a pub and concert venue in Leicester, England

== See also ==
- Carlota (disambiguation)
- Carlotta (disambiguation)
- Charlott
- Charlotta
- Charlotte Russe (retailer)
- Port Charlotte (disambiguation)
- Sophia Charlotte (disambiguation)
- Sophie Charlotte (disambiguation)
