= Hornet (disambiguation) =

A hornet is an insect. It may also refer to:

== Insects ==
- American wasps, colloquially, particularly the bald-faced hornet
- Certain Australian potter wasp species, colloquially, including the Australian hornet

== Arts and media ==
=== Fictional characters ===
- Hornet (Hollow Knight), a video game arachnid hybrid
- Hornet (comics), a name shared by three Marvel characters
- Hornet (DC Thomson), a British comic of the 1960s-1970s
- Hornet Squadron, an RAF squadron in a series of books by Derek Robinson
- Hornet (Gobots), an alien cyborg shapeshifter
- Robot henchmen in Buzz Lightyear of Star Command

=== Student newspapers ===
- The Hornet, the student newspaper of Delaware State University
- The Hornet, the student newspaper of Fullerton College
- The State Hornet, the student newspaper of California State University, Sacramento

== Military ==
=== Air ===
==== Units ====
- 443 Maritime Helicopter Squadron, a Royal Canadian Air Force unit, nicknamed "Hornet"
- 113 Squadron (Israel), an Israeli Air Force unit also known as the Tayeset Ha'Tsira'a ("Hornet Squadron")

==== Aircraft and engines ====
- McDonnell Douglas F/A-18 Hornet, a jet combat aircraft
  - McDonnell Douglas CF-18 Hornet, a Canadian variant
- De Havilland Hornet, a World War II-era combat aircraft
- Hornet, original name of the Hawker Fury British biplane fighter
- Hornet, unofficial name of the Curtiss 18 Model 18B triplane fighter
- AGM-64 Hornet, an experimental American missile
- ABC Hornet, a World War I aircraft engine
- Messerschmitt Me 410 Hornisse ("Hornet"), a World War II German aircraft
- Aérospatiale SA 321 Super Frelon ("Super Hornet") helicopter, also known in the Israeli Air Force as Tzir'a ("Hornet")
  - SNCASE SE.3200 Frelon ("Hornet") helicopter (precursor of the Aérospatiale SA 321 Super Frelon)
- Granta Hornet, an unmanned aerial vehicle (UAV)
- Teledyne FLIR Black Hornet Nano, an unmanned aerial vehicle (UAV)
- Hornet, a low-cost strike drone used by Ukraine

=== Land ===
- Medium Mark C Hornet, a British First World War tank
- Humber Hornet, a British armoured car
- Hornisse, a German tank destroyer (later renamed to Nashorn)
- M93 Hornet mine, an American anti-tank mine

=== Sea ===
- HMS Hornet, ten ships of the Royal Navy
- USS Hornet, eight ships of the U.S. Navy

== Places ==
- Hornet Township, Beltrami County, Minnesota
- Hornet, Missouri, an unincorporated community
- Hornet Peak, Queen Maud Land, Antarctica

== Sports ==
=== University and high school teams ===
- Alabama State University Hornets
- California State University, Sacramento Hornets
- The teams of Concordia College Alabama
- Delaware State University Hornets
- Emporia State Hornets and Lady Hornets, Kansas
- Kalamazoo College Hornets, Michigan
- Surrattsville High School Hornets, Maryland
- Dixie High School Hornets, South Carolina
- Midwood High School Hornets, New York
- Hamilton High School West Hornets, New Jersey
- Herndon High School Hornets, Virginia

=== Ice hockey teams ===
- Bracknell Hornets, a team in the English National Hockey League
- Cambridge Hornets, a Canadian Senior "AAA" team from Cambridge, Ontario
- Herlev Hornets, a Danish AL-Bank Ligaen team
- Huntington Hornets, an American International Hockey League team in the 1956–57 season
- Langley Hornets, a former name of the Canadian Junior "A" team West Kelowna Warriors
- Pittsburgh Hornets, a former American minor league team (1936–56, 1961–67)
- Thunder Bay Hornets, a former Canadian Junior "A" team (1982-86)

=== Other teams ===
- Charlotte Hornets (disambiguation), several sports teams
- Cleveland Hornets, former baseball team
- Dandy Town Hornets F.C., Bermuda soccer team
- Howick Hornets, New Zealand, rugby league team
- Hull Hornets, British American-football team
- Montreal Hornets, former Canadian rugby union team
- New Orleans Hornets, former National Basketball Association team
- Rochdale Hornets, professional rugby league team
- Rochdale Hornets (speedway), former speedway team
- Watford F.C., known as "the Hornets" after their yellow and black kit

=== American football stadiums ===
- Hornet Stadium (Montgomery), on the campus of Alabama State University
- Hornet Stadium (Sacramento), on the campus of California State University, Sacramento

=== Other uses in sports ===
- The Hornet, a professional wrestler from the United States Wrestling Association
- Hornet, the puck used in the Swiss sport Hornussen

== Transportation ==
=== Air ===
- Firebird Hornet, a German paraglider design
- Glasflügel 206 Hornet, 1970s glider
- US Light Aircraft Hornet, an ultralight aircraft
- Hiller YH-32 Hornet, an American ultralight helicopter
- Harkness Hornet, 1920s Australian aircraft engine
- Pratt & Whitney R-1690 Hornet, aero engine produced 1926–1942
- Vintage Ultralight SR-1 Hornet, an American 1980s ultralight aircraft design

=== Land ===
- AMC Hornet, a compact car manufactured from 1970 to 1977
- Dodge Hornet (concept car), revealed in 2006
- Dodge Hornet, an SUV revealed in 2022
- Hudson Hornet, a car manufactured from 1951 to 1957
- Wolseley Hornet six, a 1930s saloon, coupé, sports and racing car
- Wolseley Hornet (Mini), a variant of the original Mini car
- Honda CB250F, a motorcycle known as the Hornet, first 'Hornet' released by Honda
- Honda CB600F, a motorcycle known as the Hornet in Europe and Brazil
- Honda CB900F, a motorcycle known as the Hornet 900 in Europe
- BSA Hornet, a British motorcycle for export to the US from 1964 to 1965

=== Sea ===
- Hornet (clipper), 1851, which raced Flying Cloud around Cape Horn
- Hornet (dinghy), a type of sailing dinghy
- Hornet, a steamer involved in the Hornet incident (an 1871 diplomatic incident)

== Other uses ==
- Hornet (roller coaster), an amusement ride in Amarillo
- Hornet (Hewlett-Packard), a codename for an 80186-compatible embedded processor for the HP 100LX, 200LX and 1000CX palmtop PCs
- Hornet (app), a gay dating app
- .17 Hornet, a type of rifle cartridge
- .22 Hornet, a type of rifle cartridge
