= CHS =

CHS may refer to:

== Businesses and organizations ==
=== Healthcare bodies ===
- Canadian Hemophilia Society, a non-profit
- Center for Healthy Sex, a therapy center in Los Angeles, U.S.
- Community Health Systems, an American hospital network
- Central Health Service, a Central Civil Service (Health Service) under the Government of India.

=== Other businesses and organizations ===
- CHS Inc., an American agricultural co-operative
- Canadian Hydrographic Service, a government body
- Connecticut Historical Society, an American non-profit

== Places by code ==
- Charleston International Airport, South Carolina, U.S. (by IATA airport code)
- Cheshire, a county of England (by Chapman code in genealogy)

== Schools and education ==
=== United States ===
- Camas High School, Washington
- Canton High School (Massachusetts)
- Calumet High School (Calumet, Michigan)
- Castor High School, Castor, Louisiana
- Cedar City High School, Utah
- Centennial High School (Howard County, Maryland)
- Center for Hellenic Studies, a research institute in Washington, D.C.
- Chalmette High School, Louisiana
- Chaparral High School - Multiple
- Chattahoochee High School, Georgia
- Chattahoochee High School (Florida)
- Chelsea High School (Michigan)
- Cheshire High School, Connecticut
- Cienega High School, Arizona
- Clayton High School, Missouri
- Clements High School, Sugar Land, Texas
- Cleveland High School (Portland, Oregon)
- Clifton High School (New Jersey)
- Charlotte High School (disambiguation), the name of schools in Florida, Michigan, New York, North Carolina, and Texas
- Columbine High School, Colorado
- Conard High School, Connecticut
- Collinsville High School, Illinois
- Conestoga High School, Pennsylvania
- Crater High School, Oregon
- Winston Churchill High School (Potomac, Maryland)
- Custer High School (Custer, South Dakota)

=== Elsewhere ===
- Catholic High School, Melaka, Malaysia
- Catholic High School, Petaling Jaya, Malaysia
- Catholic High School, Singapore
- Cheadle Hulme School, Greater Manchester, England
- Clarence High School (India), east Bangalore, Kamataka
- Clifton High School (Bristol) Bristol, England
- Colegio Hebreo Sefaradí, a Jewish private school in Cuajimalpa, Mexico City
- College Historical Society, at Trinity College, Dublin, Ireland
- Congleton High School, Cheshire, England
- Cookstown High School, Cookstown, Northern Ireland
- Cootamundra High School, Riverina, Australia
- Cronulla High School, Sydney, Australia

== Science and technology ==
- Cannabinoid hyperemesis syndrome, a medical condition
- Chalcone synthase, a plant enzyme
- Circular hollow section, British term for a hollow structural section
- Contact Handling System, software used by the Metropolitan Police, London, U.K.
- Cylinder-head-sector, a method for addressing data on magnetic disks
- Cerebral hyperperfusion syndrome

== Other uses ==
- Confidential human source, an informant
- Core Humanitarian Standard on Quality and Accountability, a code for humanitarian and development actors
- Charles-Haden Savage, fictional character portrayed by Steve Martin in Only Murders in the Building
