= List of ships named Charlotte =

A number of ships have been named Charlotte.

== Merchant ships ==
- Charlotte (1784) - an English full-rigged ship built in the River Thames and chartered in 1786 to carry convicts as part of the First Fleet to New South Wales. She returned to commercial trading, and disappears from lists by 1821 (possibly lost off Newfoundland in 1818)
- Charlotte (1803) - a full-rigged ship built at the Bombay Dockyard. She spent most of her career as a country ship, trading between India and China. She was wrecked in 1851.
- Charlotte (1803) - a sloop that sank off the New South Wales coast in 1808
- Charlotte (1844) - a full-rigged ship of 450 tons (bm), built in Liverpool. On 20 September 1854 she was wrecked at Algoa Bay, Cape Colony with heavy loss of life while carrying troops from the 27 Regiment of Foot from Cork to Calcutta, together with some dependents.
- Charlotte (1864) - a 1,767 GRT paddle cargo steamer, built by Archibald Denny at Dumbarton, Scotland as a blockade runner during the American civil war. She successfully ran the blockade in and out of Wilmington, North Carolina in December 1864, but was captured the following month. Sold by the prize court and renamed Agnes Mary, she returned to Britain and to her former owners as Charlotte. She was reported lost in 1870.
- Charlotte (1889) - a 1,767 GRT American coastal excursion steamer, built by Neafie & Levy at Philadelphia for the Baltimore, Chesapeake & Richmond Steam Boat Co. She was later with the Cape Cod Steamship Co. as Dorothy Bradford until broken up in 1937.
- Charlotte (sternwheeler) (1896) - a Canadian paddle steamer on the Fraser River, British Columbia. She was wrecked and abandoned in 1910.
- Charlotte (1922) - a 46 metre towing barge built at Hardinxveld. Netherlands and later a motor ship. As Tordino, she was converted to museum ship in 2017 at Oudenburg, Belgium.

== Naval ships ==
- HMS Charlotte – several vessels of the British Royal Navy
- SMS Charlotte (1885) - an 18-gun screw corvette, the last German sailing warship built, used for naval training. She was hulked in 1921.
- USS Charlotte – several vessels of the United States Navy.

== See also ==
- Princess Charlotte – several vessels
- Queen Charlotte – several vessels
