= Princess Charlotte of Wales =

Princess Charlotte of Wales may refer to:

- Princess Charlotte of Wales (1796–1817), only child of George, Prince Regent (later George IV)
  - Princess Charlotte of Wales (ship), launched in 1812 and broken up in 1831
- Princess Charlotte of Wales (born 2015), eldest granddaughter of Charles III and only daughter of William, Prince of Wales

== See also ==
- Charlotte Wales-Almy (1869/1872 or 1873 – 1946), American travel writer
- Charlotte of the United Kingdom (disambiguation)
- Princess Charlotte (disambiguation)
