= Charlott =

Charlott is the name of:

- Charlott Cordes (born 1988), German fashion model from Hamburg, Germany
- Charlott Da Silva (born 1986), Model of Venezuela
- Vivian Charlott Burkhardt (born 1986), Miss Grenada 2007
- Charlott Daudert (1913–1961), German film actress
- Charlott Strandberg (born 1962), Swedish revue-singer and actress

== See also ==
- Charlotta
- Charlotte (disambiguation)
