= Princess Charlotte (ship) =

Several vessels have been named Princess Charlotte for one of the many Princesses Charlotte:

- Princess Charlotte (1796 EIC ship) was an "extra ship’’ of the British East India Company (EIC). She made four voyages for the EIC. On her second voyage she suffered a short-lived mutiny and then spent almost a year as an armed ship in the service of the EIC, including a voyage to the Red Sea. A squadron of the French Navy captured her in the Vizagapatam roads in 1804, on her fourth voyage.
- Princess Charlotte (1797 ship), of 190 tons (bm), was launched at Chatham as a packet sailing for the Post Office Packet Service. She was lost in the Bahamas in April 1819; passengers and mails were saved.
- Princess Charlotte was launched at Cowes in 1805. The Royal Navy purchased her in 1807 and named her HMS Viper. The 4-gun schooner disappeared in February 1809 while sailing from Cadiz to Gibraltar and was presumed to have foundered with all hands.
- Princess Charlotte (1813 ship) was launched in New York in 1811 under another name, taken in prize in 1813 and renamed, and wrecked in 1824.
- Princess Charlotte (1813 Sunderland ship) was launched in Sunderland. She immediately started trading with the Indian Ocean and India under a license from the British East India Company (EIC). She made one voyage for the EIC, and two voyages transporting convicts to Australia, one to Hobart Town, Van Diemen's Land, and one to Port Jackson, New South Wales. She foundered in 1828 in the Bay of Bengal.
- Princess Charlotte (1814 ship) was launched at South Shields. She initially sailed as West Indiaman. Then between 1818 and 1819 she made a voyage to India and one to Ceylon, both under a license from the British East India Company (EIC). On her return in 1819 she became a Dundee-based whaler in the northern whale fishery. She continued whale hunting until ice crushed her on 14 June 1856.
- Princess Charlotte (1814 Bristol ship) spent almost all of her career as a West Indiaman though she did make voyages to North America and Africa. She was sold in 1848 for breaking up.
- Princess Charlotte (1815 ship) was launched at Whitehaven. She made several voyages to India, sailing under a license issued by the EIC. She was last listed in 1841, though she apparently sailed for at least another two years.
- Princess Charlotte (1819 brig) was a 60-ton brig that disappeared in 1820 on a voyage between Hobart Town and Sydney.

== See also ==
- Princess Charlotte of Wales (1812 EIC ship) was an East Indiaman named for Princess Charlotte of Wales. She made nine voyages to Madras and Bengal for the EIC before she was broken up in 1831.
- HMS Princess Charlotte, the name of several ships of the Royal Navy
- Hired armed schooner Princess Charlotte, the name of several ships under contract to the Royal Navy during the Napoleonic Wars
