= Charlotta =

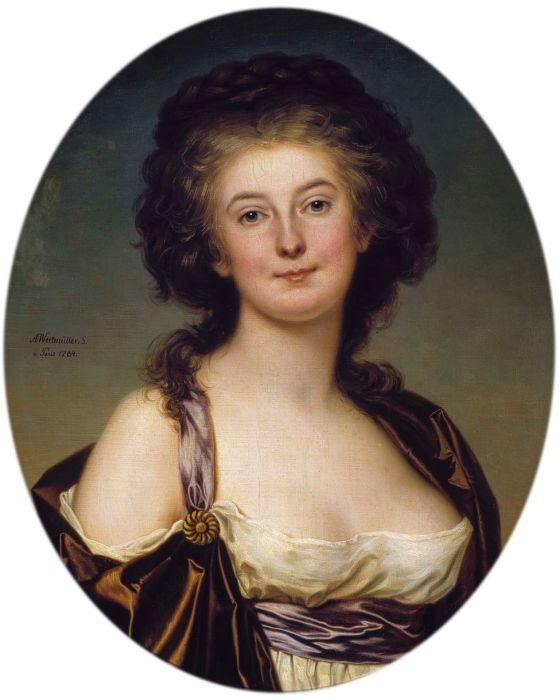
Mademoiselle Charlotte Eckerman (1759-1790), Swedish singer and actress

Charlotta is a Danish, Finnish and Swedish feminine given name that is an alternate form of Charlotte and a feminine form of the masculine version of Charlot and Carl. Notable people referred to by this name include the following:

== Given name ==
- Charlotta Almlöf (1813–1882), Swedish stage actress
- Charlotta Arfwedson (1776–1862), Swedish countess and artist
- Charlotta Aurora De Geer (1779–1834), Swedish countess, salonist and courtier
- Charlotta Bass (1874–1969), American educator, newspaper publisher-editor, and civil rights activist
- Charlotta Berger (1784–1852), Swedish writer, translator, poet and songwriter
- Charlotta Burešová (1904–1983), Czech Jewish painter and Holocaust survivor
- Charlotta Cedercreutz (1736–1815), Swedish artist, lady-in-waiting and baroness
- Charlotta Cederström (1760–1832), Swedish dilettante artist, salon hostess, and baroness
- Charlotta Deland (1807–1864), Swedish stage actress
- Charlotta Djurström (1807–1877), Swedish stage actress
- Charlotta Eriksson (1794–1862), Swedish stage actress
- Charlotta Frölich (1698–1770), Swedish writer, historian, agronomist and poet
- Charlotta Fougberg (born 1985), Swedish athlete who specializes in steeplechase
- Charlotta Jonsson (born 1973), Swedish actress
- Charlotta Löfgren (1720–1784), Swedish poet
- Charlotta Lönnqvist (1815–1891), Finnish cultural personality
- Charlotta Malm-Reuterholm (1768–1845), Finnish artist, painter, writer and noble
- Charlotta Öberg (1818–1856), Swedish poet
- Charlotta Pisinger (born 1960), Danish medical doctor and professor in tobacco prevention
- Charlotta Raa-Winterhjelm (1838–1907), Swedish actor
- Charlotta Richardy (1751–1831), Swedish industrialist
- Charlotta Roos (1771–1809), Swedish medium
- Charlotta Schlyter, Swedish diplomat and ambassador
- Charlotta Seuerling (1782/84 – 1828), blind Swedish concert singer, harpsichordist, composer and poet
- Charlotta Skjöldebrand (1791–1866), Swedish court official
- Charlotta Sörenstam (born 1973), Swedish professional golfer
- Charlotta Sparre (1719–1795), Swedish noble and courtier
- Charlotta Elisabeth van der Lith (1700–1753), Dutch plantation owner
- Charlotta von Liewen (1683–1735), Swedish countess
- Charlotta Wersäll (1858–1924), Swedish noblewoman

== Middle name ==
- Anna Charlotta Schröderheim (1754–1791), Swedish noble and salonist
- Catharina Charlotta Swedenmarck (1744–1813), Swedish-Finnish writer and poet
- Eleonora Charlotta d'Albedyhll (1770–1835), Swedish countess, poet and salon holder
- Elisabet Charlotta Piper (1787–1860), Swedish court official
- Elisabeth Charlotta Karsten (1789–1856), Swedish painter
- Hanna Charlotta Bäcklund, murder victim
- Hedvig Amalia Charlotta Klinckowström (1777–1810), Swedish countess, courtier and artist
- Hedvig Charlotta Nordenflycht (1718–1763), Swedish poet, feminist and salon hostess
- Helena Charlotta Åkerhielm (1786–1828), Swedish dramatist and translator
- Lovisa Charlotta Borgman (1798–1884), Swedish violinist

== See also ==
- Carlotta (name)
- Charlott
- Charlotte (given name)
