= List of shipwrecks in April 1824 =

The list of shipwrecks in April 1824 includes ships sunk, foundered, grounded, or otherwise lost during April 1824.

== 1 April ==
List of shipwrecks: 1 April 1824
Ship	State	Description
Industry	United Kingdom	The sloop was driven ashore at Beadnell, Northumberland. Her crew survived. She was subsequently set afire and destroyed when her cargo of quicklime reacted with seawater.
Lord Nelson	United Kingdom	The ship was driven ashore and wrecked near Derby Haven, Isle of Man. Her crew were rescued. She was on a voyage from Liverpool, Lancashire to Londonderry.
Princess Royal	United Kingdom	The ship was lost off Bardsey Island, Caernarfonshire. She was on a voyage from Bristol, Gloucestershire to Liverpool.
Two Sisters	United Kingdom	The ship foundered in the Atlantic Ocean off the coast of the United States with the loss of all but one of those on board.

== 2 April ==
List of shipwrecks: 2 April 1824
Ship	State	Description
Enterprize	United Kingdom	The ship was driven ashore at Sea Palling, Norfolk. Her crew were rescued. She was on a voyage from London to Newcastle upon Tyne, Northumberland. Enterprize was refloated on 3 May and taken in to Great Yarmouth, Norfolk.
Fair Cambrian	United Kingdom	The ship was wrecked on Chicken Head, Isle of Lewis with the loss of all hands.
Harmony	United Kingdom	The ship foundered off Ostend, West Flanders, Netherlands. She was on a voyage from Liverpool, Lancashire to Ostend.
Harriet	United Kingdom	The ship was driven ashore and wrecked at Mablethorpe, Lincolnshire. She was on a voyage from Hull, Yorkshire to King's Lynn, Norfolk.
James and Mary	United Kingdom	The ship was driven ashore at Sunderland, County Durham. Her crew were rescued.
Latona	United Kingdom	The ship was driven ashore and wrecked 4 nautical miles (7.4 km) west of Wells-next-the-Sea, Norfolk. She was on a voyage from London to Glasgow, Renfrewshire.
Patriot	United Kingdom	The ship was driven ashore at Sunderland. Her crew were rescued.
Providence Goodwill	United Kingdom	The ship capsized in the North Sea off Winterton-on-Sea, Norfolk with the loss of all hands. She was on a voyage from Great Yarmouth, Norfolk to Hull.
Princess Charlotte	United Kingdom	The ship had been wrecked on the Main Reef, near Tobacco Key (Tobacco Caye, Belize), as she was coming from London. She had bilged and was full of water, but it was hoped that if the weather remained moderate some of her cargo might be saved.
Roseberry	United Kingdom	The ship capsized off Hartlepool, County Durham. Her crew were rescued.
Walpole	United Kingdom	The ship was driven ashore at Sunderland. Her crew were rescued.

== 3 April ==
List of shipwrecks: 3 April 1824
Ship	State	Description
Algeria	Portugal	The ship was wrecked on Allin's Bank, off the coast of Brazil. Her crew were rescued. She was on a voyage from Maranhão, Brazil to Porto.
George Angus	United Kingdom	The schooner was captured by Spring Bird ( Pirates) off Belize. She was subsequently plundered and destroyed.

== 5 April ==
List of shipwrecks: 5 April 1824
Ship	State	Description
Robsons	United Kingdom	The ship departed from The Downs for Quebec City, Lower Canada, British North America. No further trace, presumed foundered with the loss of all hands.
Two Brothers	United Kingdom	The ship foundered in the Strait of Gibraltar. Her crew were rescued by Brilliant (United Kingdom).

== 6 April ==
List of shipwrecks: 6 April 1824
Ship	State	Description
Haʻaheo o Hawaiʻi	Kingdom of Hawaii	The hermaphrodite brig was wrecked on a reef in Hanalei Bay.
Thisbe	United Kingdom	The ship departed from, Liverpool, Lancashire for Quebec City, Lower Canada, British North America. No further trace, presumed foundered with the loss of all hands.

== 7 April ==
List of shipwrecks: 7 April 1824
Ship	State	Description
Langton	United Kingdom	The ship struck a rock and foundered in the Irish Sea south of the Tuskar Rock. Her crew were rescued. She was on a voyage from Liverpool, Lancashire for Cape Breton Island, Nova Scotia, British North America.
Laurel	United Kingdom	The ship was in collision with Cornwall in the English Channel off Hastings, Sussex. She capsized but was righted and consequently beached at Bexhill-on-Sea, Sussex. Her crew survived. Laurel was on a voyage from the Charente to London.
Louisa	Stettin	The ship was wrecked on Haisborough Sands, in the North Sea off the coast of Norfolk. Her crew survived. She was on a voyage from Stettin to London.

== 10 April ==
List of shipwrecks: 10 April 1824
Ship	State	Description
Bellona	United Kingdom	The ship was driven ashore near Fishguard, Pembrokeshire. She was on a voyage from Liverpool, Lancashire to Bristol, Gloucestershire.
Liberty	United Kingdom	The ship departed from Poole, Dorset for Burin, Newfoundland, British North America. She was discovered dismasted and abandoned in the Atlantic Ocean on 7 May by Bon Aventure (France).

== 11 April ==
List of shipwrecks: 11 April 1824
Ship	State	Description
Arab	United Kingdom	The whaler was abandoned in the Antarctic Ocean (approximately 57°S 7°E). Her 36 crew were rescued by Ocean (United Kingdom). She was on a voyage from Fenning's Island to London.
Gute Hoffnung	flag unknown	The ship was driven ashore and wrecked at Gravelines, Nord, France. She was on a voyage from Hull, Yorkshire, United Kingdom to Bilbao, Spain.

== 12 April ==
List of shipwrecks: 12 April 1824
Ship	State	Description
Georges	France	The ship foundered off La Bouille, Seine-Inférieure. She was on a voyage from London, United Kingdom to Rouen, Seine-Inférieure.
Nelly & Kitty	United Kingdom	The ship was abandoned in the Atlantic Ocean. Her crew were rescued by Dasher (United Kingdom). Nelly & Kitty was on a voyage from Seville, Spain to Liverpool, Lancashire.

== 15 April ==
List of shipwrecks: 15 April 1824
Ship	State	Description
Providence	United Kingdom	The schooner was driven ashore in Bream Bay. Her crew were rescued. She was on a voyage from Brixham, Devon to Cardiff, Glamorgan.

== 16 April ==
List of shipwrecks: 16 April 1824
Ship	State	Description
Camillus	United Kingdom	The ship foundered in the Atlantic Ocean with the loss of three of her crew. Survivors were rescued by Columbus and Ross (both United Kingdom). She was on a voyage from Liverpool, Lancashire to Quebec City, Lower Canada, British North America.
Cecelia	France	The ship was wrecked at La Rochelle, Charente-Maritime with the loss of seven of her crew. she was on a voyage from Havana, Cuba to Bordeaux, Gironde.
Christina	United Kingdom	The ship was lost near Wells-next-the-Sea, Norfolk. She was on a voyage from South Shields, County Durham to London.
Hannah	United Kingdom	The Humber Keel was wrecked on the Buxey Sand, in the North Sea with the loss of all hands. She was on a voyage from Hull, Yorkshire to London.
Providence	United Kingdom	The schooner was driven ashore and wrecked between Helford and Falmouth, Cornwall. Her crew were rescued. She was on a voyage from Brixham, Devon to Newport, Monmouthshire.

== 17 April ==
List of shipwrecks: 17 April 1824
Ship	State	Description
Carolina	United Kingdom	The ship departed from Plymouth, Devon for Lisbon, Portugal. No further trace, presumed foundered with the loss of all hands.
Helen	United Kingdom	The brigantine sprang a leak and was abandoned in the Atlantic Ocean off Rockall, Inverness-shire with the loss of sixteen lives. Survivors were rescued by Flora (Prussia). Helen was on a voyage from Dundee Forfarshire to Montreal, Lower Canada, British North America.
Vriede	Netherlands	The ship was driven ashore on Terschelling, Friesland.

== 18 April ==
List of shipwrecks: 18 April 1824
Ship	State	Description
Helen	United Kingdom	The ship struck a submerged rock 7 nautical miles (13 km) off Rockall, Inverness-shire and foundered with the loss of sixteen lives. Survivors were rescued the next day by a Prussian vessel. Helen was on a voyage from Dundee, Forfarshire to Quebec City, Lower Canada, British North America.

== 19 April ==
List of shipwrecks: 19 April 1824
Ship	State	Description
Cossack	United Kingdom	The ship struck the Orthez Bank, off Buenos Aires, Argentina and foundered with the loss of a crew member.
Thomas	United States	The ship was wrecked on the South East Bank. Her crew were rescued. She was on a voyage from Boston, Massachusetts to Mobile, Alabama.

== 20 April ==
List of shipwrecks: 20 April 1824
Ship	State	Description
Jean and Mary	United Kingdom	The sloop was wrecked at Newburgh, Fife. Her crew survived. She was on a voyage from Sunderland, County Durham to Newburgh.

== 22 April ==
List of shipwrecks: 22 April 1824
Ship	State	Description
Elizabeth	United Kingdom	The ship was driven ashore on Læsø, Debmark and was wrecked. She was on a voyage from Danzig to London.
Maria	United Kingdom	The ship, a sloop or smack, was in collision with the paddle steamer Swift (United Kingdom) in the Irish Sea off Carrickfergus, County Antrim and foundered with the loss of both crew.

== 23 April ==
List of shipwrecks: 23 April 1824
Ship	State	Description
Deux Ceciles	France	The ship was driven ashore and wrecked at Boulogne, Pas-de-Calais. She was on a voyage from Sète, Hérault to Dunkirk, Nord.
Diligence	United Kingdom	The ship was driven ashore at Aberdovey, Merionethshire. She was on a voyage from London to Aberdovey. Diligence was refloated on 26 April.
Friend's Regard	United Kingdom	The ship was wrecked on the Middle Sand, in the North Sea off Whitstable, Kent.
Olive	United Kingdom	The ship was driven ashore and wrecked at Gunwalloe, Cornwall. All on board were rescued. She was on a voyage from Tenby, Pembrokeshire to Littlehampton, Sussex.
Sally	United Kingdom	The brig foundered in Swansea Bay. Her crew survived.
Scotia	United Kingdom	The ship was driven ashore in the Isles of Scilly. She was on a voyage from the Cape of Good Hope to London. She was refloated later that day and taken in to St. Mary's, Isles of Scilly.

== 24 April ==
List of shipwrecks: 24 April 1824
Ship	State	Description
Amity	United States	The 382-ton sailing ship was wrecked in fog off Manasquan, New Jersey, without loss of life. Her wreck, which sank in 30 feet (9 m) of water 330 yards (302 m) offshore, was discovered in 1955 and is nicknamed the "Manasquan Wreck."
Comet	United Kingdom	The ship was driven ashore at Horsey, Norfolk. All on board were rescued. She was on a voyage from London to Leith, Lothian. Comet was refloated on 3 May and taken in to Great Yarmouth, Norfolk.
Roberts	United Kingdom	The ship was wrecked on the Karam Rocks, Isle of Man. Her crew were rescued. She was on a voyage from Dublin to Harrington, Cumberland.
William and Henry	United Kingdom	The ship was wrecked on the Corton Sand, in the North Sea off Lowestoft, Suffolk. William and Henry was refloated the next day and beached at Lowestoft.

== 25 April ==
List of shipwrecks: 25 April 1824
Ship	State	Description
Friends of the Guard	United Kingdom	The ship was wrecked on the Middle Sand, in the North Sea off Whitstable, Kent.
Industry	United Kingdom	The ship sprang a leak and was beached at North Shields, County Durham.
Integrity	United States	The full-rigged ship was driven ashore at Point del Indio, Argentina and was abandoned by her crew. She was on a voyage from Baltimore, Maryland to Buenos Aires, Argentina.
Polly	United Kingdom	The ship was wrecked on the American coast. She was on a voyage from London to Saint John, New Brunswick, British North America.
Stranger	United Kingdom	The brig was driven ashore and wrecked north of Stonehaven, Aberdeenshire. Her crew were rescued. She was on a voyage from Aberdeen to Sunderland, County Durham.

== 27 April ==
List of shipwrecks: 27 April 1824
Ship	State	Description
Happy Return	United Kingdom	The schooner collided with the brig Edward (United Kingdom) off Flamborough Head, Yorkshire and sank with the loss of all but one of her crew.
Pallas	(Sweden) Norway	The ship was driven ashore on Eierland, North Holland, United Kingdom of the Netherlands. She was on a voyage from Dram to Amsterdam, North Holland.

== 28 April ==
List of shipwrecks: 28 April 1824
Ship	State	Description
Lilla Gustav	Hamburg	The ship was driven ashore at Cuxhaven. She was on a voyage from Cette, Hérault, France to Cuxhaven. Lilla Gustav was refloated on 2 May and taken in to Cuxhaven.
Mary	United Kingdom	The smack collided with the steamship Swift (United Kingdom off Carrickfergus, County Antrim and foundered with the loss of all hands.

== 29 April ==
List of shipwrecks: 29 April 1824
Ship	State	Description
Rosina	United Kingdom	The ship was driven ashore at Whitehead, County Antrim. She was on a voyage from New York, United States to Liverpool, Lancashire. Rosina was refloated on 3 May and taken in to Belfast, County Antrim.

== 30 April ==
List of shipwrecks: 30 April 1824
Ship	State	Description
Dorset	United Kingdom	The ship was severely damaged by fire at Liverpool, Lancashire.
Francis	United Kingdom	The ship was wrecked at La Orotava, Tenerife, Spain. Her crew were rescued.
Margery	United Kingdom	The ship foundered in the Atlantic Ocean. Her crew were rescued bu James Dunlop (United Kingdom). Margery was on a voyage from London to Montreal, Lower Canada, British North America.
Providence	United Kingdom	The ship was abandoned in the Atlantic Ocean. Her crew were rescued by Harriet (United Kingdom). Providence was on a voyage from Figueira da Foz, Portugal to Newfoundland, British North America.

== Unknown date ==
List of shipwrecks: Unknown date in April 1824
Ship	State	Description
Agenoria	United Kingdom	The ship was lost on the English Bank, in the South Atlantic off the coast of Brazil with the loss of at least six crew. There were at least five survivors.
Amity	United Kingdom	The ship was driven ashore at Manasquan, New Jersey, United States. She was later refloated.
Elizabeth	United Kingdom	The ship ran aground on the Berber Bank, off the Welsh coast and was abandoned by her crew. She was on a voyage from Dublin to Preston, Lancashire. Elizabeth was later refloated and taken in to Lytham St. Annes, Lancashire.
Harriet	United Kingdom	The ship departed from Terceira, Azores, Portugal. No further trace, presumed foundered with the loss of all hands.
Liberality	United Kingdom	The ship foundered in the Atlantic Ocean.
Lively Kate	United Kingdom	The ship foundered in the Irish Sea off the Saltee Islands, County Wexford in mid-April. Her crew were rescued. She was on a voyage from Limerick to Belfast, County Antrim.
Mistic	Greece	The ship was surrendered to Abeille (French Navy). She was set afire and destroyed.
Saint Esprit	France	The ship was wrecked on the Mani Peninsula, Greece.
Surry	United Kingdom	The ship was wrecked near Cape St. Lu, Africa before 9 April. Her crew were rescued.
Tre Venner	United Kingdom	The ship was driven ashore at Mardyck, Nord, France. She was on a voyage from Grimsby, Lincolnshire to St. Ubes, Portugal.
