= Charlotte of Württemberg =

Charlotte of Württemberg may refer to:

- Charlotte, Princess Royal (1766–1828), queen consort of Württemberg
- Princess Charlotte of Württemberg (1807–1873), also known as Elena Pavlovna
- Charlotte of Schaumburg-Lippe (1864–1946), queen consort of Württemberg

== See also ==
- Princess Charlotte (disambiguation)
- Queen Charlotte (disambiguation)
