= M93 =

M93 or M-93 may refer to:

- Messier 93, an open star cluster in the constellation Puppis
- Beretta M93R, a selective-fire machine pistol made by the Beretta company
- Zastava M93 Black Arrow, a 12.7 mm Anti-materiel rifle
- M93 Fox, a Chemical, Biological, Radiological and Nuclear reconnaissance vehicle
- M-93 (Michigan highway), a state highway in Michigan
- M93 HORNET mine, an American anti tank mine
- Mannlicher M93, a Romanian service rifle
- Salvator-Dormus M93, early Austro-Hungarian heavy machine gun
- Swiss Mannlicher M93, a Swiss service rifle
