= Charlotte of the United Kingdom (disambiguation) =

Charlotte of the United Kingdom (1744–1818) was the queen consort of George III.

Charlotte of the United Kingdom or Charlotte of Great Britain may also refer to:

- Charlotte, Princess Royal (1766–1828), eldest daughter of George III
- Princess Charlotte of Wales (1796–1817), only child of George, Prince Regent (later George IV)
- Princess Charlotte of Clarence (1819), eldest legitimate daughter of Prince William, Duke of Clarence (later William IV)
- Princess Charlotte of Wales (born 2015), granddaughter of Charles III

== See also ==
- Princess Charlotte (disambiguation)
- Princess Charlotte of Wales (disambiguation)
- Queen Charlotte (disambiguation)
