= List of shipwrecks in September 1820 =

The list of shipwrecks in September 1820 includes ships sunk, wrecked or otherwise lost during September 1820.

== 1 September ==
List of shipwrecks: 1 September 1820
Ship	State	Description
Martha	United States	The schooner was wrecked on the Anegado Shoals.

== 2 September ==
List of shipwrecks: 2 September 1820
Ship	State	Description
Forsoget	Norway	The schooner was wrecked on the Goodwin Sands, Kent, United Kingdom. Her crew were rescued. She was on a voyage from Bergen to Messina, Sicily. The wreck refloated on 5 September and was taken in to Ramsgate, Kent.
Rysberge	Netherlands	The smack was driven ashore and wrecked at Ostend.

== 5 September ==
List of shipwrecks: 5 September 1820
Ship	State	Description
Ariana	United Kingdom	The ship ran aground at Narva, Russia. She was on a voyage from Saint Petersburg, Russia to Leith, Lothian.
Ellens	United Kingdom	The ship ran aground on the Gunfleet Sand, in the North Sea off Harwich, Essex. Ellens was refloated on 10 September and taken in to Harwich in a severely damaged condition.

== 6 September ==
List of shipwrecks: 6 September 1820
Ship	State	Description
Diligence	United Kingdom	The sloop was wrecked at Llanmadoc, Glamorgan. Her crew were rescued.
Tanjore	United Kingdom	The ship was struck by lightning in the Indian Ocean off Ceylon and was abandoned with the loss of two of her crew. She was on a voyage from London to Ceylon, Madras and Bengal, India.

== 7 September ==
List of shipwrecks: 7 September 1820
Ship	State	Description
Juno	United States	The ship was wrercked in the Abaco Islands. Her crew were rescued. She was on a voyage from Providence, Rhode Island to Havana, Cuba.

== 9 September ==
List of shipwrecks: 9 September 1820
Ship	State	Description
Industrie	France	The ship was run down and sunk in the Baltic Sea off Skagen, Denmark by Salus (United Kingdom) with the loss of a crew member. She was on a voyage from Saint Petersburg, Russia to Rouen, Seine-Inférieure.

== 10 September ==
List of shipwrecks: 10 September 1820
Ship	State	Description
Philip and William	United States	The ship capsized and sank in the Atlantic Ocean off Charleston, South Carolina with the loss of all but two of her crew She was on a voyage from Havana, Cuba to Bristol.

== 11 September ==
List of shipwrecks: 11 September 1820
Ship	State	Description
Kingston	United States	The ship foundered in the Atlantic Ocean. She was on a voyage from St. Ubes, Spain to Newburyport, Massachusetts.
Mary	United Kingdom	The ship was driven ashore near L'Islette, Lower Canada, British North America. She was on a voyage from Quebec City, Lower Canada to Coleraine, County Antrim.

== 12 September ==
List of shipwrecks: 12 September 1820
Ship	State	Description
Gesusters	United Kingdom	The ship was lost near Monte Christo, Gran Colombia. She was on a voyage from Kingston, Jamaica to Puerto de Plata, Santo Domingo via Monte Christo.
Juffrow Johanna Shrabeth	Norway	The ship was abandoned in the English Channel off the Isle of Wight, United Kingdom. She was later taken in to Poole, Dorset, United Kingdom. Juffrow Johanna Shrabeth was on a voyage from Christiansand to Vila Nova de Gaia, Portugal.

== 13 September ==
List of shipwrecks: 13 September 1820
Ship	State	Description
Brilliant	United Kingdom	The ship departed from Kronstadt, Russia for London. No further trace, presumed foundered with the loss of all hands.

== 15 September ==
List of shipwrecks: 15 September 1820
Ship	State	Description
Polly	United Kingdom	The ship was driven ashore east of Newhaven, Sussex. She was on a voyage from Bangor to Newhaven. Polly was later refloated and taken in to Newhaven

== 16 September ==
List of shipwrecks: 16 September 1820
Ship	State	Description
Charlotte	United Kingdom	The ship collided with Endymion (United Kingdom) off Lowestoft, Suffolk and foundered with the loss of two lives. Endymion was severely damaged and made for Harwich, Essex.
Trader	United Kingdom	The ship was driven ashore and wrecked in Loch Mingary.

== 17 September ==
List of shipwrecks: 17 September 1820
Ship	State	Description
Frederica Dorothea	France	The ship was wrecked near Ringkøbing, Denmark. She was on a voyage from Rouen, Seine-Inférieure to Saint Petersburg, Russia.
Helen	United Kingdom	The ship was wrecked in the English Channel 130 nautical miles (240 km) north east of Ouessant, Finistère, France with the loss of three of her twelve crew. The survivors were rescued by a French brig. She was on a voyage from Buccari, Austrian Empire to Portsmouth, Hampshire.
Thomas	United Kingdom	The ship ran aground on the Home Sand, in the North Sea off Lowestoft, Suffolk.

== 18 September ==
List of shipwrecks: 18 September 1820
Ship	State	Description
Mary	United Kingdom	The ship ran aground on the Beacon Ridge, in the North Sea off Lowestoft, Suffolk. She was on a voyage from Riga, Russia to London. Mary was refloated on 21 September and taken in to Lowestoft.

== 19 September ==
List of shipwrecks: 19 September 1820
Ship	State	Description
Frederica Christina	Sweden	The ship was wrecked on the coast of Jutland. She was on a voyage from Stockholm to Amsterdam, North Holland, Netherlands.
Friendship	United Kingdom	The ship was driven ashore and wrecked at Cape Broyle, Newfoundland, British North America. She was on a voyage from St. John's to "Buctush".
Jane	United Kingdom	The ship was lost on the Ooster Bank, in the North Sea. Her crew were rescued. She was on a voyage from Rotterdam, South Holland, Netherlands to Hull, Yorkshire.

== 20 September ==
List of shipwrecks: 20 September 1820
Ship	State	Description
Mary	United Kingdom	The sloop foundered in the River Tay with the loss of all three of her crew.
Orestes	United Kingdom	The collier was driven ashore and wrecked at Brighton, Sussex. Her crew were rescued.
Twee Gesusters	Netherlands	The ship was driven ashore at Sandhammaren, Sweden. She was on a voyage from Danzig to Amsterdam, North Holland.
Valentine	United Kingdom	The ship was lost near Portreath, Cornwall. Her crew were rescued. She was on a voyage from Swansea, Glamorgan to Portreath.

== 21 September ==
List of shipwrecks: 21 September 1820
Ship	State	Description
America	United States	The ship was driven ashore on the west coast of Bermuda.
British Queen	United Kingdom	The ship sprang a leak and foundered in Cardigan Bay. Her crew were rescued. She was on a voyage from Caernarfon to London.
Frau Maria	Prussia	The ship foundered 20 leagues (60 nautical miles (110 km)) north west of Britrum Island. Her crew were rescued. She was on a voyage from Königsburg to Amsterdam, North Holland, Netherlands.
Pallas	Russia	The ship was driven ashore on Listerlandet, Sweden. She was on a voyage from Madeira to Saint Petersburg. Pallas had been refloated by 20 November and was taken in to Fahrsund for repairs.
Victory	United Kingdom	The ship was lost near the Chagres River. She was on a voyage from Kingston, Jamaica to the Chagres.

== 22 September ==
List of shipwrecks: 22 September 1820
Ship	State	Description
Oscar	United Kingdom	The ship was driven ashore and hogged in the River Mersey. She was on a voyage from Gamla Carleby Sweden to Liverpool, Lancashire. Oscar was refloated the next day and taken in to Liverpool.
Paramaraibo	Netherlands	The ship was driven ashore at Kijkduin, South Holland.
Vine	United Kingdom	The sloop foundered in the North Sea off Clyth, Caithness. Her crew survived. She was on a voyage from Clyth to London.

== 23 September ==
List of shipwrecks: 23 September 1820
Ship	State	Description
Bittern	United Kingdom	The shipsprang a leak and was abandoned off the coast of Norway. Her crew were rescued by Betsey (United Kingdom).
George	United Kingdom	The ship was driven ashore and wrecked on "Rothscar", Sweden. Her crew survived. She was on a voyage from Saint Petersburg, Russia to Boston, Lincolnshire.
Hope	United Kingdom	The ship was abandoned in the Atlantic Ocean. Her crew were rescued by Lavinia and Nancy (both United Kingdom). Hope was on a voyage from Oporto, Portugal to Weymouth, Dorset.
James	United Kingdom	The ship was abandoned in the Atlantic Ocean (41°00′N 13°30′W). Her crew were rescued by Flying Fish(United Kingdom). She was on a voyage from Oporto to Bristol, Gloucestershire.
William	United Kingdom	The ship was driven ashore on Skagen, Denmark and was abandoned by her crew. She had been refloated by 28 September and taken in to Aalborg. William was on a voyage from Liverpool, Lancashire to Riga, Russia.

== 24 September ==
List of shipwrecks: 24 September 1820
Ship	State	Description
Christian	Hamburg	The ship was lost near "Cruds Island". She was on a voyage from Arkhangelsk, Russia to Hamburg.
L. R. Paris	France	The ship was driven ashore at Portland, Dorset, United Kingdom. She was on a voyage from Morlaix, Finistère to Havre de Grâce, Seine-Inférieure.
William & Isabella	United Kingdom	The ship was wrecked near Bergen, Norway. She was on a voyage from North Shields, County Durham to "Molda".

== 25 September ==
List of shipwrecks: 25 September 1820
Ship	State	Description
Aurora	United Kingdom	The ship was driven ashore at Gravesend, Kent. She was on a voyage from London to Bilbao, Spain.
Union	United Kingdom	The sloop capsized and sank in the English Channel off the coast of Hampshire with the loss of her captain.

== 26 September ==
List of shipwrecks: 26 September 1820
Ship	State	Description
Æschylus	United Kingdom	The ship was driven ashore at The Mumbles, Glamorgan. She was on a voyage from Cardiff to Oporto, Portugal. Æschylus was later refloated and taken in to Swansea.
Bee	United Kingdom	The ship ran aground on the Naas Sands, in the Bristol Channel, and foundered with the loss of three of her crew. She was on a voyage from Chepstow, Monmouthshire to Dublin.
Jugaren	Sweden	The ship was lost near Ameland, Friesland, Netherlands. She was on a voyage from Kristianstad to Amsterdam, North Holland, Netherlands.
Mary	(United Kingdom of Great Britain and Ireland) Dominica	The droging sloop foundered in the Caribbean Sea off Dominica.
Patriot	United Kingdom	The ship was wrecked on Anticosti Island, Quebec, British North America with the loss of three of her crew. She was on a voyage from Bermuda to Quebec.
Vine	United Kingdom	The ship foundered off Clyth, Caithness. Her crew survived. She was on a voyage from Clyth to London.

== 27 September ==
List of shipwrecks: 27 September 1820
Ship	State	Description
Eliza	Netherlands	The ship was lost off Vlieland, Friesland. She was on a voyage from Saint Petersburg, Russia to Amsterdam, North Holland.
General Macomb	United States	The brig foundered off Port-au-Prince, Haiti.
General Pike	United States	The brig foundered off Port-au-Prince.
Prince of Orange	United Kingdom	The ship was driven ashore on the Bramble Bank, in the Solent.
Princess Charlotte	United Kingdom	The brig departed from Hobart Town, Tasmania for Sydney, New South Wales. No further trace, presumed foundered with the loss of all on board.
Vriendschap	Netherlands	The ship was driven ashore on Vlieland.

== 28 September ==
List of shipwrecks: 28 September 1820
Ship	State	Description
Express	United Kingdom	The schooner was wrecked at Martinique.
William	United Kingdom	The full-rigged ship was driven ashore at New London, Prince Edward Island, British North America. She was on a voyage from New London to Falmouth, Cornwall. The ship was abandoned on 9 October.

== 29 September ==
List of shipwrecks: 29 September 1820
Ship	State	Description
Fortuna	(United Kingdom of Great Britain and Ireland) Gibraltar	The ship was wrecked at the mouth of the Martil River. Her crew were rescued. She was on a voyage from Gibraltar to Tétouan, Morocco.

== 30 September ==
List of shipwrecks: 30 September 1820
Ship	State	Description
Alfred	(United Kingdom of Great Britain and Ireland) Guernsey	The ship was driven ashore on Skagen, Denmark. Her crew were rescued. She was on a voyage from Copenhagen, Denmark to Bergen, Norway. Alfred had been refloated by 5 October and was making for Aalborg, Denmark.

== Unknown date ==
List of shipwrecks: Unknown date in September 1820
Ship	State	Description
Active	United Kingdom	The ship foundered in the Irish Sea off Bardsey Island, Pembrokeshire with the loss of all hands. She was on a voyage from Waterford to Liverpool, Lancashire.
Duckenfield Hall	United Kingdom	The whaler was driven ashore and wrecked in the Orkney Islands. She was later refloated and found to have broken her back.
Elizabeth	United Kingdom	The ship was driven ashore at Barnstaple, Devon.
Farnham	United Kingdom	The ship was driven ashore at Beaumaris, Anglesey. She was on a voyage from Liverpool to Kiel, Prussia. Farnham was later refloated and put back to Liverpool for repairs.
Henry Lovett	United States	The ship was wrecked on the Île-à-Vache, Haiti in late September. Her crew were rescued. She was on a voyage from Kingston, Jamaica to Annapolis, Maryland.
Hope	United Kingdom	The ship foundered in the Baltic Sea off Bornholm, Denmark with the loss of three of her crew.
Jonge Anna	Prussia	The ship was lost whilst on a voyage from Emden to London, United Kingdom. Her crew were rescued.
St. Feodosia	Russia	The ship was driven ashore near Fredrikshamn, Grand Duchy of Finland. She was on a voyage from Saint Petersburg to Riga.
Villorious	United Kingdom	The ship was wrecked at Baracoa, Cuba. She was on a voyage from the River Plate to Havana, Cuba.
Vrow Christina	Netherlands	The ship was lost whilst on a voyage from the Elbe to Amsterdam, North Holland. Her crew were rescued.
