= Princess Charlotte =

Princess Charlotte may refer to:

== People ==
- Charlotte of the United Kingdom (disambiguation), various princesses
  - Princess Charlotte of Wales (born 2015), granddaughter of King Charles III and only daughter of William, Prince of Wales
- Charlotte of Württemberg (disambiguation), various princesses
- Charlotte Christine of Brunswick-Lüneburg (1694–1715), wife of Alexei Petrovich, Tsarevich of Russia, and mother of Peter II, Emperor of Russia
- Princess Charlotte of Monaco (1719–1790), Visitandine nun and daughter of Jacques I, Prince of Monaco
- Princess Charlotte of Denmark (1789–1864), wife of Prince William of Hesse-Kassel
- Alexandra Feodorovna (Charlotte of Prussia) (1798–1860), empress consort of Russia and princess of Prussia by birth
- Princess Charlotte of Prussia (1831–1855), Hereditary Princess of Saxe-Meiningen
- Charlotte of Belgium (1840–1927), empress consort of Mexico and princess of Belgium by birth
- Princess Charlotte of Prussia (1860–1919), Duchess of Saxe-Meiningen
- Charlotte of Schaumburg-Lippe (1864–1946), queen consort of Württemberg and princess by birth
- Charlotte, Grand Duchess of Luxembourg (1896–1985; r. 1919–1964), princess of Luxembourg by birth
- Princess Charlotte, Duchess of Valentinois (1898–1977), Hereditary Princess of Monaco

== Transportation ==
- Hired armed schooner Princess Charlotte, the name of several ships during the Napoleonic Wars
- HMS Princess Charlotte, the name of several ships of the Royal Navy
- Princess Charlotte, the name of a GWR 4000 Class locomotive
- Princess Charlotte (ship), the name of several ships

== Other uses ==
- Charlie Morningstar, the main protagonist of the animated musical series Hazbin Hotel (whose full name is Charlotte and holds the title Crown Princess of Hell)
- Princess Charlotte Bay, Queensland, Australia
- The Charlotte, a former music venue in Leicester, England, United Kingdom originally called The Princess Charlotte

== See also ==
- Charlotte Marie of Saxe-Jena (1669–1703), duchess consort of Saxe-Weimar and princess of the Holy Roman Empire
- Charlotte Aglaé d'Orléans (1700–1761), duchess consort of Modena and Reggio and French princess of the blood
- Charlotte Honorine Joséphine Pauline Bonaparte (1832–1901), daughter of Charles Lucien Bonaparte
- Charlotte Tiedemann (1919–1979), second wife of Infante Jaime, Duke of Segovia
- Archduchess Charlotte of Austria (1921–1989), second daughter of Charles I of Austria and IV of Hungary
- Princess Joséphine Charlotte of Belgium (1927–2005), grand duchess consort of Luxembourg
- Charlotte Casiraghi (born 1986), sometimes incorrectly called Princess Charlotte of Monaco
- Princess Charlotte of Wales (ship), launched in 1812
- Queen Charlotte (disambiguation)
- Charlotte (disambiguation)
  - Charlotte (given name)
