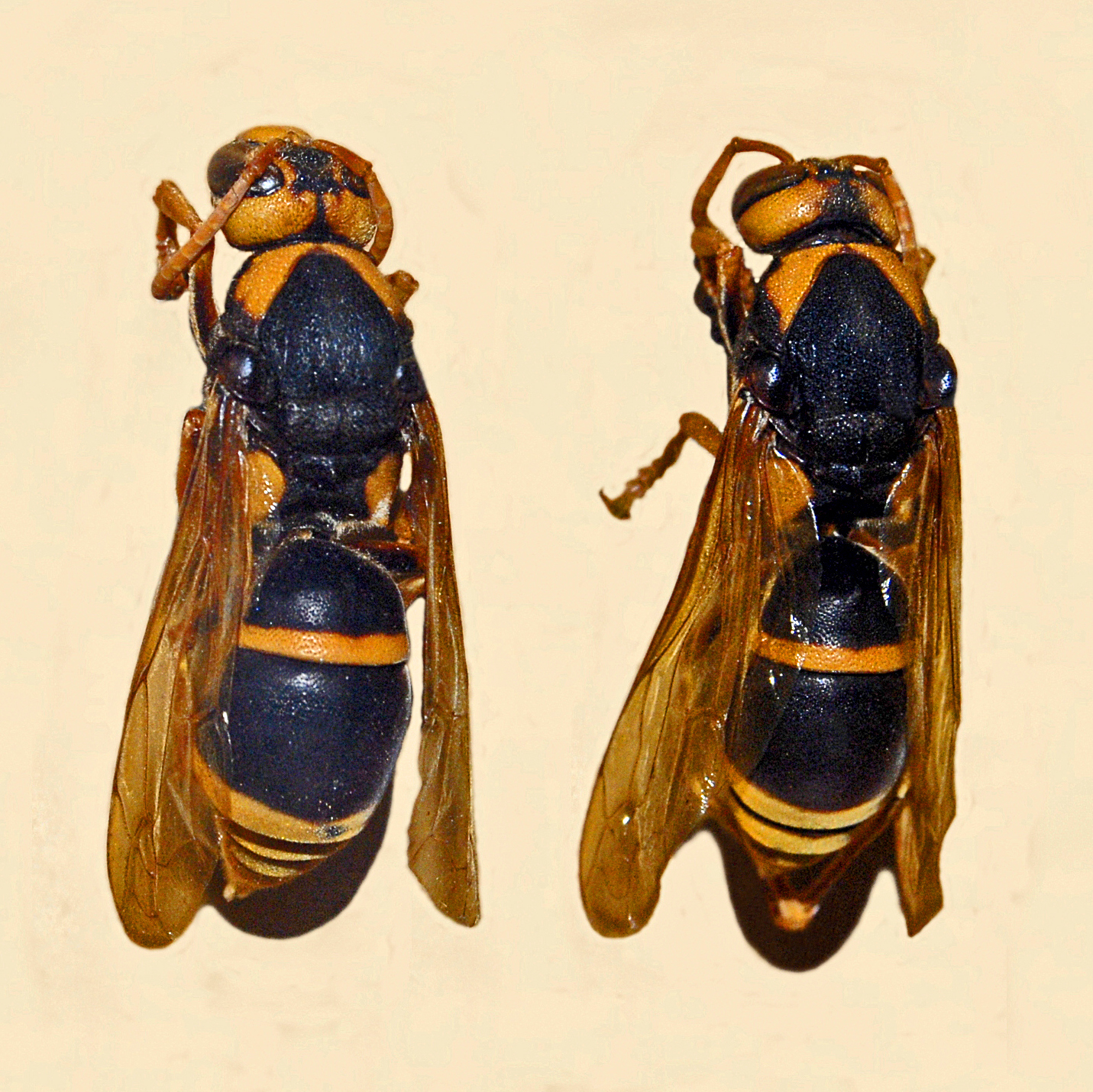
- Abispa splendida from New Guinea. Museum specimen

Scientific classification
- Kingdom: Animalia
- Phylum: Arthropoda
- Clade: Pancrustacea
- Class: Insecta
- Order: Hymenoptera
- Family: Vespidae
- Genus: Abispa
- Species: A. splendida

Binomial name
- Abispa splendida (Guérin, 1838)

Synonyms
- Odynerus splendidus Guerin, 1838; Abispa maculicollis Cameron, 1911; Abispa odyneroides Perkins, 1912

= Abispa splendida =

Species of wasp

Abispa splendida (also known as the large mud-nesting wasp or velvety black and yellow) is a species of wasp in the Vespidae family.

This species was first described as Odynerus splendidus by Guérin in 1838.

== Subspecies ==
- Abispa splendida australis (Smith, 1857)
- Abispa splendida maculicollis Cameron, 1911
- Abispa splendida odyneroides Perkins, 1912
- Abispa splendida splendida (Guérin, 1838)

== Description ==
Abispa splendida can reach a length of about 26 millimetres (1.0 in), with a forewings span of about 42 millimetres (1.7 in). Body is black and orange-yellow coloured. Thorax is black with yellow shoulders. Head, antenna and legs are yellow. The abdomen shows yellow and black segments. Wings are orange.

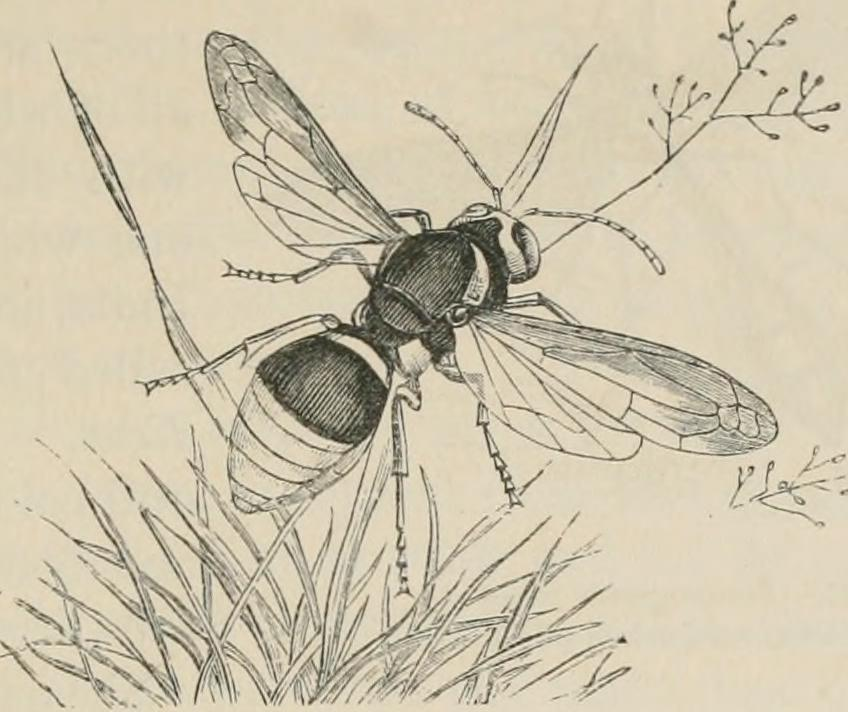
Illustration of Abispa splendida

== Behavior ==
These wasps build their mud nest under rocks or inside holes in trees. Larvae pupate in their pot. The golden yellow pupa reach a length of about 30 millimetres (1.2 in). The adults emerge from the nest after three months.

== Distribution ==
This species can be found in Australia and Indonesia.
