= Port Charlotte =

Port Charlotte may refer to the following places:

- Port Charlotte, Islay, Argyll and Bute, Scotland
  - Port Charlotte distillery
- Port Charlotte, Florida, United States
  - Port Charlotte High School

== See also ==
- Charlotte (disambiguation)
