= Abispa ruficornis =

Scientific classification
- Domain: Eukaryota
- Kingdom: Animalia
- Phylum: Arthropoda
- Class: Insecta
- Order: Hymenoptera
- Family: Vespidae
- Genus: Abispa
- Species: A. ruficornis

Binomial name
- Abispa ruficornis Vecht, 1960

Species of wasp

Abispa ruficornis is a species of wasp in the Vespidae family.
