= Sophia Charlotte =

Sophia Charlotte may refer to:

- Sophia Charlotte of Hanover (1668–1705), Queen of Prussia as wife of Frederick I of Prussia
- Charlotte of Mecklenburg-Strelitz (1744–1818), Queen of the United Kingdom as wife of George III

== See also ==
- Sophia (disambiguation)
- Charlotte (disambiguation)
- Sophie Charlotte (disambiguation)
