= Abispa australiana =

Scientific classification
- Domain: Eukaryota
- Kingdom: Animalia
- Phylum: Arthropoda
- Class: Insecta
- Order: Hymenoptera
- Family: Vespidae
- Genus: Abispa
- Species: A. australiana

Binomial name
- Abispa australiana Mitchell, 1838

Synonyms
- Vespa (Abispa) australiana Mitchell, 1838 Abispa australis Smith, 1857; Abispa splendida australis Smith, 1857

Species of wasp

Abispa australiana is a species of wasp in the Vespidae family. It was described as Vespa australiana by Thomas Livingstone Mitchell in 1838.

The Australian Faunal Directory describes it as being found in both the Northern Territory and New South Wales.
