= Hired armed lugger Aristocrat =

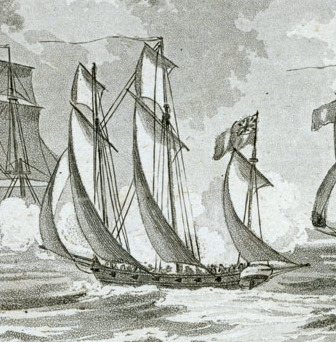
The Aristocrat

His Majesty's hired armed vessel Aristocrat served the Royal Navy, twice, as a lugger from 1794 to 1798, and as a brig from 1799 to 1801. She served with the Jersey-based Channel Islands flotilla under Commodore Philippe d'Auvergne, Prince of Bouillon. As a lugger she participated in two notable engagements, the second of which won for her crew the Naval General Service Medal, awarded some 50 years later. As a brig, she captured two privateers.

== HM hired armed lugger Aristocrat ==
On her first contract, Aristocrat served from 2 November 1794 to 9 December 1798. The owner and original master of the vessel were Mr Henry Wilkins. She was armed with four 6-pounder and eight 4-pounder guns. She was of 172 tons (bm), and Admiralty records later give her armament as twenty-two 4-pounder guns.

In 1793, at the beginning of the French Revolutionary Wars, the Governor of Jersey Alexander Lindsay had opened communications between England and the Royalists. Lindsay was then transferred to Jamaica in 1794, and Commodore d'Auvergne picked up where Lindsay left off. d'Auvergne used his vessels, and particularly Aristocrat after she arrived, to support a network of spies, bring French emigres out, and support insurgents by smuggling arms, ammunition, and supplies across the short stretch of water to the French mainland.

There exist records in the National Archives of the number of emigres carried onboard Aristocrat by d'Auvergne's order over the period 4 March 1795 to 2 September 1797. Wilkins provided the date of embarkation and the passengers' expenses. Wilkins and his activities were such an annoyance that the Revolutionary authorities offered a reward of 2,000 livres for his capture.

=== Action of 15 July 1795 ===
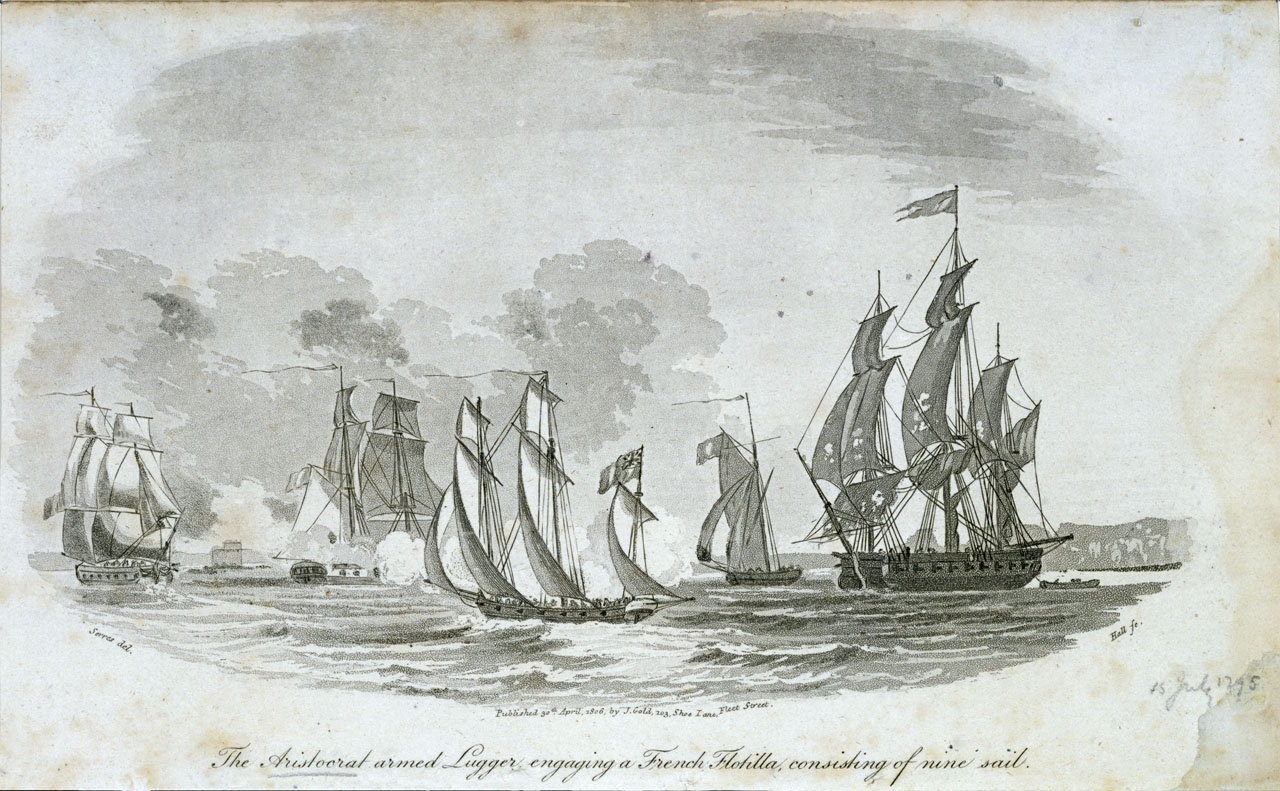
The Aristocrat armed lugger engaging a French flotilla, consisting of nine sail, the action of 15 July 1795, an aquatint after John Thomas Serres

It was on one of these extraction trips that Aristocrat had to battle for her survival. On 15 July 1795, she had picked up eight emigres and a Mr. Prejant, most of the agents (spies). Her passengers informed Wilkins that orders had arrived at St Malo for the authorities to send out every armed vessel they could to chase off Aristocrat, or better, to capture her. To avoid the pursuit, Wilkins sailed for the islands of Chozé. Wilkins wanted to anchor there, but the arrival of a French cutter that he had encountered earlier led him to engage. Wilkins gave up his pursuit when the cutter took refuge under the guns of a strong shore battery. As Aristocrat sailed away, she encountered a flotilla of French vessels, with the cutter has come up again, though maintaining a respectful distance. Wilkins's passengers expressed their concern that they would be executed if captured. Wilkins, who also had no desire to be captured, assured them that if capture was imminent, he would blow up Aristocrat, which was carrying 123 barrels of gunpowder for the insurgents, in addition to her regular store.

By 10:30 am a general engagement had developed, with Aristocrat in the center of a French flotilla that consisted of nine vessels: Société Populaire (ship; 16 × 8-pounder long guns), Diligente (brig; twelve 12-pounder guns), Brave (brig; four 36-pounders), Hirondelle (brig; twelve 6-pounder guns), Furet (brig; twelve 4-pounder guns), Harmonie (brig; four 24-pounder guns), Terreur (cutter; ten 4-pounder guns), Marat (cutter; ten 4-pounder guns), and Furette (lugger; three 24-pounder guns). (Note: Wilkins in his account in the Naval Chronicle identifies Hirondelle, of 12 guns, as the Rondel of 14 guns. However, there is no French vessel with the name Rondel, and French records identify Hirondelle as being involved in an action near St Malo on 14 May. Wilkins's Furette is unidentifiable. One possibility is Leverette, but linking facts are absent.)

A running fight continued along the coast, which became lined with spectators watching the engagement, as Aristocrat tacked first one way and then another. Finally, after dark, Aristocrat lost her pursuers. When she reached the Minques rocks south of Jersey, Wilkins anchored, his crew exhausted after some 18 hours of running battle. Aristocrat had suffered no casualties. Commodore d'Auvergne sent a Mr. J. Richardson to Saint-Malo under a flag of truce. He reported that Societé Populaire was badly shot up, had had heavy casualties, and had five of her guns dismounted. Diligence had had five men killed and several wounded. Lastly, one of the cutters had been so holed that she had reached port with seven feet of water in her hold.

=== "Port Spergui" ===
In March, Lieutenant George M'Kinley, of the brig Liberty, and Lieutenant Abraham Gossett in Aristocrat had chased a French convoy consisting of a corvette, two luggers, four brigs, and two sloops, which had taken refuge in Spergui Bay (Erquy; also Herqui, Bouche d'Arkie or Bay of Erqui), near Cap Fréhel. Sir William Sidney Smith arrived in his 38-gun frigate Diamond, and proceeded to blockade the port while taking soundings. On 18 March 1796 at noon he sailed in, with M'Kinley and Gossett having volunteered to go in too; as they were under Commodore d'Auvergne's command, Smith could not order them to do so.

The French had two shore batteries, one of one 24-pounder on one side, and another of two 24-pounders, augmented by a third gun on a higher point, on the other. As the three British warships sailed into the port, they were able quickly to silence the one-gun battery, but the other three guns remained a problem. Smith sent in a landing party under his first lieutenant Horace Pine and Lieutenant Edmund Carter of the Royal Marines. This party faced intense small arms fire from the garrison of the battery, who had descended to the beach. The landing party then scrambled ashore at another point and scaled the precipice, getting to the guns before the men on the beach could regain their position. The landing party spiked the guns and then withdrew, suffering only one casualty, Lieutenant Carter, who was mortally wounded.

The British succeeded in setting fire to all but one lugger, which kept up its fire throughout the action. French records report that during the engagement, the commander of the corvette Étourdie, lieutenant de vaisseau Dusaulchoy, was killed. The crew then set fire to the vessel to prevent the British from capturing her and abandoned her. (Smith's report credits a boarding party with firing Étourdie). Throughout the action, Aristocrat covered the British boats. British casualties totalled two men killed and seven wounded, including lieutenants Pine and Carter, again, the latter mortally.

In 1847 the Admiralty awarded the Naval General Service Medal with clasp "Port Spergui", to the four surviving claimants from the three ships that had taken part in the attack.

=== Re-fitting ===
Apparently, when Aristocrat's contract was over, Wilkins took her into dock for repair. At the government's express stipulation, he had her converted to a brig. (Note: The author of the story in the Naval Chronicle makes a number of statements that appear in error. Aristocrat was converted to a brig during the war, not after it. As the action at Port Spergui shows, the Admiralty had already put a lieutenant in command well before she became a brig. This was the normal practice. It was equally normal that the master stayed on as master, but subordinate to the navy lieutenant. It is possible that Wilkins served on Aristocrat as master until she went off her second contract towards the end of the French Revolutionary Wars. He would have remained her owner throughout. On 5 June 1806 he received a letter of marque for the schooner Alarm, of 106 tons (bm), 50 men, and fourteen 3-pounder guns. Then on 16 December 1808 he received a letter of marque for the schooner Alarm, of 107 tons (bm), 20 men, and ten 4-pounder guns.)

== HM hired armed brig Aristocrat ==
On her second contract, Aristocrat served from 13 November 1799 until 14 November 1801. Admiralty records describe the brig as being of 161 90/94tons (bm), and carrying eighteen 4-pounder guns.

In December 1799, her captain, Lieutenant Corbet James d'Auvergne, Commodore d'Auvergne's half-brother, had urgent business to settle onshore when Commodore d'Auvergne needed to send Aristocrat on a mission. The commodore appointed Lieutenant Nicholas Wray, first lieutenant of Bravo, acting captain of Aristocrat. On her way back from the mission on 30 December, she encountered a privateer out of Saint Malo. After a five-hour chase, Aristocrat succeeded in capturing the Avanture (or Aventure), of fourteen 4 and 2-pounder guns, and 42 men. She was ten days out of St Malo but had not yet captured anything. There was a gale that night and the prize's rigging was so shot-up that on 1 January 1800 Wray brought Aristocrat and Avanture into Plymouth rather than Jersey.

On 19 February 1800, Aristocrat was again under Lieutenant d'Auvergne's command when she fell in with a French gunvessel. After an hour's chase, Gun Vessel No. 57 struck about half a mile from Cap Fréhel. The gun vessel was armed with one iron 24-pounder gun in her bow and had some small arms. She was under the command of Enseigne de vaisseau Cityoyen Rouilland and was 24 hours out from the River Fegué on her way to Saint Malo. Several of her crew and passengers escaped on a boat before she struck, and one man drowned while attempting to escape by swimming.

== Fate ==
It is not clear what became of Aristocrat after the end of her second contract. Wilkins may have sold her as he later appears as captain of the hired armed schooner Princess Charlotte in 1805-6, and then as master on two subsequent letters of marque.
