= Sophie Charlotte =

Sophie Charlotte may refer to:

- Sophie Charlotte of Hesse-Kassel (1678–1749), princess of Hesse-Kassel
- Charlotte Christine of Brunswick-Lüneburg (1694–1715), German duchess
- Princess Charlotte Sophie of Saxe-Coburg-Saalfeld (1731–1810), German duchess
- Duchess Sophie Charlotte in Bavaria (1847–1897), Duchess of Alençon and born Duchess in Bavaria
- Sophie Charlotte (actress), German-Brazilian actress Sophie Charlotte Wolf da Silva (born 1989)

== See also ==
- Sophie (disambiguation)
- Charlotte (disambiguation)
- Sophia Charlotte (disambiguation)
