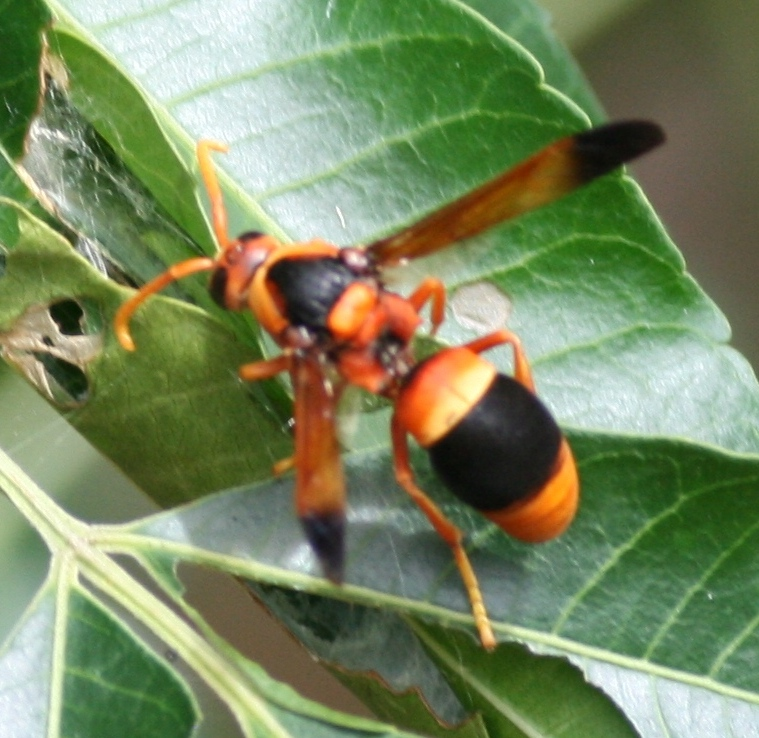
- Abispa ephippium

Scientific classification
- Kingdom: Animalia
- Phylum: Arthropoda
- Clade: Pancrustacea
- Class: Insecta
- Order: Hymenoptera
- Family: Vespidae
- Subfamily: Eumeninae
- Genus: Abispa; Mitchell, 1838

Synonyms
- Monerebia Saussure, 1852

= Abispa =

Genus of wasps

Abispa is a genus of large Australasian potter wasps belonging to the subfamily Eumeninae. The genus was first described in 1838 by Thomas Livingstone Mitchell.

Species of this genus are found throughout Australia, while Abispa splendida (Guerin, 1838) is found in both New Guinea and Australia.

== Species ==
- Abispa australiana
- Abispa ephippium, the "Australian hornet"
- Abispa eximia
- Abispa laticincta
- Abispa meadewaldensis
- Abispa ruficornis
- Abispa splendida
