= Queen Charlotte Sound =

Queen Charlotte Sound may refer to:

- Queen Charlotte Sound (Canada), in British Columbia
- Queen Charlotte Sound / Tōtaranui, Marlborough District, New Zealand

== See also ==
- Queen Charlotte (disambiguation)
