= PTKM-1R =

Modern Russian anti-tank mine

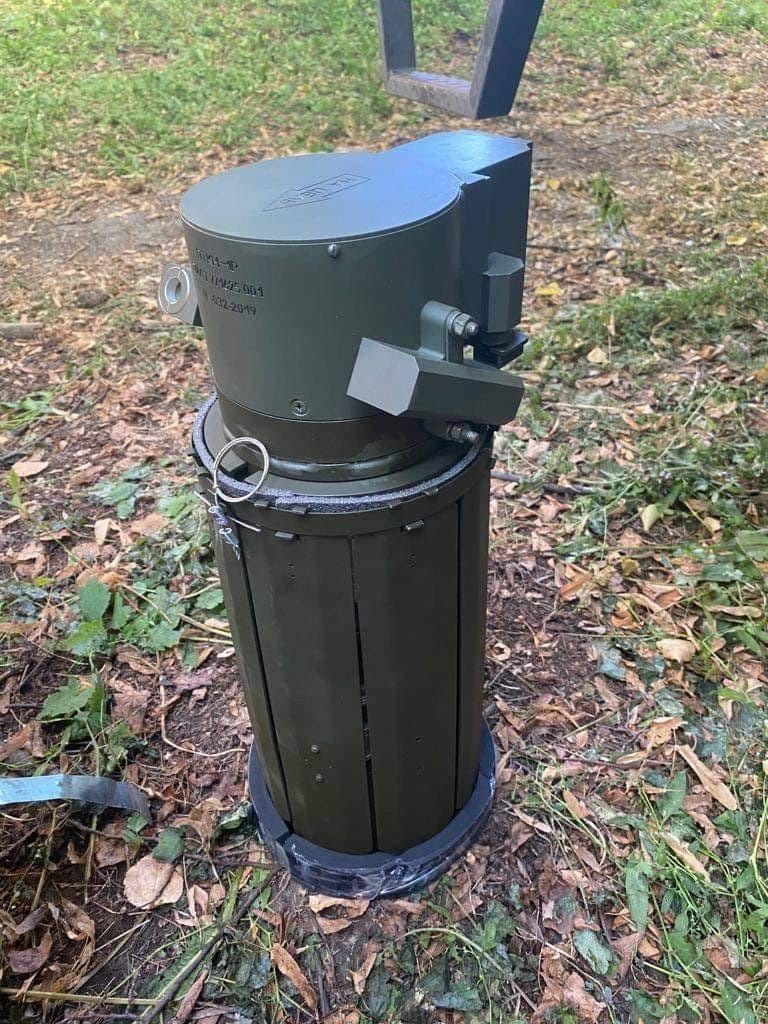
- An unused PTKM-1R mine with legs retracted
- Type: Top-attack anti-tank mine
- Place of origin: Russia

Service history
- In service: 2020-present
- Wars: Russian invasion of Ukraine

Production history
- Designed: 2018
- Produced: 2020-present

Specifications
- Mass: 10 kg (mine); 25 kg (container with mine)
- Height: 510 mm
- Diameter: 220 mm
- Effective firing range: 5-50m
- Filling weight: 4.2 kg TG-40/60

PTKM-1R is an autonomous top-attack anti-tank mine developed in Russia.

== History ==
In 2018, the Ministry of Defence announced that development of the PTKM-1R was nearly complete, with prototypes already being evaluated. Serial production began in 2020, with deliveries to the military beginning the same year.

== Design ==
The base of the PTKM-1R is equipped with 2 seismic and 4 acoustic sensors to detect approaching vehicles from up to 100 meters away. The system has an independent internal payload equipped with additional sensors which is launched above the target, and then fires an explosively formed penetrator downward into the roof of the enemy vehicle.

The mine is very similar in concept to the M93 Hornet developed by Textron in the late 1980s.

== Operation ==
The system compares the collected sensor data against an internal database to determine the identity and position of vehicles in its vicinity. Once a suitable target is detected, the upper portion of the housing rotates and tilts towards the enemy vehicle. When the target is within engagement distance, the top cover detaches, and an autonomous submunition equipped with infrared and radar sensors is launched approximately 30 meters in the air over the target. Using these sensors, the submunition aims directly at the top of the enemy vehicle before firing its penetrator slug, in order to take advantage of the relatively vulnerable roof typical of most armored vehicles.

The mine can only be deployed manually. The 8 legs are released simultaneously by pulling the pin (seen in the photo), which also deploys the 4 cardioid microphones (as well as the two seismic sensors on the legs) and reveals a small panel near the bottom which is used to arm the mine. Once deployed, the mine can remain active for up to 10 days before it self-destructs to minimize the risk to civilians and friendly forces.

== Operational history ==
The PTKM-1R mine has been used in the Russian invasion of Ukraine. In 2022, the SSO posted photos on social media of a captured PTKM-1R mine in Kharkiv, still in its wooden transportation case.

== Specifications ==
- Mine length: 900 mm
- Container length: 1000 mm
- Effect: penetrates 100 mm of armour at a range of up to 100 m
- Target sensor: seismic; sensitivity against a tank 120 m
- Operational life: 30 days
- Body: steel

== See also ==
- XM1100 Scorpion
