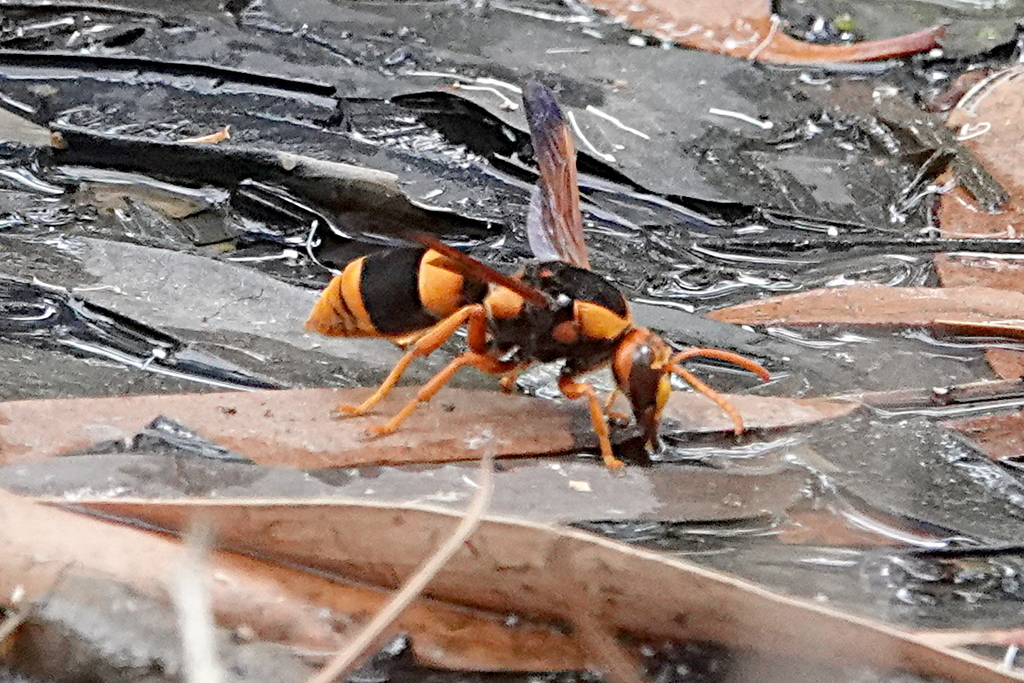
- (photo by Pete Woodall, at Saltwater Creek, Lakefield QLD)

Scientific classification
- Domain: Eukaryota
- Kingdom: Animalia
- Phylum: Arthropoda
- Class: Insecta
- Order: Hymenoptera
- Family: Vespidae
- Genus: Abispa
- Species: A. laticincta

Binomial name
- Abispa laticincta Vecht, 1960

Synonyms
- Abispa laticincta laticincta Vecht, 1960; Abispa laticincta melanopleura Vecht, 1960

= Abispa laticincta =

Species of wasp

Abispa laticincta is a species of wasp in the Vespidae family.

It was first described by Jacobus van der Vecht in 1960 from a female specimen found in Cooktown, Queensland.
