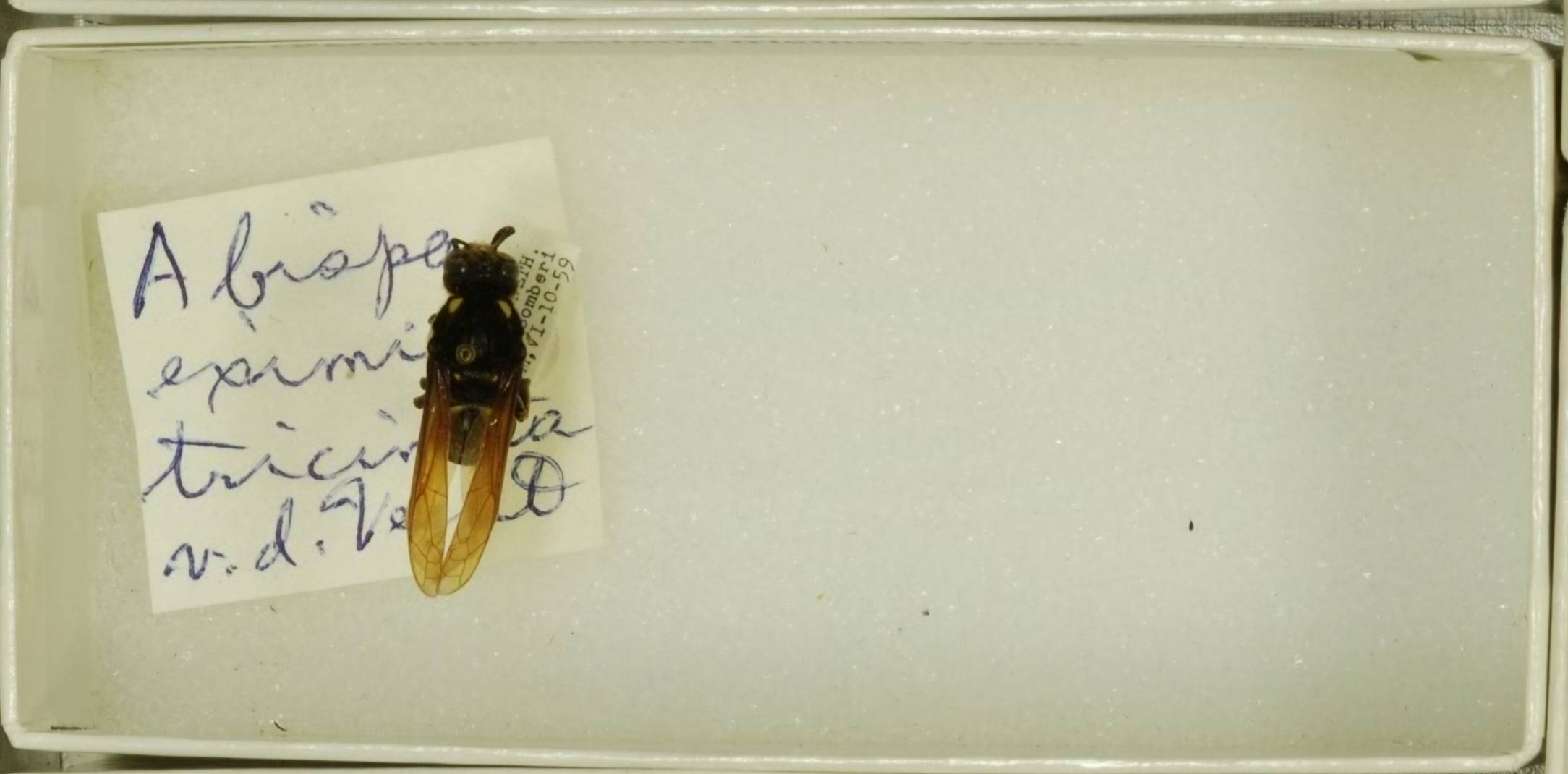

Scientific classification
- Domain: Eukaryota
- Kingdom: Animalia
- Phylum: Arthropoda
- Class: Insecta
- Order: Hymenoptera
- Family: Vespidae
- Genus: Abispa
- Species: A. eximia

Binomial name
- Abispa eximia (Smith, 1865)

Synonyms
- Abispa eximia eximia (Smith, 1865); Abispa eximia tricincta Vecht, 1960

= Abispa eximia =

Species of wasp

Abispa eximia is a species of wasp in the Vespidae family.
