= Cootamundra High School =

Secondary school located in Cootamundra, New South Wales, Australia

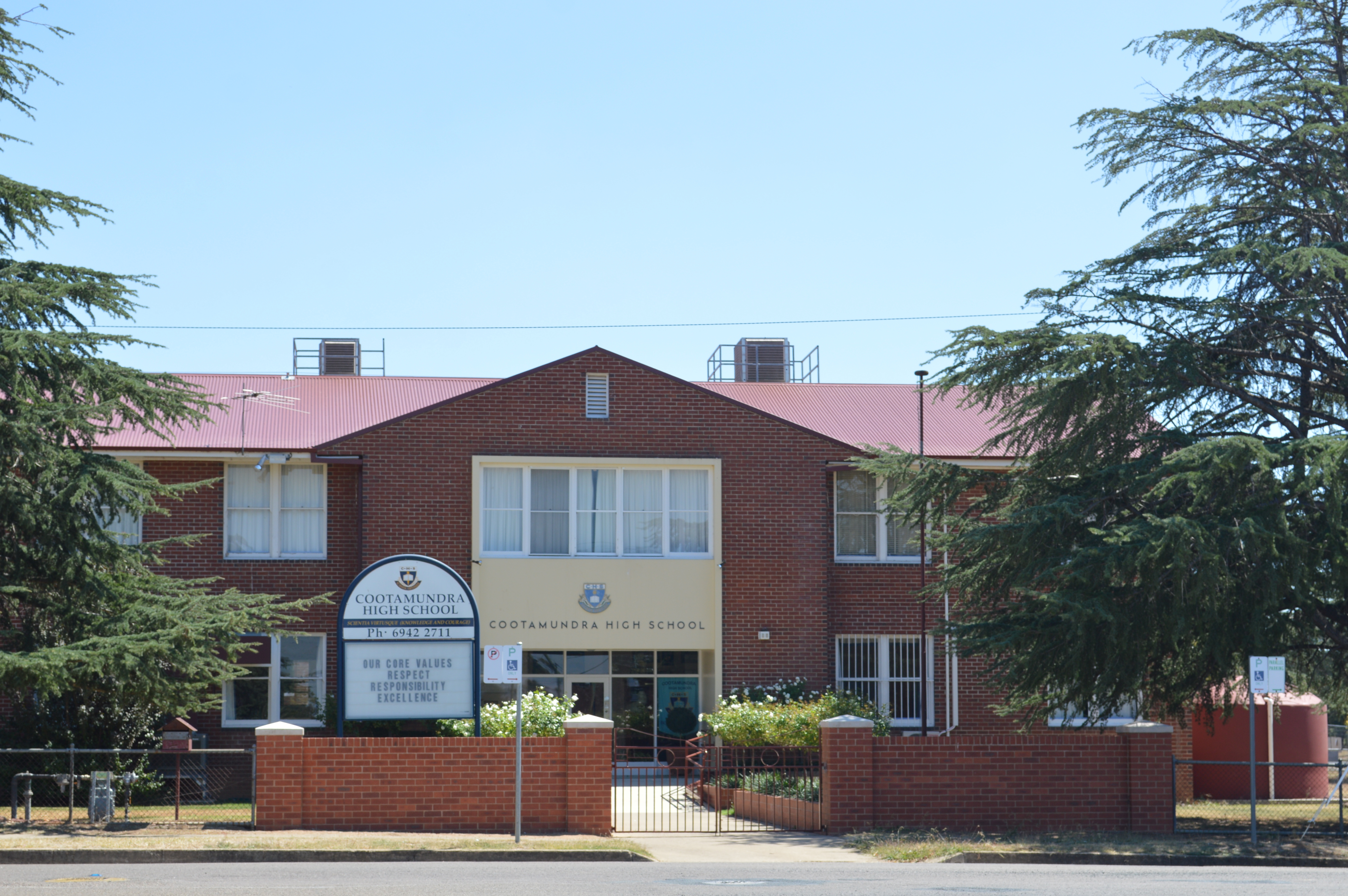
- Cootamundra High School main entrance, pictured in 2015

Location
- 20-22 Poole Street, Cootamundra, New South Wales, Australia; 34°38′7″S 148°1′4″E

Information
- School type: Government-funded co-educational comprehensive secondary day school
- Motto: Latin: Scientia Virtusque (Knowledge and Courage)
- Established: 1955; 71 years ago
- School district: Riverina
- Educational authority: NSW Department of Education
- Principal: Leesa Daly
- Teaching staff: 32.2 FTE (2024)
- Years: 7–12
- Enrollment: 215 (2024)
- Campus type: Regional
- Houses: Anderson, Baldry, McConaghy, Pinkstone
- Colors: Blue, Gold and White
- Slogan: Respect, Responsibility, Excellence
- Feeder schools: Cootamundra Public School, EA Southee Public School, Stockinbingal Public School, Eurongilly Public School
- Website: cootamundr-h.schools.nsw.gov.au
- Last updated: 01-07-2025

Cootamundra High School (abbreviated as CHS) is a government-funded co-educational comprehensive secondary day school, established in 1955 and located on Poole Street, in the Riverina town of Cootamundra, New South Wales, Australia.

The school hosted 215 students in 2024, from Year 7 to Year 12, of whom nineteen percent identified as Indigenous Australians and five percent were from a language background other than English. The school is operated by the NSW Department of Education; the principal is Leesa Daly. Alongside serving two feeder primary schools in Cootamundra, CHS also serves Stockinbingal Public School, located in Stockinbingal, approximately twenty kilometres north-west of Cootamundra, and Eurongilly Public School, located in Eurongilly, approximately forty-two kilometres south-west of Cootamundra.

== History ==
Upon its recognition as a full and separate high school in 1955, Cootamundra High School became the first state secondary school to be established in Cootamundra, it is the oldest still operating and is the only government-funded secondary school in the town. Originally located on what is now the grounds of Cootamundra Public School, in 1958, Cootamundra High School moved from Cooper Street to its current location upon Church Hill, where several pre-existing buildings were present. From there, additional wings were constructed to accommodate for a growing number of students.

== Campus ==
Cootamundra High School is situated on six hectares of land west of Cootamundra's CBD, it consists of seven brick buildings, four of which are double-storey. The school contains two cooking rooms, wood-work and metal-work shops, agriculture plot, two hockey fields, two sheltered basketball courts, rugby and football field, cricket oval, three computer labs, assembly hall, library, small observatory, and recently upgraded science labs. Cootamundra High School is also located directly next to the TAFE Cootamundra campus, providing further, more accessible learning opportunities to students.

== See also ==
- List of government schools in New South Wales: A-F
- List of schools in the Riverina
- Education in Australia
