= Chaparral High School =

Chaparral High School may refer to many high schools in the United States, and 4 in California:

- Chaparral High School (Arizona), in Scottsdale
- Chaparral High School (Colorado), in Parker
- Chaparral High School (Kansas), in Anthony
- Chaparral High School (Nevada), in Las Vegas, also partly in Paradise
- Chaparral High School (New Mexico), in Chaparral
- Chaparral High School (El Cajon, California)
- Chaparral High School (Temecula, California)
- Chaparral High School (Ojai, California)
- Chaparral High School (Phelan, California)
- Chaparral High School (Texas), in Killeen
