= Hull Hornets =

Former American Football team based in the United Kingdom (2005–2010)

Logo

General information
- Founded: 2005
- Folded: 2010
- Stadium: Brantingham Park, Kingston upon Hull, East Riding of Yorkshire

League / conference affiliations
- BAFA Community Leagues

Championships
- League championships: 0 None
- Division championships: 0 None

Uniform

Home

Hull Hornets were a British American football team based in Kingston upon Hull. Formed in 2005, they competed for five seasons before ending their membership in BAFA in 2010.

The City of Hull remained without a BAFA League team until 2015, when the Humber Warhawks were accepted into the league.

== History ==
=== Background ===
The area has a long history of American football and traces its roots back to the early eighties when a team was formed under the name of the Hull Kingston Liberators. The team underwent some name changes through the eighties, becoming the Kingston Liberators and then the Humberside Liberators before they disbanded in the early nineties. After the Liberators, the Hull Pirates Youth Squad were formed to fill the gap and they notched up a third overall place in the national league in their first and only season. The Hull Rockets was the next development of the sport in the area; they came to an end after only a few years, leaving the only remaining American football team in the area, the Kingston Barbarians, who entered the British Senior League in 2001 but pulled out after just two games.

=== Team formation ===
The Hornets were formed in August 2005 by Graham McCoid and Chris Evers, who were both involved with teams in Hull throughout the years and ended up at the Doncaster (now the South Yorkshire) Mustangs. They both wanted to see American football come back to Hull and so the Hornets were formed. As they wanted to encourage growth of the sport within the area, the decision was also made to develop a youth side associated with the senior team that would play in their own league and act as a feeder for the senior team. The youth team is a work in progress but it still remains a goal of the club. On 5 November 2006, the team acquired full member status of BAFL.

The Hornets finished the 2008 season with a record of three wins, four defeats and three draws, with a total of 94 points scored and 143 points conceded, finishing the season in fourth place out of six teams. The Hornets' season finished on a sour note as they were unable to complete two of their games, against Tamworth Phoenix and Leicester Falcons. The Tamworth home game had been cancelled due to a lack of officials and the fixture could not be re-arranged, whereas the Leicester away game was postponed due to the emergency services not being present. Therefore, the Hornets only actually played eight league games and their slight playoff chances faded when the League awarded draws in both of those two games.

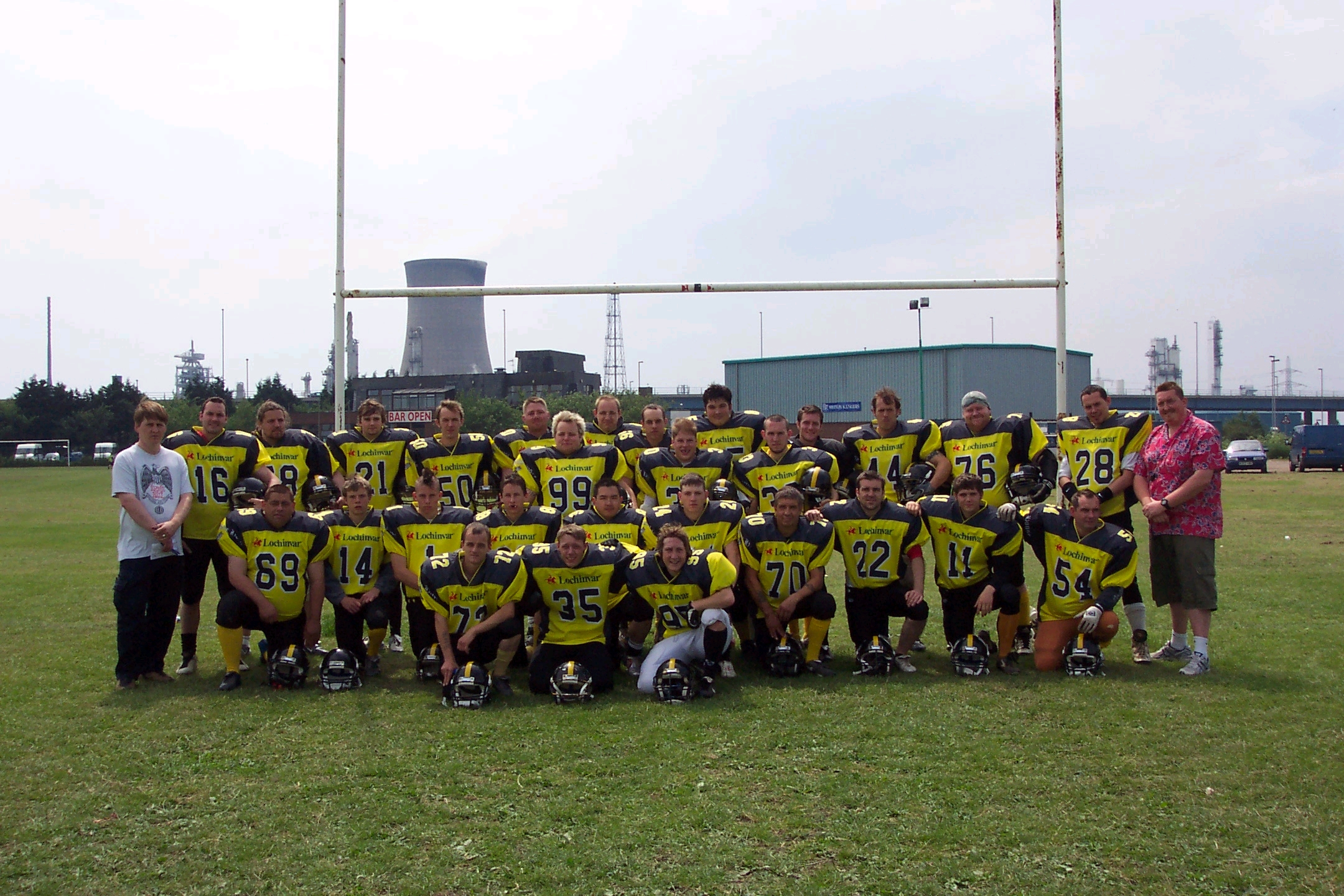
The Hull Hornets in 2006

=== Senior team season records ===
Season	Division	Win	Loss	Tie	PF	PA	Final position	Playoff record	Notes
2007	BAFL Division Two Central	3	7	0	166	211	3 / 5	—	—
2008	BAFL Division Two Central	3	4	3	94	143	4 / 6	—	—
2009	BAFL Division Two North	2	8	0	92	294	4 / 4	—	—

=== 2008 results ===
2008; pre-season; South Yorkshire Mustangs scrimmage at home. W 21–7?

	Team	Date	Kick-off	Result
Hull Hornets @	Shropshire Revolution	26 April 2808	2.30 pm	W 10–0
Hull Hornets @	Lincolnshire Bombers	04/05/08	2.30 pm	W 35–10
Hull Hornets vs	Nottingham Caesars	18/05/08	2.30 pm	L 6–41
Hull Hornets vs	Leicester Falcons	1 June 2008	2.30 pm	D 6–6
Hull Hornets @	Nottingham Caesars	08/06/08	2.30 pm	L 3–20
Hull Hornets vs	Shropshire Revolution	13/07/08	2.30 pm	L 6–34
Hull Hornets vs	Lincolnshire Bombers	27/07/08	2.30 pm	W 28–6
Hull Hornets @	Tamworth Phoenix	24/08/08	2.30 pm	L 0–26

=== 2009 results ===
	Team	Date	Kick-off	Result
Hull Hornets @	Lancashire Wolverines	19/04/09	2.30 pm	L 6–19
Hull Hornets Vs	Manchester Titans	26/04/09	2.30pm	L 14–27
Hull Hornets @	Chester Romans	17/05/09	2.30pm	L 0–12
Hull Hornets vs	Highland Wildcats	24/05/09	1.00pm	W 28–3
Hull Hornets Vs	Lancashire Wolverines	07/06/09	2.30pm	L 8–34
Hull Hornets @	Edinburgh Wolves	13/06/09	2.30pm	L 20–63
Hull Hornets vs	Clyde Valley Blackhawks	28/06/09	2.30pm	L 0–40
Hull Hornets Vs	Chester Romans	12/07/09	2.30pm	W 14–12
Hull Hornets @	Glasgow Tigers	09/08/09	4.00pm	L 0–32
Hull Hornets @	Manchester Titans	16/08/09	2.30pm	L 2–54

== Locations ==
=== Home games ===
The team have moved to Brantingham Park in Elloughton just outside Hull; this change of venue gives the Hornets a top-flight pitch with grandstand facilities including clubhouse and bar serving drinks and food during the game. Most games are played on Sundays, although some are played on Saturdays. The usual kick-off time is 2.30 pm.

For the 2010 season, training was moved to Oak Dene playing fields, Beverley Road opposite the Cross Keys pub. Training is Thursday nights 6 pm till 8 pm and Sundays 10:30 am to 1 pm.
