= Charlotte County =

Charlotte County may refer to:

- Charlotte County, New Brunswick, Canada
- Charlotte County, Florida, United States
- Charlotte County, Virginia, United States
- Mecklenburg County, North Carolina, United States
- The former name of Washington County, New York, United States
- Charlotte County, Province of New York, a county in colonial America
