= Charlotte High School (Texas) =

Public school in Texas, United States

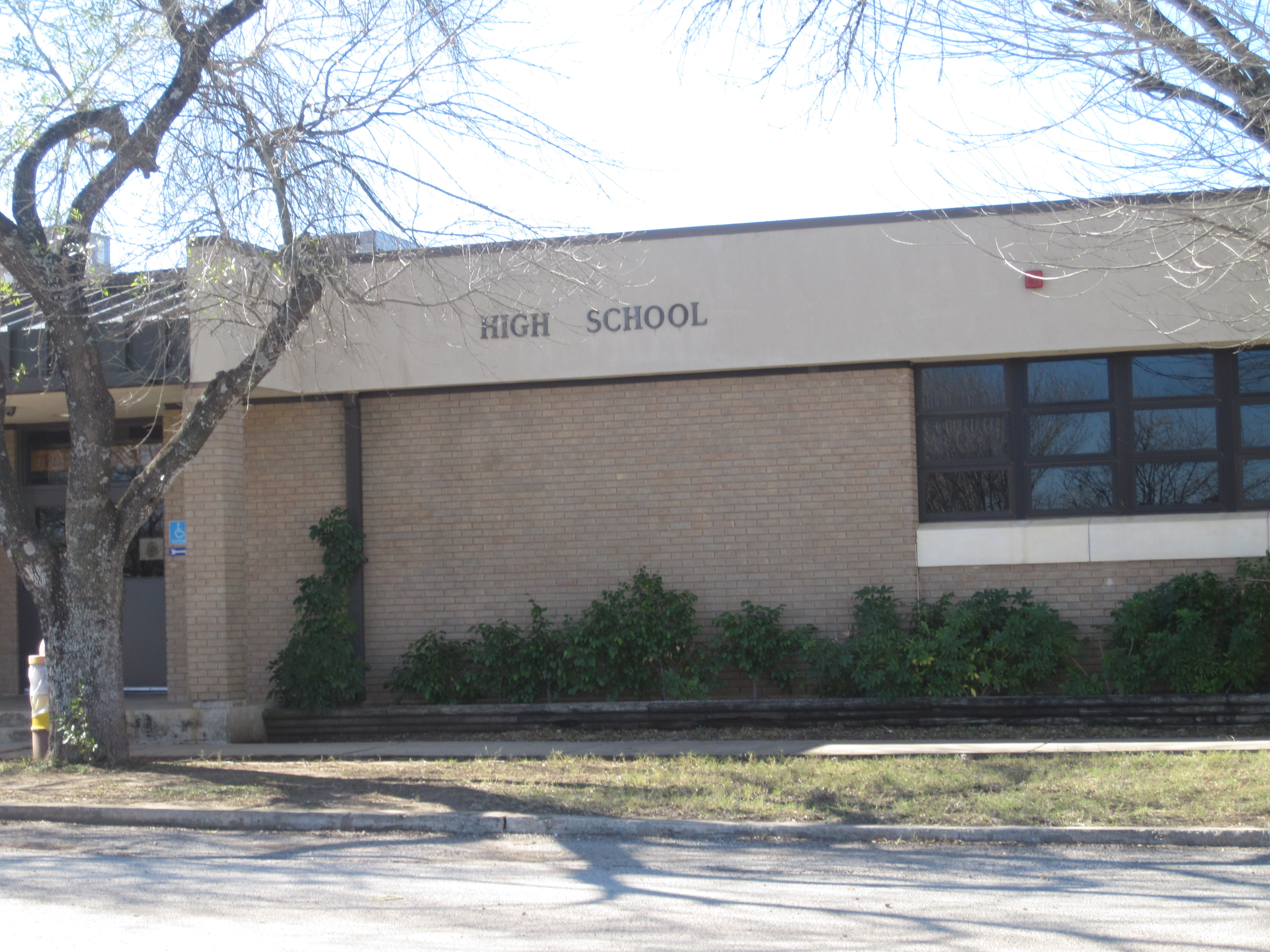

Location
- 70 Trojan Drive; Charlotte, Atascosa County, Texas 78011-0489; United States; 28.862153°N 98.702206°W

Information
- School type: Public, high school
- Locale: Rural: Distant
- School district: Charlotte ISD
- NCES School ID: 481371000863
- Principal: Sandra Nix
- Staff: 17.50 (on an FTE basis)
- Grades: 9–12
- Enrollment: 137 (2023–2024)
- Student to teacher ratio: 7.83
- Colors: Maroon & Gold
- Athletics conference: UIL Class 2A
- Mascot: Trojan/Lady Trojan
- Yearbook: Trojan
- Website: Official site

Charlotte High School is a public high school located in Charlotte, Texas (USA) and classified as a 2A school by the UIL. It is part of the Charlotte Independent School District located in central Atascosa County. During 2023–2024, Charlotte High School had an enrollment of 137 students and a student to teacher ratio of 7.83. The school received an overall rating of "D" from the Texas Education Agency for the 2024–2025 school year.

== Athletics ==
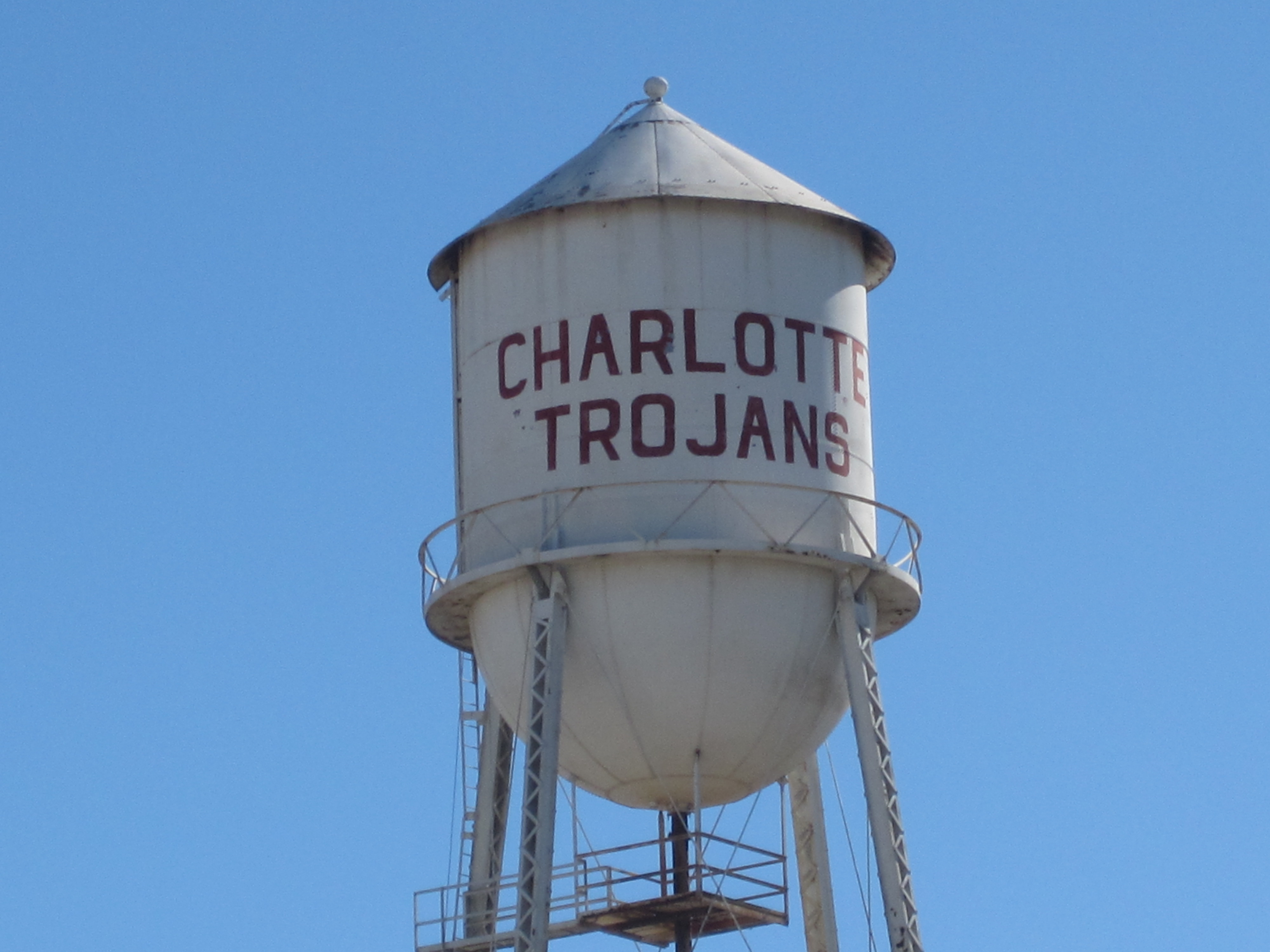
Local water tower

The Charlotte Trojans compete in these sports:

- Baseball
- Basketball
- Cross Country
- Football
- Golf
- Powerlifting
- Softball
- Track and Field
- Volleyball
