= Charlotta Pisinger =

Danish medical doctor, professor

Charlotta Holm Pisinger
- Born: 19 December 1960 (age 65); Prague, Czechoslovakia
- Education: University of Copenhagen
- Occupations: medical doctor, professor
- Known for: Danish professor in tobacco prevention

Charlotta Holm Pisinger (born 19 December 1960) is a Danish medical doctor, an expert on tobacco-related health issues, and the first Danish professor in tobacco prevention, at the University of Copenhagen.

== Early life ==
Charlotta Pisinger was born on 19 December 1960, in Prague, Czechoslovakia. She earned a master's degree in 1988, a PhD in 2004, and an MPH in 2007, all from the University of Copenhagen.

== Career ==
Pisinger is professor in tobacco prevention, at the University of Copenhagen, and an associate professor at the University of Southern Denmark.

Pisinger is chairman of the European Respiratory Society tobacco control committee, and a former president of the Danish Society for Tobacco Research. She sits on the directory board for Danish Epidemiological Society and is a member of the Danish Heart Foundation research evaluation committee.

Pisinger is a prominent sceptic of e-cigarettes, and in September 2019, was quoted as the subject of an article in The Observer:

In Europe we have banned flavours from cigarettes because we know it attracts young people to smoking ... Cigarettes should taste like cigarettes not like candy. E-cigarettes taste like candy and, frequently, we see in small shops where they are sold, e-cigarettes on one side and candy on the other. Of course it attracts children.
