= Murder of Hanna Charlotta Bäcklund =

2008 murder in Phuket, Thailand

Hanna Charlotta Bäcklund
- Location of Mai Khao Beach
- Location: 8°08′08″N 98°17′55″E; Mai Khao Beach, Phuket, Thailand
- Date: 14 March 2008; 18 years ago (ICT)
- Weapon: Knife
- Deaths: 1
- Victim: 1
- Perpetrator: Akkaradej "Chon" Tunkae
- Motive: Rape
- Charges: Murder, rape
- Verdict: Guilty
- Convictions: Life imprisonment

The Hanna Charlotta Backlund case involves the murder of a 27-year-old Swedish woman named Hanna Charlotta Bäcklund on the northern tip of the island of Phuket, Thailand, on 14 March 2008.

On the afternoon of the day of her death, Bäcklund asked her travel companion to join her for a walk on the beach but her friend stayed at the grounds of the hotel on Mai Khao Beach, where they camped in a tent. When Backlund failed to return, the friend went looking for her and found her body in the sand. She was attacked and, after fighting back, stabbed in the neck. Furthermore, she had apparent knife wounds on her body and her left hand. Police said they feared any clues left in the sand had been washed away by waves.

On 18 March 2008, Thai police issued a warrant for the arrest of 31-year-old Akaradet Thatchai Tankay, a Moken sea gypsy who police believe murdered Hanna. Described as a pool cleaner and gardener, police received reports of his tendency to spy on female tourists on the beach and believed he had fled to the Chumphon region of Thailand. Later, on the night of March 18, 2008, police arrested Akkaradej "Chon" Tunkae at Ranong Kraburi district with the assistance of the suspect's father and relatives after he had made contact with them from Burma expressing a desire to surrender. Akkaradej admitted he stabbed and killed Backlund after he failed to rape her.
