= Charlotte High School =

Charlotte High School may refer to the following schools in the United States:

- Charlotte High School (Punta Gorda, Florida), Punta Gorda, Florida
- Charlotte High School (Michigan), Charlotte, Michigan
- Charlotte High School (Rochester, New York), Rochester, New York
- Charlotte High School (now Garinger High School), Charlotte, North Carolina
- Charlotte High School (Texas)

== See also ==
- Charlotte Christian School, a private Christian prep school in Charlotte, North Carolina
- Port Charlotte High School, Port Charlotte, Florida
