= Charlott Cordes =

German fashion model

- Born: 6 December 1988 (age 36); Germany
- Modeling information
- Height: 5 ft 9 in (175 cm)
- Hair color: Blonde
- Eye color: Green
- Agency: Model Management (Hamburg), Elite Model Management, Elite Paris, Elite Milan, Select (London, England), and Elite Barcelona

Charlott Cordes (born 6 December 1988) is a German fashion model from Hamburg, Germany. She was co-winner (along with Jeanna Krichel) of the Elite Model Look 2003 in Germany. Cordes placed among the top five at the international final of the contest in Singapore. She was nominated for the German "New Faces Award 2005." In 2004 she modeled in fashion shows for Prada, Jil Sander, and Calvin Klein. She resides in Hamburg, Milan, Italy, New York City, and Barcelona, Spain. Her height is 5 ft 9.5 in (176.5 cm) and she has green eyes.

Cordes has appeared on the cover of the Russian language version of Vogue which was photographed by Karl Lagerfeld in April 2005. The same month she participated in advertising for Chanel. The following August Walter Chin captured her image for the 25th anniversary jubilee issue of German Vogue. Cordes was photographed by Carter Smith for American Teen Vogue and also appeared in Harper's Bazaar. Her advertising campaigns include work for Nivea, DKNY, Laurel, Rena Lange, Moschino, BGN, Fornarina, Tommy Hilfiger, Chanel, Givenchy, DeBeers, and Benetton.

She is represented by Model Management (Hamburg), Elite Model Management, Elite Paris, Elite Milan, Select (London, England), and Elite Barcelona.
