= Charlotte Checkers (disambiguation) =

Charlotte Checkers is an American Hockey League team.

Charlotte Checkers may also refer to:

- Charlotte Checkers (1956–1977), a defunct team in the Eastern Hockey League and Southern Hockey League, 1956–1977
- Charlotte Checkers (1993–2010), a defunct team in the ECHL, 1993–2010

== See also ==
- Checkers (disambiguation)
