= Charlotte (American band) =

American hard rock band

CHARLOTTE
- Origin: Los Angeles, California
- Genres: Heavy metal, hard rock, blues rock
- Years active: 1986-1996, 2009–present
- Label: Eonian Records
- Members: Eric Ganz; Nick DiBacco; Vinnie Cacciotti; Chris Colovas
- Past members: Eric D. Brewton; Rob Thiessen
- Website: www.reverbnation.com/charlotterockband

CHARLOTTE is an American hard rock band that formed in Los Angeles, California in 1986. Currently, they are signed to indie label, Eonian Records, under which they released their debut cd, Medusa Groove, in 2010. Notable Charlotte songs include 'Siren', 'Little Devils', 'Medusa Groove', 'Miss Necrophilia' and 'Ocean Of Love and Mercy'. In 1987, Charlotte started playing on the famed Sunset Strip in Los Angeles, CA. They've played at The Roxy Theatre, The Whisky-a-Go-Go, and most recently The Cat Club in 2010, also on the Strip. They were both a headlining act and support act for the likes of Vixen, Ezo, and XYZ. The rock quintet disbanded in 1996, some members continuing to work in the music business, and reunited in 2009 after the deal with Eonian.

== The early years (1986–1989) ==
Charlotte was formed when vocalist Eric Ganz along with guitarists Vinnie Cacciotti and Nick DiBacco moved to L.A. from upstate N.Y. in late 1986 and met up with bassist Rob Thiessen and drummer Eric Brewton. With this lineup the band took to the stages of The Whisky-a-Go-Go and The Roxy, playing alongside bands such as Warrant and Hollywood glam punk band The Zeros. Eventually the band and Rob parted ways and Chris Colovas stepped in as bass player. Rob would go on to form Canadian rock/metal band Noise Therapy in the '90s. As for Charlotte, their sound evolved into a '70s influenced, bluesy, hard rock sound. Teaming up with producer Mike Wolf (ex-guitarist for King Kobra), Charlotte recorded some of the songs that would, in time, be released on their debut album.

== The 1990s (1990–1996) ==
By 1990 Charlotte was playing the Whisky, The Roxy, and FM Station on a regular basis. They shared the stage with Saraya and Freight Train Jane at the Pomona, CA. National Truck-fest and appeared at The Palace with XYZ (Terry Ilous) and Cry Wolf. They began working with veteran producer Marc DeSisto (Joe Cocker, Melissa Etheridge, U2, Pink Floyd) in creating a sound more reflective of the band's roots; the 1970s rock sound. Gone was the glam image they incorporated when they formed earlier in the '80s. In reviewing one of the band's performances Stephanie Jordan, rock writer for Screamer Magazine, wrote; "Dark, esoteric, and bordering on psychotic, Charlotte proved themselves far above the competition repeatedly throughout their performance...music that actually hurts. Beautiful." Tom Farrell, after being impressed with the band's performance at Hollywood's Red Light District, wrote in Music Connection that Charlotte is 'very unusual' and does not fit into the latest trends. With DeSisto and Mike Wolf producing, the band recorded more songs at various studios in L.A. including Paramount Studios and A & M Studios, both in Hollywood, California, for their forthcoming release, Medusa Groove. However, despite interest from a couple of major labels, the album would not be released during this time. Charlotte would play their last show in 1996. Chris ended up playing bass for Sircle Of Silence, featuring ex-Accept/Bangalore Choir vocalist, David Reece, in the mid-1990s.

== The reunion (2009–present) ==
In 2009 Stephen Craig, executive producer/owner of Eonian Records, contacted Charlotte and a deal was made for the 2010 release of their debut CD, Medusa Groove. The album was officially released April 20, 2010 to favorable reviews. UK rock magazine, Fireworks, says in their 2010 issue No. 40 that Medusa Groove is "..twelve re-mixed kick-ass songs." Lords Of Metal, a webzine out of the Netherlands, gave Medusa Groove Album Of The Month honors shortly after its release and Metalstorm calls the album one of the most eclectic rock albums heard in ages. In November, 2010, with Gary Meadors (Gene Loves Jezebel) on drums, Charlotte reunited for its first show together in almost 15 years, playing The Cat Club on L.A.'s Sunset Strip.

== Band members ==
Current Members

- Eric Ganz - lead vocals (1986-1996, 2009-present)
- Nick DiBacco - guitar, backing vocals (1986-1996, 2009-present)
- Vinnie Cacciotti - guitar (1986-1996, 2009-present)
- Chris Colovas - bass, backing vocals
- Gary Meadors - drums (2010-present)

Former Members

- Eric D. Brewton - drums, backing vocals (1986-1996)
- Rob Thiessen - bass

== Discography ==
- Medusa Groove (2010)
- CHARLOTTE (2022)

== Influences ==
Led Zeppelin, Deep Purple, Guns N' Roses, Faith No More, The Doors, James Brown, Willie Dixon, The Allman Brothers Band, Aerosmith, Jimi Hendrix

== Related subjects ==
Executive Producer: Stephen Craig at Eonian Records; Production: Mike Wolf, Marc DeSisto; A&M Studios; Paramount Studios; Fireworks magazine; Lyrics written by Eric Ganz, Music written by CHARLOTTE
