= Hornet incident =

The Hornet incident was an 1871 diplomatic incident involving Spain, Haiti, and the United States.

In January 1871, during the midst of the Ten Years War between Spain and Cuba, the Hornet (a small steamship flying the flag of the United States) arrived at Port-au-Prince, followed by two Spanish men-of-war. The Hornet was charged with being a pirate, having contraband of war intended for the Cuban insurgents on board. The Spanish asked that the Hornet be given up to them. The United States Minister interposed, stating that the Hornet was a bona fide American steamer. For this reason, Haiti refused to deliver the ship, and remained firm in this decision despite the presence of the Spanish men-of-war in the harbor of Port-Au-Prince and the open threats made by Spain's representatives. On October 5, 1871, the Spanish Consul addressed an ultimatum to the Haitian Secretary of Foreign Affairs, demanding the delivery of the Hornet within 24 hours.

The dispute became threatening for Haiti when the United States decided to relieve the country of all further responsibility in the matter. In consequence, Congress was dispatched to Port-au-Prince, with instructions to convoy the Hornet either to Baltimore or to New York. This steamer eventually left Port-au-Prince in January 1872, which put an end to the controversy between Haiti and Spain.
