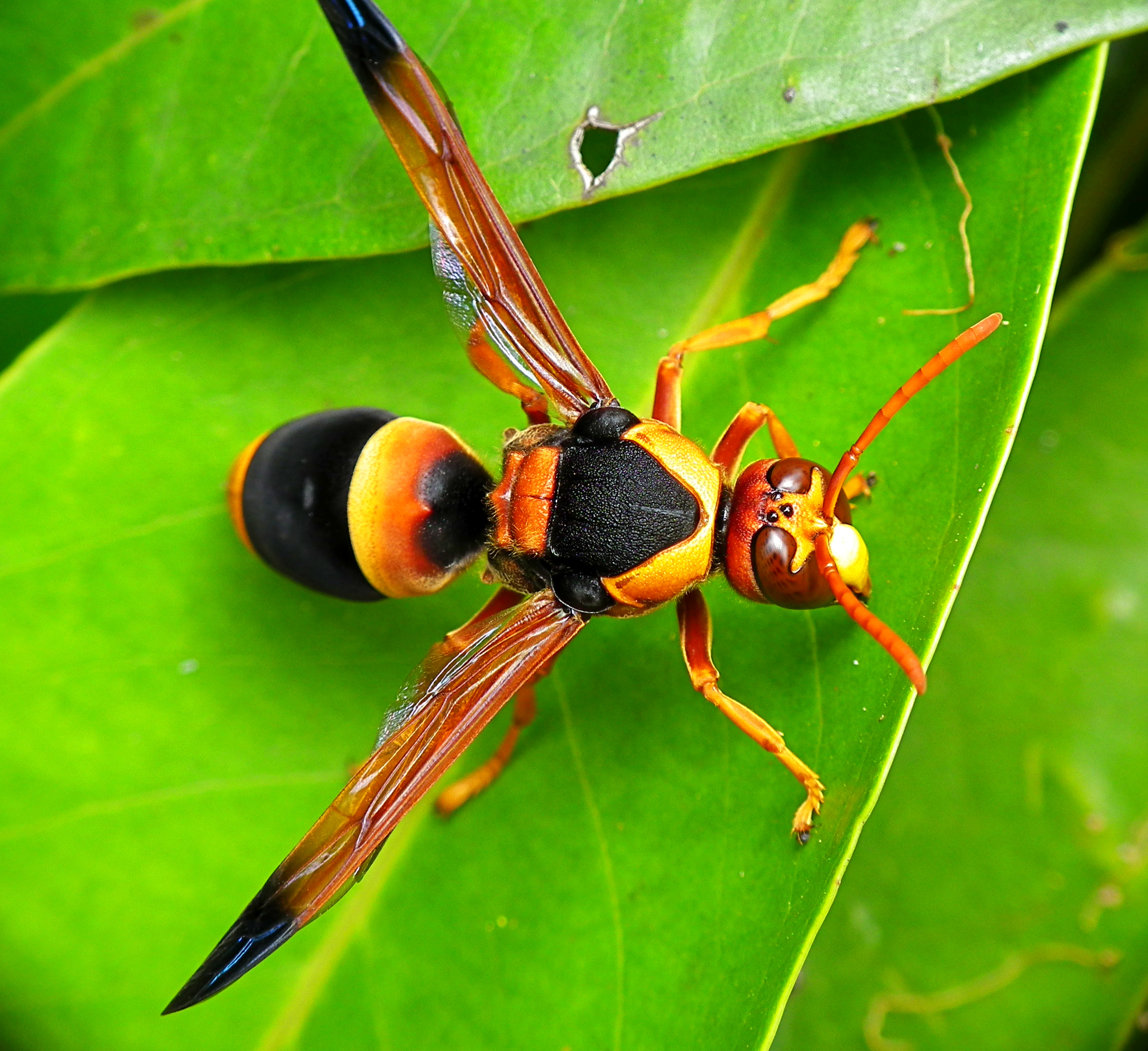

Scientific classification
- Kingdom: Animalia
- Phylum: Arthropoda
- Clade: Pancrustacea
- Class: Insecta
- Order: Hymenoptera
- Family: Vespidae
- Genus: Abispa
- Species: A. ephippium

Binomial name
- Abispa ephippium (Fabricius, 1775)

Synonyms
- Abispa meadewaldoensis Perkins, 1914; Vespa ephippium Fabricius, 1775

= Australian hornet =

Species of wasp

The Australian hornet (Abispa ephippium), a type of potter wasp or "mason wasp", is a vespid native to the Australian states and territories of the Australian Capital Territory, New South Wales, Northern Territory, Victoria, Queensland and Western Australia. Despite its common name, it is not a true hornet.

The Australian hornet is a solitary insect, forming small nests against buildings and other structures. The adult wasp feeds on flower nectar, while the larvae are fed caterpillars captured by the female.

== Description ==
A. ephippium is 30 mm (1.2 in) in length. The insect is mostly orange, with a large central black patch on the top of the thorax, and a wide black band marking the abdomen. The insect's wings are largely translucent, but tinted orange with black areas at the wing's end.

== Life cycle ==
The cycle begins with a single queen wasp emerging in the spring to build a nest and lay eggs. The larvae hatch from the eggs and are fed by the queen and later by worker wasps. The larvae then pupate, and finally emerge as adult wasps. The nest grows throughout the summer, and new queens and males are produced towards the end of the season. Being a member of the potter wasp subfamily (Ecumenical), A. ephippium females build large nests in sheltered positions using mud. The females search for prey (including spiders and caterpillars) around trees and shrubs, before sealing the captured insects inside the nest's cells. The larvae then feed upon these insects, before emerging.
