= Princess Charlotte (1813 ship) =

Merchant ship

History

United States
- Builder: New York
- Launched: 1811, or 1810
- Captured: 1813

United Kingdom
- Name: Princess Charlotte
- Acquired: 1813 by purchase of a prize
- Fate: Wrecked 3 April 1824

General characteristics
- Tons burthen: 330, or 35161/94, or 373 (bm)
- Length: 104 ft 1 in (31.7 m)
- Beam: 28 ft 4 in (8.6 m)
- Armament: 2 × 4-pounder guns

Princess Charlotte was a ship launched in New York in 1810 or 1811 under another name, but captured by the British in 1813. The prize court condemned her on 11 March 1813. Pirie & C. purchased her and renamed her. She then sailed to the West Indies, Central America, and Peru before wrecking on 2 April 1824 off Belize.

== Career ==
Princess Charlotte first appeared in the Register of Shipping (RS) in 1814. It showed her as having been built in New York in 1810. Lloyd's Register (LR) gave the launch year as 1811.

Year	Master	Owner	Trade	Source & notes
1814	Hutchinson	Pirie & Co.	London–Grenada	RS

On 2 May 1815, Princess Charlotte, Hutchinson, master, grounded on the bar at Demerara. It is believed that she would not be got off until the "following Springs". She was refloated on 13 May, after having been lightened, and departed for Barbados.

Year	Master	Owner	Trade	Source & notes
1818	Hutchinson; Lamb	Pirie & Co.	London–Boston; London–Tobago	LR
1820	J.Lamb	Pirie & Co.	Cowes; London-Tobago	LR

On 8 February 1821 Princess Charlotte, Lamb, master, left Belize. She ran on to one of the banks but was expected to get off. She arrived off Dover on 1 April.

Year	Master	Owner	Trade	Source & notes
1824	J.Lamb; P.Lyon	Pirie & Co.	London–Lima; London–Honduras	LR; good repair 1824

== Fate ==
A letter from Honduras dated 2 April 1824 reported that Princess Charlotte, Lyon, master, had been wrecked on the Main Reef, near Tobacco Key (Tobacco Caye, Belize), as she was coming from London. She had bilged and was full of water, but it was hoped that if the weather remained moderate some of her cargo might be saved.

The major source on vessels sailing to India for or by permission of the British East India Company (EIC) lists Princess Charlotte as sailing under a licence from the EIC. However, such a voyages does not appear in Lloyd's List's ship arrival and departure data.
