= Hired armed schooner Princess Charlotte =

There may have been two or possibly three hired armed schooners Princess Charlotte that the Royal Navy took under contract during the Napoleonic Wars.

== First Princess Charlotte ==
The first schooner Princess Charlotte served from 7 July 1804 to 1805. She was of 95 64/94 tons burthen (bm), and carried eight 12-pounder carronades. Her owner was Henshaw Latham and she had a crew of 30 men.

On 18 December 1804, Captain Husband and Princess Charlotte towed the English brig, Golden Grove, G. Pearce, master, into Cowes. Golden Grove had been sailing from Tortola to London when a gale on the 13th tore away all her sails and sprang her top mast. When rescued, Golden Grove had only Pearce and two men to keep the deck. (Lloyd's List reported that a sloop of war had towed Golden Grove, Peace, master, sailing from Demerara to London, into Yarmouth, Isle of Wight.)

== Second Princess Charlotte ==
The second Princess Charlotte may have been the same vessel as the first. The National Maritime Museum database has her name as Princess Charollote and simply notes that she was listed between 1805 and 1806. The database also has a Princess Charlotte and the year 1807. Both of these vessels are described as schooners.

The Naval Chronicle reported that "Captain Wilkins at present commands a small schooner called the Princess Charlotte, mounting six carronades, employed as an hired tender, intended to be attached to the command of Sir Sidney Smith." Henry Wilkins was a civilian, and had until 1801 been master on the hired armed lugger Aristocrat. Wilkins later appears as master on two letters of marque, one from 1806 and one from 1808.

Readily available records do not reveal what happened to Princess Charlotte after the Navy ended her contract.
