= M93 Hornet mine =

American anti-tank mine

The M93 Hornet mine was an American anti-tank mine. It was a wide-area mine, capable of attacking targets up to 100 meters away from its position.

== Development ==
Development of the M93 began in the late 1980s in response to the Warsaw Pact's numerical superiority in armored vehicles over NATO and the Assault Breaker concept to compensate through the use of high-technology standoff weapons.

A development contract was awarded to Honeywell Defense Systems and Textron Inc. in August 1987. In April 1990, Textron was given the contract to complete development of the system.

Following the end of the Cold War and the dissolution of the Soviet Union, the threat to Western Europe by large armored formations was no longer relevant. This, combined with the M93's high unit price of US$119,190 (in 1996 dollars; equivalent to $244,287 in 2025), led to the program's termination in 1997 after just 441 units had been produced.

The US Army later pursued a weapon of a similar design in the XM204 Top-Attack Munition in the early 2020s.

== Description ==
The M93 used both seismic and acoustic sensors to track and identify potential targets near the mine. Once the mine detected a suitable target in range, it turned to face the target and elevated the submunition launcher to the correct angle. The submunition was then fired in the direction of the target using a gas generator. An infrared sensor on the submunition scanned the ground as it traveled, searching for the target. When the target was detected, the submunition triggered a Misnay–Schardin effect warhead that projected a 450-gram tantalum slug, along with a number of smaller fragments, downwards towards the target in a top attack.

== See also ==
- Land mine
- PTKM-1R – similar Russian mine
- XM1100 Scorpion
- M7 Spider
