= Charlotte Hornets (disambiguation) =

The Charlotte Hornets are a National Basketball Association team.

Charlotte Hornets may also refer to:

- Charlotte Hornets (baseball), a minor league baseball team from 1901 to 1973
- Charlotte Hornets (WFL), a World Football League team from 1974 to 1975
