= USS Charlotte =

Four vessels of the United States Navy have been named USS Charlotte, after the city of Charlotte, North Carolina.

- USS Charlotte (1862) was a Confederate schooner captured by Federal forces in 1862 and used until 1867.
- USS Charlotte (CA-12) was the armored cruiser North Carolina renamed in 1920, a year before decommissioning.
- USS Charlotte (PF-60) was a patrol frigate used by the United States Coast Guard during World War II.
- USS Charlotte (SSN-766) is a Los Angeles-class nuclear-attack submarine commissioned in 1994.
