= HMS Charlotte =

Several vessels have served the Royal Navy under the name Charlotte.

- HMY Charlotte, a 143-ton (bm) yacht of 8 guns, built in 1677 at Woolwich Dockyard. She was rebuilt in 1761 and renamed Augusta, then broken up in 1771.
- HMS Charlotte (1763), a cutter of 4 guns purchased in February 1763. She was sold on 14 November 1770.
- HMS Charlotte (1797) was a brig of eight guns purchased in the Leeward Islands that wrecked on Hispaniola on 21 December 1797, within four months of her purchase. Because she wrecked so quickly, she was never entered into Admiralty records. All her crew made it to shore on her fallen masts. There the Spaniards took them prisoner and marched them to Santiago. Her commander was Lieutenant John Thicknesse.
- HMS Charlotte (1798) was an eight-gun schooner purchased in the Leeward Islands in 1797 that a French privateer captured in October 1798 while she was under the command of Lieutenant Thicknesse.
- HMS Charlotte (1800) was a schooner purchased in 1800. She was armed with six 3-pounder guns and wrecked on 28 March 1801 on the Île à Vache while under the command of Lieutenant John Williams, Thicknesse's predecessor on the previous Charlotte.
- RMAS Charlotte (1966, A210) was a Girl-class dockyard tug, built by Isaac Pimblott at Northwich. She was sold in 1989.

The Royal Navy employed several hired armed cutters named Charlotte.

== See also ==
- HMS Queen Charlotte, several ships
- Hired armed schooner Lady Charlotte
