= Princess Charlotte (1819 brig) =

Ship lost between Hobart and Sydney in Australia

History

United Kingdom
- Name: Princess Charlotte
- Builder: Fortesco de Santos, Newcastle, New South Wales
- Launched: 19 September 1819
- Fate: Disappeared after 27 September 1820

General characteristics
- Type: Brig
- Displacement: 60 tons
- Propulsion: Sail

Princess Charlotte was a 60-ton brig launched in 1819 that disappeared in 1820 on a voyage between Hobart Town and Sydney.

The Government constructed Princess Charlotte in 1819, at Newcastle, New South Wales. She was primarily used for transport and conveying cargo up and down the colony's east coast. On 27 July 1820, she conveyed 33 convicts (five female and 28 male) from Sydney to the penal punishment station at Newcastle. returning with coal and timber harvested along the Hunter Rover.

She left Hobart Town on 27 September 1820, for Sydney with crew and passengers and a cargo of wheat. The passengers included four soldiers from the 48th Regiment and at least three convicts. The captain was Edward Devine. She was not heard from again.
