= Queen Charlotte (disambiguation) =

Queen Charlotte (1744–1818) was the queen consort of the United Kingdom as the wife of George III.

Queen Charlotte may also refer to:

== People ==
- Charlotte of Bourbon, Queen of Cyprus (1388–1422), queen consort of Cyprus
- Charlotte of Savoy (c. 1442 – 1483), queen consort of France
- Charlotte of Cyprus (1444–1487; r. 1458–1464), queen regnant of Cyprus
- Hedvig Elisabeth Charlotte of Holstein-Gottorp (1759–1818), queen consort of Sweden and Norway
- Charlotte, Princess Royal (1766–1828), queen consort of Württemberg
- Sālote Lupepauʻu (1811–1889), queen consort of Tonga
- Charlotte of Schaumburg-Lippe (1864–1946), queen consort of Württemberg
- Sālote Tupou III (1900–1965; r. 1918–1965), queen regnant of Tonga

== Places ==
=== Canada ===
- Daajing Giids, British Columbia, Canada, formerly known as Queen Charlotte City
  - Gidgalang Kuuyas Naay Secondary School (formerly Queen Charlotte Secondary), a high school in Daajing Giids
- Haida Gwaii, an archipelago in British Columbia, Canada also known as the Queen Charlotte Islands
- Queen Charlotte Channel, British Columbia, Canada
- Queen Charlotte Sound (Canada), a sound in British Columbia

=== Elsewhere ===
- Queen Charlotte Sound / Tōtaranui, Marlborough District, New Zealand
- Queen Charlotte, Virginia, United States

== Other uses ==
- Queen Charlotte (ship), various ships
- Queen Charlotte: A Bridgerton Story, a limited Netflix series
  - Queen Charlotte: A Bridgerton Story (soundtrack)
- Queen Charlotte's Ball, London

== See also ==
- Charlotte Amalie of Hesse-Kassel (1650–1714), queen consort of Denmark and Norway
- Carlota Joaquina of Spain (1775–1830), queen consort of Portugal
- Charlotte of Belgium (1840–1927), empress consort of Mexico
- Princess Charlotte (disambiguation)
- Queen Charlotte Sound (disambiguation)
- Queen Charlotte Fault
- Queen Charlotte Islands caribou
- Queen Charlotte Track
- Queen Charlotte's and Chelsea Hospital
