= Lotts Creek Township =

Lotts Creek Township may refer to the following townships in the United States:

- Lotts Creek Township, Kossuth County, Iowa
- Lotts Creek Township, Ringgold County, Iowa

== See also ==
- Lotts Creek
- Lotts (disambiguation)
