= Lott (disambiguation) =

Lott is a surname and given name.

Lott or LOTT or similar, may also refer to:

== Places ==
- Lott, Texas, USA; a city in Falls County
  - Rosebud-Lott Independent School District, Travis, Falls County, Texas, USA
    - Rosebud-Lott High School, Travis, Falls County, Texas, USA
- Dell Lott Hollow, Fishlake National Forest, Pavant Range, Sevier County, Utah, USA
- Trent Lott International Airport, Moss Point, Mississippi, USA
- Lott Cemetery, Waycross, Georgia, USA
- Howard L. and Vivian W. Lott House, Mineola, Wood County, Texas, USA
- Hendrick I. Lott House, Marine Park, Brooklyn, New York City, New York State, USA
- Willy Lott's Cottage, Flatford, East Bergholt, Suffolk, England, UK

== Other uses ==
- Law of total tricks (LoTT) in contract bridge
- The Lott, Australian lottery brand
- Lott Trophy, college football trophy
- Trent Lott Center for Economic Development, University of Southern Mississippi
- Libs of TikTok, far-right anti-LGBT Twitter account

== See also ==
- .458 Lott rifle cartridge
- Bounds Lott, Wicomico County, Maryland, USA
- Hayward's Lott (Ivy Hall), Pocomoke City, Somerset County, Maryland, USA
- Lotta (disambiguation)
- Lotts (disambiguation)
- Lotty (name)
- Lotti (name)
- Lottie (disambiguation)
- Lotte (disambiguation)
- Lot (disambiguation)
