= Lotts =

Lotts may refer to:

- Megan Lotts, U.S. librarian
- Quantel Lotts (born 1986) U.S. convict
- The Lotts (formerly: Stables To Cavens House), Kirkbean, Dumfries and Galloway, Scotland, UK; see List of listed buildings in Kirkbean, Dumfries and Galloway

== See also ==
- Lotta (disambiguation)
- Lotts Creek (disambiguation)
- Lotts Creek Township (disambiguation)
- North Lotts, Docklands Strategic Development Zone, Dublin, Ireland
- South Lotts, Dublin, Ireland
- Lott (disambiguation)
- LOTS (disambiguation)
- Lot (disambiguation)
