= Lotts Creek =

Lotts Creek may refer to the following streams in the United States:

- Lotts Creek (East Fork Grand River tributary) in Iowa and Missouri
- Lotts Creek (Kentucky) in Kentucky

Lotts Creek may refer to the following townships in the United States:

- Lotts Creek Township, Kossuth County, Iowa, Kossuth County, Iowa
- Lotts Creek Township, Ringgold County, Iowa, Ringgold County, Iowa

== See also ==
- Lotts (disambiguation)
