= Lot (name) =

Lot is a rare given name, taken from the biblical figure. People with the name include:

- Lot Abu Hassan (born 1984), Malaysian footballer
- Lot Chiwunga (born 1986), Zimbabwean footballer
- Lot Clark (1788–1862), American politician
- Lot Diffey (1877–1952), Australian politician
- Lot Flannery (1836–1922), American sculptor
- Lot Hall (1757–1809), American politician and judge
- Lot Jones (1882–1941), Welsh footballer
- Lot Kapuāiwa, birthname of Kamehameha V (1830–1872), King of Hawaii
- Lot Lane (1864–1953), Hawaiian insurgent
- Lot M. Morrill (1813–1883), American politician
- Lot Norton (1803–1880), American politician
- Lot Smith (1830–1892), Mormon pioneer
- Lot Thomas (1843–1905), American politician and judge
- Lot Torelli (1835–1896), Italian sculptor
- Lot Whitcomb (1807–1857), American businessman and politician
- Lot (monk), Egyptian Christian monk who lived around the 4th and 5th centuries

== See also ==
- Lot (disambiguation)
- Lot (surname)
- Lota (name)
