= Lotte =

Lotte may refer to:

== Businesses ==
- Lotte Corporation, a South Korean industrial conglomerate
  - Lotte Capital, a South Korean financial company
  - Lotte Card, a South Korean credit card provider
  - Lotte Chilsung, a South Korean manufacturer of food products
  - Lotte Cinema, a chain of movie theatres in South Korea
  - Lotte Confectionery, a South Korean confectionery
  - Lotte Department Store, a South Korean department store
  - Lotte Liquor, a South Korean distiller
  - Lotte World, a recreation complex in Seoul, South Korea
- Lotte Holdings, a Japanese holding company
- Lotte Tour Development, a South Korean tourism company

== Entertainment ==
- Lotte (film), a 1928 German silent film directed by Carl Froelich
- Lotte in Weimar, a 1975 East German drama film directed by Egon Günther
- Lotte (TV series), a Dutch TV series based on the Colombian telenovela Betty, la fea
- Lotte, the title character of a series of Estonian animated TV programs and films, including:
  - Lotte from Gadgetville, a 2006 film
  - Lotte and the Moonstone Secret, a 2011 film

== Cities ==
- Lotte, Germany, a municipality in North Rhine-Westphalia

== People ==
- Lotte (name), a feminine given name

== Sport ==
- Chiba Lotte Marines, a baseball team in Chiba City, Japan
- Lotte Giants, a baseball team in Busan, South Korea
- Sportfreunde Lotte, an association football club in Lotte, Germany

== Fictional characters ==
- Lotte, the object of Werther's affection in Goethe's The Sorrows of Young Werther
- Lotte Körner (Lottie Horn in the English translation), a nine-year-old girl, one of the protagonists of Erich Kästner's novel Lottie and Lisa
- Lotte (Estonian literature), the main character in Estonian children book series and animated films
- Charlotte Buff (Lotte), the main character in Thomas Mann's 1939 novel, Lotte in Weimar: The Beloved Returns
- Lotte Jansson, a main character in Little Witch Academia
- Lotte Schwartz, character in Being John Malkovich
- Lotte Weeda, a character in the eponymously titled 2004 novel by Dutch author Maarten 't Hart

== Buildings ==
- Lotte Center Hanoi
- Lotte New York Palace Hotel
- Lotte Shopping Avenue (a shopping centre that is part of the Ciputra World Jakarta complex in Jakarta, Indonesia)
- Lotte World Tower

== See also ==
- Lot (disambiguation)
- Lott (disambiguation)
- Lotta (disambiguation)
- Lottie (disambiguation)
- Lotty, a given name
