= Senator Lott (disambiguation) =

Trent Lott (born 1941) was a U.S. Senator from Mississippi from 1989 to 2007.

Senator Lott may also refer to:

- Elisha Everett Lott (1820–1864), Texas State Senate
- Hiram R. Lott (1829–1895), Louisiana State Senate
- John A. Lott (1806–1878), New York State Senate

== See also ==
- Lott (disambiguation)
