= Joseph, Utah =

Town in the state of Utah, United States

- Town
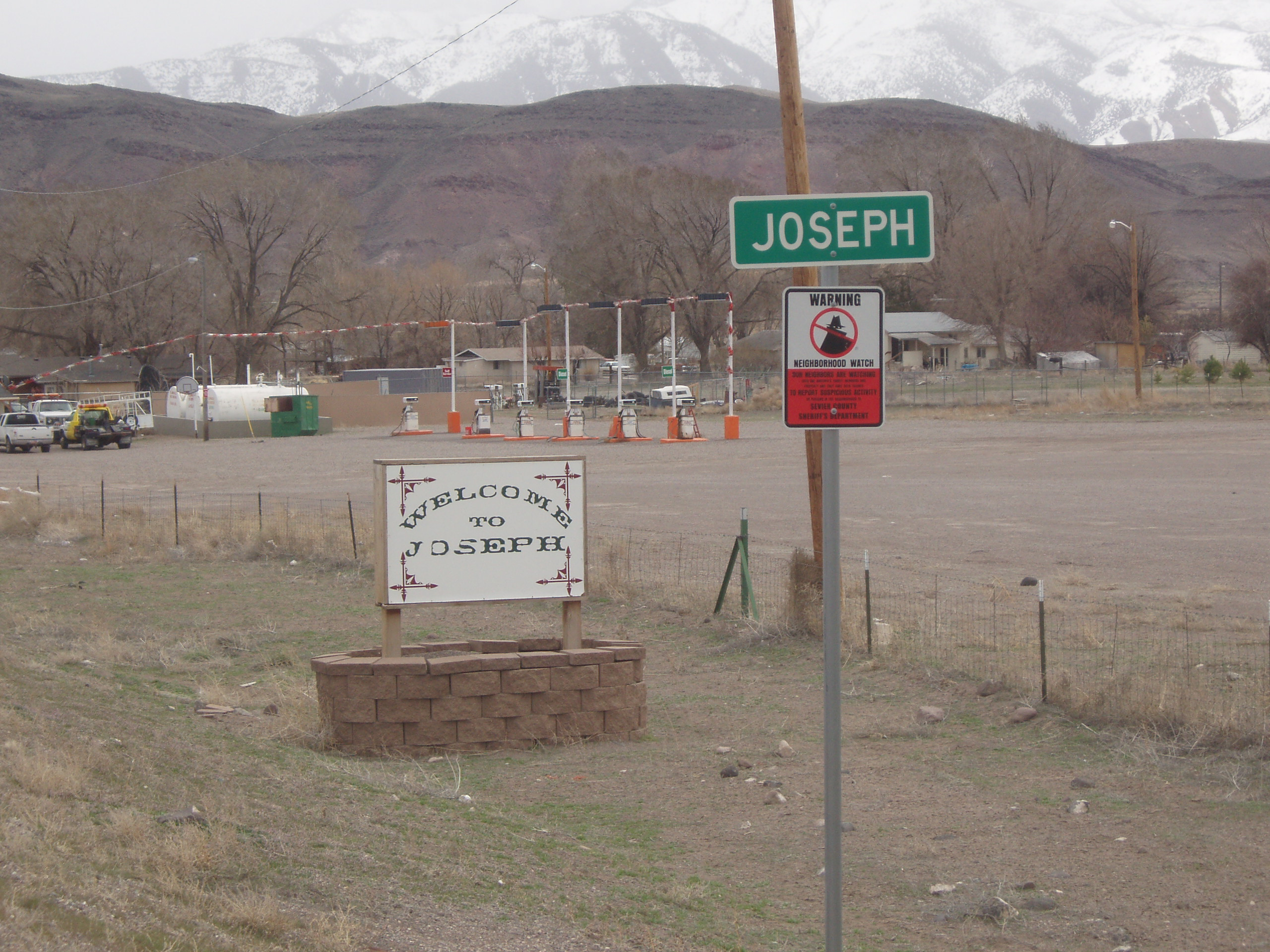
- Joseph welcome sign, April 2010

- Location in Sevier County and the state of Utah.
- Coordinates: 38°37′36″N 112°13′2″W
- Country: United States
- State: Utah
- County: Sevier
- Settled: 1871
- Incorporated: 1900
- Named for: Joseph Angell Young

Area
  - Total: 0.87 sq mi (2.25 km^{2})
  - Land: 0.87 sq mi (2.25 km^{2})
  - Water: 0 sq mi (0.00 km^{2})
- Elevation: 5,436 ft (1,657 m)

Population (2020)
  - Total: 288
  - Density: 412.0/sq mi (159.07/km^{2})
- Time zone: UTC-7 (Mountain (MST))
  - Summer (DST): UTC-6 (MDT)
- ZIP code: 84739
- Area code: 435
- FIPS code: 49-39370
- GNIS feature ID: 1442224
- Website: josephtownutah.gov

Joseph is a town in Sevier County, Utah, United States. The population was 288 at the 2020 census. The town was named for Joseph Angell Young, an apostle of the Church of Jesus Christ of Latter-day Saints. Joseph was settled in 1871.

== Geography ==
According to the United States Census Bureau, the town has a total area of 0.9 square miles (2.3 km^{2}), all land.

Graveyard Hollow is located within the town, and Dell Lott Hollow is located nearby.

== Demographics ==
Historical population
Census	Pop.	Note	%±
1880	370		—
1890	436		17.8%
1900	626		43.6%
1910	127		−79.7%
1920	224		76.4%
1930	243		8.5%
1940	297		22.2%
1950	208		−30.0%
1960	117		−43.7%
1970	125		6.8%
1980	217		73.6%
1990	198		−8.8%
2000	269		35.9%
2010	344		27.9%
2020	288		−16.3%
U.S. Decennial Census

As of the census of 2000, there were 269 people, 92 households, and 73 families residing in the town. The population density was 301.7 people per square mile (116.7/km^{2}). There were 109 housing units at an average density of 122.3 per square mile (47.3/km^{2}). The racial makeup of the town was 94.05% White, 0.74% African American, 0.37% Asian, 2.97% from other races, and 1.86% from two or more races. Hispanic or Latino of any race were 6.69% of the population.

There were 92 households, out of which 30.4% had children under the age of 18 living with them, 69.6% were married couples living together, 7.6% had a female householder with no husband present, and 19.6% were non-families. 16.3% of all households were made up of individuals, and 5.4% had someone living alone who was 65 years of age or older. The average household size was 2.92 and the average family size was 3.31.

In the town, the population was spread out, with 30.5% under the age of 18, 10.4% from 18 to 24, 22.7% from 25 to 44, 23.4% from 45 to 64, and 13.0% who were 65 years of age or older. The median age was 36 years. For every 100 females, there were 96.4 males. For every 100 females age 18 and over, there were 103.3 males.

The median income for a household in the town was $29,375, and the median income for a family was $33,125. Males had a median income of $36,563 versus $17,500 for females. The per capita income for the town was $12,456. About 17.4% of families and 21.7% of the population were below the poverty line, including 30.9% of those under the age of eighteen and 25.0% of those 65 or over.

== See also ==
- List of cities and towns in Utah
