= Villa Gernetto, Lesmo =

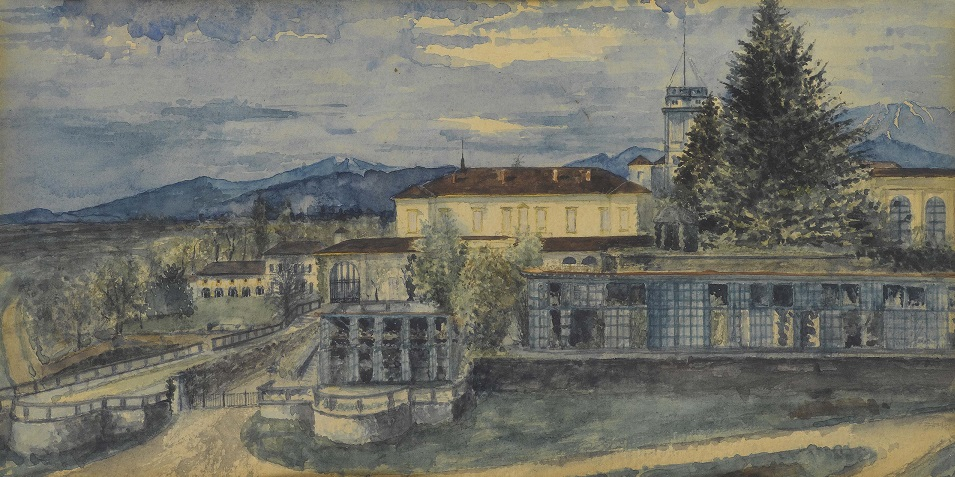

The Villa Gernetto is a rural palace located near the town of Lesmo, in the Province of Monza and Brianza, in the Region of Lombardy, Italy.

The villa, also known as Molinari, Mellerio, or Somaglia after various owners or an architect respectively. The property initially belonged to the family of the Count Rozzoni from Milan; after the 15th-century it passed through the Molinari to the Mellerio family. Under the Molinari, the villa was rebuilt in its present form. The Gardens date to the 1815–1816. In the 19th century, the Count Somaglia designed the courtyard, the chapel, and some of the funeral monuments on the site, including by sculptors Canova and Fabris. One of the memorials recalls Giovannina Mellorio, who died at age 17. At one time the Somaglia family held a grand art collection.

In recent years, the villa has been notable for being owned by Silvio Berlusconi.
