= LOTS =

LOTS may refer to:

- LOTS (personality psychology), an acronym providing a broad classification of data source for personality psychology assessment
- London Omnibus Traction Society, a bus society
- Legend of the Seeker, a television series based on novels in the Sword of Truth series by Terry Goodkind
- Legends of the Superheroes, a 1979 television series based on DC Comics characters.
- Lucifer on the Sofa, a 2022 album by American rock band Spoon
- A linearly ordered topological space.

== See also ==
- Lot (disambiguation)
- Lotts (disambiguation)
