= Noelani Arista =

American university teacher

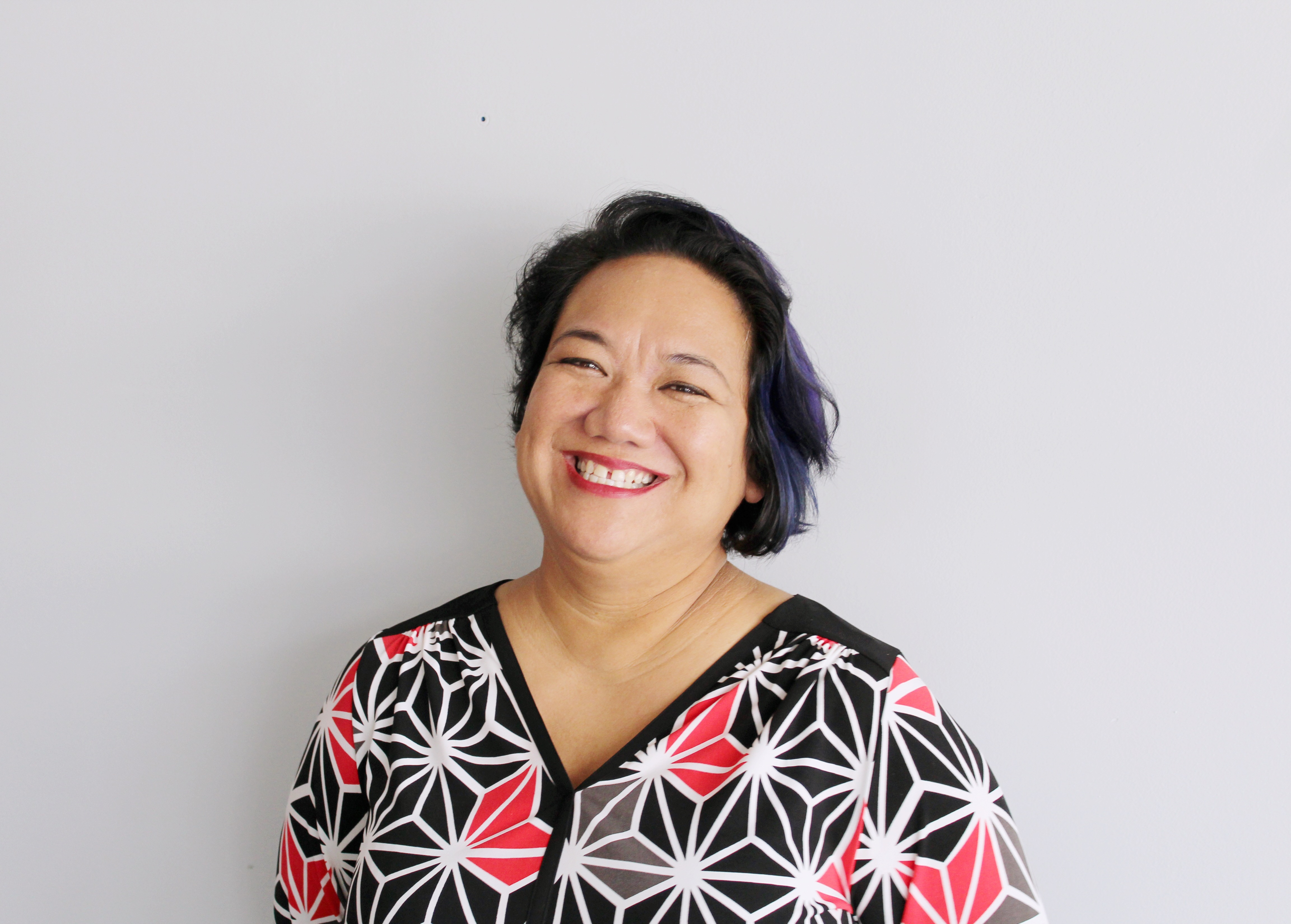
Noelani Arista

Denise Noelani Manuela Arista is an associate professor of Hawaiian and U.S. History in the Department of History and Classical Studies at McGill University, where she is the Director of the Indigenous Studies Program and the Institute for Indigenous Research and Knowledges. Her scholarship focuses on 19th century American history, Hawaiian history and literature, Indigenous epistemology and translation, and colonial and Indigenous history and historiography.

== Early life and education ==
Arista was born and raised in Honolulu, Hawaiʻi and she graduated from the Kamehameha Schools in 1986. She received both her BA (1992) and her MA (1998) in Hawaiian Religion from the Department of Religion at the University of Hawai'i at Mānoa. In 2010, she earned her PhD from the Department of History at Brandeis University. Arista's dissertation, “Histories of Unequal Measure: Euro-American Encounters With Hawaiian Governance and Law, 1793-1827,” won the 2010 Allan Nevins Prize from the Society of American Historians for the "best-written doctoral dissertation on a significant subject in American history".

Arista's education includes mentorship and training through Hawaiian kumu (teachers) Aunty Edith McKinzie, Rubellite Kawena Johnson, Kalani Akana, Manu Haokalani Gay, Pomaka'i Gaui, and John Keolamaka'ainanakalahuiokalaninokamehamehaʻekolu Lake.

== Academic career ==
Arista was hired as an assistant professor in the Department of History at the University of Hawai'i at Mānoa in 2008. In 2013-14, Arista was a post-doctoral fellow in the Department of English at the University of Pennsylvania. In 2018, Arista was promoted to associate professor of Hawaiian History at the University of Hawai'i.

=== Research and publications ===
Arista's research focuses on Hawaiian governance and customary law, as well as the rules and pedagogies which structure the passing on of traditional Hawaiian knowledge. While drawing attention to the breadth of Hawaiian language textual archives, Arista's work suggests methods for how to approach the complexity of Hawaiian language by recognizing and assembling important patterns of Hawaiian discourse. Arista has also written about traditional Hawaiian mele (chants), and Hawaiian film, art and artists.

Arista's current research examines the cultural, legal, and political colonization of the Hawaiian islands. She has published on prostitution in 19th century Hawai'i, the arrival of James Cook to the Hawaiian islands, the appropriation of Hawaiian culture, the recording and transmission of Hawaiian history, and early Hawaiian publications and historians. She is a leading expert on Hawaiian historian and chiefly counsellor David Malo and is immersed within the community of Hawaiian scholars.

Under the auspices of the University of Hawaiʻi Committee for the Preservation and Study of Hawaiian Language, Art, and Culture, Arista is a member of a team of University of Hawaiʻi researchers currently working to collect, understand, interpret, and translate mele Kanikau, Hawaiian grief chants and laments that were published in 19th century Hawaiian-language newspapers.

Arista's first book, The Kingdom and the Republic: Sovereign Hawai'i and the Early United States, relates the experience of native Hawaiian encounters with colonialism during the early- to mid-nineteenth century. It was published by the University of Pennsylvania Press in 2018.

=== Public-facing scholarship ===
In 2015, Arista created the Facebook group 365 Days of Aloha to promote the well being of kanaka māoli (native Hawaiian). Daily posts were curated to expand public knowledge of 'aloha' beyond the tropes promoted by popular consumerist culture which simplify the term as a translation of 'hello', 'goodbye', and 'I love you'. The daily entries grew to incorporate original translations of popular Hawaiian mele (songs,) oli (chants), and ʻōlelo noʻeau (proverbs) from the Hawaiian language into English. This work, along with accompanying photographs, music, and videos, aims to be a bulwark against the inaccurate representations of Hawaiian culture in popular media.

While much of Arista's work has focused on the early nineteenth-century movement of aural-oral moʻolelo, authoritative speech, and performative literature into written and published text, she has recently shifted to the perpetuation and persistence of Hawaiian knowledge into digital media. As a public intellectual and digital humanist, she has argued at conferences and presentations that the work of creating new modes of engagement with Hawaiian knowledge needs to be shaped by those trained in customary and traditional knowledge and language, and not entrusted solely to engineers, coders and computer scientists who may have not been trained to a deep foundation in tradition. As such, Arista is a knowledge-keeper and contributor to “He Au Hou 1 & 2” ("A New World"), two Hawaiian-language video games that were produced in 2017 & 2018 through a joint collaboration between Initiative for Indigenous Futures and Kanaeokana.

Arista appeared on an episode of Matt Gilbertson's Design Talk Hawaii podcast and collaborated on the award-winning "Making Kin with the Machines". Arista also makes regular appearances at community events in Honolulu, writes about the experience of the increased touristification of Hawai'i, and is a strategic consultant for Mana Up, a Hawaii-based organization that supports Hawai'i-based products and companies.
