= Lott =

Lott as a surname or given name may refer to:

== Surname ==
- Lott (surname)

== Given name ==
- Lott Cary (1780–1828), African-American Baptist minister and lay physician, instrumental in the founding of the Colony of Liberia
- Lott R. Herrick (1871–1937), American jurist
- Lott Warren (1797–1861), United States Representative from Georgia

== Fictional characters ==
- Ivor Lott, a character from the British comic strip Ivor Lott and Tony Broke

== See also ==
- Lot (disambiguation)
- Lotti (given name)
- Lotty
