= George Lycurgus =

Greek American businessman (1858–1960)

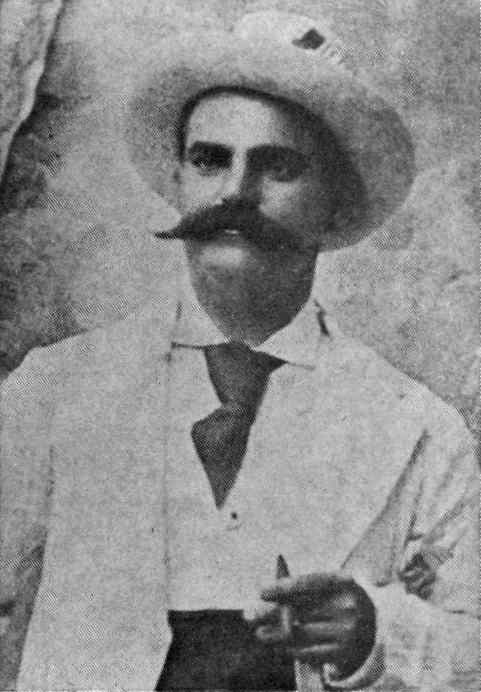
- c. 1892
- Born: 1858; Vasara, Kingdom of Greece
- Died: 6 August 1960 (aged 101); Hilo, Hawaii
- Occupation: Businessman
- Spouse: Athina Gerassimos
- Children: Antigoni, Leo, Nicholas

George Lycurgus (Greek: Γεώργιος Λυκούργος) (1858–1960) was a Greek American businessman who played an influential role in the early tourist industry of Hawaii. After Queen Liliʻuokalani was overthrown in a coup by the Committee of Safety, he ran afoul of the government of the Republic of Hawaii and was accused of treason. Later he was instrumental in the development of the Hawaiian Volcano Observatory and Hawaiʻi Volcanoes National Park.

== Early life ==
He was born in 1858 in Vassaras (near Sparta, Greece). After his release from the Greek Army, his father decided to leave the family farm to an older brother and agreed to send George to America to join his eldest brother John, in California. In 1877 he traveled in steerage class to New York City, and worked his way across the country. A relative convinced him to join a wholesale fruit business trading between Hawaii and California in 1881. In San Francisco he shipped California produce and wine to his cousin in Honolulu, who shipped Hawaiian bananas to the mainland. Through friends he learned of a small oyster house that was for sale in Sausalito and he was able to buy it. He named it the Oyster Grotto. By 1881, the Grotto came to be patronized by such notables as William Randolph Hearst and the sons of the sugar cane baron, Claus Spreckels. He became friends with the sons of Claus Spreckels, whose family owned the Oceanic Steamship Company and a sugar cane business in Hawaii. In 1889 he was supervising shipment being loaded at the docks, when some of the Spreckels family invited him on board for a poker game. By the time he noticed, the ship was on its way across the Pacific. He spent only a week in Hawaii, but must have enjoyed the stay, since he took more trips and spent more time on the islands.

In 1892 he sent for his nephew Demosthenes Lycurgus, who would help him manage his Hawaiian enterprises. Along with other recent immigrants, he formed the Pearl City Fruit Company. Their competition was the Hawaiian Fruit and Packing Company, owned by established descendants of American missionaries such as Lorrin A. Thurston, who was also a powerful politician. Eventually he would sell his restaurant in San Francisco and move to the islands.

== Political miscalculation ==
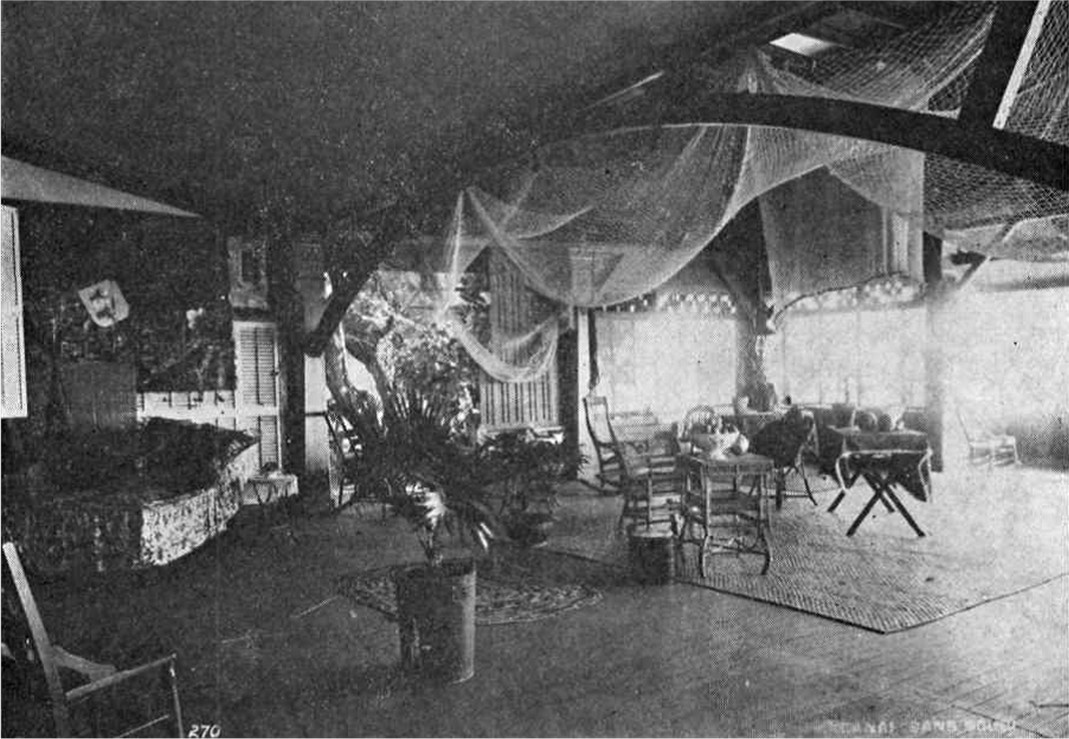
Sans Souci Hotel circa 1893

Lycurgus leased the small guest house of Allen Herbert in 1893 on Waikīkī beach in Honolulu. He expanded it and renamed it the "Sans Souci" (French for "without care") for the Sanssouci Palace in Potsdam. It became one of the first beach resorts and the area at coordinates 21°15′49″N 157°49′17″W is still called "Sans Souci Beach". Celebrities such as Robert Louis Stevenson stayed there on his second trip later that year, and it became a popular destination for tourists from the mainland.

In 1894 Lycurgus made his first trip to the Kīlauea volcano with Admiral Royal R. Ingersoll, sailing to Hilo aboard the USS Philadelphia. The volcano impressed him and he took note of the future possible business opportunities.

A friendship had evolved between Lycurgus and the Hawaiian royal Kalākaua family, who were regulars at his resorts. This earned him the nickname "Duke of Sparta", a title borne by the Crown Prince of Greece. Despite being a commoner, he felt more comfortable with monarchy than the Americans.

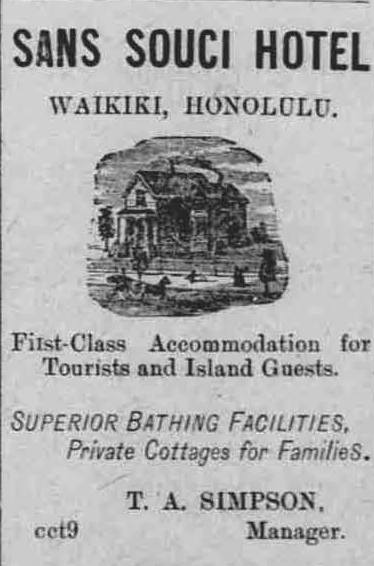
An 1893 advertisement that appeared in the Hawaii Holomua

In 1893, after the death of Kalākaua, Thurston and other Americans led the overthrow of the Kingdom of Hawaii and declared a Republic of Hawaii, hoping to join the United States of America. The new government, controlled by conservative missionaries, fined Lycurgus for selling liquor at his resort. Lycurgus hired a band of Hawaiians who played music honoring Queen Liliʻuokalani instead of "The Star-Spangled Banner".

After the failed 1895 counter-revolution, he was accused of smuggling guns to the Royalists. Several leaders had meetings in the Sans Souci hotel. By January 20 the leaders were all captured. Lycurgus was arrested, charged with treason, spent 52 days in jail, but was never tried.

By 1898, the Spanish–American War had increased American interest in the Pacific. He entertained press correspondents on their way to the Philippines at his Sans Souci hotel. Hawaii was annexed as a territory of the United States that year and the practical Lycurgus applied for American citizenship.

He opened a restaurant called the Union Grill in Honolulu in 1901 and would hold "Jailbirds of 1895" nights which were not popular with the new government. He phased out of the politics of Honolulu over the next few years. Lycurgus invested in a logging venture in 1907, and bought the Hilo Hotel from John D. Spreckels in 1908.

In 1903, when he returned to Greece to visit his mother, he met and married Athina Gerassimos from Sparta, the second of nine children. She was probably the first Greek woman in Hawaii.

== Volcano House ==
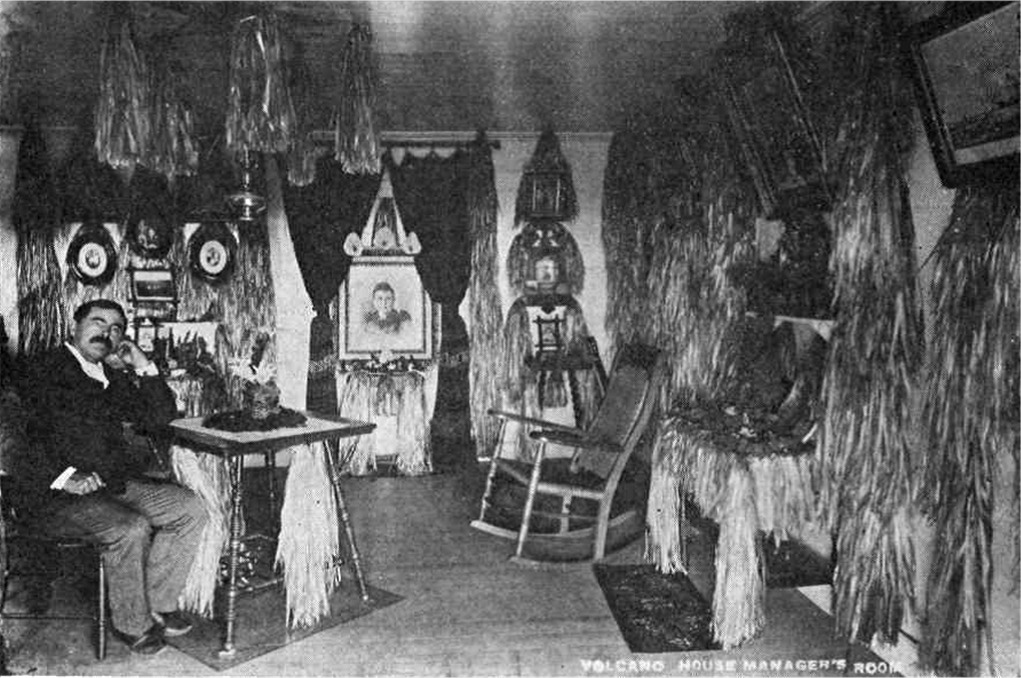
Demosthenes Lycurgus in Volcano House, 1908

In December 1904, George and Demosthenes Lycurgus became principal stockholders of the Volcano House Company and took over the management of the Volcano House hotel on the more remote Big Island of Hawaii. His nephew Demosthenes always introduced him as "Uncle George" to the guests, which earned him his new nickname.

Kīlauea had been inactive for almost a year, but Lycurgus had other enterprises to keep himself afloat. Two months after the Lycurguses acquired the business, the volcano erupted.

He eventually made peace with Lorrin Thurston, who worked with him for ten years, starting in 1906, to have the volcano area made into Hawaiʻi Volcanoes National Park. However, the Lycurgus family kept a shrine to deposed Queen Liliʻuokalani at the Volcano House and related the legends of Ancient Hawaii to the visitors. Prayers were made to the fire goddess Pele, said to live in Kīlauea, to provide spectacular eruptions. They were better for business.

In January 1912, geologist Thomas Jaggar arrived to investigate the volcano. The Lycurgus family raised money to build a small building next to the hotel for scientific instruments. By February 1912 construction was begun on the Hawaiian Volcano Observatory. Jaggar resided there the next 28 years, often giving scientific talks to guests at the hotel.

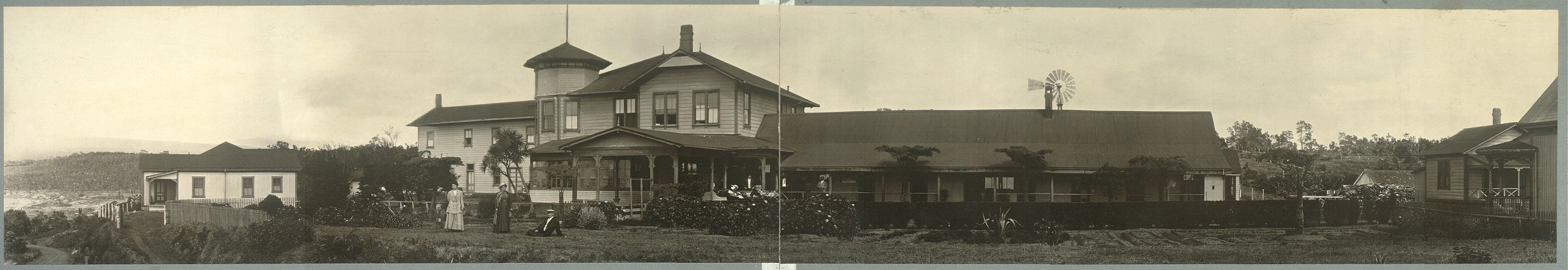
The Volcano House hotel c. 1912

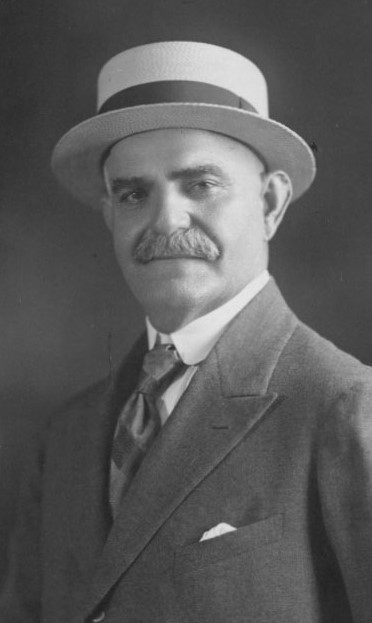
George Lycurgus

While visiting Greece in 1914, World War I prevented him from returning. In 1919, Demosthenes Lycurgus traveled to Athens to marry Maria Yatrakos, but died of influenza within a week of his wedding in the 1918 flu pandemic. Finally George was able to return to Hawaii in 1920 with his sister-in-law Poppy Detor.

In 1921 George Lycurgus sold the Volcano House and moved to Hilo, Hawaii. The Inter-Island Steam Navigation Company bought the property and invested $150,000 into expanding it.

In 1932 during the Great Depression the Inter-Island Steam Navigation Company was going bankrupt after expanding the Volcano House to 115 rooms. Lycurgus bought it back for $300 in a receivership sale, but very few guests showed up until an eruption in 1934. He started the tradition of tossing gin bottles into the volcano, a practice certainly not approved by park officials.

In 1937 his wife Athena died of cancer in Hilo. A fire destroyed the hotel in 1940, ironically from a kitchen oil burner, not volcanic lava. Only a few artifacts, such as a koa wood piano were saved. Embers from the fire were taken to the 1877 Volcano House building to claim the fireplace had burned continuously. The old structure was used again for guests; it now houses the Volcano Art Center.

At the age of 81, he traveled to Washington, D.C., and convinced influential friends, many of whom (including Franklin D. Roosevelt) had stayed in the Volcano House, to assign the Civilian Conservation Corps to construct a park headquarters building farther back from the cliff. That allowed him to build a more modern hotel at the former Hawaiian Volcano Observatory site. He reopened the new Volcano House (designed by Charles William Dickey) by November 1941.

After another eruption in 1952, at the age of 93, he arranged a publicity stunt involving riding a horse to the rim of the erupting vent and tossing in his ceremonial bottle of gin. Despite the efforts of park officials, the event went off as planned, pleasing the spectators and the press. The Volcano House was renovated and expanded again in 1953. He died on August 6, 1960, at the age of 101, reportedly the oldest man in Hawaii.

== Biography ==
Blickhahn, Harry Miller (1961). Uncle George of Kilauea: The Story of George Lycurgus. Volcano House. OCLC 6254797.
