= John C. Lane =

American politician (1872–1958)

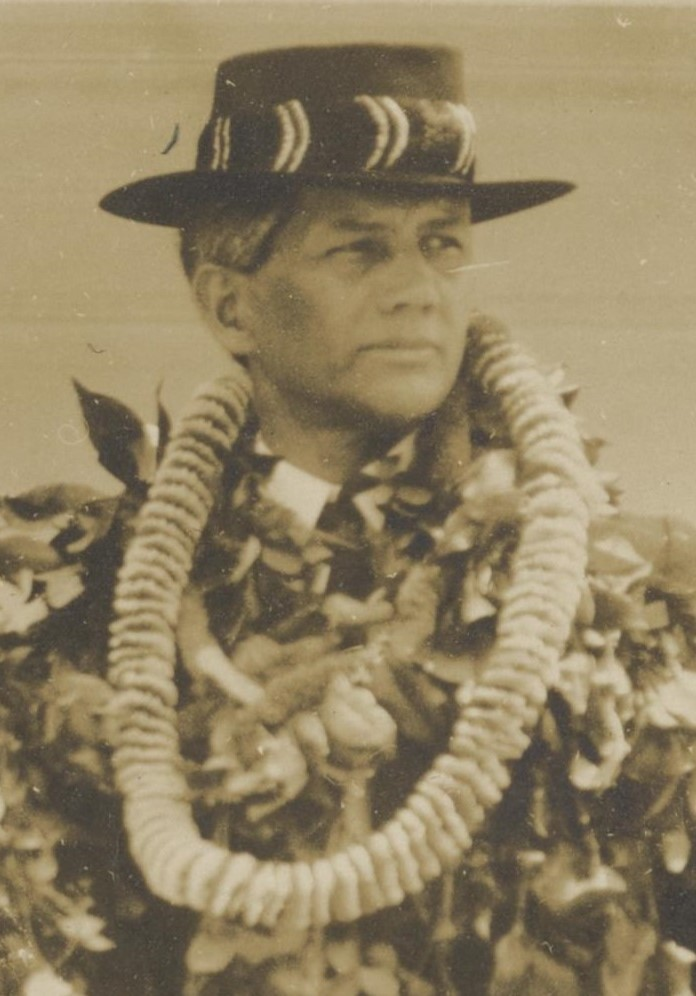
- John C. Lane, 1915

Member of the Hawaii Senate from the 3rd district
- In office 1905–1907

2nd Mayor of Honolulu
- In office 1915–1917
- Preceded by: Joseph J. Fern
- Succeeded by: Joseph J. Fern

Personal details
- Born: July 22, 1872 Makao, Oahu, Kingdom of Hawaii
- Died: February 8, 1958 (aged 85)
- Party: Republican
- Spouse: Alice Kia Nāhaolelua
- Relations: Lot Lane

Military service
- Allegiance: Kingdom of Hawaii
- Branch/service: Royal Guard Royalist Insurgency
- Battles/wars: Revolution of 1893; Revolution of 1895; Battle of Diamond Head

John Awena-ika-lani-keahi-o-ka-lua-o-Pele Carey Lane, (July 22, 1872 – February 8, 1958) was Mayor of Honolulu from 1915 to 1917.

== Early years ==
Born at Makao, Oʻahu, Lane was educated at Hauula School and St. Louis College. He held various jobs as a clerk, and from 1893 to 1900 farmed near Honolulu. John Lane was one of 12 children born of William Carey Lane (1821–1895), an Irish sea captain, and Mary Kukeakalani Kahooilimoku, a Koolau chiefess. Born in County Cork, Ireland, his father was said to be a descendant of Irish kings. Lane's grandfather, a staunch Catholic, had forfeited his lands and moved to New York, taking his son William with him. William Carey Lane later ended up in Hawaii where he married a Hawaiian chiefess. Kukeakalani was the daughter of Kukanaloa, a member of King Kamehameha I's court who served as the keeper of the king's personal war canoe.

== Military service ==
John and his brothers, Lot and James, were members of Queen Liliʻuokalani's personal guard at ʻIolani Palace.

They were avowed royalists, and John Lane "was at her side when they usurped control and dethroned her in 1893, and was among those who took part in the counter-revolution in 1895 with the hope of restoring her throne and native Hawaiian rule," wrote Kathleen Dickensen Mellen in a 1954 Honolulu Advertiser article. He was captured during the Battle of Diamond Head along with Harry Bertleman, a fellow insurgent. He was charged with treason but later acquitted.

== Political life ==
Lane was a devoted follower of the monarchy and joined the Hawaii Republican Party to be aligned with Prince Jonah Kūhiō Kalaniana'ole. Lane became a member of the Hawaii Territorial Senate from 1905 to 1907 and introduced the bill establishing the City and County of Honolulu. He married Alice Kia Nāhaolelua on March 13, 1909 at Honolulu. He failed to win the post of mayor in 1908 and 1910, but was elected by an overwhelming majority in 1914. He was defeated in his bid for re-election in 1917 by the previous mayor Joseph J. Fern. Appointed high sheriff of the territory and warden of Oʻahu Prison in 1922, he resigned in 1932 during charges of lax administration and because of ramifications of the Massie Trial. He continued his public service career by serving on various boards until 1946, including the Board of Registration, the Hawaii Jubilee Commission, and the Kamehameha Day Commission.
