= 1895 Wilcox rebellion =

Monarchist revolt in the Republic of Hawaii

- Part of the Hawaiian rebellions (1887–1895)
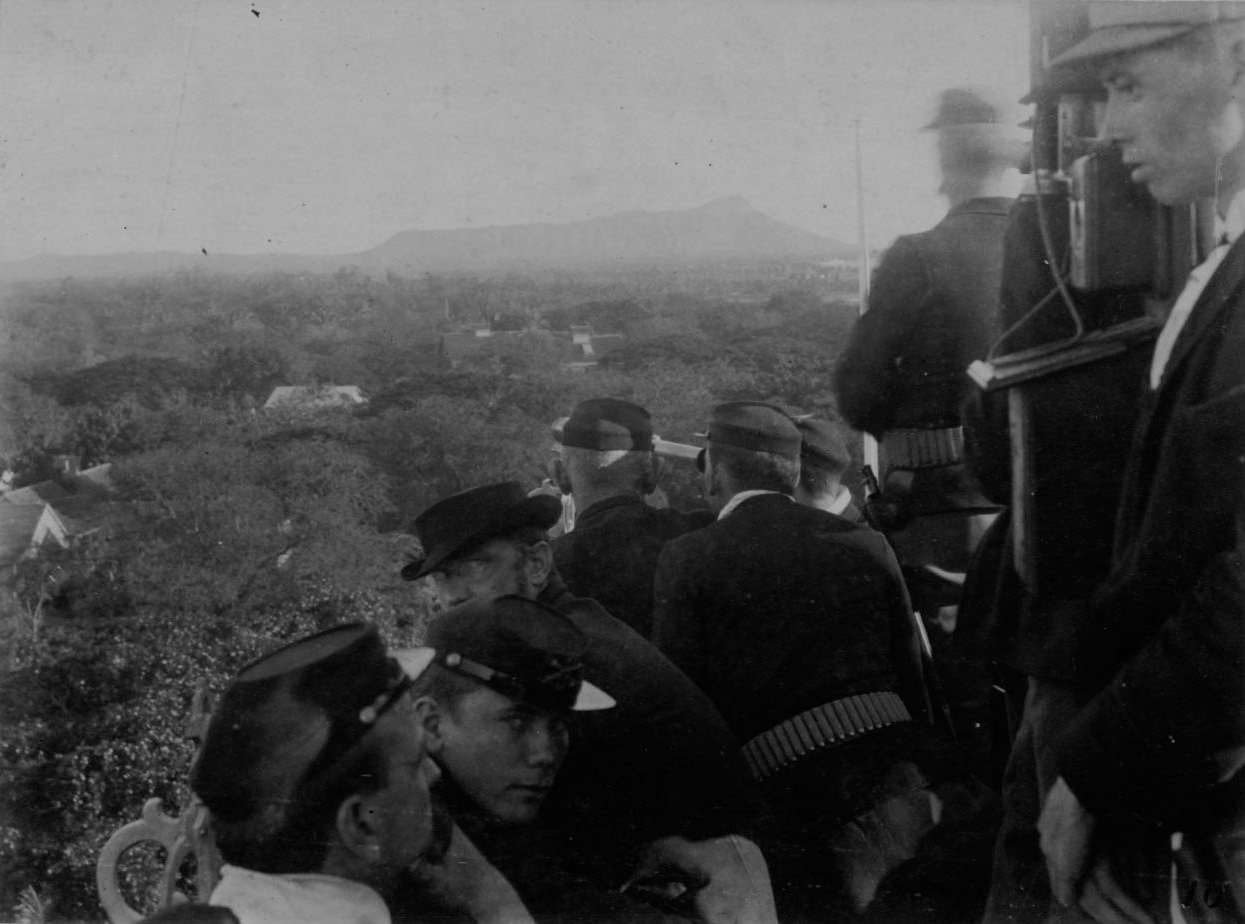
- National Guardsmen atop ʻIolani Palace during the Battle of Kamoiliili.
Date	January 6–9, 1895
Location	Oahu, Hawaii
Result	Republic of Hawaii victory: Queen Liliʻuokalani formally abdicates the throne; End of the Hawaiian Monarchy; Annexation of Hawaii

Belligerents
Republic of Hawaii	Monarchy Loyalists

Commanders and leaders
Sanford B. Dole; Edward G. Hitchcock	Liliʻuokalani (Disputed); Samuel Nowlein (POW); Robert W. Wilcox (POW)

Strength
1,200; 500 Citizens' Guards; 5 Companies National Guard of Hawaii; 2 Companies, Regular Army; Police Force	400–500

Casualties and losses
1 killed	Several killed 190–220 captured Most deserted

The 1895 Wilcox rebellion or the Counter-Revolution of 1895 (Note: Also known as the second Wilcox rebellion of 1895, the revolution of 1895, the Hawaiian counter-revolution of 1895, the 1895 uprising in Hawaii, the Hawaiian civil war, the 1895 uprising against the provisional government, and the uprising of 1895.) was a brief war from January 6 to January 9, 1895, that consisted of three battles on the island of Oahu, Republic of Hawaii. It was the last major military operation by royalists who opposed the overthrow of the Hawaiian Kingdom.

Because of its brevity and few casualties, this conflict is largely forgotten; in some cases those who rediscover it coin a new name for the conflict, but it is frequently referred to as a "counter-revolution".

== Background ==
=== Republic of Hawaii ===
Following the 1887 Hawaiian Constitution and the 1893 coup d'état, a temporary government was formed by the Committee of Safety until an assumed annexation by the United States. They were successful with President Benjamin Harrison in negotiating an annexation treaty; however, Harrison's term in office came to an end before the treaty could be ratified by Congress. The new President, Grover Cleveland, opposed the idea of annexation, being an anti-imperialist himself, and withdrew the annexation treaty upon taking office. After commissioning the secret Blount Report, he stated that the US had inappropriately used military force and called for the reinstatement of Queen Liliʻuokalani. The matter was referred by Cleveland to Congress after Sanford Dole refused Cleveland's demands, and the US Senate held a further investigation, culminating in the Morgan Report, which completely rejected that there had been any US involvement in the overthrow.

The Provisional Government feared that President Cleveland might continue to support the queen by restoring the monarchy. The Provisional Government also realized there would be no annexation until Cleveland's term of office ended; and they wanted to establish a more permanent government until another president, more favorable toward annexation, came to office. Therefore, the Provisional Government called to order a Constitutional Convention on May 30, 1894. The Constitutional Convention drafted a constitution for a Republic of Hawaii. The Republic of Hawaii was proclaimed on 4 July 1894 at Aliiolani Hale. The Republic was a single-party oligarchy.

=== Royalist plans ===
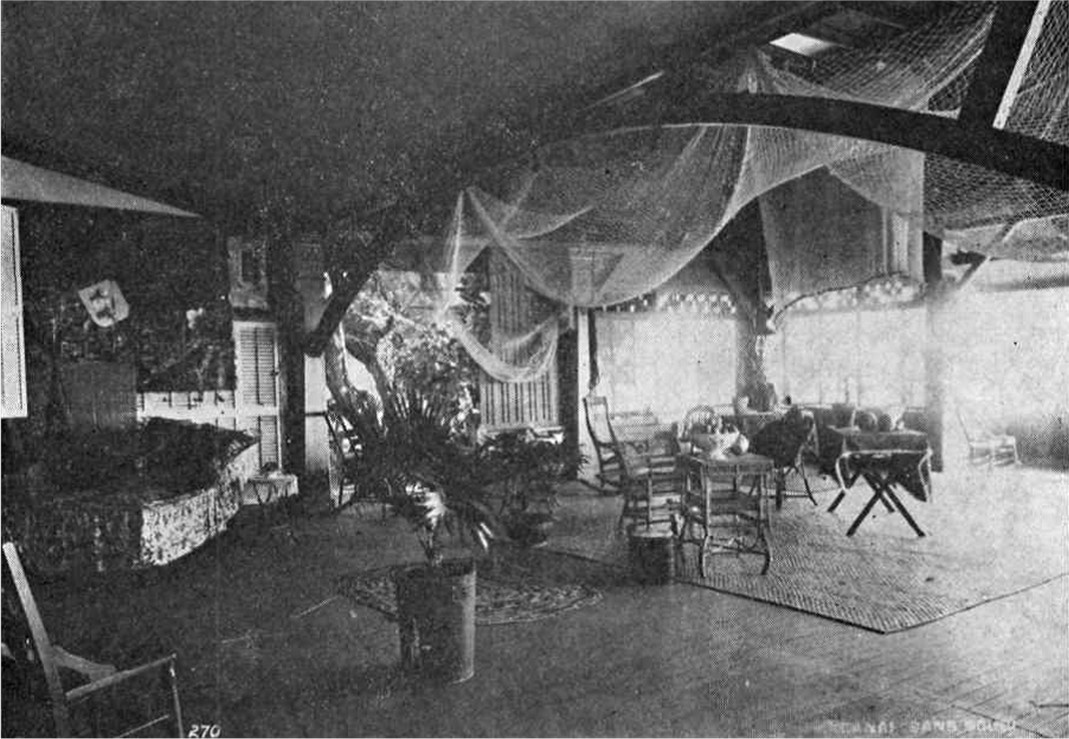
Sans Souci Hotel was one location the conspirators meet, run by Royalist George Lycurgus.

In 1895, Robert Wilcox was brought into a plot to overthrow the Republic of Hawaii and return Queen Liliʻuokalani to the throne. Among the plotters was Samuel Nowlein, former Head of the Royal Guards of Hawaii (which had been disbanded in 1893); Joseph Nawahi, former Minister of Foreign Affairs; Charles T. Gulick, an advisor to both Kalākaua and Liliʻuokalani; and William H. Rickard, a sugar planter of British parentage. These men planned to attack government buildings in downtown Honolulu at night. They had recruited a number of poor Hawaiians, most of them day laborers from the outskirts of Honolulu, but failed to fill their quota of 700 recruits. In addition the recruits lacked weapons, training and discipline, and were pitted against the formidable forces of the Provisional Government, which had spent the royal treasury and secured loans to arm itself thoroughly against such an attack.

The rebels had purportedly smuggled arms to Liliʻuokalani to resupply them once the palace was secured. A shipment of guns and ammunition from California had been smuggled on board the schooner Wahlber to be put aboard the steamer Waimanalo near Rabbit Island and shipped to a secret Honolulu location.

== Battle of Diamond Head ==
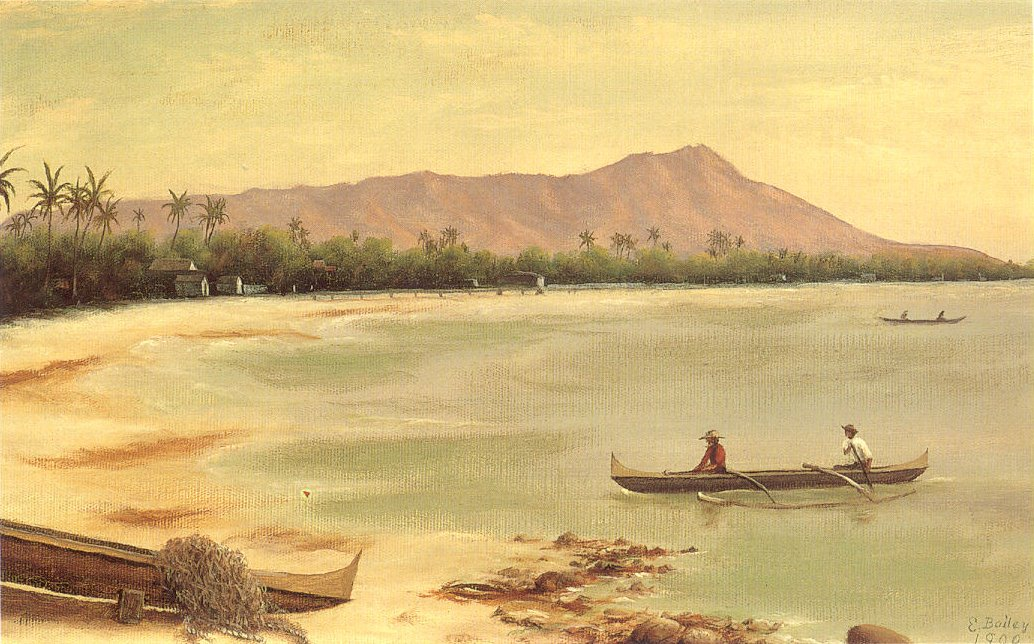
Diamond Head and Waikīkī beach,1890

Rumors were circulating on January 6, 1895, that armaments were being landed on Waikīkī beach, Oahu. A squad of six policemen led by Captain Parker, a veteran of the 1889 rebellion who commanded the 30 Royal Guards in the Palace, had been sent to Henry Bertelmann's house near Diamond Head to search for the weapons. They did not know Bertelmann was a Lieutenant in the insurgency. As Deputy Marshal Brown read the warrant to Bertleman, the squad was fired upon by three Royalists returning from the beach, that took shelter in Bertleman's canoe house. The police advanced toward the canoe house until the Royalists were driven off, but not before Charles L. Carter, an armed civilian accompanying the police, was shot three times in the chest. Bertleman shot and wounded police lieutenant Holi as the policemen returned to the house. The policemen subdued Bertleman and another rebel, John Lane, in the first clash and took shelter in Bertleman's house. 70 Royalists in the surrounding area joined the battle attacking the house. They were commanded by Colonel Robert Wilcox and Lieutenant Lot Lane, an intimidating six foot Irish-Hawaiian. The Royalists surrounded the house but three men escaped: Captain Parker, Deputy Marshal Brown, and Alfred Wellington Carter (Charles Carter's cousin). The police officers mounted their horses and sent word of the uprising, while Alfred Carter searched for a doctor. A detachment of the National Guard of Hawaii, Company E commanded by Lt. King, drove back the Royalists towards Diamond Head by 9:00, allowing Alfred Carter to bring doctors Walter, Murry, and Doyle to his cousin. The battle continued into the night. The Royalists managed to repel the soldiers from their fallback position. By dawn of January 7, the government forces withdrew to Sans Souci Beach in Waikīkī near Sans Souci Hotel run by Royalist George Lycurgus at Kapiolani Park west of Diamond Head and awaited reinforcements, ending the battle.

C. L. Carter, nephew of supreme court justice Albert Francis Judd and son of former Kingdom diplomat Henry A. P. Carter, died from his wounds later that day. Two other police officers were also wounded and sent to a hospital. Bertleman and Lane were sent to the police station, where they were imprisoned. Although the Royalists had triumphed in the first battle of the war, they had lost the element of surprise. Consequently, this victory would be short-lived.

== Battle of Mōʻiliʻili ==
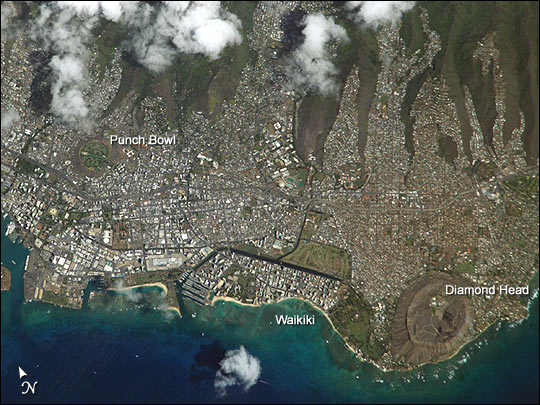
Honolulu

On January 7, 1895 martial law was declared in Hawaii by President Sanford B. Dole. The men led by Lieutenant Sam Nowlein rendezvoused with Colonel Robert Wilcox at Diamond Head. Following the Republic government's humiliating defeat, Marshal Edward G. Hitchcock deployed men and three artillery pieces to stop the Royalists' march on Honolulu. An additional detachment of 25 men led by Lieutenant Coyne was sent, and met Lieutenant King near Sans Souci Beach at Kapiolani Park on the east end of Waikiki. King had sent a group of men to the rim of Diamond Head to attack the Royalists from above, while Coyne had received a field piece and zeroed in on a group of 100 Royalists on the slopes of the volcano. The artillery was at first too inaccurate to be effective, and it took several barrages to dislodge Wilcox's men. It is noted that one round was so inaccurate that it missed Diamond Head completely, sailing over the crater and landing in the sea. The final bombardment inflicted several casualties and scattered the group. Wilcox saw no tactical importance in remaining on Diamond Head and ordered his men to retreat to Waialae to rest. The new strategy was to move north into Koʻolau Mountains then west, avoiding the government forces in south.

Nowlein's men opened fire near Diamond Head at Mauʻumae at a group of police along Waialae Road commanded by T. B. Murray and, though they caused no casualties, the police withdrew anyway. The Republic's army moved toward the Royalists with two of the government's cannons. The third cannon was put aboard a commandeered tugboat named Eleu to form a makeshift patrol boat. The Eleu attacked Wilcox’s men with grapeshot at Waialae, on the northeast side of Diamond Head. The Royalists were centered around Anton Rosa’s residence, the former headquarters for the Royalists with an arms cache, which was captured.

Nowlein's men were to capture Punchbowl, but had been waiting in hiding at Mauʻumae as government troops were moving toward Diamond Head. T. B. Murray's group of police on reconnaissance along Waialae Road were sent toward their position. As they approached, Nowlein's men fired at them and the policemen retreated. Murray's men returned with Company F commanded by Captain C. W. Zeiler from Palolo, sent to engage Nowlein at Kaimuki as they moved toward Mōʻiliʻili. Nowlein's men were driven back to Mauʻumae, where there were ammo caches and boulders for cover. The fighting led to a deadlock. Due to the distance between the opposing forces, and protective cover on both sides, neither combatant could inflict casualties on the other. Finally the government forces broke the stronghold when a howitzer was brought to bear to end the stalemate and 33 of Nowlein's men surrendered, though Nowlein himself escaped with officers and a few men although he disliked the idea of abandoning his men, his officers convinced him that it was strategic to prevent him from being captured or killed if he remanded in the stronghold.

As the Eleu began to attack Waialae, Wilcox moved his men through the mountains, advancing toward Honolulu. His men moved to the settlement of Mōʻiliʻili, at the mouth of Mānoa Valley, where they encountered a line of Captain Zeiler's Company, and also met with artillery fire. Captain Camara supported Zeiler in securing his flank, positioning his Company C in Nuʻuanu and Punchbowl, cutting off the western advance by the Royalists. The Royalists retreated and entrenched themselves among the stone walls and lantana foliage of the area. Zeiler advanced on them. Wilcox awaited Nowlein's attack on Punchbowl to relieve his men of the government forces, but this never came. The Royalists could not hold their ground against Zeiler's men and retreated into the valley. At the end of the battle 40 Royalists surrendered and were taken prisoner, while one of Zeiler's men was wounded. The battle had lasted a day, and several Royalists had been killed.

== Battle of Mānoa ==
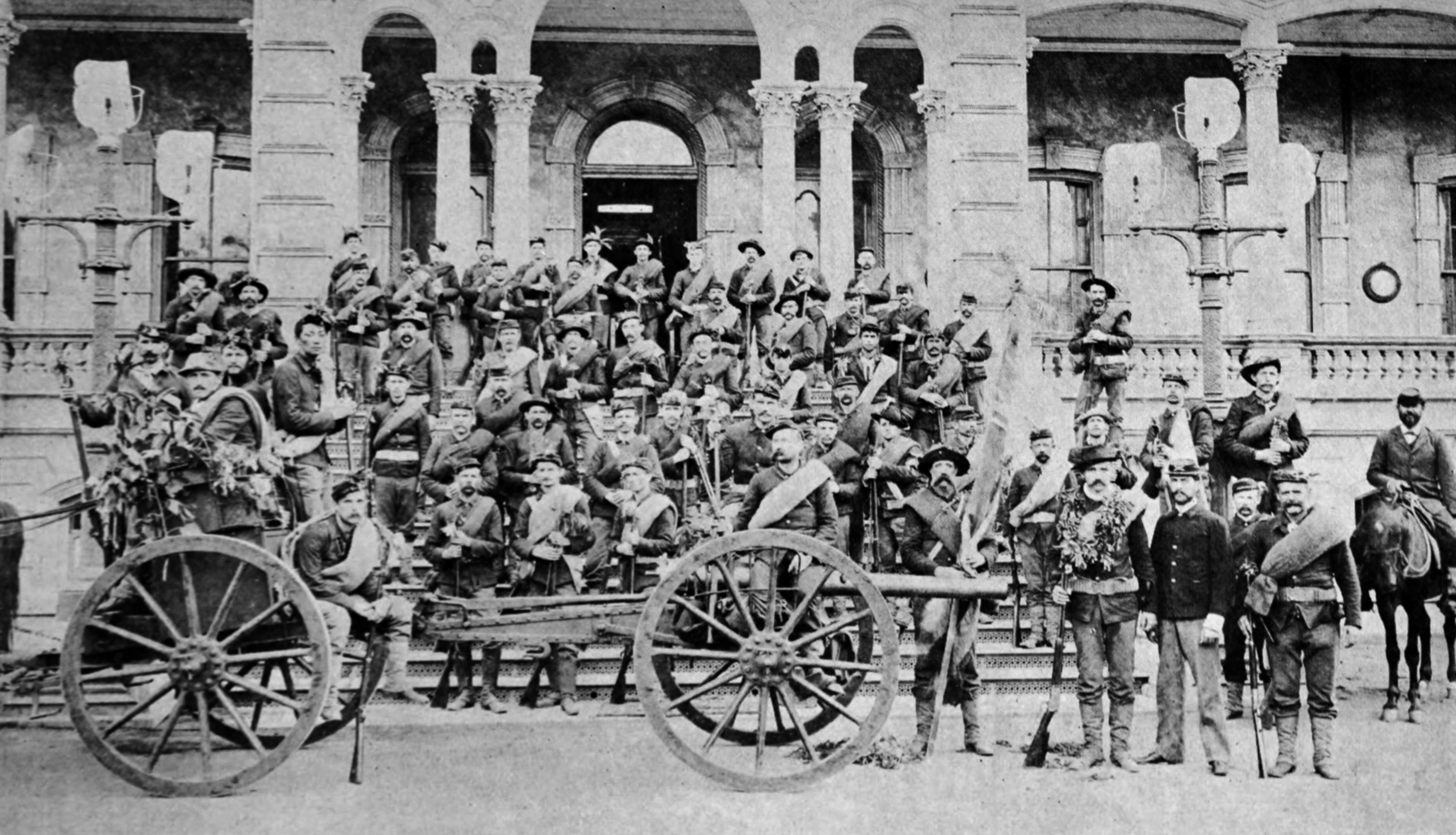
National Guard Company F commanded by Captain C. W. Zeiler shortly after the Battle of Mānoa

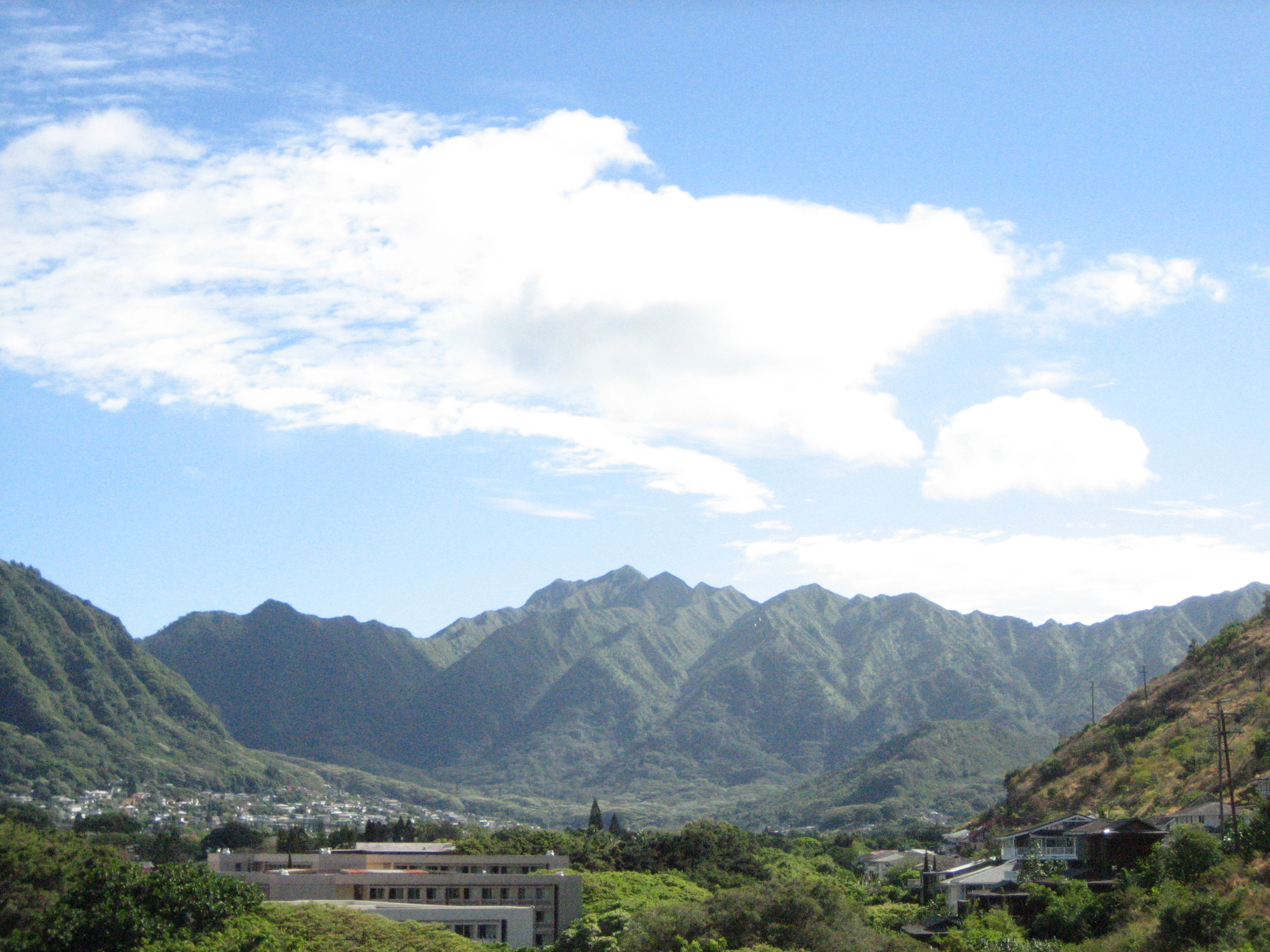
Mānoa Valley

The final battle took place on January 9. The Royalists had withdrawn following their defeat at Moʻiliʻili. Wilcox was down to 100 men and retreated into Mānoa Valley. Most of Wilcox's men had not eaten since the start of the rebellion and spirits were low. The Republican Government forces did not immediately pursue the Royalists because a riot had broken out among Japanese plantation workers in ʻEwa, and the government, in reaction, drew forces away from the nearly crushed rebellion to deal with this new threat. Reconnaissance patrols were sent into and around the Koʻolaus and concluded that the Royalist force was still in Mānoa Valley. They employed the Eleu to patrol the coast and destroyed suspicious unattended boats. The government forces that remained were ordered to guard the entrance to the valley in order to keep the Royalist force contained.

A Royalist force of 50 men was spotted on the evening of the 9th attempting to scale Tantalus and move through Punchbowl to enter the city. A gun battle ensued between Company A commanded by Capt. P. Smith, backed by Company D. commanded by Lt. Jones with a field piece against the Royalists, leaving one Royalist dead. The Royalists were pushed to the back of the valley where they were surrounded by mountains on three sides. Until nightfall, the doomed company withstood the ensuing siege and artillery barrage in the pocket known as "the Pen", at the base of Puʻu Konahuanui. The Royalists then climbed the steep slopes to escape under the cover of darkness. The battle had lasted three hours with two rebels captured, three confirmed dead, and most managing to escape.

After the climb up the ridge the Royalists' fates varied. Many felt the revolution was a failure and deserted. Others wished to continue the fight but were separated from Wilcox's leadership and would eventually be captured or killed by government forces routing out the remaining Royalists. Wilcox moved over ancient footpaths to Nuʻuanu Valley and Kalihi, where the group of 10 eventually disbanded.

== Aftermath ==
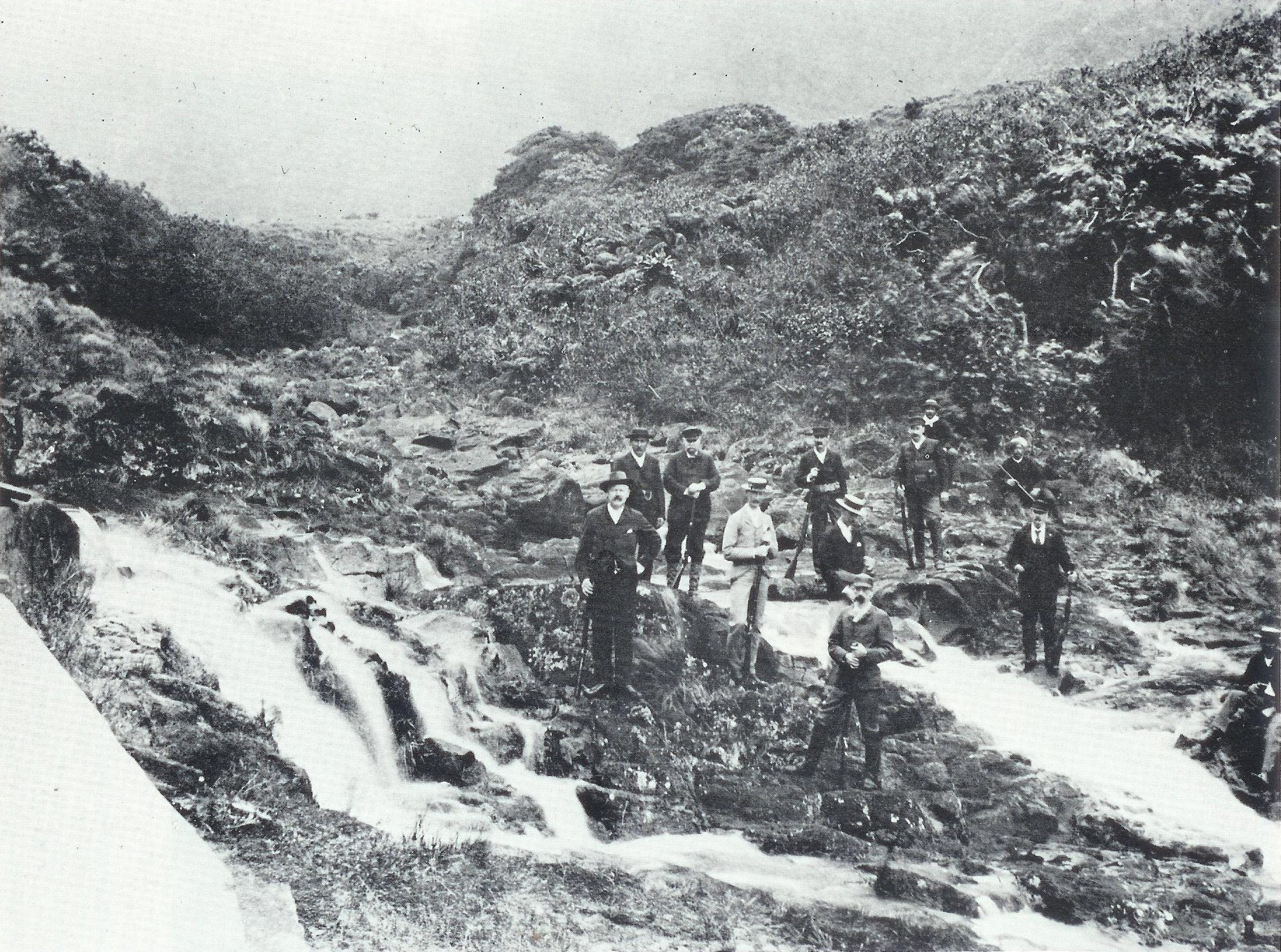
Citizens' Guards in Nuuanu Valley sent to drive out remaining insurgents

Skirmishes continued for a week after the victory in Mānoa as the military eradicated the areas of resistance in the Koʻolaus. The edibles of tropical forests of Hawaii are quite scarce; contrary to popular belief, of which says that it is abundant. The early Native Hawaiians brought crops of their own when they settled the islands, although vegetation is bountiful, few plants are fit for eating. As a consequence most insurgents were driven out by starvation.

All the Royalist leaders were arrested. A barracks was converted into a prison to hold the captured rebels. On January 8, 1895, the captain of the Steamer Waimanalo, William Davies, and several crewmembers were arrested for distributing arms.

Nowlein was caught with three lieutenants on January 14 in Mōʻiliʻili. They had been fed by Native Hawaiian sympathizers while in hiding.

Wilcox hid for several days in the mountains and made his way to Nuʻuanu Valley and Kalihi with 10 loyal conspirators, but the group was disbanded. He surrendered on January 16, 1895, in a fishing hut near Kalihi.

Lane hid in the Koʻolaus above Mānoa for ten days after the final battle. He came out of hiding after fighting subsided believing a foreign intervention had come, after asking a passerby he discovered the revolution was crushed. Contrary to the fears of Lane and the warning to government forces to use caution when encountering him, he surrendered peacefully to police becoming the last insurgent to be captured. After being brought to police headquarters he was escorted by six guards in fear he may overpower the regular amount for a normal prisoner. He was locked in with over a hundred under-nourished prisoners of war, he protested that night using the guards' fears about him to provide food for his fellow inmates. It was believed that most of the Royalists had evaded capture, and with their identities not known had slipped back into the community to return to their lives before the revolution.

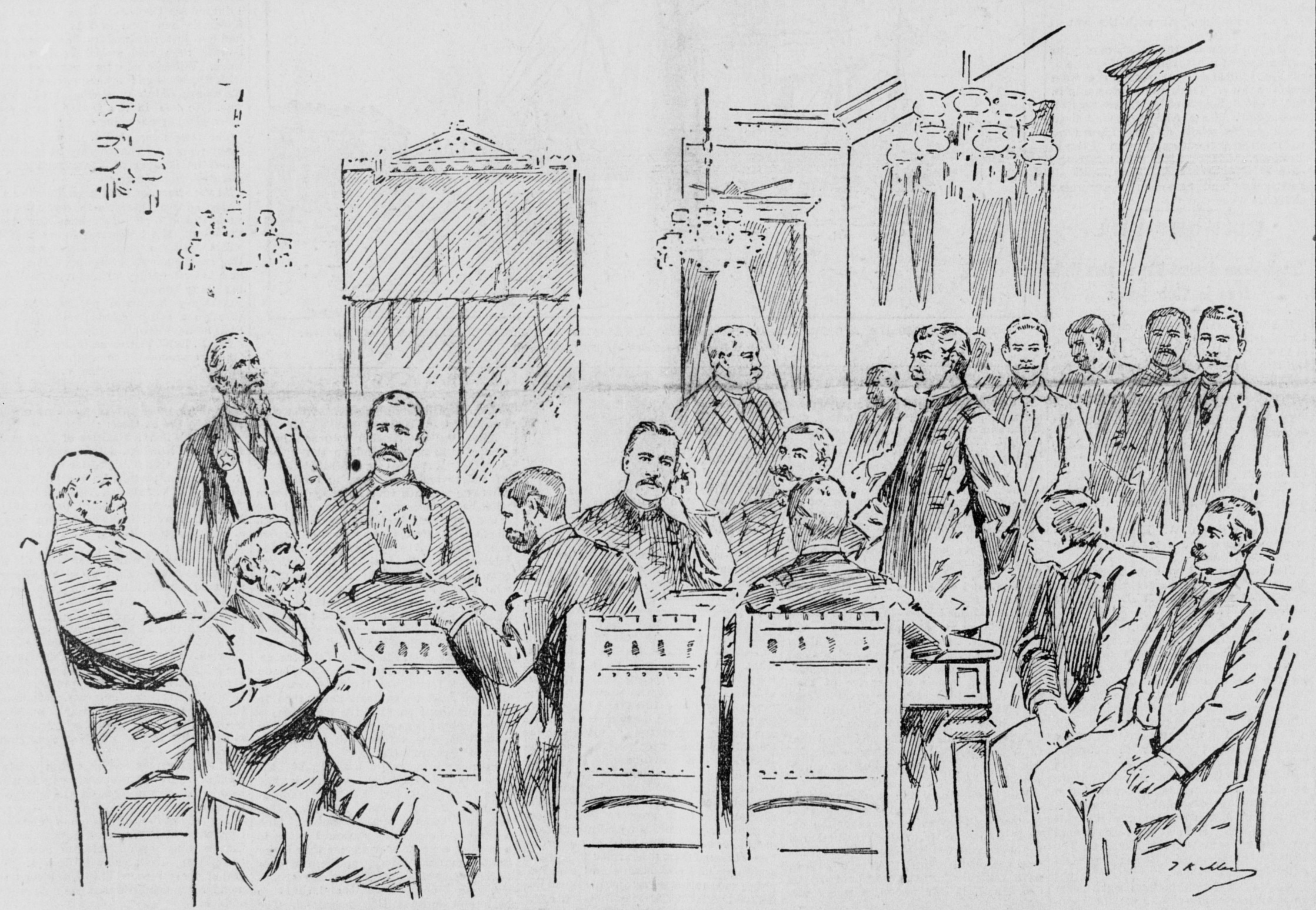
The 1895 trial in former ʻIolani Palace throne room

A weapons cache was found and attributed to Liliʻuokalani. She was arrested on January 16. Wilcox was tried for treason (as he had after the Wilcox rebellion of 1889) by a military tribunal with the other military leaders. This time he was found guilty and sentenced to death, but the sentence reduced to 35 years. Liliʻuokalani and other political leaders were tried and convicted for misprision of treason by those who had overthrown the Kingdom. The former attorney general of the Kingdom Paul Neumann served as legal defense, and prosecutor was William Ansel Kinney. Liliʻuokalani formally abdicated her throne to prevent further bloodshed over the controversial government in a five-page letter on January 24, 1895. The president of the republic, Sanford B. Dole, pardoned the royalists after they served part of their prison sentence.
