= Di Lotti =

Di Lotti is a surname. Notable people with the surname include:

- Silvana Di Lotti (born 1942), Italian composer
- Vlasta Kálalová Di Lotti (1896–1971), Czech entomologist and doctor

== See also ==
- Lotti
