= Lot Torelli =

Italian sculptor

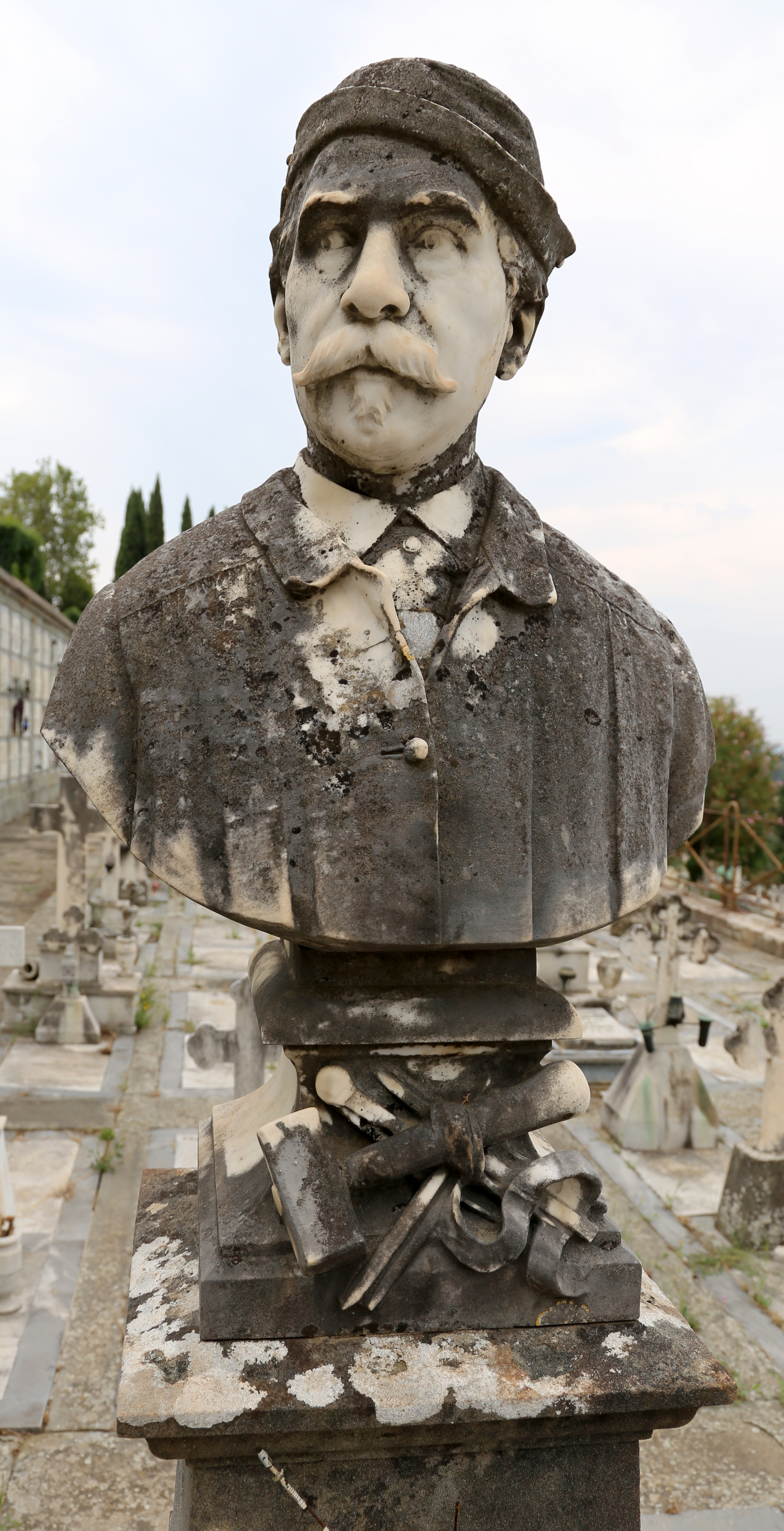
Self-portrait

Lot Torelli (October 30, 1835, in Florence – 1896) was an Italian sculptor.

He studied at the Academy of Fine Arts, but in 1858, due to family misfortunes, had to leave Florence for Paris. He returned the next year, enrolling as a volunteer in the war of Independence. By 1862, he returned to making sculpture. In 1865, he won a three-year stipend from the academy.

Among his major works are: a medallion representing the future Queen, Princess Margherite, exhibited at Florence in 1871; Adam and Eve, which became statues on the facade of the Duomo of Florence. He submitted sculptures to the 1876 Centennial Exposition, Philadelphia. Other works were completed alongside Giuseppe De Fabris include Il mar glaciale, bronze bas relief and The Angel Messenger of Peace found in the urban cemetery of Pisa.

Torelli completed many funereal monuments, including one commissioned by Marchesa Toscanelli for her son Giovanni, who is buried at his villa alla Chiocciola near Florence; another for signora Giulia Mari and her daughter for the cemetery of Jacopo in Terenzano. He completed portraits of the son of Mr Doggett of Chicago; the son of Mr Waldo, of New York; of the Duke Pado of Mecklenburg Schwerin; and of Mrs Fiyrer of London. He sculpted a Triton for a fountain. Tasso as a youth; The Shameful; Psiche al laccio; Colomba messaggera; Pescatori; a half-figure of an old man titled Last Loves; Soap Bubbles (a half-figure); La sorpresa; The princess of Wales; Fior di Maria; Il soldatino; Shakspeare also called il fattorino del Beccaio; and Eve. Torelli was the winner of various prizes; in 1869, he won the gold medal at the Exposition for Encouragement of Fine Arts in Rome; in 1871, the Cross of Gold at the International Exhibition in London; and gold medals in Florence, Vienna, and Philadelphia. He became professor of the Academy of Fine Arts of Florence.
