= William Ansel Kinney =

American lawyer

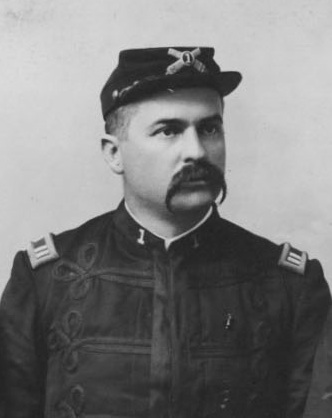
- William Ansel Kinney in 1895
- Born: October 16, 1860; Honolulu, Hawaii
- Died: c. 1930
- Education: University of Michigan
- Occupation: Lawyer
- Spouse: Alice Vaughan McBryde

William Ansel Kinney (October 16, 1860 – c. 1930) was a lawyer and politician in the Kingdom of Hawaii, through the Republic of Hawaii and into the Territory of Hawaii.

== Family ==
William Ansel Kinney was born October 16, 1860, in Honolulu, Hawaii. His father was William Kinney, who was born April 15, 1832, in Chebogue, Nova Scotia. His uncle Joseph Robbins Kinney (1839–1919) was a member of the House of Commons of Canada. His father came to the Hawaiian Islands in the 1850s and married his mother Caroline Dailey (died March 25, 1897) on July 6, 1857. His father then married up to three different native Hawaiian women, having many other children by them. For example, half-brother William Kihapiʻilani Kinney (1868–1953) married Mary Francesca Vierra, and their son Ernest Kaipoleimanu Kinney (1906–1987) married Esther Kauikeaulani Kaʻulili and had daughter Rubellite Kawena Kinney Johnson, who became a Hawaiian historian. The youngest half-sibling was Ray Kinney, born in Hilo September 26, 1900, who became a popular musician and composer. His father managed the sugarcane plantation at Honomu, Hawaii and died June 3, 1915.

== Law career ==
Kinney attended Royal School and later Punahou School 1874–1877 and worked as a clerk in a law office. He graduated from law school at the University of Michigan in 1883. He married Alice Vaughan McBryde on August 16, 1893 in Honolulu. His first law partner was Arthur P. Peterson. In 1887 he became partners with William Owen Smith and Lorrin A. Thurston. In 1887 he was elected to the legislature of the Hawaiian Kingdom as a representative from Hawaiʻi island. During the summer of 1887, he helped draft the 1887 Constitution of the Kingdom of Hawaii, called the "Bayonet Constitution" because King Kalākaua was forced to sign it. The government headed by Walter M. Gibson was forced to resign and was replaced by one including Thurston in the cabinet.

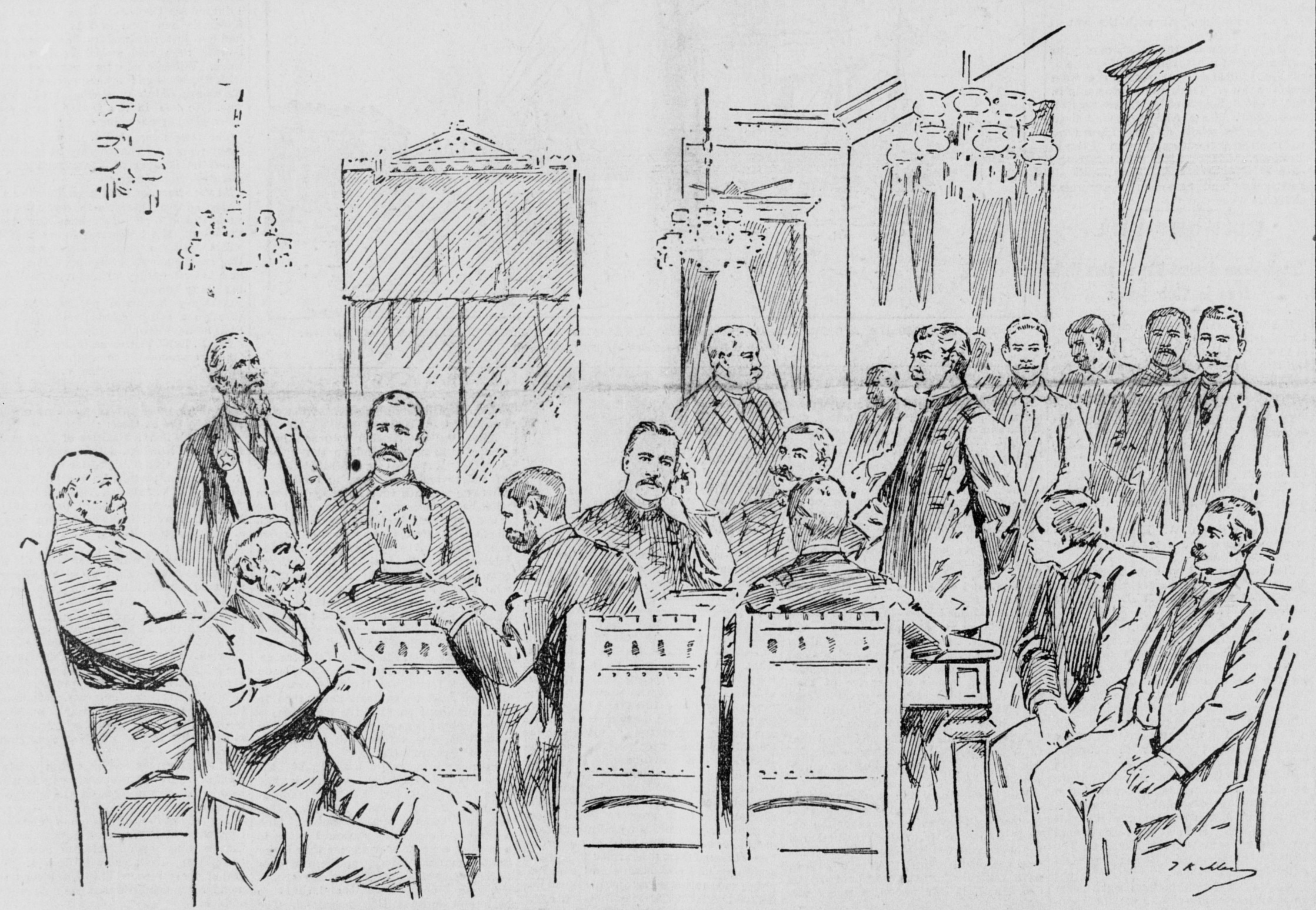
The 1895 trial in former ʻIolani Palace throne room; Kinney seated at far right

He moved to Salt Lake City, Utah, about 1891 and practiced law there. After the 1893 overthrow of the Kingdom of Hawaii, he was met by some of his former partners, including Thurston, as they visited the United States to lobby for annexation in February. After Queen Liliʻuokalani was arrested in January 1895 following the failed 1895 rebellion against the Republic of Hawaii, Kinney was selected as Judge Advocate (with honorary rank of Captain) to prosecute her in a military trial in her former throne room at ʻIolani Palace. She was convicted of misprision of treason. On March 7 he traveled to San Francisco to press charges against the people accused of shipping arms to the rebels.

On May 5, 1897, he was selected for another commission to lobby for annexation to the United States. He traveled to Washington, DC, and in reply to the Queen's protest was quoted with a comment that might sound racist by modern standards regarding native Hawaiians and Chinese and Japanese interests:

Their future is one of two things, to pass under Asiatic or Anglo-Saxon control. If Asiatics dominate, the native must become a coolie, for certainly he cannot expect to be better off than the rank and file of the dominant race....It is a choice between the status of a white American laborer and that of an Asiatic coolie laborer. The white race, if Asiatics absorb Hawaii, can get out to their own country.

This time US Secretary of State John Sherman signed a treaty with Kinney, Thurston, and New Hampshire lawyer Francis March Hatch on June 16, 1897. The Treaty of Annexation was unanimously adopted by the Senate of the Republic of Hawaii on September 9, 1897. The U.S. Senate passed it by vote of 42–21, the U.S. House of Representatives passed it by vote of 209–91, and President William McKinley signed it on July 7, 1898.

On his return, he heard that physician Jared Knapp Smith, brother of his former law partner who was then attorney general, had been killed on September 24, 1897. It was suspected to be in retaliation for ordering patients suspected of leprosy to exile in Kalaupapa, which had ignited the Leper War on Kaua'i four years earlier. Kinney sailed to Kauaʻi island and was appointed special prosecutor. A native Hawaiian suspect Kapea was arrested, tried on November 13, 1897, found guilty of first degree murder, and hanged on April 11, 1898.

In August 1900 he sued a newspaper editor for libel. In May 1901 he was sentenced to prison for contempt of court, but pardoned by Sanford B. Dole. His partnership was then called "Kinney, McClanahan & Cooper", including Henry Ernest Cooper who had chaired the Committee of Safety in 1893 and E. B. McClanahan. At least one of their cases, "Territory of Hawaii vs. Cotton Brothers & Company" of 1904 went to the United States Supreme Court. By 1906 the firm replaced Cooper with S. H. Derby. In June 1909 he represented the Hawaiian Sugar Planters' Association in a conflict during a strike by Japanese workers.

Despite his role in her trial, in November 1909 Kinney served as an attorney for deposed Queen Liliʻuokalani in a United States Court of Claims case "Liliuokalani v. The United States". His partners are listed as Sidney Miller Ballou and Anderson. The case claimed that the Queen was due compensation for the taking of the crown lands of the kingdom. In the decision known as 45 Ct. Cl. 418 (1910), the case was dismissed on May 16, 1910. The issue continues to be controversial, known as the ceded lands issue. Kinney's grand-niece Rubellite Kawena Kinney Johnson filed a similar case 80 years later which was also dismissed on appeal.

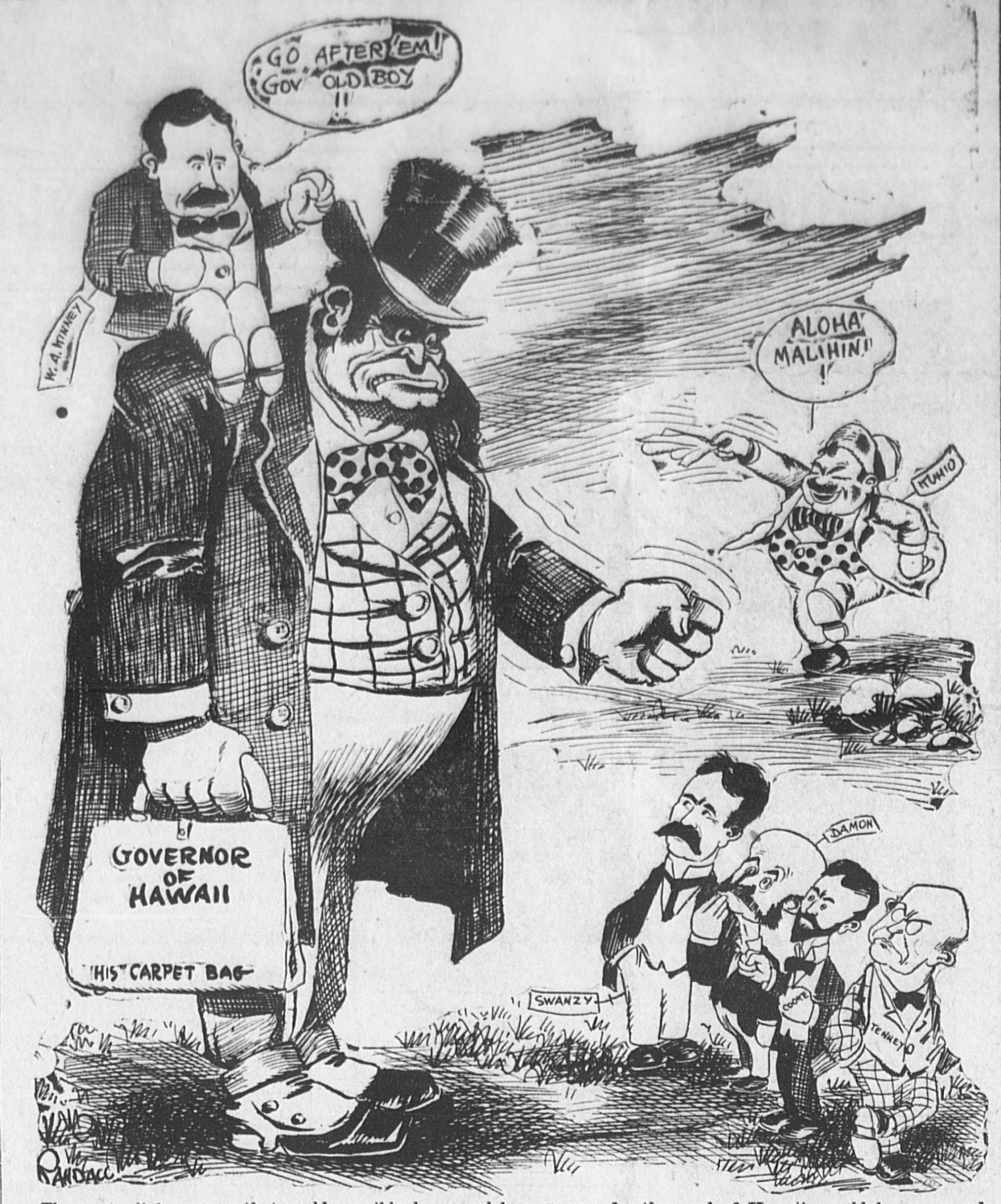
Political cartoon of 1912 depicting Kinney on the shoulder of a governor going after sugarcane plantation interests

Kinney grew disenchanted with the territorial government. Instead of the labor reform he had hoped for, he considered the sugarcane plantation owners, known as the "Big Five", an oligopoly which continued to exploit cheap workers. By 1912 he joined with congressional delegate Jonah Kūhiō Kalanianaʻole in public opposition to appointed Territorial Governor Walter F. Frear. Kūhiō was the only territorial-wide elected official, although with no direct power. Earlier a firmly conservative Republican, Kinney switched to the Democratic Party of Hawaii. When Democratic President Woodrow Wilson was elected in 1912, Kinney lobbied for a strong reformer to be swiftly appointed as governor. Kinney was attacked in the Hawaii press (controlled by Republicans), and characterized as proposing a carpetbagger for governor. Frear said "Mr. Kinney would do better if he stayed here and worked for the best interests of the Territory, instead of going to Washington and complaining." Although the local party supported Lincoln Loy McCandless, it was not until November 1913 that Wilson appointed Lucius E. Pinkham. Pinkham had not lived in Hawaii and but had represented plantation owners and other industrialists earlier.

By the end of 1913 he was living in California, where he filed suit against Alexander & Baldwin, one of the Big Five who were agents for his in-laws' McBryde sugarcane plantation. In 1928 Kinney sued Utah Senator Reed Smoot and Mormon leader Heber J. Grant, accusing them of trying to prevent his book from being published. He died sometime after 1930 in California.
