= London Omnibus Traction Society =

Bus society

The London Omnibus Traction Society (LOTS) was formed in 1964 and is the largest society for bus enthusiasts in the United Kingdom, dedicated to buses in London and the Home Counties.

The Society produces two main publications:

- The London Bus (TLB) has facts, figures and news of the previous month, including route changes, operator news and rolling stock for London bus routes.
- London Bus Magazine (LBM) is produced quarterly and has articles, both current and historic, and an 'around and about' section showing pictures of current interest. The magazine is published by Ian Allan.

The society reports on the central area buses or 'red buses' and country area buses in the previous Green Line area, roughly bounded by Gravesend, Crawley, Guildford, Windsor, Aylesbury, Luton, Harlow and Tilbury.

Among many other publications are the Bus and Tram Fleetbook, which lists every bus and tram in the London and Home Counties area in public operation.

LOTS also has society meetings most months with speakers on different subjects.
