= Lot Lane =

Hawaiian lieutenant and insurgent

Lot Kamehameha Lane
- Lot Kamehameha Lane, c. 1948
- Born: 31 July 1864; Waialua, Hawaii
- Died: 18 December 1953 (aged 89)
- Relatives: John Carey Lane
- Military career
- Allegiance: Kingdom of Hawaii
- Branch: Royal Household Guard; Royalist Insurgency
- Service years: (?–1895)
- Rank: Lieutenant
- Commands: Battle of Diamond Head
- Conflicts: Overthrow of the Kingdom of Hawaii; Uprising of 1895

Lot Lonoikaua Kamehameha Carey Lane (1864–1953) was the last insurgent to be captured by government forces after the Uprising of 1895 in Hawaii. He advocated better treatment for prisoners of war by the Republic of Hawaii, while being incarcerated himself.

== Early life ==
Lane was born 31 July 1864 in Waialua and was personally named after Kamehameha V. He was a brother of John Carey Lane and of Irish-Hawaiian who claimed to be descended from Kamehameha I and the Irish Monarchy. He expressed this claim openly to fellow insurgents receiving the nickname "Kamehameha".

== Family ==
Lane married Elizabeth Lokai Kaohele who had their daughter Bernicia Kailiponi Lane (1898–1942).

== Military career ==
Lane was a Royal Guard during the Overthrow of the Kingdom of Hawaii. He joined the insurgency and was a Lieutenant and third-in-command in the 1895 Uprising under Robert W. Wilcox and Samuel Nowlein. Lane was known to be intimidating standing six feet tall. He was a Second-in-command during the Battle of Diamond Head where his brother was captured. During the Battle of Mānoa he was separated from the retreating insurgent force and fled into the Koʻolau mountains. He came out of hiding after fighting subsided believing a foreign intervention had come, after asking a passerby he discovered the Revolution was crushed. Contrary to the fears of Lt. Lane and the warning to Government Forces to use caution when encountering him, he surrendered peacefully to police becoming the last insurgent to be captured. After being brought to police headquarters he was escorted by six guards for fear that he might overpower the regular number for a normal prisoner. He was locked in with over a hundred undernourished POWs. He protested that night making noise with food trays and yelling to provide additional food. The guards gave in to his demands because of their fears of him.

== Later life ==
After Hawaii's annexation Lane became a US citizen and was given the right to vote.
