= Lottie =

Lottie may refer to:

== People ==
- Lottie (name), a list of people with the given name or nickname
- Lottie Deno (1844–1934), American gambler whose presumed real name is Carlotta J. Thompkins
- Lottie Gilson, Swiss comedian and vaudeville singer born Lydia Deagon (1862–1912)
- Lottie Lyell, stage name of Australian actress, screenwriter, editor and filmmaker Charlotte Edith Cox (1890–1925)
- Lottie Blair Parker, pen name of Charlotte Blair Parker (1858–1937), American playwright
- Lottie Pickford, stage name of Canadian-born actress Charlotte Smith (1893–1936), sister of Mary Pickford
- T. J. Lottie, American singer, member of former R&B group So Plush
- Lottie Kane, English reality television personality and cast member on Ladies of London

== Places ==
- Lottie, Louisiana, United States, an unincorporated community
- Lottie Lake, Canadian hamlet
- 3489 Lottie, a main-belt asteroid

== Other uses ==
- Lottie Dolls, children's fashion dolls made by Arklu Ltd.
- Severe Tropical Cyclone Lottie, a deadly 1973 Australian region cyclone that was originally named Natalie
- Lottie (file format), a file format for vectorial graphics

== See also ==
- Lott (disambiguation)
- Lotte (disambiguation)
- Lotti, a list of people with the surname
