= Lot =

Lot, LOT, The Lot or similar may refer to:

== Common meanings ==
=== Areas ===
- Land lot, an area of land
- Parking lot, for automobiles
- Backlot, in movie production

=== Sets of items ===
- A great many of something, as in, "There are a lot of beetles," or "There are lots of beetles."
- Lot number, in batch production
- Lot, a set of goods for sale together in an auction; or a quantity of a financial instrument

=== Chance ===
- Sortition (drawing lots)
  - Cleromancy, divination by casting lots
  - Arabian lots, or Arabic parts, an astrological divination technique

== People ==
- Lot (name), including a list of people with the given name
- Lot (biblical person), figure in the Book of Genesis
- King Lot, in Arthurian legend

== Places ==
- Lot, Belgium, a village in the municipality of Beersel
- Lot (department), in southwest France
- Lot (river), in southern France
- LOT, station code for Lostock railway station, Bolton, England
- LOT, IATA code and FAA identifier for Lewis University Airport, Illinois, US
- The Lot, or Samuel Goldwyn Studio, Hollywood, California, US

== Arts and media ==
=== Film and television ===
- The Lot (TV series), an AMC series
- The Lot (cinema), an American movie theater chain
- Backlot, in movie production
  - The Lot, or Samuel Goldwyn Studio, Hollywood, California, US
- Legends of Tomorrow, a science fiction series
- Lot Lohr, a character in the Dutch television show Sesamstraat (Sesame Street)

=== Other media ===
- Lot: Stories, a 2019 book by Bryan Washington
- The Lot (album), a 2013 compilation by Roger Taylor
- The Lot Radio, an online radio station in New York City
- "Lot", a story by Ward Moore
- "Lot", by Christie Front Drive from Christie Front Drive, 1994

== Businesses and organisations ==
- LOT Polish Airlines, the flag carrier airline of Poland
- The LOT Network Solution, a membership organization to avoid patent litigation
- National Weather Service Chicago, Illinois (WFO ID LOT)
- The Lot (cinema), an American movie theater chain

== Other uses ==
- Lot (unit), a unit of mass
- Large Orbiting Telescope, the Hubble Space Telescope
- lot, a device for steering a boat, as mentioned in Belyana
- Language of thought, a philosophical hypothesis

== See also ==
- On the Lot, a 2007 reality television show
- LOTS (disambiguation)
- Lott (disambiguation)
- Lotte (disambiguation)
- Lottie (disambiguation)
- IOT (disambiguation)
