= Lotti =

Lotti may refer to any of the following:

- Antonio Lotti (c.1667–1740), Italian composer
- Augusto Lotti (born 1996), Argentine footballer
- Brian Lotti, U.S. professional skateboarder
- Carlo Lotti (1916–2013), Italian engineer and professor of hydraulic construction
- Carola Lotti (1910–1990), Italian actress
- Cosimo Lotti (1571–1643), Italian engineer and landscape designer
- Helmut Lotti (born 1969), Belgian singer and songwriter
- Luca Lotti (born 1982), Italian politician
- Marcella Lotti della Santa (1831–1901), Italian opera singer
- Mariella Lotti (1921–2006), Italian film actress
- Massimo Lotti (born 1969), Italian footballer
- Maurizio Lotti (1940–2014), Italian politician
- Sahara Lotti (born 1977), U.S. screenwriter and actress

== See also ==
- Di Lotti
- Lottie (disambiguation)
