= Megan Lotts =

American academic art librarian

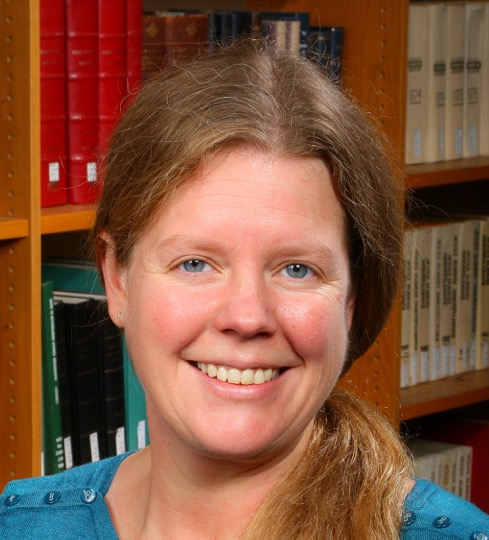
Megan Lotts, Art Librarian, Rutgers the State University of New Jersey

Megan Lotts is an American academic art librarian who is known for her research with Library makerspace, creativity, play, engagement, and academic library exhibition spaces.

Lotts was an Assistant Professor and Fine Arts librarian at Southern Illinois University. In 2012, she took the position of Art Librarian at Rutgers, the State University of New Jersey.

Lotts is also a mixed media artist.

== Projects ==
Thinking of you was a project overseen by Lotts which aimed to highlight the significance of “one of a kind” artworks, the importance of communication, and how the US postal service and art plays a role in our everyday lives.

The FLOAT Project was an art installation based on cardboard lotus flowers at the university
