= Trent Lott Center for Economic Development =

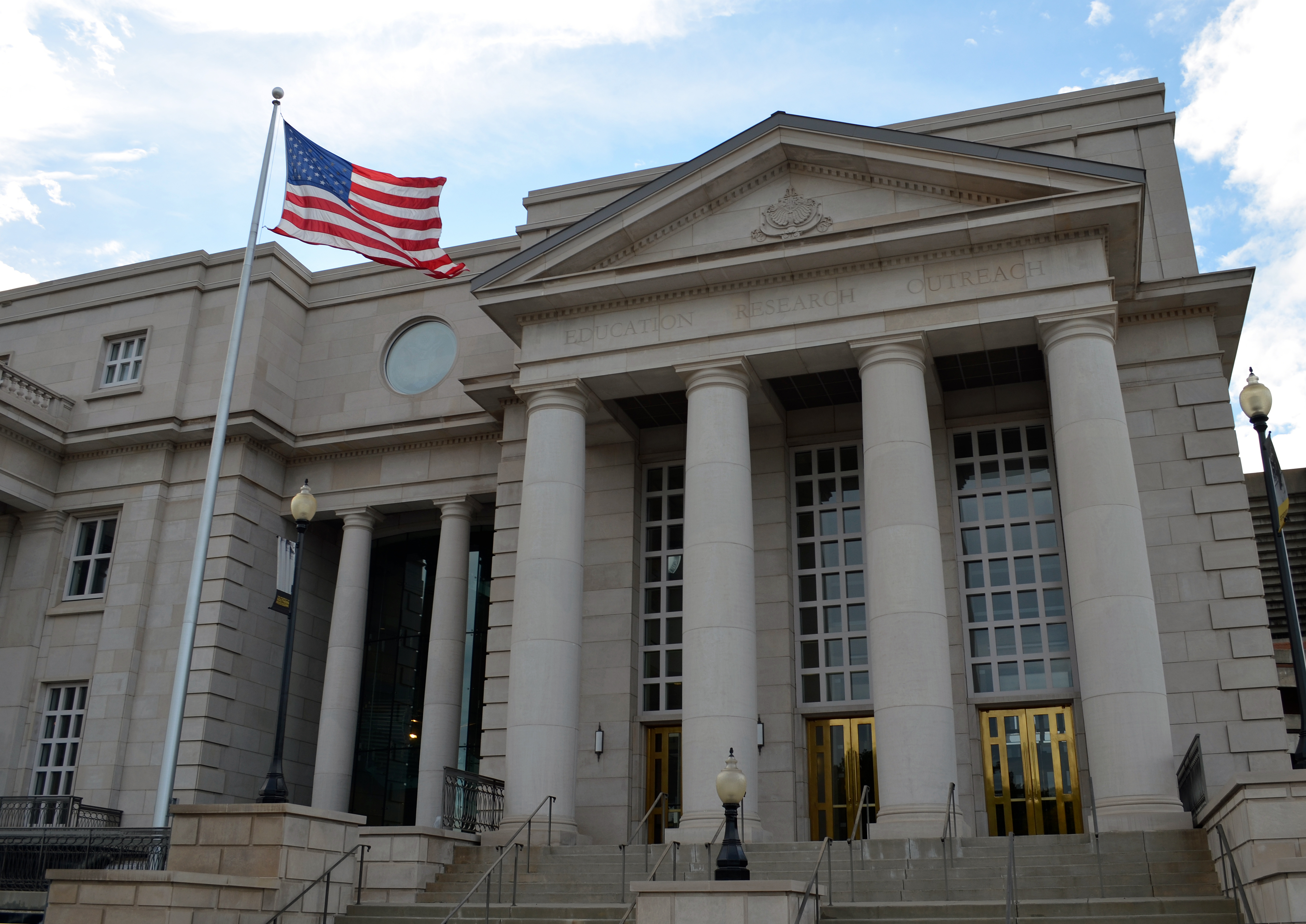
Trent Lott Center in 2016

Named after long serving Mississippi Senator Trent Lott, the Trent Lott Center for Economic Development and Entrepreneurship at The University of Southern Mississippi serves as the central authority regarding economic development service and research. Staff at The Center work alongside individuals, public entities, non-profit organizations, and businesses in order to effectively plan and implement activities that would, as a result, generate jobs and income. Furthermore, extended consideration is given to rural and impoverished areas within the state of Mississippi. The center provides expertise in strategic planning and leadership development; education and training; community analysis; and other technical support, and emphasizes client-requested assistance.

In addition, the building is the home to many of the university's economics and entrepreneurship courses, educational programs, and graduate training programs.

== Staff ==
- Shannon Campbell, Phd
- Tasha May
