= Lotts Creek Township, Ringgold County, Iowa =

Township in Ringgold County, Iowa, U.S.

Coordinates: 40°36′N 94°11′W

Lotts Creek Township is a township in Ringgold County, Iowa, USA. Lotts Creek is sourced from this township and is presumably where this township gets it name.
