= Lotte Tour Development =

South Korean tourism company

- Native name: 롯데관광개발
- Type: Public company
- Industry: Tourism
- Founded: May 24, 1971; 55 years ago
- Headquarters: Seoul, South Korea
- Revenue: ▲ ₩183.67 billion (2022) (US$141.38 million)
- Net income: ▼ – ₩224.7 billion (2022)
- Number of employees: 1,107 (2022)

Lotte Tour Development (Korean: 롯데관광개발) is a South Korean tourism corporation headquartered in Seoul. Lotte Tour serves as a travel agency, travel information provider, and casino proprietor. The company was founded in 1971 and is one of the largest travel businesses in the country. It was a subsidiary of Lotte Corporation until 2005 when it was split off. Lotte Tour owns the Jeju Dream Tower casino in Jeju City, the tallest building on Jeju Island. The entertainment news website MyDaily (Korean: 마이데일리) is affiliated with the corporation.

== History ==
Lotte Tour Development was founded on May 24, 1971.

In 2005, Lotte Tour divested from its parent company Lotte Corporation to become an individual entity. Despite the split, the smaller Lotte Tour kept its name and branding unchanged. In 2007, when Lotte Corporation partnered with JTB Corporation to form a new tourism division, it demanded that Lotte Tour change its branding, leading to a dispute. Lotte Tour was forced by injunction to change its logo but was allowed to retain its name.

In 2016, Lotte Tour announced that it had selected China State Construction Engineering Corporation to build its 38-story Jeju Dream Tower hotel and casino project on Jeju Island at a projected cost of ₩700 billion (US$605.1 million) with an opening date of March 2019. By the time the project was fully financed, the cost had risen to ₩1.6 trillion (US$1.4 billion). The building was opened to the public on December 18, 2020.
