= List of listed buildings in Kirkbean, Dumfries and Galloway =

This is a list of listed buildings in the parish of Kirkbean in Dumfries and Galloway, Scotland.

== List ==
Name	Location	Date Listed	Grid Ref. (Note: Sometimes known as OSGB36, the grid reference (where provided) is based on the British national grid reference system used by the Ordnance Survey. • "Guide to National Grid". Ordnance Survey. • "Get-a-map". Ordnance Survey.)	Geo-coordinates	Notes	LB Number (Note: Historic Environment Scotland assign a unique alphanumeric identifier to each designated site in Scotland, for listed buildings this always begins with "LB", for example "LB12345".)	Image
The Old School And Criffel View, Kirkbean Village				54°54′58″N 3°35′47″W	Category C(S)	10366	Upload Photo
Arbigland House Walled Garden And Fruit Stores				54°53′57″N 3°34′18″W	Category B	10372	Upload Photo
Southerness Lighthouse				54°52′22″N 3°35′42″W	Category A	10415	Upload another image See more images
Carsethorn Village 1, 2, 3 & 4 Wellington Buildings And Lochinvar (Including Shop)				54°55′24″N 3°34′23″W	Category B	10373	Upload Photo
Arbigland, John Paul Jones' Cottage With Kennels And Pump House				54°53′56″N 3°34′50″W	Category A	10397	Upload another image See more images
East Preston Cross, Plinth And Boundary Wall				54°53′30″N 3°36′33″W	Category B	49462	Upload Photo
Kirkbean Village Sundial At Churchyard Gate				54°55′02″N 3°35′37″W	Category C(S)	10365	Upload Photo
The Lotts (Formerly Stables To Cavens House)				54°54′40″N 3°35′51″W	Category B	10367	Upload Photo
Arbigland House Gatepiers At Main Drive				54°54′03″N 3°34′46″W	Category B	10370	Upload Photo
Torrorie House				54°53′54″N 3°37′36″W	Category B	10416	Upload Photo
Newmains Farmhouse And Gatepiers				54°54′08″N 3°36′29″W	Category B	10413	Upload Photo
Arbigland House Former Stables				54°54′05″N 3°34′40″W	Category B	10371	Upload Photo
Kirkbean Village Kirkbean Parish Church & Churchyard				54°55′02″N 3°35′35″W	Category B	10374	Upload Photo
Arbigland House				54°54′05″N 3°34′37″W	Category A	10398	Upload Photo
Prestonmill Village Bridge House				54°54′12″N 3°36′54″W	Category B	10414	Upload Photo
West Preston Farmhouse				54°53′12″N 3°37′31″W	Category C(S)	10417	Upload Photo

== Key ==
The scheme for classifying buildings in Scotland is:

- Category A: "buildings of national or international importance, either architectural or historic; or fine, little-altered examples of some particular period, style or building type."
- Category B: "buildings of regional or more than local importance; or major examples of some particular period, style or building type, which may have been altered."
- Category C: "buildings of local importance; lesser examples of any period, style, or building type, as originally constructed or moderately altered; and simple traditional buildings which group well with other listed buildings."

In March 2016 there were 47,288 listed buildings in Scotland. Of these, 8% were Category A, and 50% were Category B, with the remaining 42% being Category C.
