= Rubellite Kawena Johnson =

Historian of Hawaii

Rubellite "Ruby" Kawena Kinney Johnson is a Historian of Hawaii.

== Life ==
Her father was Ernest Kaipoleimanu Kinney (1906–1987) and mother was Esther Kauikeaulani Kaʻulili (1913–1979). Her maternal grandparents were Solomon Kamaha Kaʻulili and Kawena Ah Chong. Her paternal grandparents were William Kihapiʻilani Kinney (1868–1953) and Mary Francesca Vierra (c. 1879–1915). Her paternal great-grandfather was William Kinney (1832–1915) who came to the Hawaiian Islands from Nova Scotia. She was named for the mineral rubellite which is more commonly called tourmaline. Her grandfather was also known as K. W. Kinney to avoid confusion with his half-brother William Ansel Kinney who became a prominent lawyer and then betrayed the Queen in legal representation on behalf of the Kingdom of Hawaii. Another of her grandfather's half-brothers, Ray Kinney (1900–1979), became a popular Hawaiian musician. She was born on the island of Kauaʻi. She married geophysicist Rockne H. Johnson, and had four children: Dane Aukai, Moanilehua, Kaleihanamau and Lilinoe. She has 11 grandchildren.

From 1967 to 1993 she was on the faculty of the University of Hawaii, where she helped establish its Hawaiian studies program. She then became Professor Emeritus of Hawaiian Language and Literature and continued to publish. She researched the history of the Kumulipo, a sacred chant of Hawaiian mythology, and early newspapers in the Hawaiian language.

Johnson was named one of the Living Treasures of Hawai'i in 1983 by the Honpa Hongwanji Mission of Hawai'i. She was selected as an advisory committee to the United States Commission on Civil Rights. She generally opposes the Akaka Bill for its avoidance of child welfare matters and failure to bring trials for Hawaiian children. She submitted testimony as an expert witness on March 1, 2005, at the US Senate Committee on Indian Affairs.

== Works ==
- Rubellite Kawena Johnson (1975). Ka Nupepa ku'oko'a: a chronicle of entries, October, 1861-September, 1862. Topgallant. ISBN 978-0-914916-04-8.
- Rubellite Kawena Johnson; John Kaipo Mahelona (1975). Nā inoa hōkū: a catalogue of Hawaiian and Pacific star names. Topgallant. ISBN 0-914916-09-2.
- Rubellite Kawena Johnson (October 1981). Kumulipo, the Hawaiian hymn of creation. Topgallant Pub. Co. ISBN 978-0-914916-53-6.
- Armando M. Da Silva; Rubellite Kawena Johnson (May 1982). "Ahu a ʻUmi Heiau: A Native Hawaiian Astronomical and Directional Register". Annals of the New York Academy of Sciences. 385: 313–331. doi:10.1111/j.1749-6632.1982.tb34272.x.
- Rubellite Kawena Johnson (1983). Ahu a 'umi in the symbolic frame of cosmic time.
- Rubellite Kawena Johnson (1993). Kahoʻolawe's potential astro-archaeological resources. Kahoʻolawe Island Conveyance Commission.
- Charles Ahlo; Jerry Walker; Rubellite Kawena Johnson (2000). Kamehameha's children today. J. Walker.
- Rubellite Kawena Johnson (2000). The Kumulipo mind: a global heritage : in the Polynesian creation myth.
- "Political tsunami hits Hawaii". Washington Times. September 17, 2005.
- Ellie Crowe (February 1, 2007). Hawaii: a pictorial celebration. Photos by Elan Penn, Foreword by Rubellite Kawena Kinney Johnson. Sterling Publishing Company, Inc. p. 6. ISBN 978-1-4027-2407-7.
- "Hawaiian Perspective of the Environment and Kumulipo". Puana Ka ʻIke lecture. Kohala Center. March 2008. Archived from the original on July 5, 2010.
