= Lotts Creek (East Fork Grand River tributary) =

Stream in the U.S. state of Missouri

Lotts Creek is a stream in Ringgold County, Iowa and Harrison and Worth counties in Missouri. It is a tributary of the East Fork of the Grand River.

The stream headwaters arise at the confluence of two smaller stream approximately 1.5 miles southeast of Ellston at 40°49′01″N 94°05′02″W and an elevation of approximately 1140 feet. The stream flows generally southwest passing into the northwest corner of Harrison County, Missouri just north of the community of Hatfield. The stream continues to the southwest entering Worth County and reaching its confluence with the East Fork just west of the city of Allendale. The confluence is at 40°29′38″N 94°18′45″W at an elevation of 932 feet.

A variant name was "Lots Creek". The creek has the name of Henry Lot, a pioneer citizen.

== See also ==
- List of rivers of Iowa
- List of rivers of Missouri
