= Dell Lott Hollow =

Canyon in Sevier County, Utah

Coordinates: 38°36′21″N 112°13′40″W

Dell Lott Hollow is a canyon, mostly within the Fishlake National Forest, on the southeast edge of the Pavant Range in southwest Sevier County, Utah, United States.

Dell Lott Hollow has the name of Dell Lott, a local lumberman.

== See also ==
- List of canyons and gorges in Utah
