= Giuseppe De Fabris =

Italian sculptor

Giuseppe De Fabris (1790 — 1860) was an Italian sculptor of the Neoclassic style.

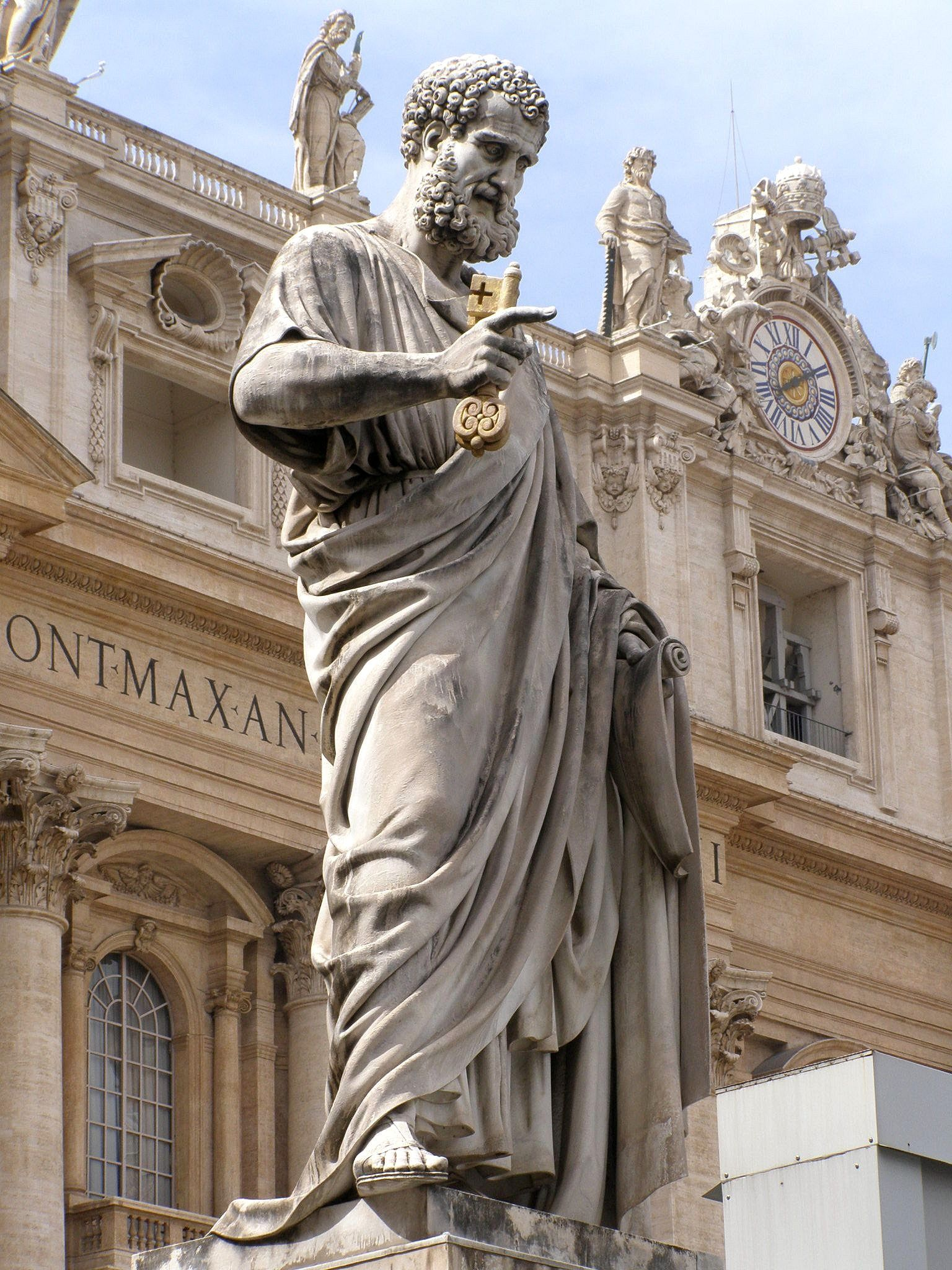
Statue of St Peter, outside the Basilica of St Peter

== Biography ==
He was born in Nove in the province of Vicenza. His father was a director of a factory of ceramic decoration. He moved to Rome as a young man, and was patronized by Pope Gregory XVI. He was named director of the musei pontifici.

Among his major works in Rome are:

- Monuments and busts in the Sala Maggiore, Protomoteca Capitolina
- Monument to Francesco Guglielmi, church of Santi Ambrogio e Carlo al Corso
- Monument to Prassede Tomati Robilant, church of Sant'Andrea della Valle
- Monument to cardinal Francesco Fontana, church of Santi Biagio and Carlo ai Catinari
- Monument to Cardinal Placido Zurla, church of San Gregorio al Celio
- Busto di Leone XII, church of Santa Maria in Cosmedin
- Monument to Antonio Maria Traversi, Basilica of Santa Maria Maggiore
- Monument to Torquato Tasso, church of Sant'Onofrio
- Monument to Giuseppe Vitelli, church of San Rocco all'Augusteo
- Bust of Pope Leo XII, Cloister of San Cosimato
- Bust of Raphael; Self-portrait; Bust of Pope Gregory XVI, Pantheon, Congregazione dei Virtuosi
