= Lotts Creek Township, Kossuth County, Iowa =

Township in Kossuth County, Iowa, U.S.

Coordinates: 43.1258°N 94.3836°W

Lotts Creek Township is a township in Kossuth County, Iowa, United States.

== History ==
Lotts Creek Township (formerly Lott's Creek with apostrophe s) was organized in 1873. Lotts Creek Township takes its name from the Lotts Creek, which in turn was named for Henry Lott, the figure made notorious for murdering Chief Sintominadutah and 8 members of Sintominadutah's family. Resulting in retaliation by other Dakota members at Spirit Lake Iowa where 32 settlers were also murdered. in the Spirit Lake Massacre.
