= Lotter (surname) =

Lötter was the last name of a family of German printers, intimately connected with the Reformation.

The surname may also refer to:

- Albert Lotter, editor of Wrapped magazine
- Bebe Lotter, fictional character played by Donna Mills in the 1972 television film Rolling Man
- Eberhardine Christiane Lotter (born Kinckelin), adventurous traveler (see K. Beiergrosslein and J. Lotterer 2019) who traveled from Herrenberg (South Germany) to Charlestown on her own in 1786 and authored a diary of her travels
- Gert Lotter (born 1993), Namibian cricketer and rugby union player
- Hans Lotter (1917–2008), highly decorated Oberleutnant in the Luftwaffe during World War II
- Hieronymus Lotter (1497–1580), Renaissance builder and architect (see Augustusburg Hunting Lodge and Moritzbastei) who lived and died in Geyer, Germany, and former mayor of Leipzig, Germany
- Johann Lotter, violinist on the albums Victoria Day (2009) and The Waiting (2010)
- Johannes Lötter, (1875–1901) Boer commandant in the Boer War
- John Lotter (born 1971), American convicted murderer and character in the 1999 film Boys Don't Cry
- Madelein Lotter (born 1971), former South Africa cricketer
- Marc Lotter (born 1970), American Republican political advisor
- Marius Lotter (born 1963), founder of Gaswise, the first computerized fuel pump management system running on the AT computer
- Markus Lotter (born 1970), German football coach and a former player
- Matthias Lötter (1696-1752), master Gold- and Silversmith at the Cape from Augsburg
- Melchior Lotter (born 15th century), German printer and founder of Lotter family
- Sabina Lotter (1620–1676), wife of Johannes Koch von Gailenbach
- Shelley Lotter, co-founder of the Yale University Redhot & Blue (musical group) in 1977
- Stefan Lotter (born 1994), South African actor and media personality
- Tobias Conrad Lotter (1717-1777), engraver, cartographer and publisher, son-in-law of German map publisher Matthäus Seutter

== Other ==
- Lotter P. Edwin Edin, contestant on the Malaysian reality television show Akademi Fantasia

== See also ==
- Lotter (disambiguation)
- Lot (disambiguation)
- Lotten
