= Propsteikirche, Leipzig =

Coordinates: 51°20′07″N 12°22′24″E

Propsteikirche
- Propsteikirche St. Trinitatis Leipzig
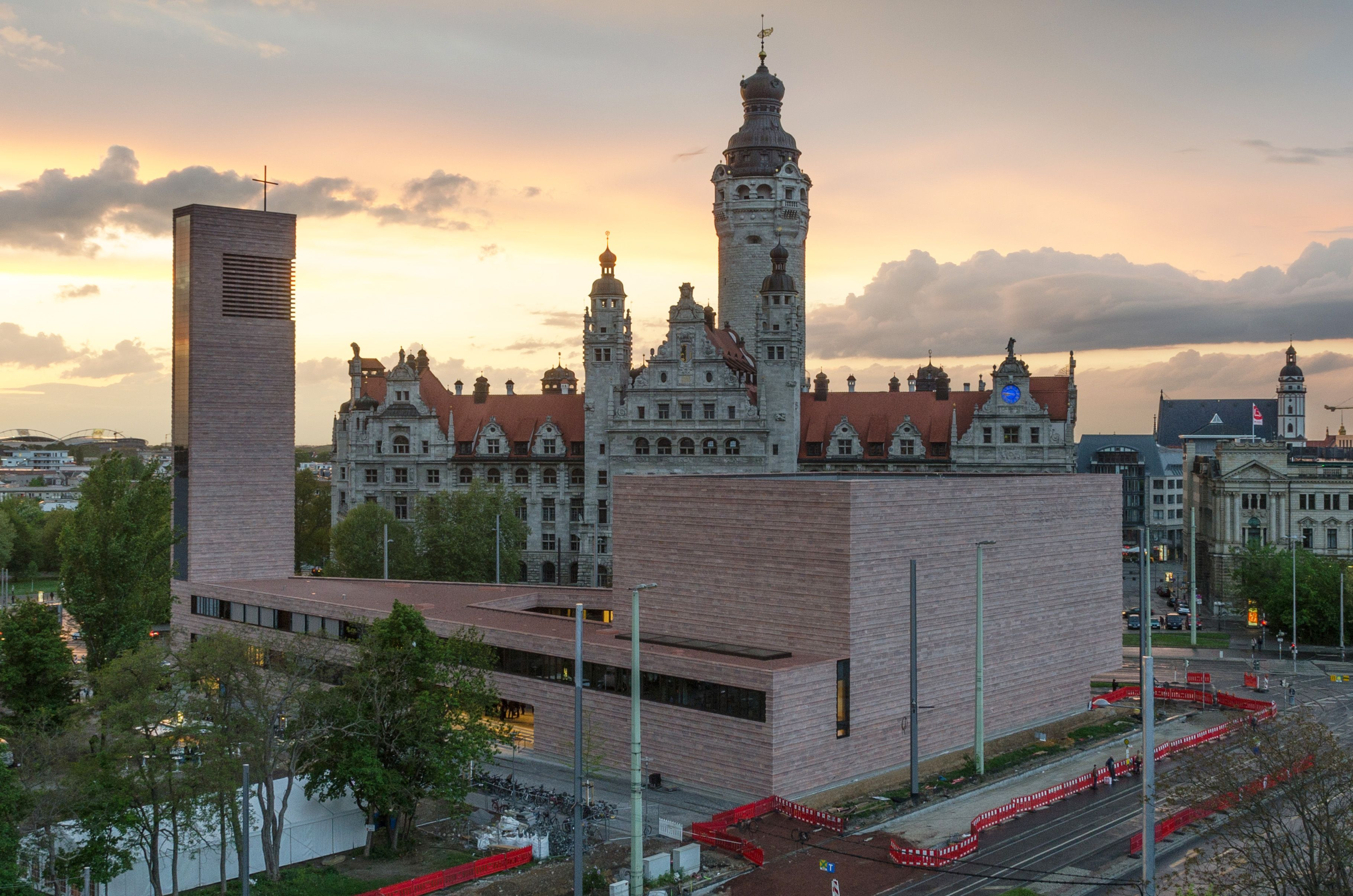
- Propsteikirche
- Location: Leipzig, Saxony
- Country: Germany
- Denomination: Catholic
- Website: www.propstei-leipzig.de

History
- Status: Church
- Dedication: Trinity
- Consecrated: 9 May 2015

Architecture
- Functional status: Parish church
- Architect: Schulz und Schulz

Administration
- Diocese: Diocese of Dresden-Meißen
- Deanery: Leipzig

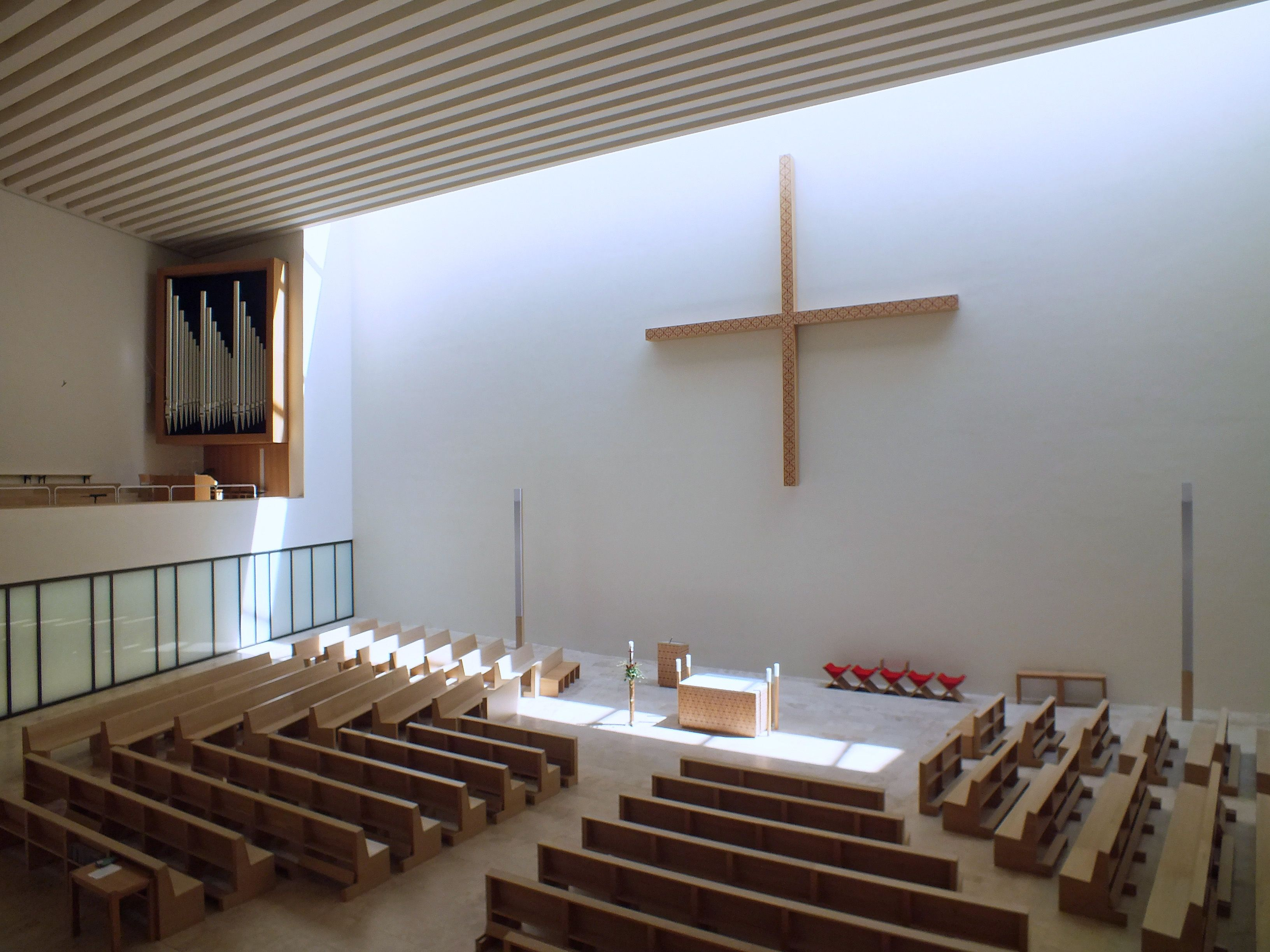
Interior

The Propsteikirche St. Trinitatis (German pronunciation: [pʁoːpsˈtaɪkɪʁçə zaŋkt tʁiniˈtaːtɪs], Provost Church of the Holy Trinity) in Leipzig, Saxony, Germany, is a Catholic church in the city centre, at the southwestern corner of the Inner City Ring Road, opened in 2015. The parish is part of the deanery of Leipzig in the Diocese of Dresden-Meißen. The official name of the church is Propsteikirche St. Trinitatis Leipzig. It is the largest church built in the new states of Germany since reunification.

This is the third church to have been named Trinitatiskirche in Leipzig. The first was built in the centre in 1847, but was destroyed in World War II. The East German government permitted a new building to be erected, but only in a suburb. An "unremarkable functional building" was designed by the Bauakademie der DDR (‘Building Academy of the German Democratic Republic’) and completed in 1982. It showed severe structural deficiencies after a few years, due to problems with the foundations. The latest church returned the parish to the city centre, close to the location of the first church.

The architects Schulz und Schulz, who won a competition for the new building, were awarded a prize for the "Religious building of the year" at the World Architecture Festival 2016. The building complex is based on a triangle. In the east is the church, with an adjacent chapel and the sacristy. In the west are a large hall for the congregation and parish offices, with living quarters for priests and a guest apartment on an upper floor. A 50 m (164 ft) bell tower marks the western tip of the triangle.

The church window to the north was designed by Falk Haberkorn from Leipzig. It contains texts from the Old Testament and the New Testament, showing different sections depending on the lighting and time of day. The windows were manufactured by the Derix company.

== Literature ==
- Neue Propsteikirche Leipzig St. Trinitatis. Ein LVZ-Extra zur Weihe. Leipziger Volkszeitung, 9 May 2015.
- Arnold Bartetzky: Die neue Leipziger Propsteikirche St. Trinitatis. in: Sächsische Heimatblätter 61 (2015) 2, pp. 128–132
- Andreas Nentwich: Verzicht auf Grös?. In Sonntag, Baden-Dättwil (Switzerland) 2015, No. 28, p. 17f.
