= Augustusburg Castle =

Augustusburg Castle may refer to:

- Augustusburg Hunting Lodge, a castle built from 1568 to 1572 near Chemnitz, Saxony, Germany.
- Augustusburg and Falkenlust Palaces, Brühl, a complex of palaces and a World Heritage Site built in the early 18th century in Brühl, North Rhine-Westphalia, Germany.
