= Alte Waage (Leipzig) =

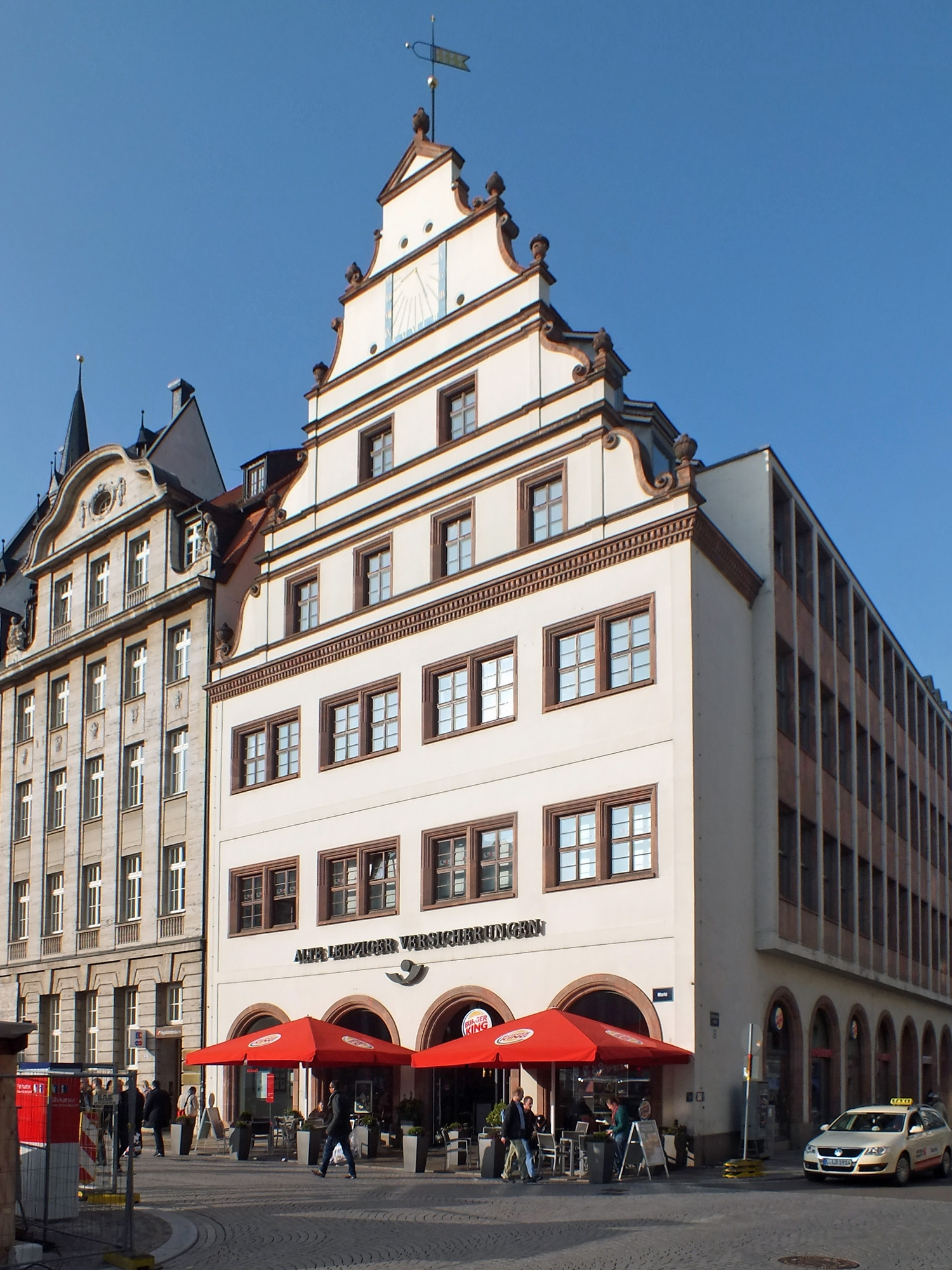
- The 1963/64 modernized building
- Interactive map of the Alte Waage area

General information
- Type: Public Weigh House
- Architectural style: Saxon Renaissance
- Location: Markt 4, Leipzig, Germany
- Coordinates: 51.341245°N 12.374956°E
- Completed: 1555
- Renovated: 1963-1964
- Owner: insurance company Alte Leipziger

Design and construction
- Architects: Hieronymus Lotter (1555), Wolfgang Müller (1963-1964)

The Alte Waage, in English: Old Weigh House, is a building that stands on the north side of the Markt of the German city of Leipzig, on the corner with Katharinenstrasse. Originally, it was built in 1555 under the direction of the mayor and builder Hieronymus Lotter (1497–1580) and the executive master builder Paul Speck († 1557). It is an example of the Saxon Renaissance.

== History ==
The so-called saffron flakes were previously found in this place. Behind the four-tier gable facing the market with sundial at the top and stair tower in front, the house had two upper floors and attic and two floors above the cellar and the ground floor.

The Alte Waage was the center of the Leipzig Trade Fair, which was then operated as a goods fair with direct sales. Here all goods had to be weighed, after which the tariff was collected, which the city shared with the territorial lord. The necessary facilities and rooms were located on the ground floor. The city treasury received more than a quarter of its total annual income through the public weigh house.

The basement housed the council bar and the first floor housed the men's dining room. From 1558 to 1638 the escort was based here, responsible for road safety in exchange for an escort fee. From 1590 the building also housed the post office of the Leipzig council with the express room. From 1661 to 1712 the Electorate of Saxony post office of Leipzig was located here, which was then moved to the Leipzig Amtshof (office building) on the St. Thomas Church Square (Thomaskirchhof).

In 1820 the weighing business was moved to the front of the city centre. Opposite the Halle Gate, to the north, a new public weighbridge building and a customs office were built (both no longer preserved). That's why the building in the city center was now called Alte Waage (Old Weigh House). It was now used as a commercial building, but until 1862 the Leipzig city guard (Leipziger Kommunalgarde) also had a permanent office there. When the gable was renovated, the stair tower was removed in 1861.

In 1917 the new office of the Leipzig Fair (Leipziger Messeamt) moved into the building, and remained there until 1943. Furthermore, the "Mitteldeutsche Rundfunk AG - Society for entertainment and education" (MIRAG) was temporarily established in some rooms. On 1 March 1924, radio stations in Germany began broadcasting with the transmitting antenna on the New Johannishopital in Leipzig.

On 4 December 1943 an air raid completely destroyed the building. After the rubble was removed, the property remained undeveloped for a few years. The central area of the building was occupied by temporary buildings for the fair office and later for a travel agency. In 1963/1964 a new building was built based on the design of the Leipzig architect Wolfgang Müller (1932–1992). The entire structure, including the facade facing Katharinenstrasse, is a new modern building. Only the south gable after the market was modeled on the historic Renaissance building, although as before without a stair tower.

From the beginning of 1965 the building was used by the GDR travel agency. In 1994 it was acquired by the insurance company Alte Leipziger, which has used it as the location of its regional headquarters since 1996. A chain of fast food restaurants operates on the ground floor .

== Gallery ==
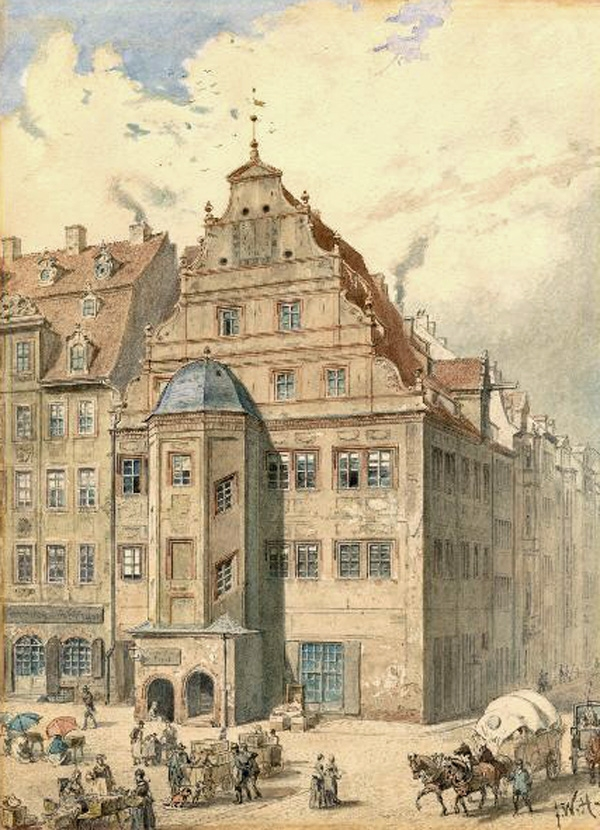
Alte Waage around 1850

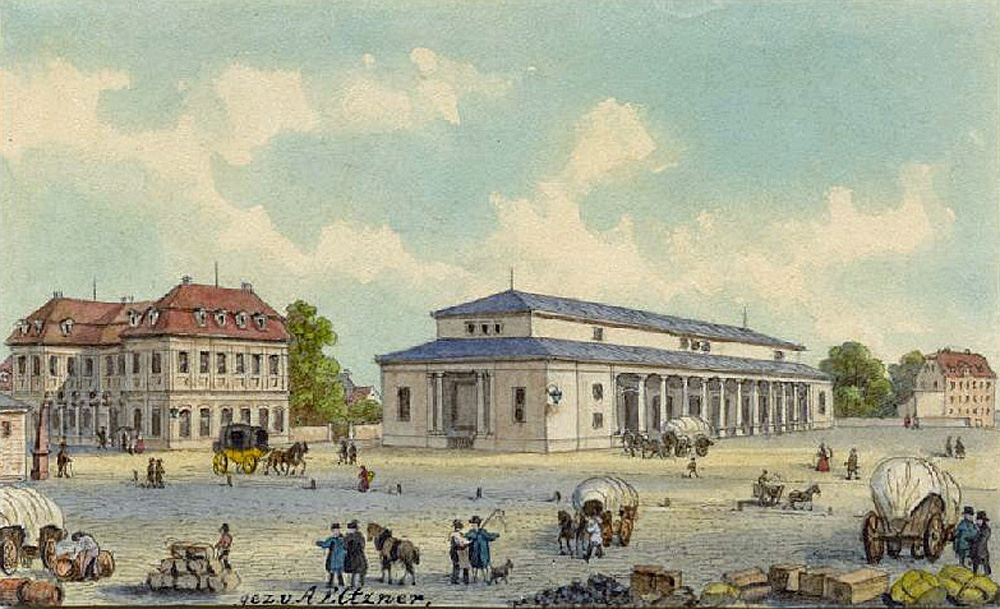
Hallisches Tor (1846) with the customs office (left) and the new weigh house (right)

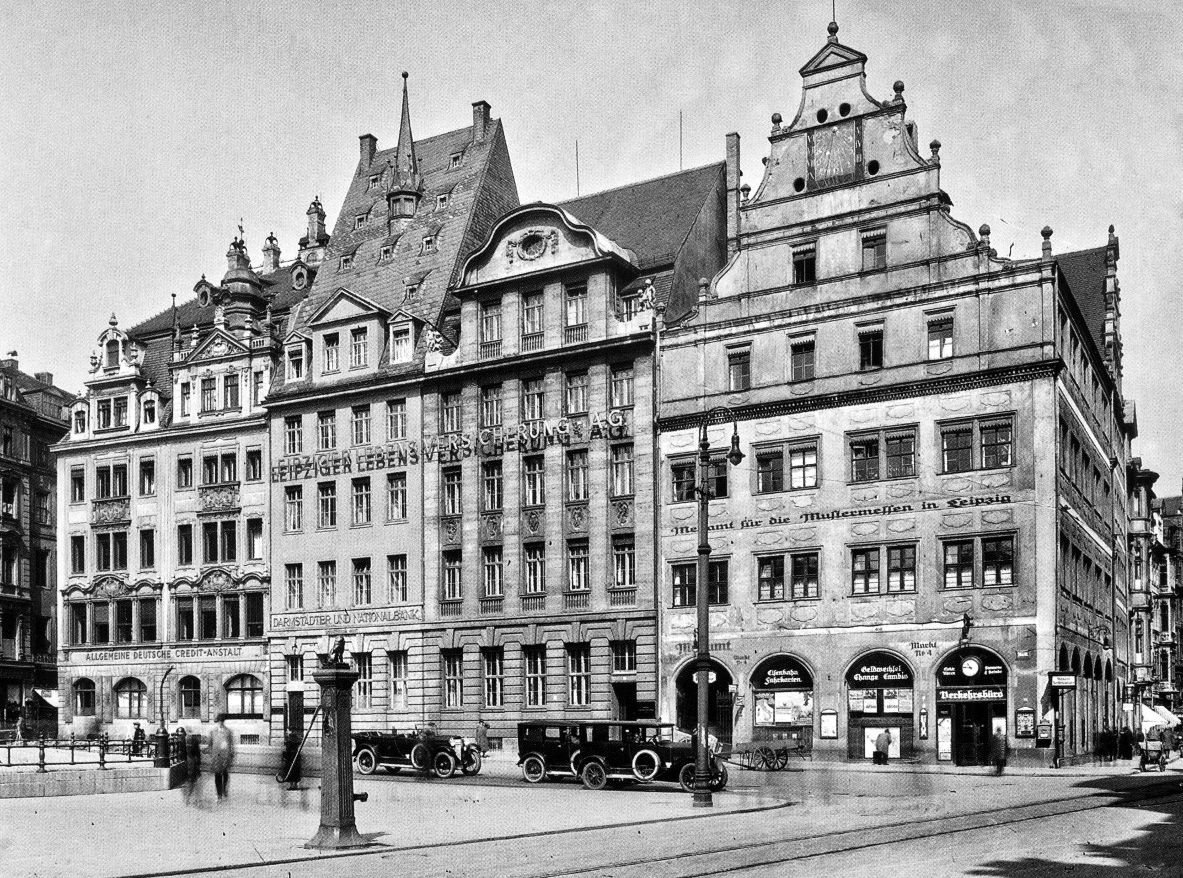
Alte Waage around 1925

== See also ==
- Architecture of Leipzig - Renaissance

== Bibliography ==
- Cornelius Gurlitt (1896). Meinhold (ed.). Stadt Leipzig (II.Theil), Beschreibende Darstellung der älteren Bau- und Kunstdenkmäler des Königreichs Sachsen (in German). Dresden. pp. 128–377.
