= Loston (disambiguation) =

Loston (born 1982) is an Australian music producer and graphic designer.

Loston may also refer to:

- Adena Williams Loston (born 1952), an American educator
- Craig Loston (born 1989), an American football player
- Loston Harris, an American jazz musician
- Loston Wallace (born 1970), an American comic book artist

== See also ==
- Losten
