= Losten =

Losten is a surname. Notable people with the surname include:

- Basil H. Losten (1930–2024), American Catholic bishop
- Lotta Losten (born 1981), Swedish actress, designer, and photographer

== See also ==
- Loston (disambiguation)
- Lotten
