= Rudolf Skoda =

German architect

- Felix Rudolf Skoda
- Born: September 26, 1931; Leipzig, Germany
- Died: April 2, 2015 (aged 83); Leipzig, Germany
- Education: Hochschule für Architektur und Bauwesen Weimar
- Occupation: Architect
- Relatives: Felix Skoda (father)
- Practice: Skoda & Partner
- Projects: Neues Gewandhaus Leipzig

Felix Rudolf Skoda (26 September 1931 – 2 April 2015) was a German architect and academic teacher. He was chief architect for the Neue Gewandhaus in Leipzig.

== Life ==
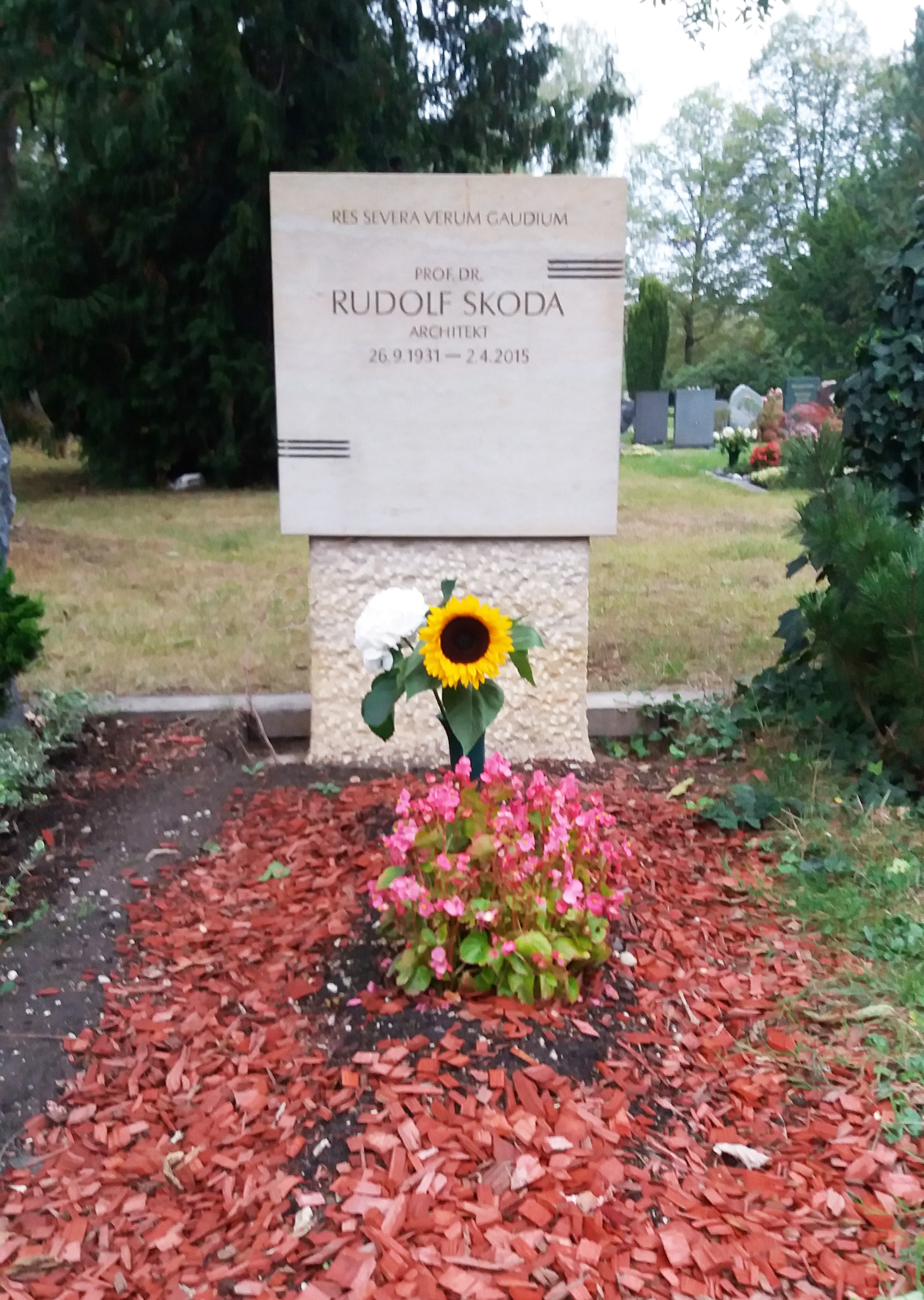
Rudolf Skoda's grave (2016)

Born in Leipzig, Skoda was the son of the painter and graphic artist Felix Skoda. After taking his Abitur at the Humboldt-Gymnasium Leipzig in 1950, he completed a two-year apprenticeship as a bricklayer. From 1952 to 1957, he studied architecture at the Hochschule für Architektur und Bauwesen Weimar. He was then a research assistant at the universities in Weimar and Cottbus. He was awarded a Dr.-Ing. in 1968 in Weimar with the thesis Wohnhäuser und Wohnverhältnisse der Stadtarmut (Dwellings and Housing Conditions of the Urban Poor). In 1986, he completed his Habilitation.

From 1960 to 1975, he worked as a design architect in Leipzig's project planning offices, designing several buildings that were characteristic of Leipzig's cityscape. In 1976, he became chief architect at the construction staff of the Rat des Bezirkes of Leipzig. From 1977, he was also chief architect for the construction of the New Gewandhaus. He held both positions until 1981. The Gewandhaus building is considered Skoda's main work; it was the only purely new concert hall building in the history of the GDR. The West German trade press also praised the design with its richness of form as extraordinary for the GDR, "in which - in view of the dreary monotony of mass-produced buildings made of commonplace assembly parts - architecture was almost thought to have been forgotten" (Bauwelt).

In 2011, it became known that during the GDR period Skoda had been a Begrüßungsgeld unofficial collaborator (IM) of the Ministry for State Security. By his own admission, he had informed West German interlocutors of his status. This is confirmed in a letter to the editor by Manfred Sack. However, his Stasi file also contains activities in the private sphere.

After having already taught as an honorary lecturer at the Technische Hochschule Leipzig, he was appointed full professor for residential and social buildings there in 1981. In numerous publications, he devoted himself in particular to the subject of concert hall construction. He had been a member of the Freie Akademie der Künste Hamburg since the mid-1980s. In 1991, he founded the architectural partnership Skoda & Partner. From 2001 onward, he was mainly active as an expert in competitions as well as in an advisory and publishing capacity.

Skoda died in Leipzig at the age of 83 and was buried at the South Cemetery Leipzig.

== Work ==
=== Buildings ===
- 1965: Building of the Leipziger Messeamt in Markt (with Rudolf Rohrer and Ulrich Quester), demolished in 2001.
- 1968/1969: Operating building of the VEB Robotron in der Gerberstraße (with Ulrich Quester), demolished in 2013.
- 1969–1972: Lecture hall complex of the Karl-Marx-Universität Leipzig (with Ulrich Quester), redeveloped in 2007/08.
- 1976–1981: Neues Gewandhaus Leipzig (with Eberhard Göschel, Volker Sieg and Winfried Sziegoleit).
- 1993/1994: Lindenau Office and Service Centre in Lützner Straße
- 1994–1996: Conversion and basic renovation of the Hochschule für Musik und Theater Leipzig.
- 1996: Conversion of the Small Hall of the Gewandhaus into the Mendelssohn Hall.
- 1998: Residence Inselstraße 13/15.
Buildings by Rudolf Skoda

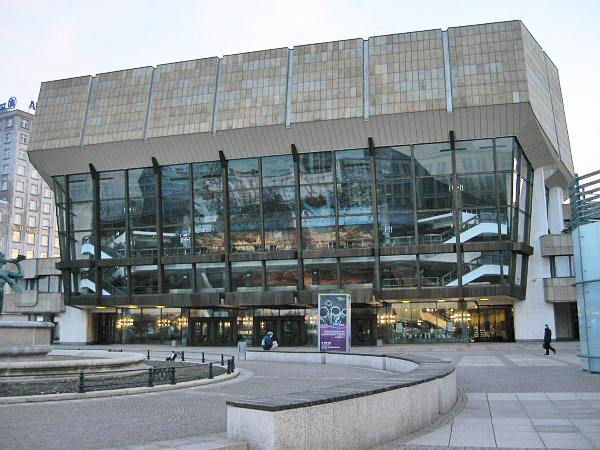
The Neue Gewandhaus in Leipzig on Augustusplatz (2004)

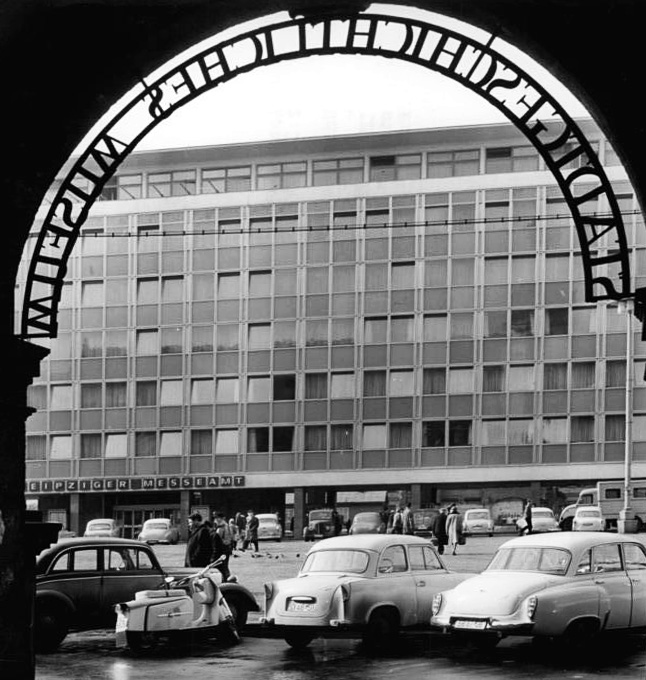
Trade Fair Office Building, 1966, of the Stadtgeschichtliches Museum Leipzig.

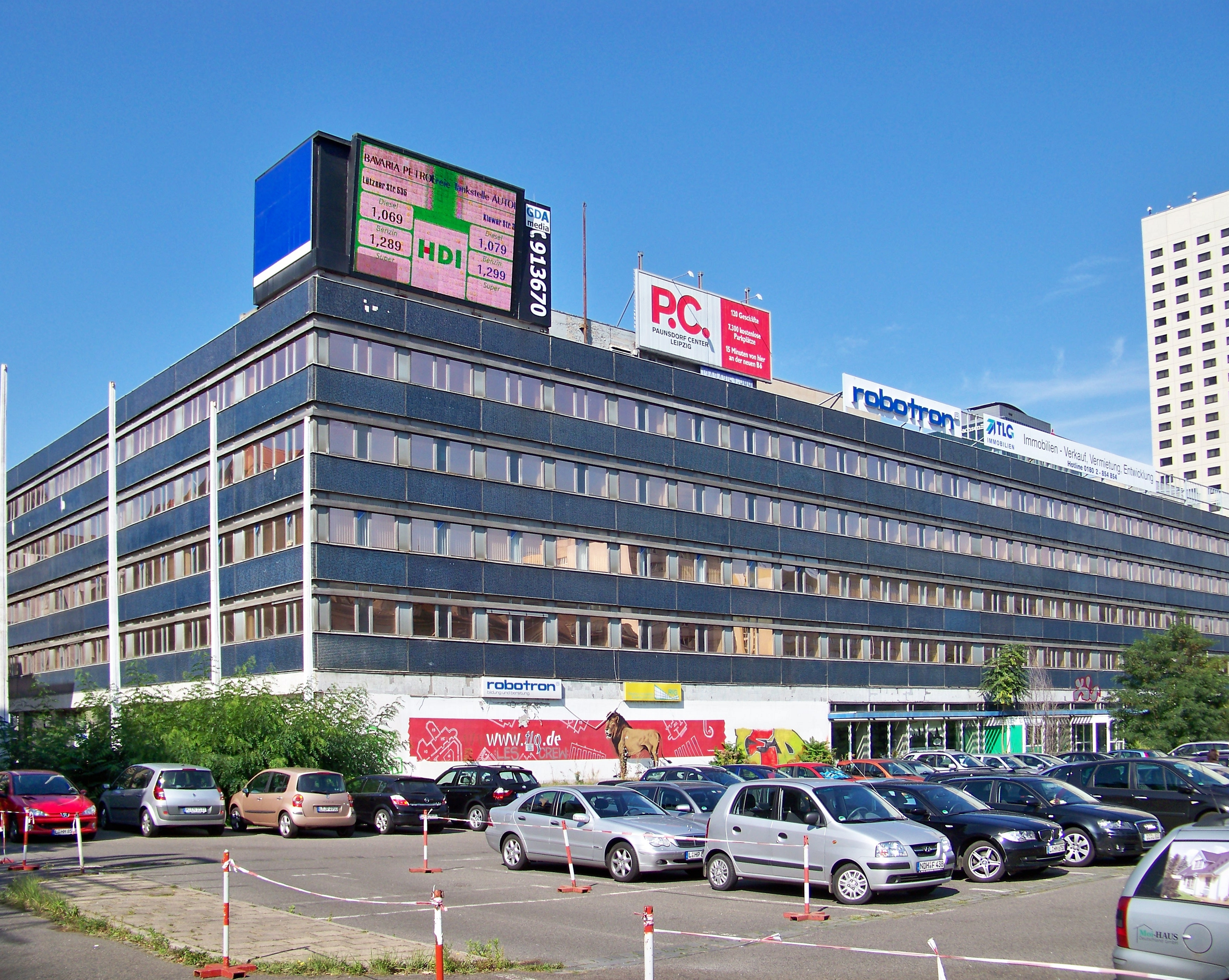
Robotron building Leipzig (2009).

=== Publications ===
- Das Voigtland. Wohnhäuser und Wohnverhältnisse der Stadtarmut in der Rosenthaler Vorstadt von Berlin 1750–1850. Kulturbund, Berlin 1985.
- Neues Gewandhaus Leipzig. Baugeschichte und Gegenwart eines Konzertgebäudes. Verlag für Bauwesen, Berlin 1985.
- Die bauliche Entwicklung des Gewandhauses in Leipzig als Spiegelbild internationaler Entwicklungen und Tendenzen im Konzertsaalbau. 1986. (Habilitationsschrift)
- Hieronymus Lotter. "Es hat mich Kurfürst Moritz zu einem Baumeister allhier gemacht", in: Vera Hauschild (Ed.), Die großen Leipziger, Insel Verlag Frankfurt am Main / Leipzig 1996, ISBN 3-458-16780-3, pp. 35–46.
- Die Leipziger Gewandhausbauten. Konzertgebäude im internationalen Vergleich. Verlag für Bauwesen, Berlin 2001, ISBN 978-3-345-00781-1.

== Awards ==
- 1971: Kunstpreis der Stadt Leipzig.
- 1981: Nationalpreis der DDR II. Klasse.
- 1982: Preis für Städtebau und Architektur des Bezirkes Leipzig.
- 1986: Member of the Freie Akademie der Künste Hamburg (Sektion Baukunst) Hamburg.
