= Hieronymus Lotter =

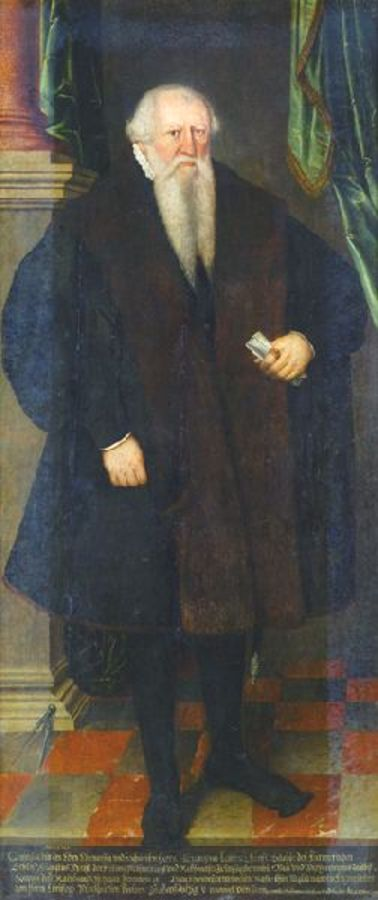
Hieronymus Lotter in the costume of a Leipzig councilman (oil on canvas, 1569)

Hieronymus Lotter (around 1497 in Nuremberg-22 July 1580 in Geyer / Ore Mountains) was a merchant and several times mayor of Leipzig, construction manager for important sovereign building projects in Saxony and the driving force behind extensive building measures by the municipal council in Leipzig. Lotter was the Master builder of Maurice, Elector of Saxony, under the direction of the principal toolmaster and master builder Caspar Vogt von Wierandt († 1560). According to earlier research, he was considered an important architect of the Renaissance; today its role is seen in a more differentiated way and above all its organizational function is emphasized.

== Life and work ==
As mayor, he was probably one of the driving forces behind the conversion of the old town hall in Leipzig (1556–57) into one of the most important buildings of the German Renaissance, as well as other urban buildings, such as Alte Waage (Weigh house) (1555) in Leipzig and the town hall in Pegau (from 1559). He was also in sovereign service as a construction manager (master builder) on the Leipzig city fortifications (from 1551), of which only the Moritzbastei has survived to this day. And he was the first master builder of Augustusburg Castle near Chemnitz (from 1568 until January 1572).

The building design and execution of the buildings created in connection with Lotter can be attributed to various important architects and master craftsmen; so the design of the Leipzig city fortifications by the Electoral Saxon armory master and fortification engineer Caspar Vogt von Wierandt and details by the master stonemason Paul Speck. The original design model for the Augustusburg was sent to Lotter from Dresden, which he modified with his own ideas. Erhard van der Meer also made a name for himself at the Augustusburg with designs for the palace chapel.

After Lotter had enjoyed the favor of Elector Maurice of Saxony at a young age and acquired considerable wealth as a merchant (mining, loan, trade), he died in disgrace and in much simpler circumstances. At first he had also had the favor of Maurice's successor, Augustus, Elector of Saxony. Nevertheless, bad speculations led to his economic ruin and finally to his dismissal.

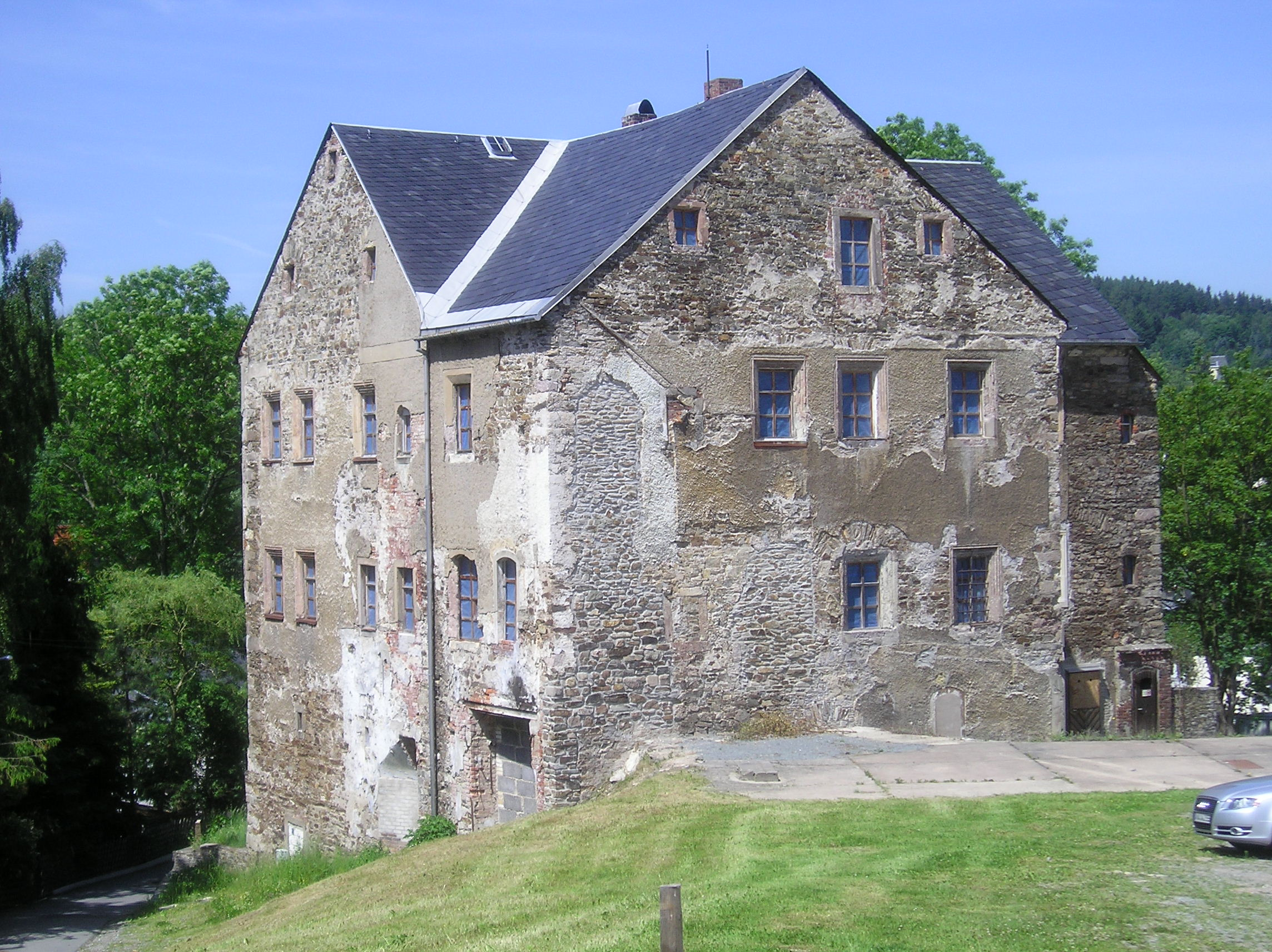
Lotterhof from the east (2011)

His death house in Geyer (Lotterhof, 1566) experienced various changes of ownership and has served as a factory since the 19th century, in which washboards and small pieces of furniture were manufactured. What is particularly noteworthy about the listed building is the colored wooden coffered ceiling from the 17th century. The building, which has been vacant since 1990, received a new roof after 1990, but was otherwise in danger of falling into ruin. A local association is taking care of the restoration and has set up a meeting place in the vaulted rooms. In 2020, the association has completed the exterior renovation of the listed building.

== Posthumous honors ==
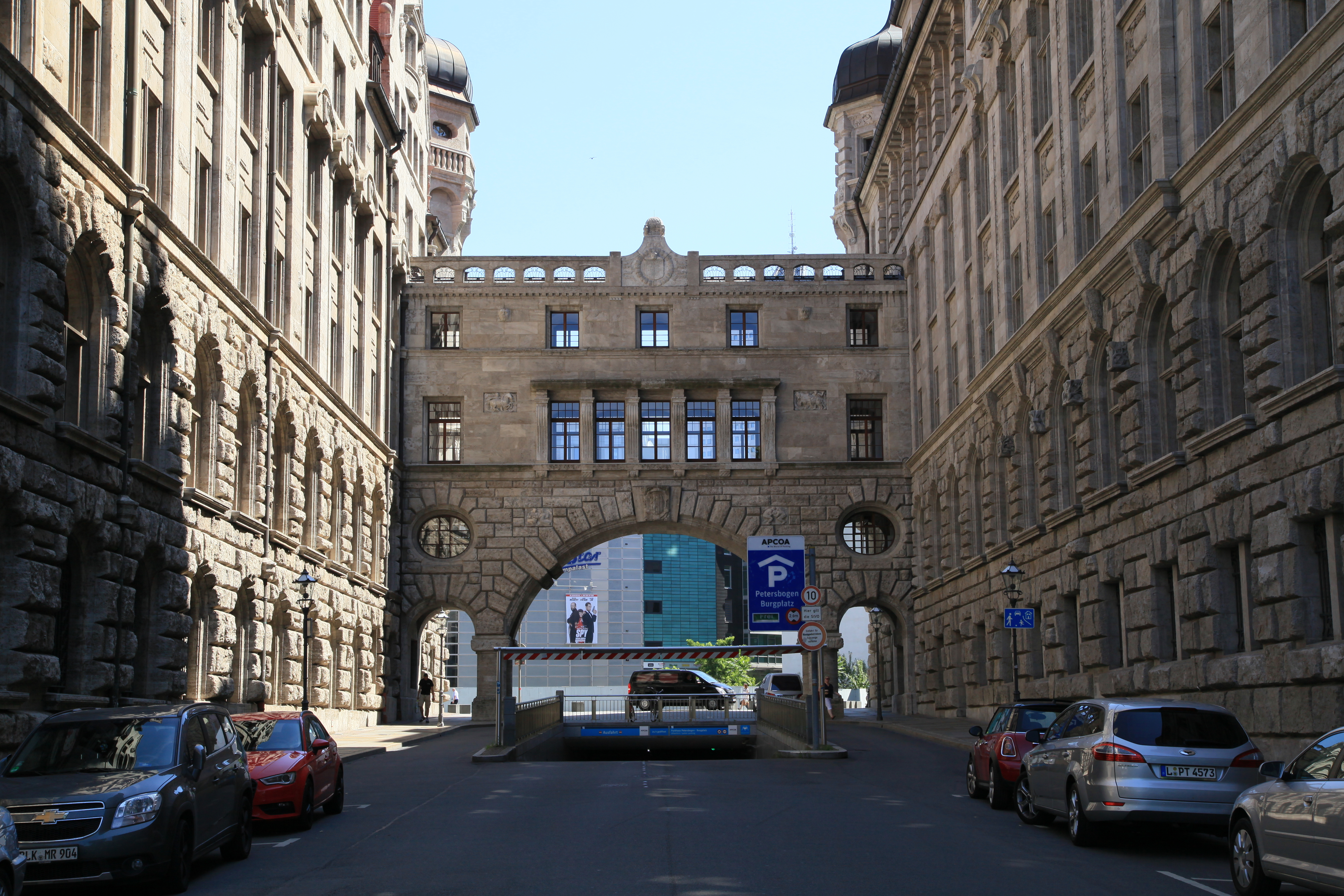
Lotterstraße in Leipzig

The promotion company of Leipzig's City History Museum, Hieronymus-Lotter-Gesellschaft, named itself after the builder of the Old Town Hall because the museum has its headquarters there since 1909.

The Hieronymus-Lotter-Preis für Denkmalschutz (Translation: Hieronymus Lotter Prize for Monument Protection) is an award named after Hieronymus Lotter, which the Kulturstiftung Leipzig awards for the exemplary repair or restoration of cultural monuments in the city of Leipzig.

In Leipzig and Augustusburg streets are named after Hieronymus Lotter. Lotterstraße in Leipzig has borne this name since 1898 and is located between the new town hall and its later extension, the Stadthaus. The Pleissenburg, which stood on the plot of the new town hall before, was rebuilt as a fortification in 1549 by Hieronymus Lotter.

== See also ==
- Architecture of Leipzig - Renaissance

== Literature ==
=== Sources ===
- Hieronymus Lotter, copy of the document in the tower hood of the old town hall (1573), in: Axel Frey / Bernd Weinkauf (ed.), Leipzig als ein Pleißathen. Eine geistesgeschichtliche Ortsbestimmung, Reclam Verlag, Leipzig 1995, ISBN 3-379-01526-1, p. 255f. (in German)

=== Non-fiction ===
- Entry Hieronymus Lotter in: Wolfgang Hocquél (2023). Architekturführer Leipzig. Von der Romanik bis zur Gegenwart (in German). Leipzig: Passage Verlag. p. 350-353. ISBN 978-3-95415-128-8.
- Wolfram Günther: Hieronymus Lotter – bedeutender Architekt der deutschen Renaissance oder Mythos der Kunstgeschichte? Hieronymus Lotter und der Bau des Alten Leipziger Rathauses. Books on Demand, Norderstedt 2009, ISBN 978-3-8370-8012-4, in German - Translation of the title: Hieronymus Lotter – Important Architect of the German Renaissance or Myth of Art History? Hieronymus Lotter and the construction of the old Leipzig town hall
- Wolfram Günther: Hieronymus Lotter. In: Arnold Bartetzky (Ed.): Die Baumeister der „deutschen Renaissance“. Ein Mythos der Kunstgeschichte? Sax-Verlag, Beucha 2004, ISBN 3-934544-52-5, pp. 73–110, in German - Translation of the title: The builders of the "German Renaissance". A myth of art history?
- Ringel, Sebastian (2015). Lotter, in: Leipzig! One Thousand Years of History. Leipzig: Author and Edition Leipzig in the Seemann Henschel GmbH & Co. KG. pp. 39–41. ISBN 978-3-361-00710-9.
- Rudolf Skoda: Hieronymus Lotter. "Es hat mich Kurfürst Moritz zu einem Baumeister allhier gemacht", in: Vera Hauschild (Ed.), Die großen Leipziger, Insel Verlag Frankfurt am Main / Leipzig 1996, ISBN 3-458-16780-3, pp. 35–46, in German - Translation of the title: "Hieronymus Lotter. Elector Maurice made me a master builder all here"
- Lutz Unbehaun: Hieronymus Lotter. Kurfürstlich-sächsischer Baumeister und Bürgermeister zu Leipzig. Seemann, Leipzig 1989, ISBN 3-363-00416-8, in German - Translation of the title: Hieronymus Lotter. Electoral Saxon master builder and mayor of Leipzig
- Lutz Unbehaun (1987). "Lotter, Hieronymus". Neue Deutsche Biographie (in German). Vol. 15. Berlin: Duncker & Humblot. pp. 245–246. (full text online).

=== Fiction ===
- Johannes Arnold: Hieronymus Lotter. Historischer Roman, Halle/Leipzig 1979. (Historical novel in German)
