= Lotten =

Lotten is a Norwegian, and Swedish feminine given name that is a short form of Charlotte or Lieselotte, an alternate form of Lotte, and that is also related to Lisa, Elisa and Elisabeth. Notable people with the name include the following:

== Given name ==
- Lotten Andersson (born 1950), Swedish swimmer
- Lotten von Plomgren (1831-1916) Swedish civil defence activist, one of the founders of Svenska kvinnoföreningen för fosterlandets försvar.
- Lotten Sjödén (born 1994), Swedish biathlete

== Nickname ==
- Lotten Edholm, nickname of Lovisa Christina Charlotta Edholm (1839 - 1930), Swedish composer and pioneer
- Lotten fra Hegra, nickname of Anne Margrethe Strømsheim, née Bang, (1914 – 2008), Norwegian resistance member
- Lotten von Düben, nickname of Carolina Charlotta Mariana von Düben, née von Bahr, (1828–1915) Swedish photographer
- Lotten von Kræmer, nickname of Charlotte Louise von Kræmer (1828 – 1912), Swedish baroness, writer, poet, philanthropist and women's rights activist
- Lotten Wennberg, nickname of Charlotta Christina Wennberg (1815 - 1864), Swedish philanthropist

== See also ==
- Losten (disambiguation)
- Lotte (name)
- Lotter (surname)
