= Moritzbastei =

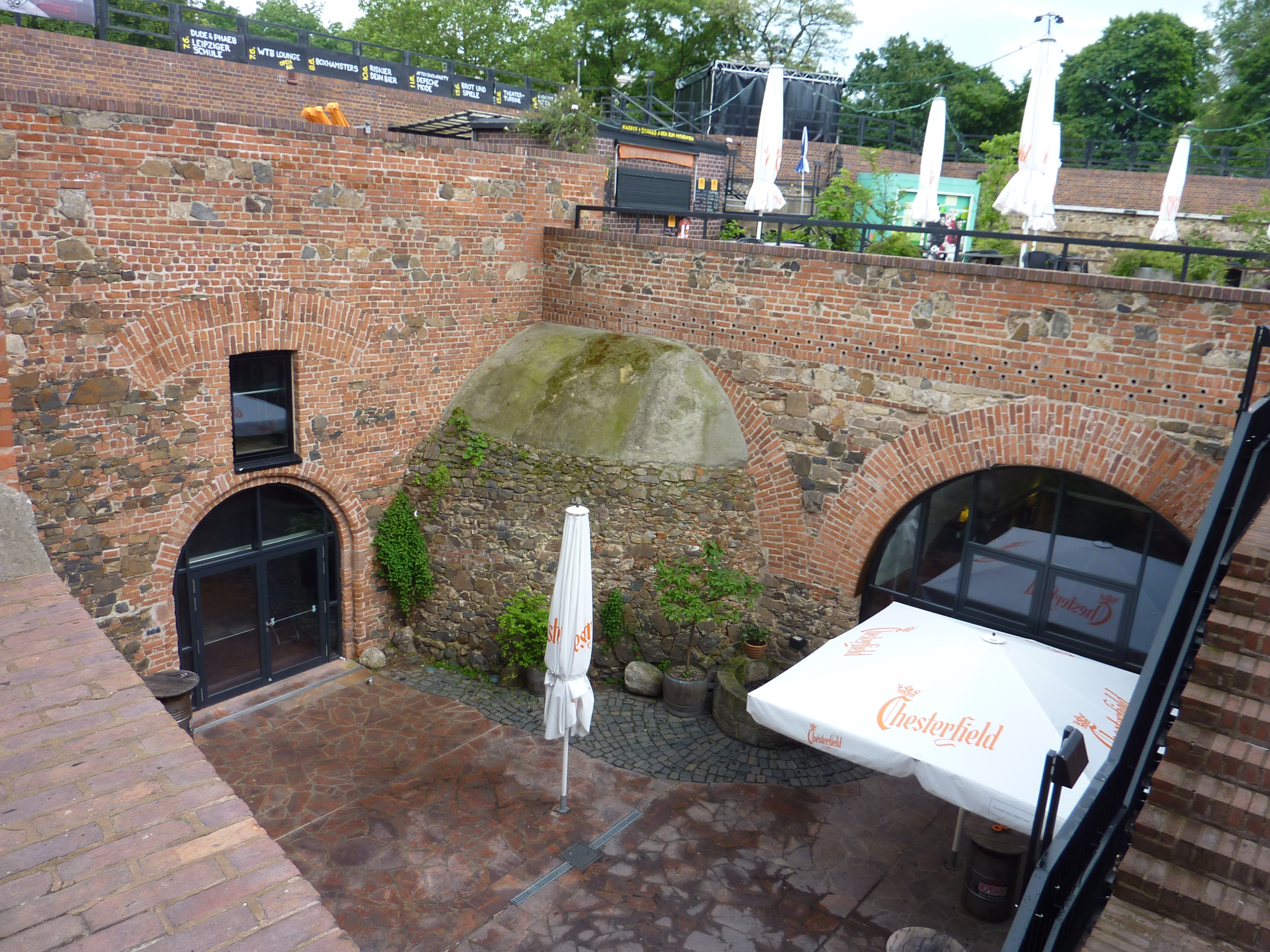
- Exterior of Moritzbastei (2013)
- Interactive map of the Moritzbastei area

General information
- Type: Bastion
- Architectural style: Renaissance
- Location: Kurt-Masur-Platz 1, Leipzig, Germany
- Coordinates: 51.3372°N 12.3792°E
- Construction started: 1551
- Completed: 1554
- Renovated: 1973-1982
- Client: City of Leipzig

Design and construction
- Architect: Hieronymus Lotter

Website
- https://www.moritzbastei.de/

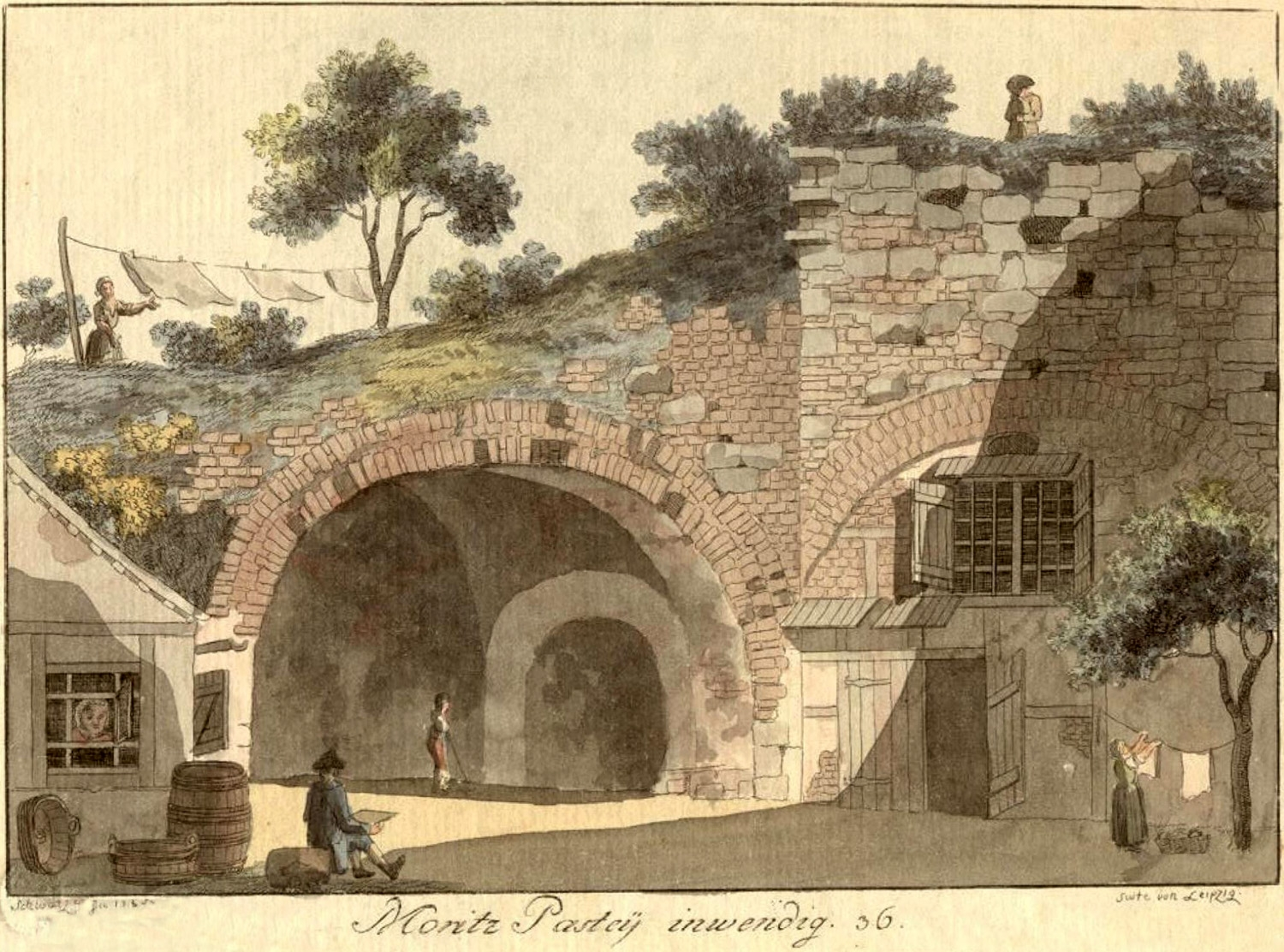
Moritzbastei in 1785

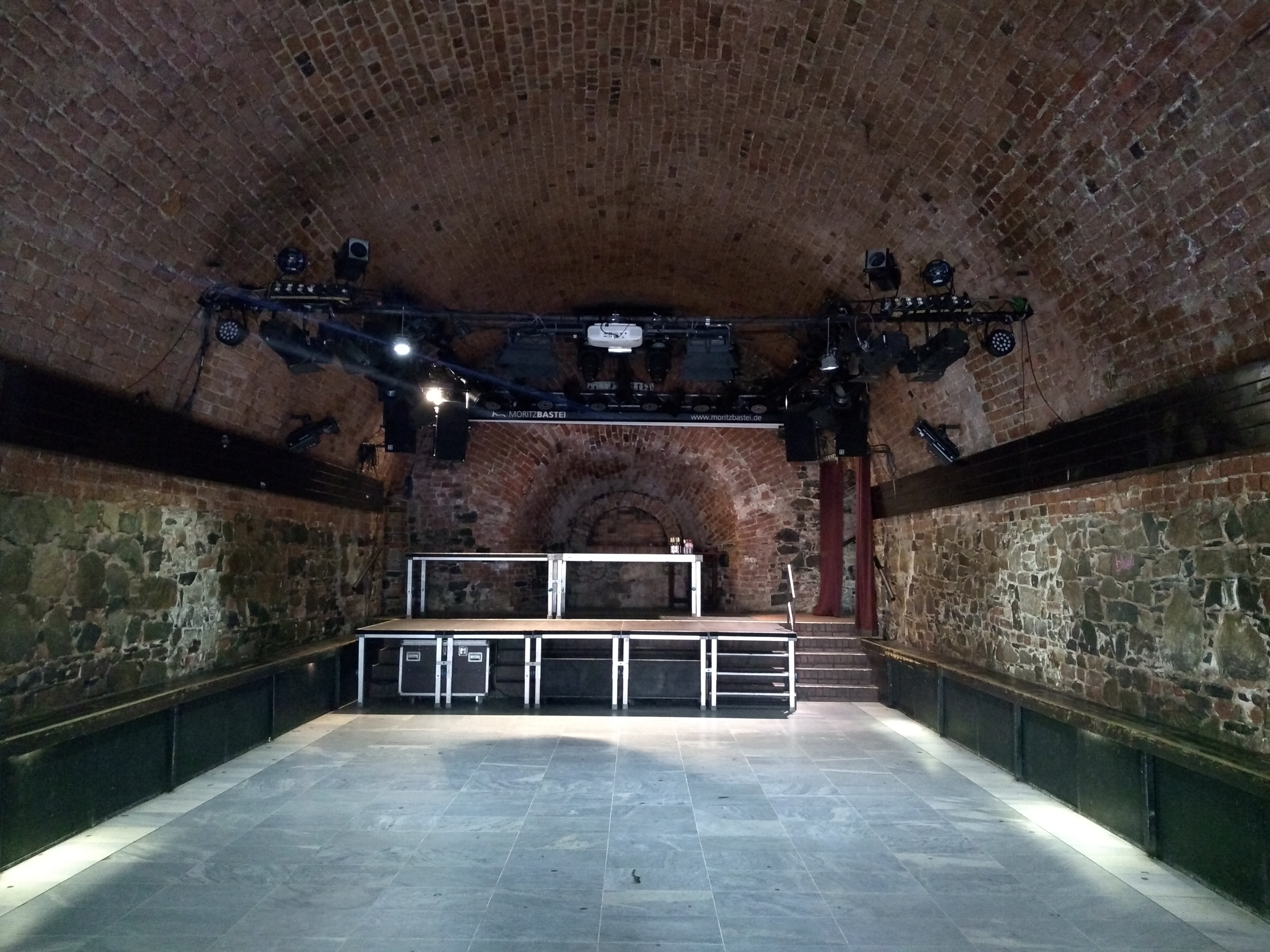
Interior of Moritzbastei (2024)

The Moritzbastei (translation: Moritz bastion) is the only remaining part of the ancient town fortifications of Leipzig. It is located on Kurt-Masur-Platz in the southeast of the city center. From 1979 to 1993 it was operated by Leipzig University as a student club. Since 1993 it has been managed as a cultural center by a private limited liability company on behalf of the Moritzbastei Leipzig Foundation.

== History ==
=== Rise and fall from 17th to 19th century ===
Between 1551 and 1554, what became known as the Moritzbastei was built as a bastion in Leipzig's walls under the supervision of the mayor Hieronymus Lotter. In 1547, Elector Moritz of Saxony directed the reconstruction of the town fortifications of Leipzig after they became largely destroyed during the Smalkaldic War between German Emperor Charles V and the Smalkaldic League. The bastion was named after Elector Moritz.

In 1642, during the Thirty Years War, the Moritzbastei was stormed. During the Seven Years' War (1756–1763), it lost its military function. Henceforth it served as a store for trade goods and workplace for a bell founder and a book printer.

From 1796 to 1834, Leipzig's first public school was built over the basement of the Moritzbastei by architect Johann Carl Friedrich Dauthe. It was the first school in Germany without confessional segregated classes.

=== Rise again in the 20th century ===
The school was destroyed in 1943 during World War II. Rubble and remains of the destroyed building were stuffed into the basement rooms of the bastion.

In 1973/1974 Leipzig University students discovered the remains of the Moritzbastei and persuaded the university and city authorities to allow it to be rebuilt as a student club. More than 30,000 students were engaged in the reconstruction of the bastion, among them the future Chancellor of Germany, Angela Merkel. From 1982, the Moritzbastei was the official student club of Leipzig University run by the Free German Youth as a venue for encounter and cultural events.

In 1993 the Moritzbastei ceased being part of Leipzig University and became a legally independent (commercial) foundation. It is still linked to the university through its board of directors which is headed by the Rector of Leipzig University. A second board member has to be an elected student representative.

Since 1993, the Moritzbastei has been run in the form of a GmbH under licence of the Moritzbastei foundation as a cultural centre. Its main purpose is to foster and sustain the student and academic culture in Leipzig.

The Board of Trustees, which oversees the work of the foundation without institutional subvention, consists of one representative of the city of Leipzig, the Free State of Saxony and the student body.

In recent years artists from all over the world have been guests of the Moritzbastei. The capacity is up to 1,200 persons.

== See also ==
- Architecture of Leipzig - Renaissance
