= Loston =

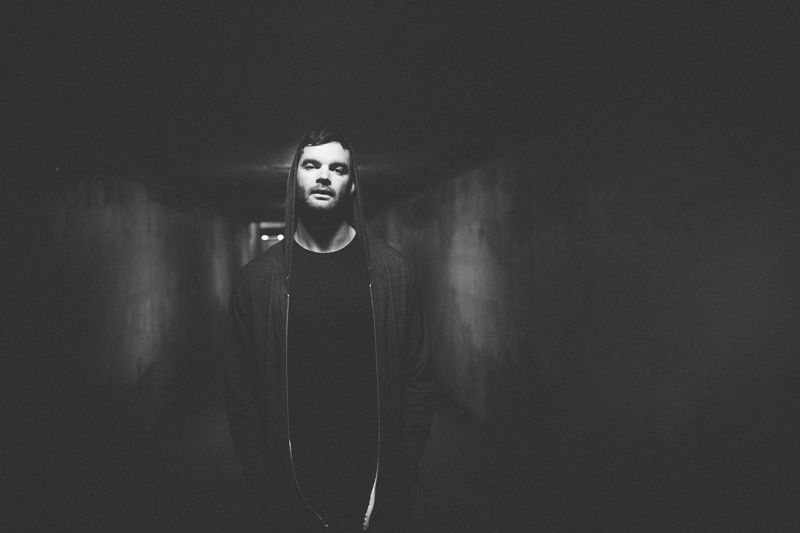
- Loston

Background information
- Born: Scott Mellor; 7 May 1982 (age 44)
- Origin: Perth, Western Australia, Australia
- Genres: Electronica; Downtempo; experimental
- Occupations: Producer; musician; designer
- Years active: 2012–present
- Website: www.soundcloud.com/loston

Scott Daniel Mellor (born 7 May 1982), known by his stage name Loston, is an Australian music producer and graphic designer. He rose to popularity in mid 2012, releasing reworks (bootlegs) of popular indie songs by James Blake, Banks, Sampha, and London Grammar. Loston grabbed the attention of many prominent blogs including Hypetrak and Earmilk, catapulting his remixes to the top of the Hype Machine charts on three occasions and chalking up millions of SoundCloud plays.

Loston released his first solo single since the Echoes EP (2018) called Wait in April 2021.

In January 2020 Loston collaborated with Slumberjack, HWLS, Twerl and ShockOne on the song Inferno which was released on bandcamp, all proceeds from the track were donated to the Australian Red Cross Bushfire appeal, in relation to the devastating bushfires at the time.

In 2018 he released his debut EP Echoes, a 6-song release featuring the songs Disappear, Solitaire, Holding Pattern, Junction and a cover of Tears for Fears "Everybody Wants to Rule the World.

Loston has produced for Nicole Millar (vocalist on Peking Duk song High), on the song "Cover Me", Which was released on her debut EP 'Tremble' through Universal on 5 February 2016. He has also been linked to Bay area rapper 100s and Queens NY rapper Bryant Dope.

Loston released a collaborative track with friend Ta-ku in April 2015 entitled "No Reason", which featured vocals from the song Count the Saints by Foxes.

Loston featured on Dim Mak Records' New Noize Vol 5 CD in 2013.

Mellor runs a graphic design studio out of Perth, Australia called Thinktank (also known as THTA). He has won two International Design Awards and has designed for musicians including Skrillex, Tom Morello (of Rage Against The Machine), Birds of Tokyo, The Bloody Beetroots, Labrinth, Yelawolf, Pete Rock, and Ta-ku. Scott has also designed for Create and Explore, Olympus Corporation, aNYthing, Champion USA, XLARGE Japan, Dim Mak Records.

In 2011, Mellor spoke at the AGIdeas conference in Melbourne to a sold-out crowd.

Mellor is the former art director of the Streetx clothing label, and also worked as the creative director for Origin NYE music festival from 2013 to 2020.
