= Geleitrecht =

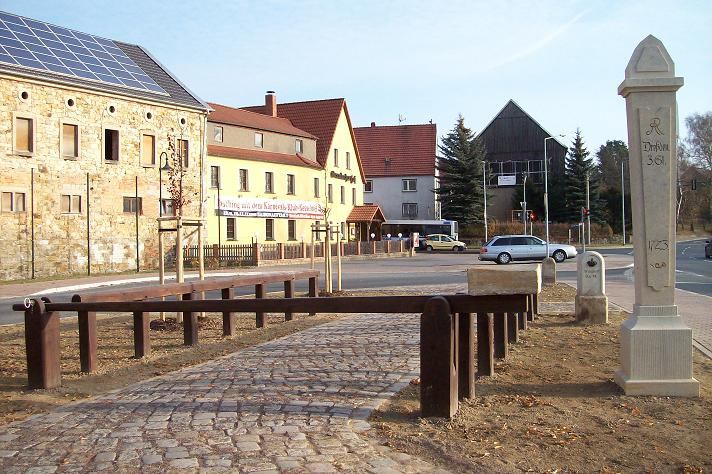
Replica of an escort revenue collection point (Geleitsgeldeinnahme) and a Saxon post half-milestone at a pub in Grumbach

The Geleitrecht ("right of escort") in the Holy Roman Empire was the escorting of travellers or goods guaranteed by the right holder (Geleitherr or "escort lord") within a specified territory or on specific routes. It was a way of providing a form of safe passage for a fee.

== Operation ==
The right of escort was, in the Middle Ages and Early Modern Period, before the emergence of modern statehood with its monopoly on violence, a means of ensuring legal certainty for travellers. An escort was guaranteed by the holder of the right in return for the payment of an escort fee (Geleitgeld). It was thus a popular source of income for the territorial lords. They were able to use their original military prowess and "sell" it for highly prized, hard cash, in an economy that, in the Late Middle Ages and Early Modern period, was overwhelmingly based on barter and natural produce. The boundaries between the regions of the individual escort lords (Geleitherr) were marked by escort crosses (Geleitkreuze) or stones (Geleitsteine).

To begin with, traders were accompanied by mounted escorts (Geleitreiter or Geleitknechte) or teams; later, the escort lord made out letters of authority (Geleitbriefe) that travellers could purchase. In such letters the road owner committed himself to damages if the tradesman suffered losses as a result of robbery; i.e. provided a sort of security insurance. Tradesmen were obliged to use certain paths or routes (a duty known as Straßenzwang). This duty did not apply, however, for all goods nor to other travellers.

== Forms ==
The following types of escort right may be distinguished:

- The Schutzgeleit ("protection escort") was the escorting of travellers, especially merchants, in order to prevent robbery. This was also called a Zollgeleit or "toll escort".
- Ehrengeleit ("honour escort") was an escort that to honour or provide support to very important people and was rather more ceremonial in nature.
- Freies Geleit ("free escort") was the safe conduct of people against whom legal or military action would normally be taken, but who were being protected for particular reasons (peace envoy, witness).
- Prozessgeleit ("trial escort") protected all participants on their way to or from a trial.
- Heeresgeleit ("army escort") was intended to protect foreign troops as they marched through a region.
- Marktgeleit ("market escort") is a special form, because there was a general protection for all those travelling to and from markets, without which in practice they would always need to be guarded by the presence of troops or payment of a toll.
- Numerous individual and special forms that people, who were threatened with arrest or fines, employed to try to keep their freedom to trade.

Whilst escorts were generally provided for people, they could also be used to protect certain goods, e.g. for the transport of the German Imperial Regalia from their repository in Nuremberg to the coronation site of Aachen (until 1531), later: Frankfurt am Main, and back.

== Literature ==
- Koehler, B. "Geleit". Handwörterbuch zur deutschen Rechtsgeschichte. Vol. 1. p. 1482ff.
- Weig, Gebhard. (1970).Das ius conducendi der Bischöfe zu Würzburg. Eine Studie zur Rechtsstruktur, politischen Funktion und Organisation des Geleitsrechtes im Hochstift Würzburg während des 15. und 16. Jahrhunderts, Diss. phil. Würzburg.
