= Augustusburg Hunting Lodge =

Castle

Coordinates: 50°48′47.6″N 13°5′57.15″E

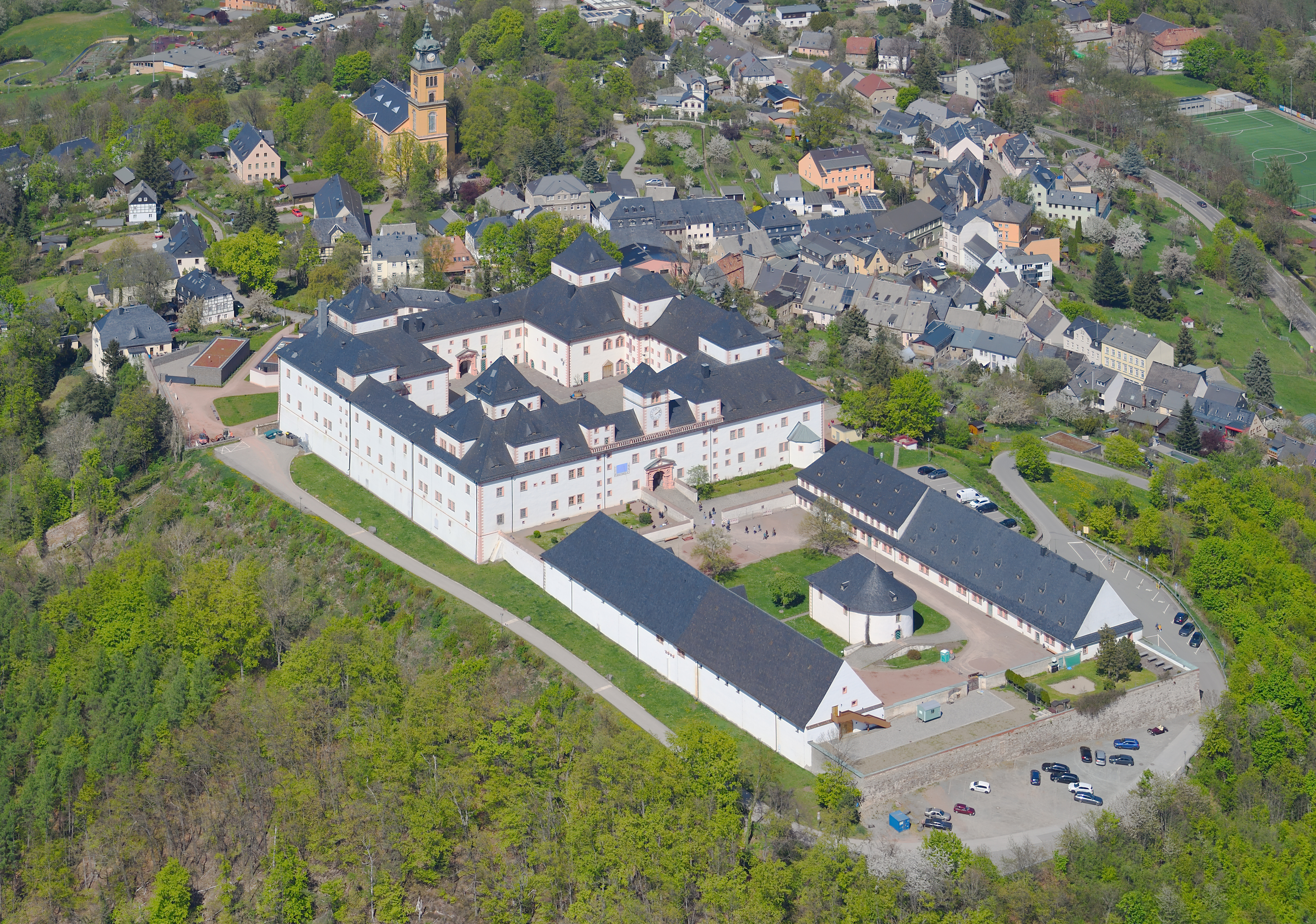
Aerial view from the south

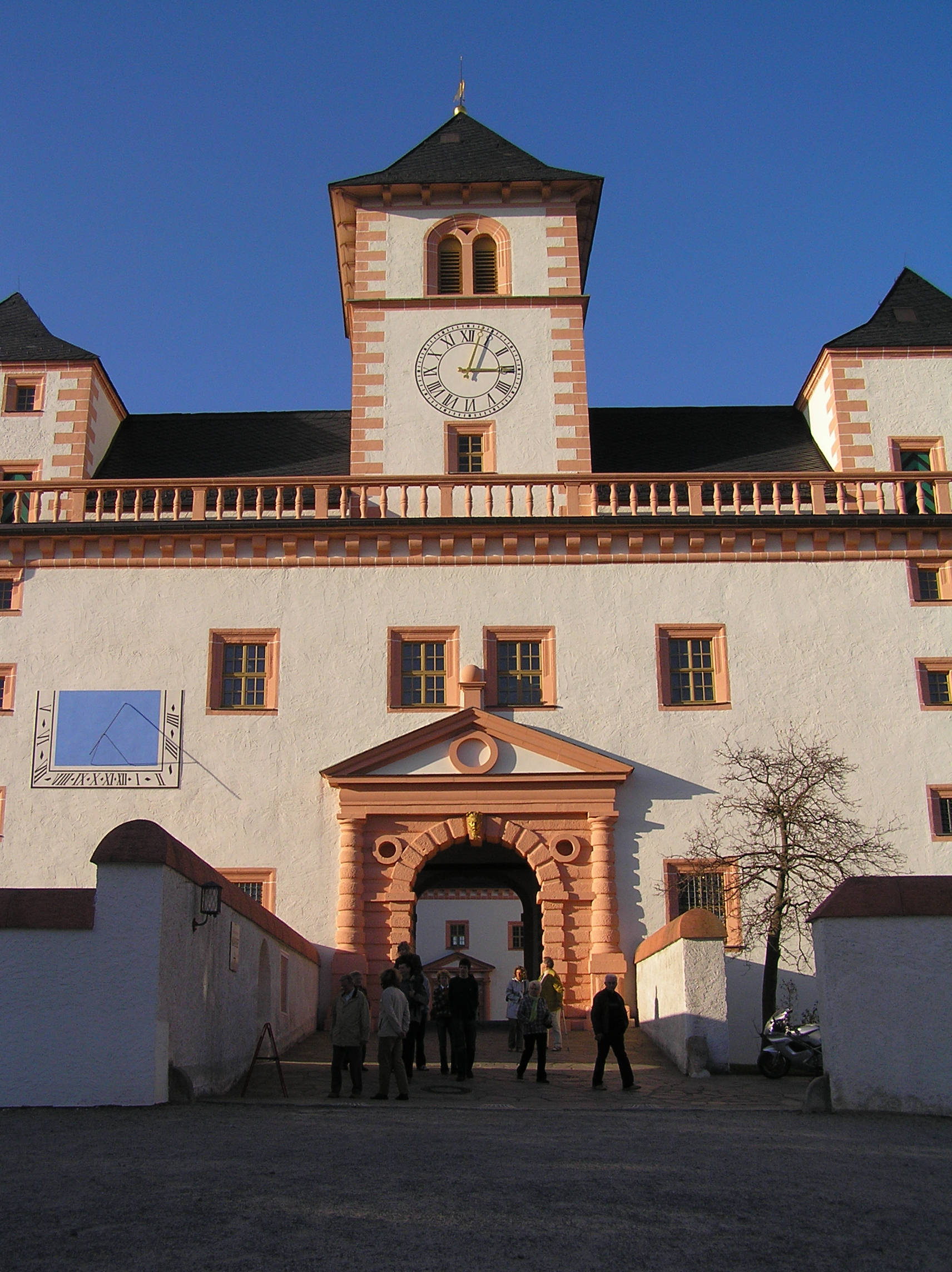
Main entrance

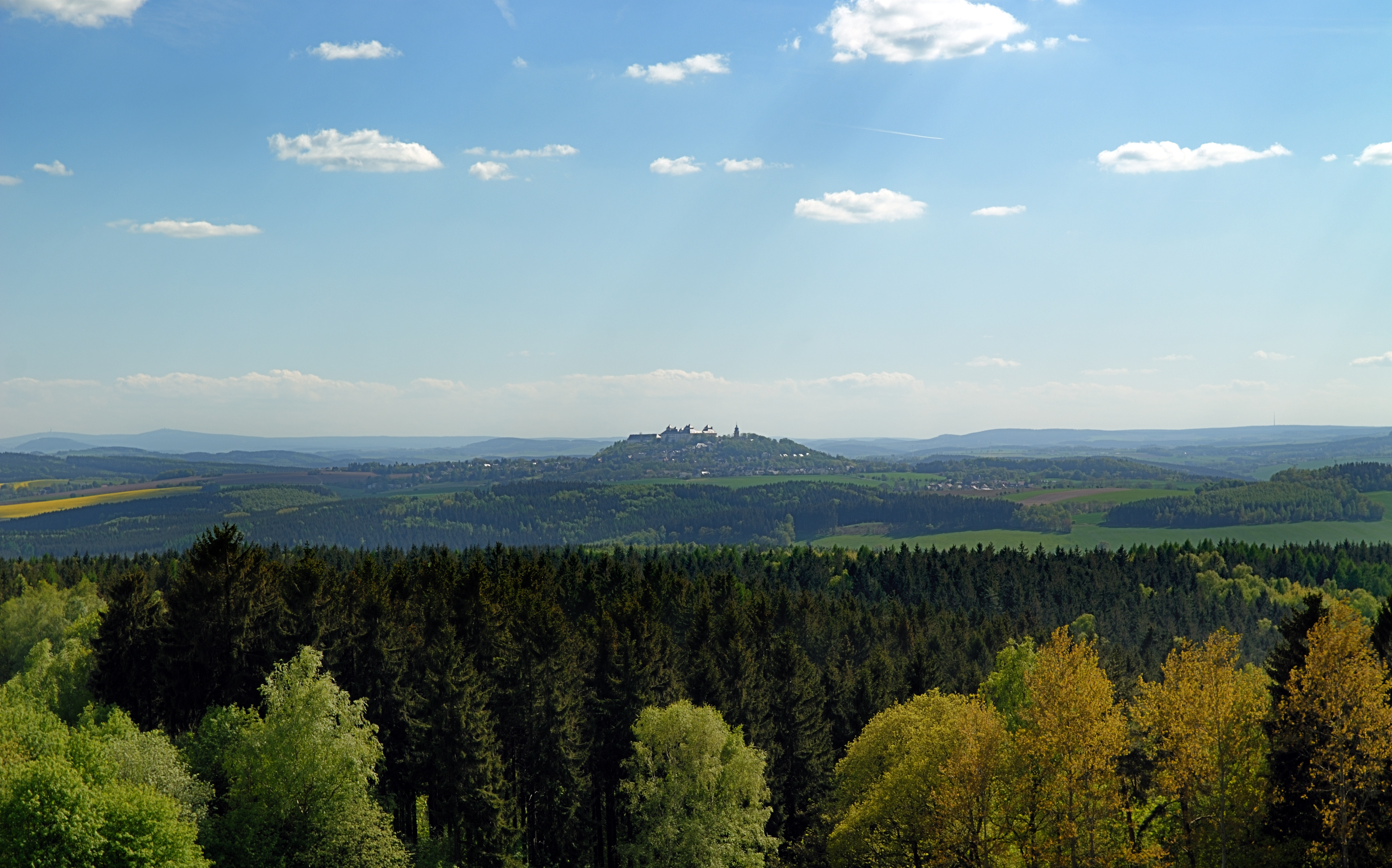
Hunting lodge and surrounding countryside

The hunting lodge of Augustusburg (German: Jagdschloss Augustusburg) was built from 1568 to 1572 above the town of the same name on a hill called the Schellenberg (516 m above sea level (NN)) on the northern edge of the Ore Mountains of Germany. The castle, which is visible from afar, is a local landmark. It lies about 12 kilometres (7 mi) east of the city of Chemnitz and about 21 kilometres (13 mi) southwest of Freiberg in the Free State of Saxony.

In building a new castle, Prince Elector Augustus wanted not just to create a prestigious palace for his hunting trips, but also to underline his leading position in Central Germany. The immediate occasion for its construction was his victory in the Grumbach Brawl (Grumbachsche Händel). By enforcing the imperial ban on his Ernestine rivals – John Frederick the Middle and outlawed knight, Wilhelm von Grumbach, who sought refuge with John Frederick – the Albertine elector, Augustus, was able secure his supremacy over the Ernestines. He was also given the Ämter of Weida, Ziegenrück and Arnshaugk, which belonged to what later became the Neustädter Kreis (Neustadt District). Thanks to the thriving economy of the Electorate of Saxony under Moritz and Augustus, the necessary finance for the construction of the castle was available.

== Background ==
Before the hunting lodge was built, an old castle owned by the von Schellenberg family was located on the same spot.

This had been built around 1210/30 and was granted in 1324 to the House of Wettin after the so-called Schellenberg Feud. It was further fortified in the late 14th century. For example, an outer wall (Zwingermauer) and a well and wellhouse were built. Between 1528 and 1547 the castle was severely damaged by fire and lightning. An illustration in the altar picture of the castle church could be of the Schellenburg at that time, but it is not clear.

For a long time the design of the palace was attributed to the master builder and mayor of Leipzig, Hieronymus Lotter. It is clear, however, that when Lotter was appointed, a finished model of the castle already existed. According to current thinking, he only had the role of chief architect, responsible for executing the completed design. The two plans made by him are based on the already finished wooden model and the annotated changes he proposed were mainly declined by the Elector. The Italian style stairs with their straight flights (instead of the usual spiral staircases) and details in the design of the roofs are assigned to his influence. The design of parts of the north portal and chapel of the hunting lodge are traceable to Erhardt van der Meer, Lotter's senior clerk of works. The first clerk of works during the construction was Paul Widemann until his death in 1568.

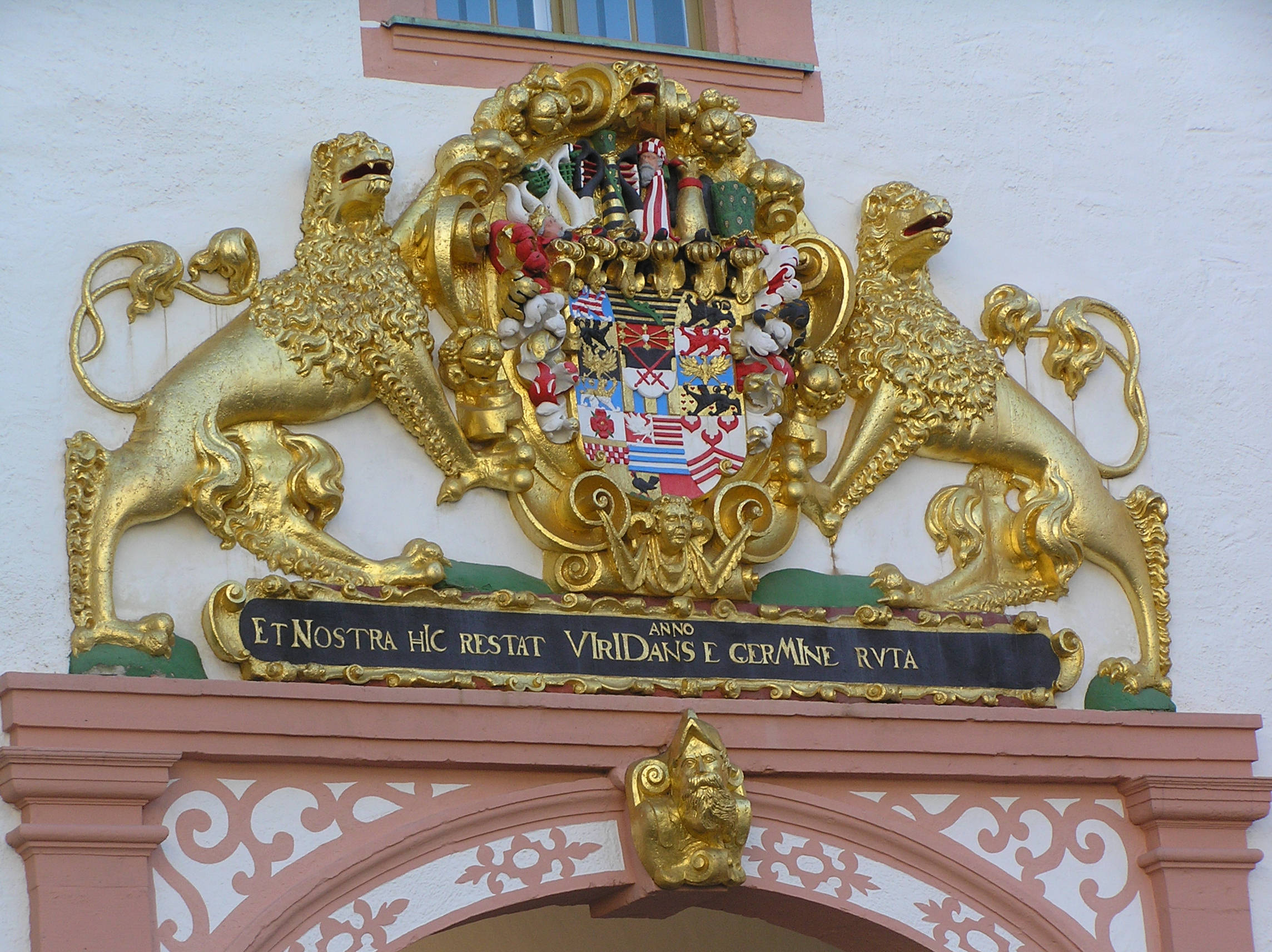
Coat of arms above the entrance way

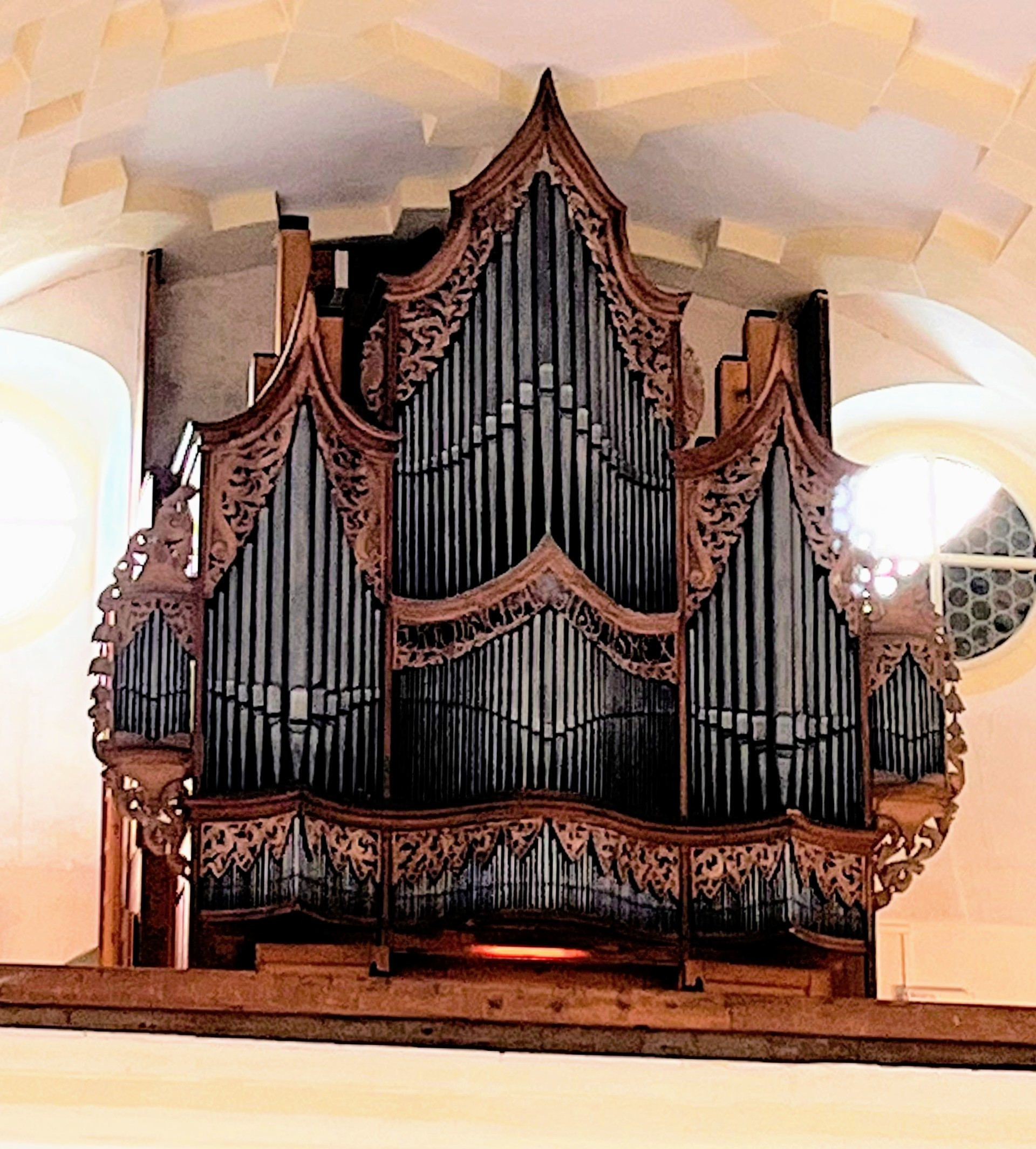
Renkewitz-Organ (1784) in the castle church

Current understanding is that it was most likely that the overall design was prepared at the court of Elector Augustus under the supervision of the architect, Hans Irmscher. Since there are gaps in the sources relating to the authorship of the designs of Augustusburg Castle, it has even been attributed to Augustus himself. What is clear is the Elector's great interest in matters concerning construction and architecture. His library contained many architectural documents and template books of architectural elements. The architecture of the castle does not match that of traditional palace buildings in the rest of Saxony. Rather, it may be assumed that the Elector took the inspiration for his creation from the theoretical documents in his library.

== Personalities ==
- Georg Renkewitz (1687–1758) organist and organ builder in Augustusburg
- Sophie Sabina Apitzsch (1692–1752), confidence trickster, was imprisoned here in 1714
- Ludwig Würkert (1800–1876), Protestant priest, author and revolutionary, was imprisoned here in 1849
- Hans Seifert (1889–?), Nazi politician, leader of the Gauschulungsburg on the Augustusburg, where he also lived
- Fritz Rößler (1912–1987), NSDAP-Politiker, leader of the Gauschulungsburg on the Augustusburg, later under the name, Dr. Franz Richter, Bundestag MP

== Motorcycle museum ==
The castle contains a motorcycle museum with 1,200 m^{2} (12,916.7 sq ft) of exhibit space comprising 175 individual exhibits. The collection has objects across the history of motorcycling, including an example of the first series-produced motorcycle, a Hildebrand & Wolfmüller.

== Gallery ==
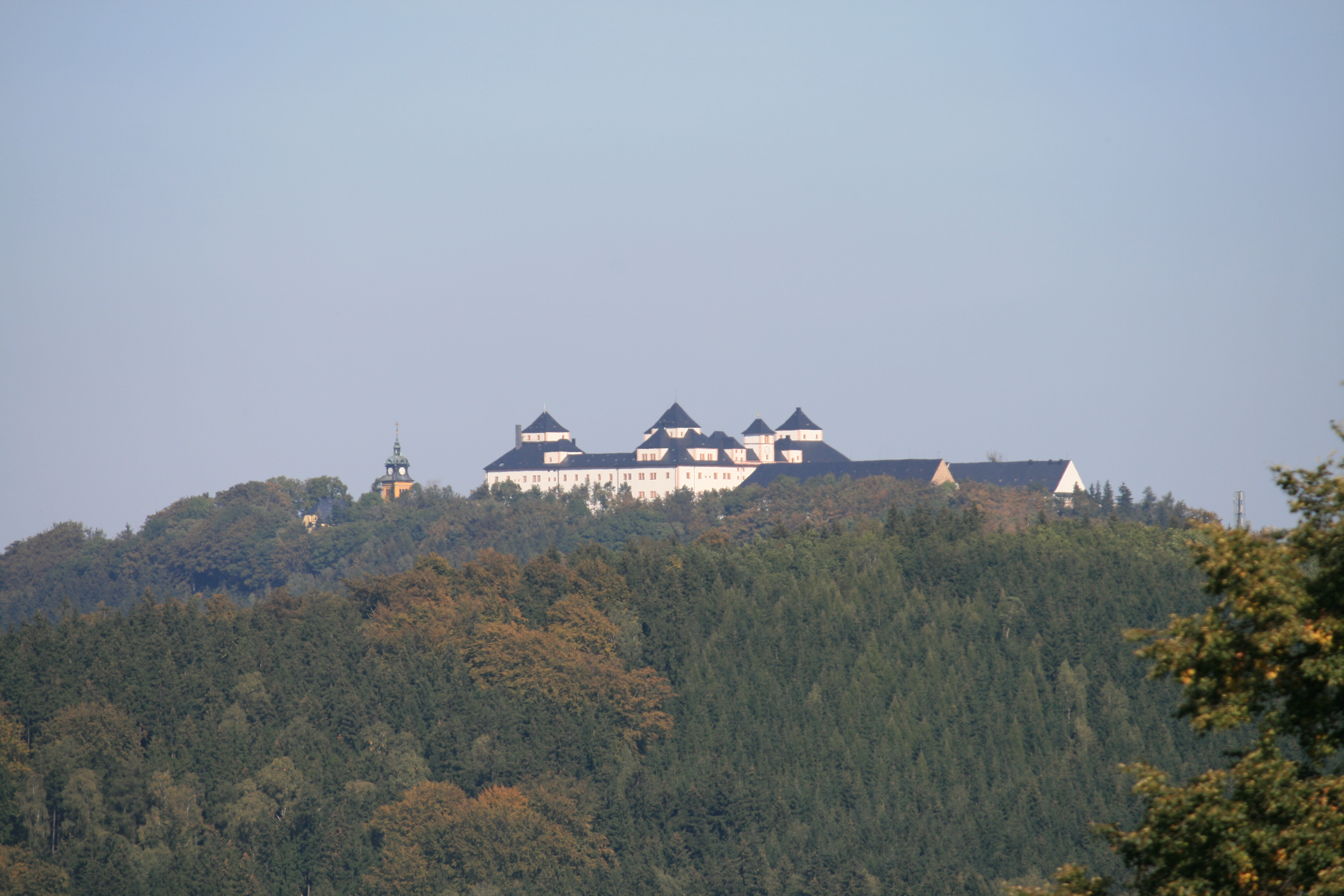
Distant view of Augustusburg

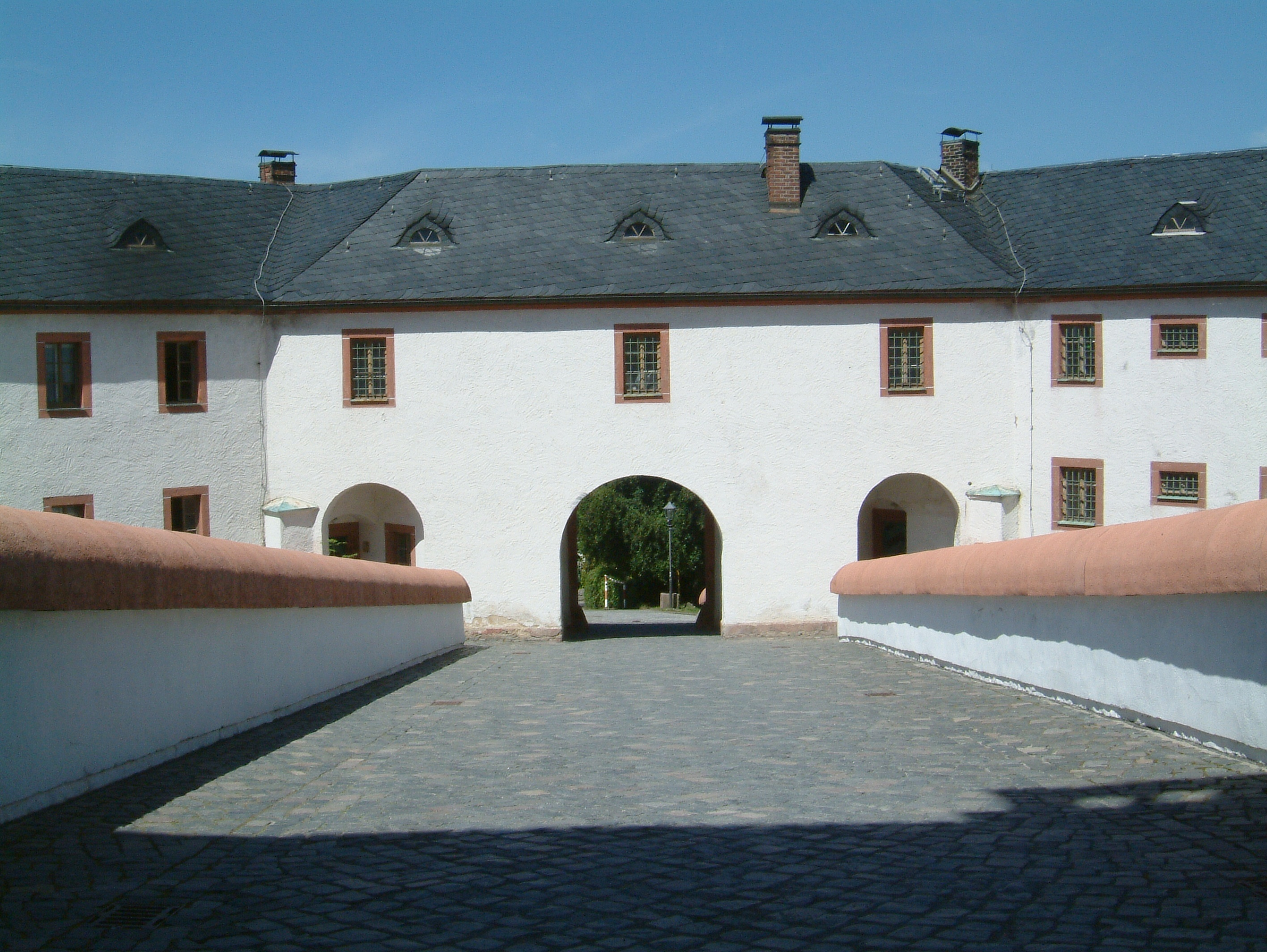
The north gate from inside

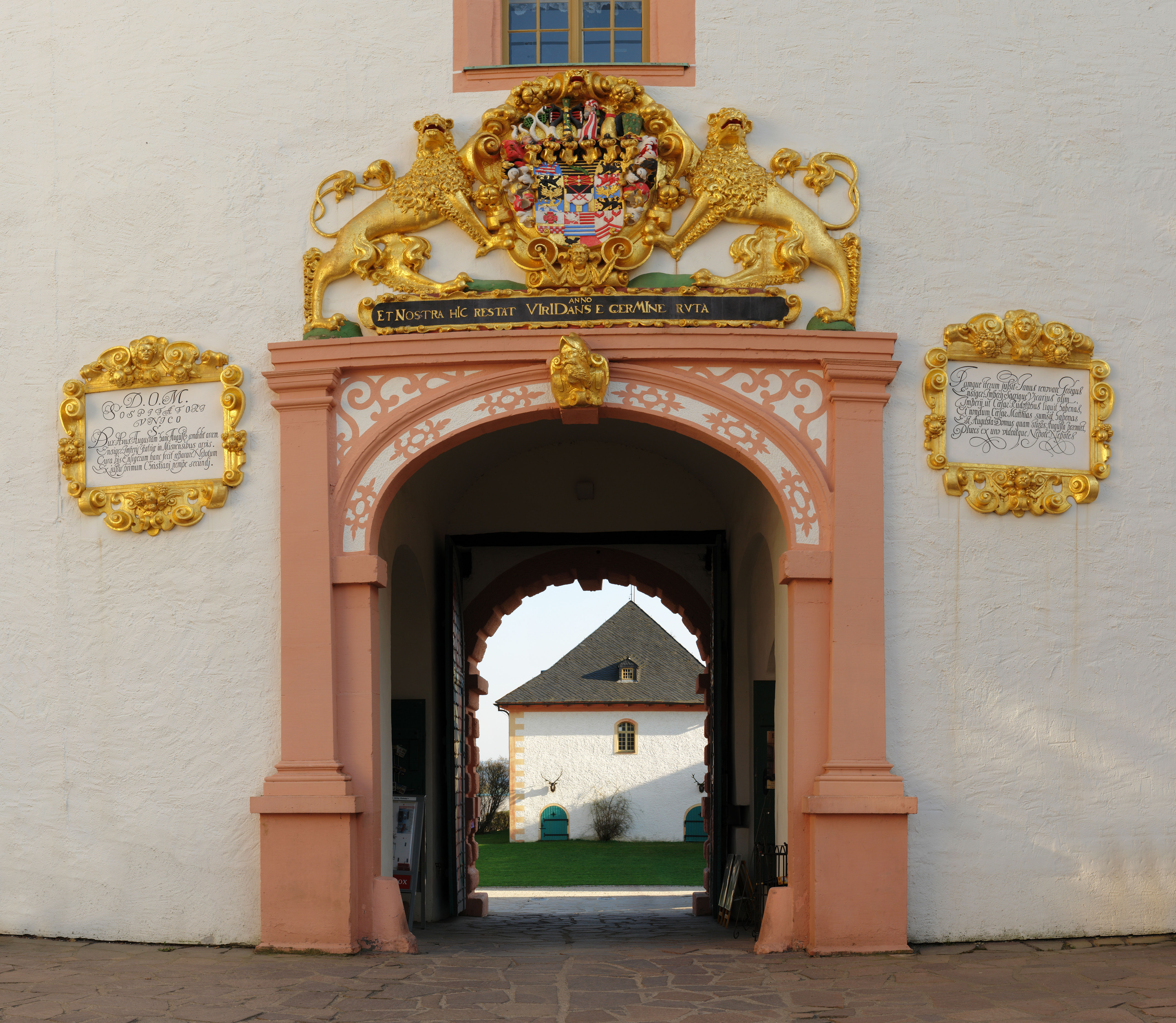
The inner south gate from inside

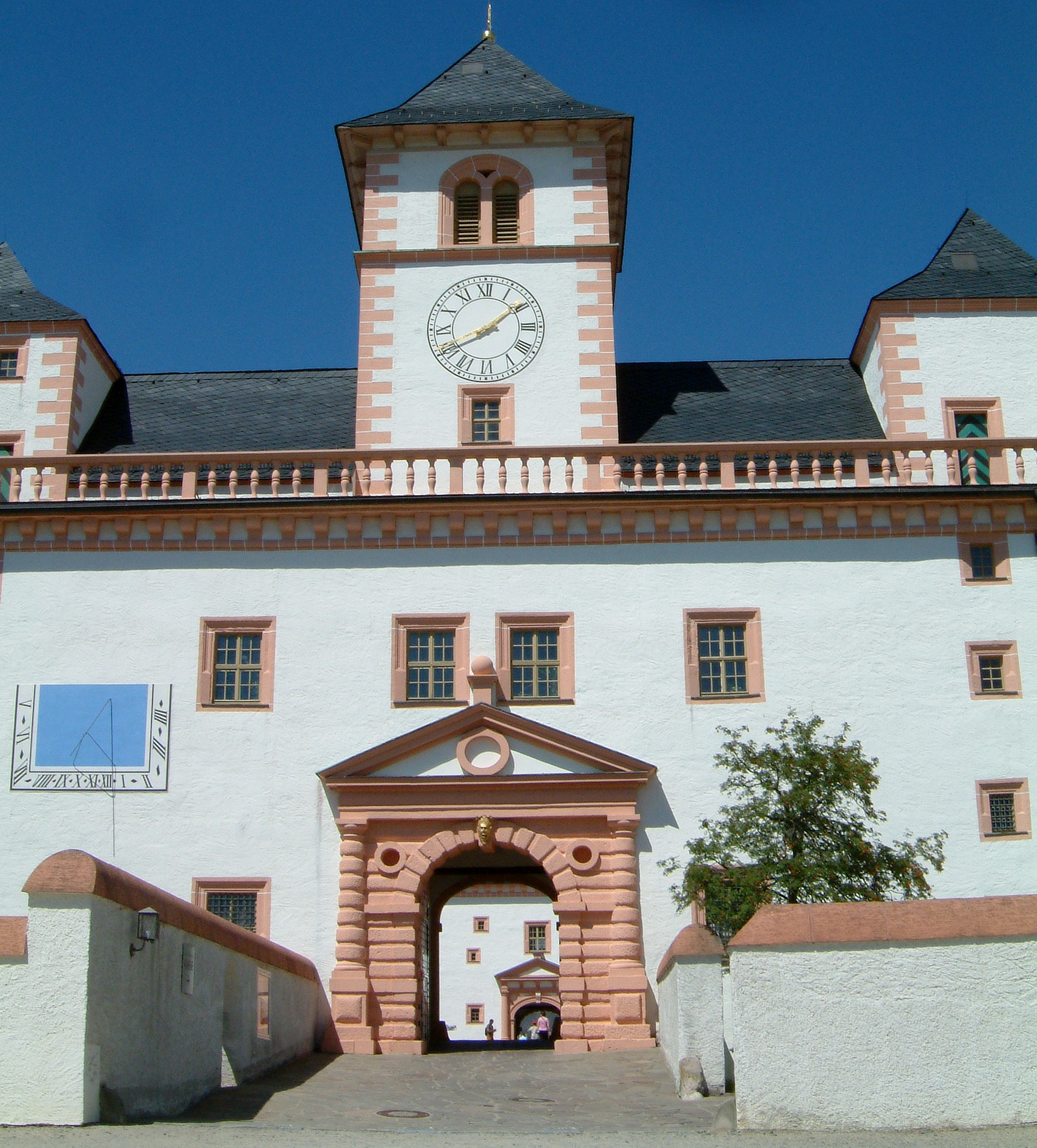
The south gate from outside

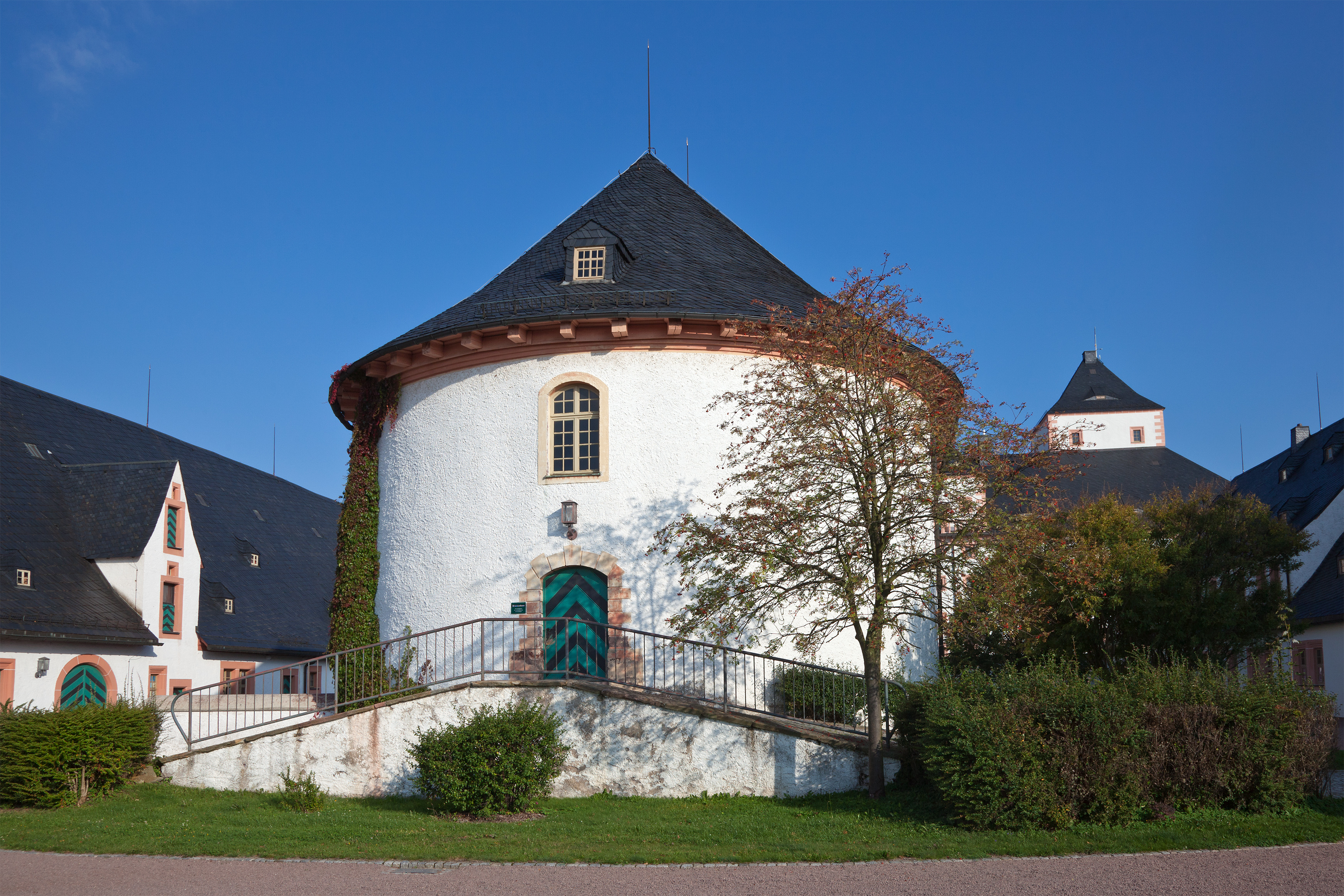
Well house
