= Arnold Bartetzky =

German art historian and architecture critic

Arnold Bartetzky (born 1965) is a German art historian and freelance journalist (art and architecture critic).

== Life ==
Born in Zabrze, Bartetzky studied art history, German language and literature, philosophy and history at the Albert-Ludwigs-Universität Freiburg, the Eberhard Karls Universität Tübingen and the Jagiellonian University as well as architecture in Berlin. In 1995 he became a research associate and in 2011 he became the coordinator for art history at the Humanities Centre for the History and Culture of Eastern Central Europe, today's Leibniz-Institut für Geschichte und Kultur des östlichen Europa (GWZO) in Leipzig. In 1998 he received his doctorate at the University of Freiburg. He accepted lectureships in Leipzig, Jena and Paderborn. He is also a lecturer at the DenkmalAkademie. He works, among other things, as an art and architecture critic for the Frankfurter Allgemeine Zeitung (since 1999), for the expert group for urban monument protection at the Federal Ministry of Transport and Digital Infrastructure and as editor of the series "Visuelle Geschichtskultur" [Visual Historical Culture] by Böhlau Verlag.

== Publications ==
- Das Große Zeughaus in Danzig: Baugeschichte, architekturgeschichtliche Stellung, repräsentative Funktion, Forschungen zur Geschichte und Kultur des östlichen Mitteleuropa vol. 9, Steiner, Stuttgart 1998.
- Die Baumeister der "deutschen Renaissance": ein Mythos der Kunstgeschichte?. Sax-Verlag, Beucha 2004.
- Neue Staaten – neue Bilder?: visuelle Kultur im Dienst staatlicher Selbstdarstellung in Zentral- und Osteuropa seit 1918, Visuelle Geschichtskultur. vol. 1, Böhlau, Cologne 2005 (published with Marina Dmitrieva and Stefan Troebst).
- Imaginationen des Urbanen: Konzeption, Reflexion und Fiktion von Stadt in Mittel- und Osteuropa. Lukas-Verlag, Berlin 2009 (published by Marina Dmitrieva and Alfrun Kliems).
- Nation – Staat – Stadt: Architektur, Denkmalpflege und Geschichtskultur vom 19. bis zum 21. Jahrhundert, Visuelle Geschichtskultur. vol. 9, Böhlau, Cologne 2012.
- Geschichte im Rundumblick: Panoramabilder im östlichen Europa, Visuelle Geschichtskultur. vol. 11, Böhlau, Cologne 2014 (published with Rudolf Jaworski).
- Von der Ablehnung zur Aneignung?: das architektonische Erbe des Sozialismus in Mittel- und Osteuropa = From rejection to appropriation?, Visuelle Geschichtskultur vol. 12, Böhlau, Cologne 2014 (published with Jörg Haspel).
- Die gerettete Stadt: Architektur und Stadtentwicklung in Leipzig seit 1989, Erfolge, Risiken, Verluste. Lehmstedt, Leipzig 2015, ISBN 978-3-942473-93-4.
