= United Kingdom and the Islamic State =

The Islamic State of Iraq and the Levant (ISIL) is proscribed as a terrorist organisation by the United Kingdom. British citizens have fought as members of the group, and there has been political debate on how to punish them. On 26 September 2014, Parliament voted to begin Royal Air Force airstrikes against ISIL in northern Iraq at the request of the Iraqi government, which began four days later, using Tornado GR4 jets. On 2 December 2015, the UK Parliament authorised an extension to the Royal Air Force airstrike campaign, joining the US-led international coalition against ISIL in Syria. Hours after the vote, Royal Air Force Tornado jets began bombing ISIL-controlled oilfields.

== British people in ISIL ==
William Hague, then Foreign Secretary, estimated in June 2014 that 400 British citizens were fighting in Syria, some for ISIL. Khalid Mahmood, a Labour MP, estimated that there were at least 1,500 Britons in ISIL. A more accurate source from the BBC estimates around 850 people from the UK had traveled to Iraq and Syria to support or fight for jihadist groups. Former MI6 counter-terrorism head Richard Barrett raised concerns about the potentially large number of radicalised fighters that had returned to Britain from Syria and Iraq. In August 2014, activists in London handed out leaflets in support of ISIL outside the busy Oxford Circus branch of Topshop.

Beginning in 2012, dozens of girls and women travelled to Iraq and Syria to join the Islamic State, becoming brides of the Islamic State fighters. While some travelled voluntarily, including three British schoolgirls known as the Bethnal Green trio, others were taken to IS-controlled territories as minors, either by their families or through coercion. The youngest ISIL bride known to have voluntarily travelled to Syria was 15. Three British families with young children, the Mannans from Luton and the Dawoods and the Ameens from Bradford, all traveled to Syria to join ISIL in 2015. Another British family with four small children left their home in England and attempted to reach ISIL in Syria but were stopped in Turkey. Several British sibling groups are also known to have joined, as did dozens of students and recent graduates, most of them British citizens, from a medical school in Sudan.

Between 2016 and 2017, UK Counter Terrorism Policing discovered and monitored an ISIL-inspired plot by four women, three of whom were family members, to carry out terrorist attacks in London, in what was described as Britain's first all-female terrorist plot. On 24 October 2017, it was announced that a British man who had been fighting against Isil with the Kurdish YPG in Raqqa had been killed whilst trying to clear land mines. This took the total number of British volunteers fighting ISIL in Syria to six.

=== Amira Abase ===
Amira Abase, age 15, left her home in London to join ISIL in February 2015 with two school friends from Bethnal Green Academy: 15-year-old Shamima Begum and 16-year-old Kadiza Sultana. The three girls were collectively known as the Bethnal Green trio. They had been recruited by a friend, Sharmeena Begum (unrelated to Shamima), who travelled to Syria before they did. All three of the girls in the Bethnal Green Trio married shortly after arriving in Syria. Abase married an 18-year-old Australian jihadist, Abdullah Elmir, who in July 2016 was reported by Australian intelligence agencies to have been killed in coalition airstrikes. Abase is also believed to be dead. Her nom de guerre was found online, on a document titled "In loving memory of the shahada", a collection of English-language obituaries of ISIL members, along with those of Sultana and her husband. Per the document, during ISIL's last stand at Al-Baghuz Fawqani, Abase was killed by artillery fire while in a trench with other ISIL women and children after they refused to surrender.

=== Nasra Abdullahi Abukar ===
Nasra Abdullahi Abukar was a Somali-born British citizen who left her home in Lewisham, South London for Syria and ISIL on June 3, 2014, when she was 18. Her mother described her as having been "groomed through the internet" and said before her disappearance she had not been particularly religious. A week after her disappearance from London, Abukar called her mother to say she had gone to Syria to "help the women and children". Abukar married Aseel Muthana, a Welsh jihadist, and they had two sons. They lived in Raqqa, ISIL's Syrian capital. She created multiple Twitter accounts and posted ISIL propaganda under the nom de guerre Umm Faris, praising life in the caliphate and cheering on the November 2015 terrorist attacks in Paris. Her mother stated that within a year of arriving in Syria, Abukar said she regretted having left and wanted to return to Britain.

Abukar had her British citizenship revoked in October 2017 for joining ISIL. She was sent to the Al-Hawl refugee camp with one of their sons, then age three, after the 2019 fall of the ISIL caliphate. Abukar's other child was killed in an airstrike which also injured her husband. Abukar's mother said she wanted to go to Somalia, where her father lived.

=== Ameen family: Rehan, Imran, Farzana and five children ===
Eight members of the same British Pakistani family, the Ameens, left the Bradford in United Kingdom for Turkey in 2015 and disappeared; they are believed to have travelled to war-torn Syria and were speculated to have joined the ISIL. First to disappear was 30-year-old Rehan Noor-Ul-Ameen, in June 2015; he traveled to Turkey and is thought to have crossed into Syria after that. In October that year, Rehan's brother Imran, his brother's wife Farzana and the couple's five children aged between 5 and 14 left their home in Bradford and also travelled to Turkey, like Rehan had. None of them ever returned. The Ameens were the second family who disappeared from the city of Bradford in 2015 and were believed to have travelled to Syria; the other family was the Dawoods, who went missing in May. There did not appear to be any links between the two families. In January 2016, the police launched a fresh appeal for information as to the whereabouts of the Ameen family and the Dawood family, who had still not returned. In August, both families were confirmed to still be missing.

=== Talha Asmal ===
Talha Asmal was a 17-year-old boy from Dewsbury, West Yorkshire who travelled to Syria to join ISIL with his 17-year-old friend and next door neighbour. On March 31, 2015, the boys took a flight to Turkey. In early April, the British media reported the boys were missing and feared to have joined ISIL. Both their families issued a statement, appealing for anyone with information to contact the police. In June 2015, Asmal participated in a suicide attack in Iraq, detonating a vehicle fitted with explosives. He was the youngest suicide bomber in British history at the time of his death. At the time of his death, the whereabouts of the neighbour boy who accompanied him to Syria were unknown.

=== Shamima Begum ===
Shamima Begum entered Syria to join ISIL at the age of 15. She went to Syria in February 2015 with two of her friends, Amira Abase and Kadiza Sultana; they are collectively known as the Bethnal Green trio and had been recruited by a friend, Sharmeena Begum (unrelated), who travelled to Syria before they did. All three of the girls in the Bethnal Green Trio married shortly after arriving in Syria. Kadiza Sultana was killed in an airstrike with her second husband. Amira Abase is also presumed to have been killed. Shamima and her husband, Dutch ISIL fighter Yago Riedijk, survived but their children all died of malnutrition and disease. In July 2020, the British Supreme Court issued a ruling allowed Shamima to be repatriated to the UK for investigation of her case. But, on 26 February 2021, the Supreme Court declared reversing the decision for court appeal and her return to the UK. On 22 February 2023, Shamima also lost the legal case for her British Citizenship at the Special Immigration Appeals Commission (SIAC). The case was dismissed for national security of the country. Sir James Eadie KC indicated that she poses a risk of National Security”.

=== Sharmeena Begum ===
15-year-old Sharmeena Begum left London to join ISIL in December 2014. She is known to have recruited her three school friends, collectively known as the Bethnal Green trio, to come to Syria after her. According to police, she was encouraged by two unidentified women to join ISIL. Members of her family were certain that she was targeted for recruitment by a group known as the Sisters Forum within the Islamic Forum of Europe, which met at an east London mosque. After the collapse of the Islamic State caliphate at the Battle of Al-Baghuz Fawqani, Sharmeena was taken to the Al Hawl refugee camp, from which she escaped and disappeared. In 2023, she was contacted online by the BBC, which reported she was in hiding in Syria, raising money for the ISIL through social media. In September 2026, Begum was arrested in northern Syria after German authorities investigating the 2026 Berlin Pride attack found messages between her and the attacker, Abdul Ballout, including a reported video in which he pledged allegiance to ISIL.

=== Boular siblings: Safaa and Rizlaine ===
Three members of the same family were convicted in an all-female ISIL-inspired terror plot between 2016 and 2017. In 2014, Rizlaine Boular ran away from her family's home in Vauxhall, London and tried to travel to Syria, but was stopped in Istanbul and returned to the UK. In 2016, her younger sister Safaa met Naweed Hussain, an ISIL jihadist from Coventry, online and married him in a nikah ceremony conducted over a messaging app. She planned to go to Syria to join him and take Rizlaine, but the UK security police found out about the plan and confiscated Safaa's passport. When Hussain realized Safaa could not come to Syria, he suggested she launch a terrorist attack in the UK. The plot was discovered. Hussain was killed in a drone strike in Syria and Safaa, by then 18, was arrested. She encouraged her sister Rizlaine and their mother, Mina Dich, to carry out the terror attack in her absence. All three family members were convicted of terror offenses in relation to this plot, as was an unrelated woman, Khawla Barghouthi, a friend of Rizlaine's who had known about the plot and failed to inform police. At 18, Safaa Boular was the youngest woman to be convicted of plotting a terror attack in the UK.

=== Khadijah Dare and her son ===
British-Nigerian convert to Islam, Khadjiah Dare (formerly known as Grace) travelled to Syria in 2013 with her young son. She married Swedish-Iraqi jihadist Abdul Ghameed Abbas, who was fighting with the jihadi militia Katiba al Muhajireen. The couple lived outside Aleppo and in the summer of 2013 they appeared on Channel 4 and talked about their lives. Abbas was killed in an airstrike in 2014, but not before conceiving a child with Dare. At some point Dare joined ISIL. In January 2016, ISIL released a new propaganda video which showed the execution-style killing of five people said to be spies working for the British government. The video included a brief clip of a young boy dressed in fatigues and a black bandana with an ISIL logo, saying, "We will kill the kuffar over there," while pointing at a car in the distance with what appeared to be prisoners trapped inside it. After the video was posted online, Dare's father in England identified the child, dubbed 'Jihadi Junior' in the press, as his four-year-old grandson whom Dare had taken to Syria. In February, a month after the first video was released, Dare’s son appeared in a second propaganda video with an unidentified ISIL fighter and three men, who identified themselves as Syrians who had spied for British intelligence. The video showed Dare’s son pressing the detonator and blowing up a car, apparently the same car as in the previous video, with the three men inside it. At the end, the boy shouted, "Allahu Akbar!" As of 2022, Dare's fate and whereabouts, and that of her children, is unknown or unrecorded.

=== Siddhartha Dhar ===
On 3 January 2016, Siddhartha Dhar, a British citizen of Indian roots, was named the lead executioner in an IS film showing the executions of alleged British spies.

=== Dawood family: Ahmed, Sugra, Zohra, Khadija and nine children ===
Thirteen members of the same British Pakistani family left the United Kingdom and disappeared, reportedly to join IS in Syria. First to leave was Ahmed Dawood. He had been fighting with ISIL in the Syrian civil war for over a year when his three older sisters and their nine children left their homes in Bradford, West Yorkshire, England together to join him in May 2015. The Dawood siblings were Ahmed, who was 21 in 2015, and his sisters Sugra, 34, Zohra, 33, and Khadija, 30. Sugra took her five children, sons aged 15, 14, and 3, and daughters aged 8 and 5. Zohra took her daughters, aged 8 and 5. Khadija took her two children, a daughter aged 7, and a son aged 5. The women left their husbands behind.

The Dawood parents are Pashtun and the family practiced a conservative form of Islam. Zohra and her brother Ahmed were particularly close to one another, and Zohra was upset after his departure for Syria in 2013 or 2014. Counterterrorism police encouraged the family to maintain contact with Ahmed after he joined the Syrian jihad. Sugra reportedly kept in touch with Ahmed over Skype. The sisters' husbands later suggested that by encouraging contact with Ahmed, the police had been "complicit in the grooming and radicalizing of the women."

On 19 March 2015, the Dawood sisters and their children attempted to fly out of Manchester Airport to Jeddah in Saudi Arabia but were prevented from doing so and questioned by security about their intentions under the Terrorism Act of 2000. They said they planned to go on Umrah. The questioning caused them to miss their flight. The women went to the police and complained that they had been prevented from flying, and sought written permission to leave Britain. A detective constable from the West Yorkshire Police wrote a letter for them, saying, "I can confirm the passengers do not have any restrictions on their movements out of or into the United Kingdom." The letter said they had been questioned by Greater Manchester Police "due to an ongoing Police investigation into a separate person" meaning Ahmed Dawood. The women also sent formal written requests to ask that their school-age children be allowed to be absent from school for the time spent on pilgrimage, but got replies saying the requests were denied and their children's absences would be marked as unexcused.

The sisters and their children left for Saudi Arabia on 28 May and this time they were able to fly. They were supposed to return to the UK on 11 June. Instead, on 9 June, the family members boarded a flight from Medina to Istanbul. The sisters paid cash for the flight. They then crossed the border into Syria in two groups. On 17 June, Zohra left a voicemail for her family back in England, saying she was in Syria and had left because of the continued surveillance by counterterrorism police, which she called "oppressive."

Sugra and Khadija's husbands made televised pleas begging them to return with the children. Sugra's husband cried during his statement, saying, "We had a perfect relationship, we had a lovely family. I don’t know what happened." He also addressed his oldest son directly, asking the 15-year-old boy to contact him if he saw the broadcast. A lawyer representing the two husbands said they were "normal people" who had had "no inkling" of their wives' plans. Zohra's estranged husband in Pakistan said he was "shocked" by what had happened.

Sugra's second-oldest son continued to post on his Facebook account after his arrival in Syria, including a photo of himself dressed in combat gear and holding an AK-47. In August 2016 he posted tributes to his uncle Ahmed and to his older brother, with the phrase "May Allah accept them." This is a common Islamic prayer for the dead, which led to speculation in the press that both Ahmed and Ahmed's nephew may have been killed by that point. The boy's Facebook page was later taken down.

The Dawoods were only the first family who disappeared from the city of Bradford in 2015 and were believed to have travelled to Syria; the other family was the Ameens. There did not appear to be any links between the two families. In January 2016, the police launched a fresh appeal for information as to the whereabouts of the Ameen family and the Dawood family, who had still not returned. In August 2016, around the time of Sugra's son's last Facebook post, both families were confirmed to still be missing.

=== Samya Dirie ===
Samya Dirie was 17 when she disappeared from her home in Stockwell, South London on September 24, 2014 with 15-year-old girl from Bristol, Yusra Hussien. They are known to have travelled together to Istanbul in Turkey, and are believed to have gone from there to the territory of the Islamic State of Iraq and the Levant in Syria. The missing persons report for Dirie was filed three hours before her flight left Heathrow Airport, but the police were unable to stop her and Hussien from leaving. Dirie's father said his daughter did not know Hussien but speculated they might have chatted online. After the two teenagers disappeared, Dirie contacted a cousin and said she was somewhere relatively safe. Nothing more is known of her fate.

=== Ronald Fiddler ===
On 21 February 2017, around Mosul a suicide bombing was carried out by a past inmate of Guantanamo called Jamal al Harith. His original name was Ronald Fiddler, and he also called himself Abu Zakariya. Britain's Conservative government had given him one million pounds over his time in Guantanamo. Fiddler's parents were Jamaican. He went to Tell Abyad.

=== Tooba Gondal ===
Tooba Gondal, a French citizen who moved to Britain as a small child and was raised in Walthamstow, East London, left Britain to join ISIL in early 2015 when she was 21 years old. Simon Cottee, an academic who studies terrorism, called Gondal a "prolific, energetic propagandist", the most prolific of all the western ISIL-affiliated women. She posted ISIL propaganda online and recruited women between late 2014 and 2017, and tried to recruit her own younger sister. She wrote about receiving military training also. The British Home Office issued an exclusion order in 2017 to prevent Gondal's return to the UK. Her activities in ISIL were the subject of a documentary, The MatchMaker, directed by Benedetta Argentieri. In February 2019, during the Battle of Baghuz Fawqani, Gondal escaped Baghuz, which was the last territory ISIL still held in Syria, with her two children. She was trying to reach the Turkish border but was captured by Kurdish forces and sent to a detention center. While in custody, she was interviewed by The Sunday Times, claimed she had been "manipulated". She said she wanted to return to Britain. She was instead repatriated to France, the country of her birth. She was tried in France for her ISIL links in December 2023. The court sentenced her to ten years in prison for terrorism offenses.

=== Halane siblings: Ahmed, Salma and Zahra ===
Three British resident siblings of Danish nationality left their family home in Manchester to join jihadist groups. Salma and Zahra are twins; Ahmed is their older brother. Ahmed is alleged to have fought with Al-Shabaab in Somalia and to have joined the Islamic State of Iraq and the Levant in Syria in 2013. In 2014, Zahra and Salma ran away to join ISIL in Syria. They were sixteen years old at the time. Ahmed returned to Denmark and lived there as of 2015. Zahra was repatriated to Denmark with her son in 2024, and sentenced to prison for terrorism. Salma is still in Syria.

The siblings are from a Muslim family of Somali descent. They were born in Skejby in Denmark, the offspring of refugees. The Halane family moved to the Manchester, England area when the siblings were young. Their father is a prominent Quran reciter in the local community. Zahra and Salma were well-liked among their peers and highly intelligent; they achieved 28 GCSEs between them. They began studying for their A-levels at Connell Sixth Form College. They both wanted to become doctors. Ahmed attended Burnage Academy for Boys. He said he began studying the Quran at age five and had memorized it by the time he was thirteen years old. He knew other people who traveled to Syria to join ISIL in late 2013. That same year, Ahmed left the UK and traveled to Egypt, supposedly to study. He was about twenty years old at the time.

Ahmed dropped out of sight in Egypt and later admitted he had traveled to Somalia, where he reportedly joined the jihadist group Al-Shabaab. Later that year he reportedly traveled to Manbij in Syria and fought in ISIL there, although he denied this. He was banned from return to the United Kingdom, as a security risk. Authorities believe Ahmed was responsible for radicalizing his sisters. On June 26, 2014, Zahra and Salma left their home together, flying out of Manchester Airport to Turkey without their parents' knowledge. They stole £840 in cash from their father and travelled to Istanbul with a couple and an infant, posing as a family group. The twins then went to Syria, arriving on July 9 just after ISIL declared a caliphate. Both girls married British ISIL fighters. Zahra married Ali Kalantar. Salma married Walid Khalil. Zahra took the nom de guerre Umm Zubair, and Salma took the nom de guerre Umm Abdurrahman.

Later in July their parents went to the Turkish border to try to find their children. They were accompanied by a male friend. The friend and the girls' mother left the girls' father at the border and crossed into Syria to try to meet with Zahra and Salma. They were arrested by ISIL militants, wrongly suspected of spying. They were detained for 36 days in separate jails before being taken before an ISIL court, where Zahra and Salma also appeared. The twins told the court they did not want to return to Europe, and their husbands were not willing to give permission for them to travel. The court ordered the release of the twins' mother and her friend, and the Halane parents returned to the United Kingdom without their daughters.

Zahra and Salma were active on social media as recruiters and propagandists for ISIL. Both of them posted photos and details of their lives and praise in celebration of terror attacks. Both girls had accounts on Twitter and Instagram, Salma had an account on Ask.fm where she responded to anonymous questions. The twins encouraged other women to travel to ISIL territory, providing advice on how to avoid the notice of security agencies. On December 4, 2014, Zahra tweeted that her husband Ali Kalantar had been killed. On December 12, Salma's husband Walid Khalil was killed in an airstrike and she announced his death on Twitter also. Zahra later remarried, to another ISlL fighter, and he was killed in battle.

In May 2015, the BBC reported Ahmed was living in Denmark, and a reporter spoke to him. He was reportedly being monitored by Danish intelligence, but had not been charged with any criminal offenses due to a lack of evidence. Abdullahi Ahmed Jama Farah, the Halane siblings' cousin, was convicted of preparing for terrorist acts in February 2016. The prosecution said Farah was an ISIL supporter who had created a "hub of communication" for extremists in his mother's Manchester home starting in 2013. As well as his cousins, Farah knew three British men who had traveled to Syria to join ISIL. Farah was sentenced to seven years at a young offenders institution.

In an interview with the Manchester Evening News in 2017, Islam Mitat, a Moroccan woman who had been taken to ISIL territory against her will by her Afghan-British husband but had escaped, said she had lived in the same house as Salma in Raqqa, ISIL’s Syrian capital, in an area known as "Little Britain" because so many British foreign fighters and their families lived there. Mitat's husband, Ahmed Khalil, was Salma's husband Walid Khalil’s brother, and Mitat moved in with Walid and Salma after her own husband’s death. She stated Salma had helped recruit a 15-year-old girl from Bristol.

In March 2019, ISIL lost the last of its territory in the Battle of Baghuz Fawqani. Salma's son was reportedly killed in the fighting while Zahra's son, aged four or five, survived. Zahra and Salma were sent to the Al-Hawl refugee camp. Other women in the camp said both twins were still committed ISIL supporters. Their mother told The Daily Telegraph Zahra and Salma had been banned from the UK, and the twins themselves told the camp authorities and ITV News that they wanted to be repatriated to Denmark. In the summer of 2020, the twins were caught trying to escape the camp with Zahra's son. As a result, Zahra was transferred to a high security section of another camp, Al-Roj. Salma said poor conditions were the reason they had tried to escape, citing bad water and a lack of medical treatment. She told The Guardian, "We have nothing to do with the Islamic State. I see myself as a victim. I am not happy about the Islamic State." Also in 2020, both twins were stripped of their Danish citizenship.

In 2024, the Danish Supreme Court decided to repatriate Zahra and her son together because to do otherwise would be a violation of the human rights of the boy, who inherited Danish citizenship through her. Salma remains in Syria. In January 2026, Zahra was sentenced to five years in prison by a court in Aarhus, Denmark for joining ISIL and receiving weapons training through them. The court did not believe her defense that she had gone to Syria to do charity work. At her sentencing, Zahra was warned that a second conviction could see her deported from Denmark, as she was administratively stripped of her Danish citizenship while in Syria. She was not deported only because her son, by then aged nine, was dependent on her.

=== Fleet, Hampshire girl ===
In August 2014, days before she was supposed to get the results of her GCSEs, a 16-year-old girl left her home in Fleet, Hampshire in the night and travelled to Syria via Bulgaria and Turkey, using cash stolen from her older sister's wedding fund. She left a letter to her family, saying she was angry and upset about the plight of the Muslims in Syria and "the only way I can help is by leaving and going there to fight." She said she wanted to become a martyr and that "I love you with all my heart but none of you understand Islam in the proper sense." In the letter, she warned her family not to contact the police, and they didn't, but the police eventually heard about her disappearance, searched her family's home in 2015, and found the goodbye letter. She kept in touch with her family back in Britain over Skype, WhatsApp and encrypted messaging apps, and once told them she was going to attend the stoning of a woman, something she described as "so cool." Her family repeatedly appealed to her to return home.

The girl is one of ten siblings and was born in the UK of parents who emigrated from Bangladesh in the 1980s. Her friends and relatives described her as "street smart" and like a "normal teenager". When she was about fourteen, she had become interested in the troubles facing Muslims in other countries; she posted about this on Facebook. She started wearing the hijab around that time, and was allegedly beaten up at school because of it. A relative speculated the incident may have helped radicalize her. She began spending a lot of time online and started communicating with individuals who would help facilitate her trip to Syria. Within weeks of arriving in Raqqa, ISIL's Syrian capital, the girl married Muhammad Mehdi Hassan, one of the Portsmouth jihadists. She became pregnant with his child, but had a miscarriage, and Hassan was killed in October 2014, during the ISIL offensive to capture Kobane. She married again to another foreign fighter, thought to be a Canadian citizen, and gave birth to their daughter in July 2016.

The police warned the Hampshire girl's family not to send her any money, because under British law sending money to the Islamic State is regarded as funding terrorism. She contacted two of her brothers and asked for money, and they both initially refused to give her any. By early 2017, however, one of her brothers had decided to send his sister money. He made a series of bank account withdrawals, then took a total of £2,500 in cash to another town to give it to an intermediary for transfer to Syria. The money was supposed to be so his sister could return home to Britain, but after she got it, she didn't come home and later she asked for more money. In 2018, the Hampshire girl's brother was charged with funding terrorism because of the money he sent. The judge called him "naive" and not an ISIL supporter, but stated, "I have to follow the sentencing guidelines and make it clear to others that sending money or property that will support a terrorist cause will not be tolerated." Her brother was sentenced to 30 months in prison.

In early 2019, during ISIL's territorial last stand at Baghuz, the Hampshire girl's family made a public appeal for her to return to the UK. Counterterrorism officials stated they believed she was with her second husband near Baghuz. She has reportedly been stripped of her British citizenship for joining ISIL, and her family was appealing this.

=== Naweed Hussain ===
Naweed Hussain was originally from Coventry and traveled to Syria to join ISIL with a friend in June 2015, leaving his wife and child behind. Under the nom de guerre Abu Usamah al-Britani, he unsuccessfully tried to convince a 29-year-old glamour model to marry him and join him in Syria. She was arrested when police intercepted their messages, but released without charge. Hussain was also in communication with Safaa Boular online and they married over an app when she was 16 and he was 30. They shared violent images between them, including of executions, and Safaa began to do so when she was only 16. The UK security services had taken Safaa's passport and she couldn't travel to Syria like she and Hussain planned, so he suggested she carry out a terrorist attack in the UK. Safaa and her sister and mother and a friend were subsequently convicted of plotting a terrorist attack. In 2017, Naweed's brother Nadeem Hussain was convicted of being concerned in making arrangements to make money available for the purposes of terrorism; he admitted he had sent £4,000 in cash to Naweed in Syria. Naweed was killed in a UK-led drone strike in Raqqa in February 2018.

=== Yusra Hussien ===
Yusa Hussien she disappeared from her home in Bristol on September 24, 2014 with a 17-year-old girl from Stockwell, Samya Dirie. Hussien was 15 years old at the time and had been recruited by Salma Halane a 16-year-old girl who had run away from her Manchester, England home with her twin sister to join ISIL. Hussien and Dirie are known to have travelled together to Istanbul in Turkey, and are believed to have gone from there to the territory of the Islamic State of Iraq and the Levant in Syria. Hussien is believed to have been the youngest ISIL recruit from Britain. Dirie's father said his daughter did not know Hussien but speculated they might have chatted online. After the two teenagers disappeared, Hussien communicated with friends over Facebook and said she was safe and happy but wouldn't disclose where she was or what she was doing. In February 2015, Hussien, now 16 years old, was reported to have gotten married in Syria. Nothing more is known of her fate, or Dirie's.

=== Raphael Hostey ===
Raphael Hostey was a rapper and graphic design student at Liverpool John Moores University when he left his wife and child and his home in Manchester to join ISIS in 2013. He traveled to Syria with other recruits from the Manchester area. He is believed to have been killed in an airstrike in Syria in the last week of April 2016, at the age of 24.

=== Ifthekar Jaman ===
Ifthekar Jaman was one of the first British fighters to travel to Syria to join ISIL, in May 2013. He was from Portsmouth. After his arrival in Syria, he posted photos and videos of his life in Syria on social media, calling it "five star jihad", and recruited five people from back home. These six Portsmouth IS fighters were the focus of a book, Alex Perry's Once Upon a Jihad. Jaman was killed by a tank in December 2013, in what was described by the Jamestown Foundation's Militant Leadership Monitor said was "apparently his first actual involvement in combat." His brothers back in Portsmouth subsequently faced criminal charges for assisting Jaman's recruits; one of them had plans to travel to Syria himself.

=== Jihadi John ===
Journalist James Foley was executed around 19 August 2014, on video by an ISIL member whose accent sounded English. The killer, Mohammed Emwazi, was described in the media as "Jihadi John".

=== Ali Kalantar ===
Kalantar was from Coventry and had been accepted to several universities before he left for Syria and ISIL in March 2014. He married sixteen-year-old Zahra Halane, a Danish national who left her residence in Britain with her twin sister Salma to join ISIL in June 2014. On December 4, 2014, Zahra tweeted that her husband Ali Kalantar had been killed. He was 19 years old at the time of his death. They had been married for only a few months.

=== Khalil brothers: Ahmed and Walid ===
Ahmed and Walid Khalil are two Afghan-British brothers who joined ISIL. Both men were British citizens who were born in Afghanistan but grew up near London. Walid joined ISIL first and married Halane. Ahmed tricked his new wife, Moroccan national Islam Mitat, into coming to Syria. He told her they were waiting on the paperwork to be processed so she could go to the UK to live with him. Shortly thereafter, Ahmed told Mitat he had gotten a job in Turkey and wanted to take her on vacation. In August 2014, Mitat and her husband flew to Istanbul where they were met by Walid. Ahmed told Mitat they were going to another city, to where his job was. Walid drove them to Gaziantep, which is near the Turkish/Syrian border, to a house full of men, women and children, and there Mitat found out they were going to Syria to join ISIL. Khalil told her this was the surprise and that he had married her to save her from the enemy. Mitat stated she had had no idea Khalil was an ISIL supporter prior to this; she described him as "a normal person".

After arrival in Syria, the couple went to Jarabulus to stay in a guest house for people moving to ISIL. Khalil went to do ISIL military training, leaving Mitat in the guest house, pregnant with their son. On 8 October 2014, on the first day of his first battle, Ahmed was killed in Kobani. Mitat moved in with Walid and his family after Ahmed's death. They lived in Raqqa, in an area known as "Little Britain" because so many British foreign fighters and their families lived there. Mitat subsequently remarried and had another child, then her second husband was killed. She escaped from ISIL territory in 2017 with her children and became an informant for British intelligence. She and the children were repatriated to Morocco. She said she was seeking British citizenship for her son, who is eligible for it through his father Walid Khalil, and hoped to move to the UK.

=== Aqsa Mahmood ===
Aqsa Mahmood, a Scottish Pakistani woman from Glasgow, was one of the first UK women to voluntarily travel into ISIL territory in Syria, in when she was 20 years old. The Militant Leadership Monitor named her as one of its "most dangerous women in jihad." Mahmood's parents came to believe she was convinced to join ISIL by Adeel Ulhaq. The journalist James Fergusson stated she was "groomed for jihad... online, over many years" by Ulhaq. In November 2013, Mahmood didn't come home one night. Her mother contacted one of Mahmood's university friends and was told Mahmood had gone to Syria. Azadeh Moaveni said she "was a classic example of cult-grooming because she lived so entirely in this interior life."

She kept in touch with her family over social media after arriving in Syria. She had a Tumblr blog called "Diary of a Mujahirah". Tumblr removed the blog in October 2015, two years after it was first published. Mahmood also used a Twitter account under the name Umm Layth, and urged Muslims to join ISIL or to commit terrorist acts, tweeting, "If you cannot make it to the battlefield then bring the battlefield to yourself." She published a guide on how to reach Syria, giving advice on what things people should take with them and how to avoid detection. Her parents made a public appeal for her to return home in September 2014, ten months after she left. On 28 September 2015 the United Nations placed her on its sanctions list, reserved for those with ties to Al Qaeda. UK authorities rescinded her passport, to prevent her return to the United Kingdom. Adeel Ulhaq was never charged in connection with Mahmood's case. But in 2016, he and two other British men were convicted of preparation of terrorist acts and Ulhaq was also convicted of funding terrorism, for helping a 17-year-old boy, Aseel Muthana, join ISIL. In February 2019, The Mirror reported that Mahmood was believed to have died in the war zone.

=== Asif Malik, Sara Kiran and four children ===
On 7 April 2015, Asif Malik, 31, and his partner Sara Kiran, 29, left their home in Slough, Berkshire with their four children, daughter aged 7 and sons aged 4, 2 and 1, left the UK and borded the ferry from Dover to Calais. Malik had previously been a member of the banned Islamist group al-Muhajiroun and its former leader, Anjem Choudary, described him as a "champion for sharia". On 19 April, police announced they were concerned the family were going to Syria, as they appeared to be travelling south across Europe by rail towards Turkey, they had left without sharing any travel plans with their loved ones, their landlord or their daughter's school, and Malik had expressed a wish to live in a Muslim country. On 20 April, the family was located in Turkey and detained. On 5 May, they were deported at their own request, not to the UK but to Moldova. The family did not provide a reason for wanting to be deported to Moldova. Concerned that the parents were going to take the children into ISIL, the family court in the UK made the children wards under the terms of the 1980 Hague Convention on the Civil Aspects of International Child Abduction and ordered the parents to surrender the family's passports to the British consulate. On 7 May the family agreed leave Moldova and return to the UK. The children remained wards of the court until October 2015, when an independent social worker assessed the family and said Malik and Kiran had experienced a "wake up call" and would no longer be likely to compromise their children's safety.

=== Mannan family: Nine adults and three children ===
Twelve members from three generations of the same British-Bangladeshi Muslim family who, in 2015, left their home in Luton, Bedfordshire, England together and disappeared, resurfacing two months later to announce they were with ISIL in Syria. The family members who left the UK included: Muhammed Abdul Mannan, 75; Minera Khatun, 53; Rajia Khanom, 21; Mohammed Toufique Hussain, 19; Mohammed Zayd Hussain, 25; Mohammed Abil Kashem Saker, 31; Sheida Khanam, 27; Mohammed Saleh Hussain, 26; Roshanara Begum, 24; and three children between 1 and 11 years of age who were never publicly named. Mohammed Abil Kashem Saker and Sheida Khanam were married to each other, but there are conflicting reports as to which of them was Mannan's natural child and which was his in-law. Mohammed Saleh Hussain and his wife Roshanara Begum were members of the extended family. The three minors included a son of the older couple, and two grandchildren of theirs. The family group includes the youngest and the oldest British people known to have gone to live in ISIL-controlled territory.

Muhammed Abdul Mannan was from Fenchuganj in Bangladesh. He moved to England in 1962 and worked in restaurants thereafter. He would visit the local mosque multiple times a day. His sons ran successful businesses as electricians and plumbers and were not strict Muslims. By 2015, Mannan had diabetes, and his wife, Minera Khatun, was suffering from throat cancer. The couple’s daughter, Rajia Khanom, had a different attitude than the rest of the family and was very strict with the others when it came to observing religious rules. She was also reportedly an active member of an unspecified Islamist organization, the head of their Luton branch. Authorities believe Khanom had links with the banned Islamist group Al-Muhajiroun, which had former members living in Luton. On 9 April 2015, the family was prevented from flying out of Heathrow Airport, and Khanom was questioned because she was suspected of intending to go to Syria. She was not arrested but the Bedfordshire Police did search the home she shared with her parents. After the authorities found no evidence that anyone in the family was heading to Syria, they were permitted to fly the next day. The family visited Bangladesh after leaving the UK. On 11 May, the family flew to Istanbul. They had return tickets to Heathrow for 14 May, but never arrived back in England. After their trip to Bangladesh, instead of going home, the family traveled to Syria and the Islamic State.

One of Mannan's sons left back in England, Shalim Hussain, told ITV News his father had been "tricked" and that Mannan had been calling from Syria, in tears. Shalim said the family was staying in an Istanbul hotel when a group of men came and asked to check their passports, then the family members were taken downstairs one by one, until only Mannan and his wife Khatun were left. The older couple asked what was happening and where their children and grandchildren were being taken, and the men told them not to worry and to go back to England without them. Mannan and Khatun refused to be separated from the rest of the family, so the men said to come with them. The family was then put in two different waiting vehicles and driven away to Syria. Shalim Hussain said he had seen "nothing unusual" prior to the family's departure from the UK and no signs that anyone in the family was an ISIL supporter. Shalim's brother Mohammed Akhtar Hussain, said, "If anyone had plans to go to Syria and join any groups there, it would have been my sister," Rajia Khanom.

Two months after the Mannans arrived in Syria, a British ISIL member passed on a press release to the BBC which was said to be from the Mannan family. The statement declared their allegience to ISIL and urged other Muslims to come to Syria. Their statement said the family was not being held against their will and felt “safer than we have ever felt before.” It included a photo of Mannan and Khatun taken in Syria. In the image, Mannan was pointing his index finger up, a hand gesture associated with ISIL, and Khatun was wearing a niqab, which was mandatory for women in ISIL territory. Shalim Hussain said the statement and photograph were “pure propaganda.”

British teenager Shamima Begum stated she befriended the seven surviving members of the Mannan family (five were dead by then) and that they decided to flee Islamic State territory together. She made it to a refugee camp, but the Mannans did not. This was reported in the ITV News podcast Shamima Begum: the Blame Game. In June 2019, it was reported that every member of the family group who had traveled to Syria was dead. Mannan and Khatun died of natural causes. Three of the younger men, including Mannan's sons, were killed fighting for ISIL. They all died before Begum encountered the family. Seven surviving family members, including the three children, were killed together in an airstrike when they tried to flee ISIL's last territorial stronghold in Baghuz.

=== Muthana brothers: Nasser and Aseel ===
Nasser and Aseel Muthana are two brothers from Cardiff, Wales who both joined ISIL. Nasser joined first, travelling to Syria at age 19 in November 2013. Aseel, age 17, followed him in February 2014. Both men have been sanctioned by the United Nations Security Council. Nasser is believed to have been killed in 2016. Aseel surfaced in Syrian prison in 2019 and said he wanted to return to the United Kingdom. He stated he had witnessed his brother's death in a drone strike. As of 2021, Aseel is imprisoned in Syrian Kurdistan.

=== Portsmouth jihadists ===
Five Bangladeshi-British men were recruited into IS in October 2013 by Ifthekar Jaman, another Portsmouth man who had joined IS earlier that year. The men were Assad Uzzaman, 25, Muhammad Hamidur Rahman, 25, Mamunur Mohammed Roshid, 24, Mashudur Choudhury, 31 and Muhammad Mehdi Hassan, 19. These six Portsmouth ISIL fighters were the focus of a book, Alex Perry's Once Upon a Jihad. The recruiter was killed within months and so were Rahman (in July 2014), Roshid and Massan (in October 2014). Uzzaman was killed in July 2015. Choudhury changed his mind and returned to Syria shortly after awhile, and was imprisoned on terrorism charges for his attempt to join IS.

=== Kadiza Sultana ===
Kadiza Sultana, age 16, left her home in London to join ISIL in February 2015 with two 15-year-old school friends from Bethnal Green Academy: Shamima Begum and Amira Abase. The three girls were collectively known as the Bethnal Green trio. They had been recruited by a friend, Sharmeena Begum (unrelated to Shamima), who travelled to Syria before they did. All three of the girls in the Bethnal Green trio married shortly after arriving in Syria. Sultana was said to have married an American ISIL fighter with Somali heritage, but wanted to return to the UK after he was killed in battle. She married a second time after her first husband was killed, and died with her second husband in a Russian airstrike in May 2016. Her family said in a phone interview with ITV in August 2016 she had been planning to escape ISIL territory. The lawyer who represents the families of the Bethnal Green trio, Tasnime Akunjee, told ITV that Sultana became too scared of making an escape attempt after another girl, Austrian national Samra Kesinovic, was beaten to death for trying to escape. In the podcast I’m Not a Monster, Shamima Begum stated she and Sharmeena Begum formally identified Sultana’s body and that it was “in pieces.”

=== University of Medical Sciences and Technology students ===
In 2015, dozens of students and recent graduates of the University of Medical Sciences and Technology (UMST) in Sudan disappeared in three different groups months apart in order to join the Islamic State (IS) in Libya and Syria. Most were British citizens of Sudanese origin, although their numbers also included Sudanese, Canadian and American citizens. Many of them were the offspring of doctors with roots in Sudan. Most of the recuits were in their twenties at the time they disappeared; the oldest was about thirty years old. Eleven of them disappeared from UMST in March 2015, to cross into Syria and join the Islamic State of Iraq and the Levant. A second group of about a dozen UMST people left in June to also join ISIL in Syria, while a group of five left UMST in August to travel to IS territory in Sirte, Libya.

One UMST student who had pledged allegiance to ISIL caliph Abu Bakr al-Baghdadi early in 2014 but never travelled to IS territories was Tarik Hassane, who was imprisoned in 2016 for his role in an IS-inspired drive-by shooting terror plot in London. By July 2016, it was reported that 40 people from UMST had joined IS. Many of these people were subsequently killed and the fates of many others are unknown or unrecorded. Only three are known to have survived: the twin sisters Abrar and Manar Abdel-Salam, who went to IS in Libya, and Nada Khider, who went to Syria and was detained with her baby in 2018 and given to the custody of the Sudanese embassy later that year.

=== Others ===
- Brides of the Islamic State#United Kingdom
- The Beatles (terrorist cell)
- Aine Davis
- Sally-Anne Jones
- Jack Letts

== Reactions ==
The British government proscribed ISIL as a terrorist organisation in June 2014. Previously, it had been proscribed as a part of Al-Qaeda. The government describes the group as follows:

ISIL is a brutal Sunni Islamist terrorist group active in Iraq and Syria. The group adheres to a global jihadist ideology, following an extreme interpretation of Islam, which is anti-Western and promotes sectarian violence. ISIL aims to establish an Islamic State governed by Shari'a law in the region and impose their rule on people using violence and extortion.

In August 2014, British Prime Minister David Cameron suggested that anybody displaying the black standard in the United Kingdom should be arrested.

Home Secretary Theresa May suggested new measures against radical preachers, stripping citizenship from naturalised Britons who fought for ISIL, and trying British-born ISIL members for engaging in terrorism abroad. Other figures, such as Mayor of London Boris Johnson, Conservative backbench MP David Davis, former archbishop of Canterbury Lord Carey and UKIP leader Nigel Farage have stated that all British citizens in ISIS should lose their citizenship. On 29 August 2014, the UK terror threat was raised from "substantial" to "severe".

Sir Malcolm Rifkind, a senior MP, advocated an alliance with President Bashar al-Assad of Syria to defeat ISIL. This was ruled out by Foreign Secretary Philip Hammond, who stated "We may very well find that we are aligned against a common enemy. But that does not make us able to trust them, it does not make us able to work with them and it would poison what we are trying to achieve in separating moderate Sunni opinion from the poisonous ideology of [ISIS] if we were to align ourselves with President Assad."

Royal Air Force Tornado jets and Chinook helicopters based in Cyprus have provided humanitarian aid to Yazidi refugees fleeing ISIL, as well as airlifts.
