= Yusra Hussien and Samya Dirie =

British-Somali teenagers who joined ISIL

Yusra Hussien
- Born: 1999
- Disappeared: September 2014 (aged 15); Bristol, England
- Education: City Academy Bristol
- Occupation: student
- Known for: Running from home to join the Islamic State

Yusra Hussien (born c. 1999) and Samya Dirie (born c. 1997) are two British-Somali women who, as teenagers on 24 September 2014, disappeared from their respective homes in Bristol and South London. They are known to have travelled together to Istanbul in Turkey, and are believed to have gone from there to the territory of the Islamic State of Iraq and the Levant in Syria.

Hussien was 15 years old at the time and had been recruited by Salma Halane, another teenager who had run away from home in England to join ISIL. Dirie was 17 years old. By the time they left the UK, up to 60 British women had travelled to Syria via Turkey to join ISIL. Hussien is believed to have been the youngest.

Samya Dirie
- Born: 1997
- Disappeared: September 2014 (aged 17); South London, England
- Occupation: student
- Known for: Running from home to join the Islamic State

== Life in England, Recruitment and Disappearance ==
Hussien was a year 11 student at City Academy Bristol at the time of her disappearance, with dreams of becoming a dentist. She got excellent grades in school. Her friends said she had seemed fine and had not expressed any radical views. Her parents last saw her when she left for school on the morning of 24 September 2014. She wasn't there when her father came to pick her up that afternoon.

Dirie is from Stockwell, South London. Her relatives said she was focused on her college studies and rarely worshipped at the mosque. Dirie left home on the morning of 24 September, saying she was going to her college. Her family realized her passport and some money was missing, so they contacted the college, which told them she had never arrived. The missing persons report for Dirie was filed three hours before her flight left Heathrow Airport, but the police were unable to stop her and Hussien from leaving. When they arrived at the airport they already had their tickets.

Dirie's father said his daughter did not know Hussien but speculated they might have chatted online. Hussien's aunt speculated "internet grooming" was behind her niece’s decision to leave for Syria.

After the two teenagers disappeared, Dirie contacted a cousin and said she was somewhere relatively safe. Hussien communicated with friends over Facebook and said she was safe and happy but wouldn't disclose where she was or what she was doing. The families of both girls made public appeals for them to return to the UK, telling them they would not be arrested.

In February 2015, Hussien, now 16 years old, was reported to have gotten married in Syria. There was speculation that Dirie and Hussien had been recruited by a dating service called "Jihadi Matchmaker". An analyst for the Middle East Media Research Institute said ISIL members had recruited spouses over social media such as Twitter, but increased content moderation and anti-terrorism authorities' surveillance of social media profiles may have prompted jihadists to turn to traditional dating websites to get married.

In an interview with the Manchester Evening News in 2017, Islam Mitat, a Moroccan woman who had been taken to ISIL territory against her will by her Afghan-British husband but had escaped, said she had lived in the same house as Salma Halane in Raqqa, ISIL’s Syrian capital, in an area known as "Little Britain" because so many British foreign fighters and their families lived there. Mitat's husband was Halane’s husband's brother. She identified Halane as the person who had recruited Hussien.

Nothing more is known of Hussien’s fate, or of Dirie's.

== See also ==
- Nora el-Bahty
- Ugbad and Rahma Sadiq
- Bethnal Green Trio
- Sabina Selimovic and Samra Kesinovic
- Ahmed, Salma and Zahra Halane
- Brides of the Islamic State
