= Raphael Hostey =

British ISIL recruiter and fighter from Manchester

Raphael Hostey

Raphael Hostey (1992 – May 2016), also known as Abu Qaqa al-Britani, was a British Islamic State of Iraq and the Levant recruiter and fighter from Manchester.

Hostey was a rapper and graphic design student at Liverpool John Moores University when he left his wife and child to join ISIS in 2013. He was part of a group of like-minded extremists in the Manchester area, including Salman Abedi and Ahmed Halane, and he traveled to Syria with other recruits. He later wrote that Ifthekar Jaman, an ISIL member from Portsmouth, was their guide and that his Manchester group joined up with a group of Portsmouth recruits whom Jaman knew.

During his time in Syria Hostey used social media, including Twitter, Tumblr and Ask.fm, to promote ISIL and recruit for it. He was reportedly part of a five-man team of recruiters which included Neil Prakash, and linked to Prakash's social media accounts. Hostey promised there would be "beautiful wives" for ISIL fighters. He is alleged to have recruited hundreds of people to ISIL, including Jamal Al-Harith who was reportedly a close friend of Hostey's father.

In February 2014, Hostey was shot in the foot in the fighting. He is believed to have been killed in an airstrike in Syria in the last week of April 2016, at the age of 24.

== See also ==
- Aine Davis
- Abu Qaqa
- Brighton jihadists
- Zafirr Golamaully
