= Nasser and Aseel Muthana =

Welsh brothers who joined Islamic State

Nasser Muthana
- Born: April 29, 1994 (age 32); Cardiff, Wales
- Other name: Abu Al-Yemeni Muthana
- Education: St. David's Catholic College
- Known for: One of the first British people to join the Islamic State
- Children: 1 or 2
- Status: missing and presumed dead as of 2016

Aseel Muthana
- Born: November 22, 1996 (age 29); Cardiff, Wales
- Other name: Abu Fariss
- Education: Fitzalan High School
- Known for: One of the first British people to join the Islamic State
- Spouse: Nasra Abdullahi Abukar
- Children: 2 (1 deceased)
- Status: imprisoned

Nasser Ahmed Muthana (born April 29, 1994) and Aseel Muthana (born November 22, 1996) are two brothers from Wales who travelled to Syria and joined the Islamic State of Iraq and the Levant as teenagers. Nasser joined first, travelling to Syria in November 2013. Aseel followed him in February 2014. The brothers were active on social media and Aseel has been interviewed several times by British media outlets. Both men have been sanctioned by the United Nations Security Council. Nasser is believed to have been killed in 2016. Aseel surfaced in Syrian prison in 2019 and said he wanted to return to the United Kingdom. As of 2021, Aseel is imprisoned in Syrian Kurdistan.

== Background and recruitment to ISIL ==
Nasser and Aseel were both born in Cardiff, Wales and grew up in the Butetown area of the city. Their father, Ahmed, is an electronics engineer born in Yemen, and they have two brothers. As children the boys attended St. Mary the Virgin Church in Wales Primary School and were high-achieving students. Ahmed described Nasser as "a regular Muslim, he was a normal person."

Before leaving the UK, Nasser attended St. David's Catholic College, got all A grades on his A-levels and planned to study medicine. He had been accepted by four universities. He had a temporary job with the Cardiff council.

Aseel was a sixth form student at Fitzalan High School and studying for his A-levels. He also worked at an ice cream parlour in Cardiff. He dreamed of becoming a teacher. Prior to his disappearance, Aseel was described as a "senior member" of a Cardiff-based gang that committed violent attacks. A former teacher at Fitzalan claimed there were extremist students at the school who bullied girls into wearing the hijab and saw terrorists as sympathetic figures, something the school denied.

Ahmed said he thought his sons had become radicalized by another person, whom he said had encouraged them to go to Syria and had given them the video game Call of Duty. The mosque where the brothers worshipped, Al Manar Centre, suggested they were radicalized online. Aseel and Nasser's brother said they "felt guilty about what was happening in Syria."

In November 2013, Nasser left his family's home, telling them he was going to a four-day seminar in Shrewsbury to prepare for university. He flew from London to Istanbul in Turkey, and from there he travelled to Syria. Three days after his departure, he called his family to tell him he had arrived. He later told Aseel that when he left he didn't actually know how to get across the Turkish border into Syria, and had used a Twitter account to contact Islamist fighters. One of them replied, helped him cross the border and got him to an ISIL camp. After three days there, Nasser pledged allegiance to Abu Bakr Al-Baghdadi and joined ISIL.

Aseel was interviewed by the Huffington Post in January 2014, and said Nasser was in Syria with ISIL and that "one was enough in the family." In spite of this, his parents worried that he would go to Syria also, and they took away his passport to stop him from leaving the country. He got a new passport.

In February 2014, Aseel quit his job at the ice cream parlour and followed Nasser to Syria via Cyprus and Turkey. Aseel was assisted in the planning and execution of his trip by his coworker and friend, Kristen Brekke, as well as two other British men, Adeel Ulhaq and Forhad Rahman. Brekke bought combat gear for Aseel online and stored them in his home, and let him use his computer to do research. Rahman used his Syrian contacts to help Aseel get there and let Aseel use his credit card to pay for a new passport, a bus ticket to Gatwick Airport and a flight to Cyprus. He also introduced him to Ulhaq, who used his own contacts in Syria to help Aseel in the later stages of his trip. Rahman stated he thought Aseel was going to Syria "to help people" and did not realize he was going to join ISIL.

== ISIL ==
Nasser took the nom de guerre "Abu Al-Yemeni Muthana" after he joined ISIL. He married a British-Bangladeshi woman. Ahmed stated Nasser had two sons; the BBC has reported that he has one son. Aseel took the nom de guerre "Abu Fariss" and married a British-Somali woman, 18-year-old Nasra Abdullahi Abukar, and they had two sons. The BBC reports that Aseel was married twice. The brothers lived in Raqqa, ISIL's Syrian capital. Because they spoke both Arabic and English, they worked as translators between Arabic and Western fighters. Nasser participated in several battles, including against Al-Nusra Front.

In June 2014, Nasser appeared in an ISIL propaganda video called "There is No Life Without Jihad" which featured six foreign fighters, three of them British, urging the world's Muslims to come to Syria and join ISIL. One of the other men in the video was a school friend of his from Cardiff, Reyaad Khan. In the video, Nasser said ISIL had fighters from as far away as Cambodia, Australia and the UK, and said, "We understand no borders... We will even go to Lebanon and Jordan with no problems". After the video appeared online, Ahmed Muthana was interviewed in the media and appealed to his sons to return home. He stated he felt Nasser had let both his family and his country down, and had "betrayed Great Britain". Nasser later called his mother and said ISIL had written the script for the video and forced him to appear in it.

Aseel was interviewed online by ITV News and BBC Wales in July, two weeks after the propaganda video with Nasser was posted online. He denied having been radicalized at his mosque in Wales and said Nasser had taught him about jihad when he was young. He said, "I was always pro-jihad but didn't approach the local imams or my parents because we knew it would brought us [sic] trouble." He said he had pledged allegiance to Abu Bakr Al-Baghdadi and would remain in Syria unless Baghdadi told him to go elsewhere, and that he had no intention of returning home. When asked about ISIL's brutality, he said, "jihad is obligatory," and that "If the state uses Sharia methods, I am 100% pro." He said he had no regrets about leaving the UK and was prepared to die for his cause.

In November 2014, Ahmed thought he recognised Nasser as one of the people standing alongside Mohammed Emwazi in an ISIL video showing aid worker Peter Kassig's severed head. Ahmed said, "I don't have sons now – that's how I feel about them. They would not be welcome back home." The Times, using facial recognition software, subsequently determined that Nasser was not the man in the video. In March 2015, the UK designated Nasser as a terrorist and froze his assets. In September, at the UK's request, the United Nations added him to their Al-Qaeda Sanctions List and the United States added him to their list of Specially Designated Nationals. A terrorism expert with Oxford Analytica described this as a "cosmetic measure". In September, Aseel was also added to the list. Ahmed called the sanctions "crazy", saying there were no assets to freeze.

Nasser had an active social media presence and regularly posted ISIL propaganda to his social media accounts, including photos of homemade bombs and weapons, and comments that the UK "should be afraid" of him if he were to return. When his brother arrived in Syria, Nasser tweeted that if a 17-year-old boy could do it, so could all Muslims. Aseel was also active online, on Kik and Ask.fm. In June 2014, he had an online question and answer session and told one person interested in joining ISIL to contact him directly so he could help them join.

In 2016, Brekke, Rahman and Ulhaq were convicted of preparation of terrorist acts and Ulhaq was also convicted of funding terrorism, for helping Aseel go to Syria. Brekke was sentenced to four and a half years in prison, Rahman to five years, and Ulhaq to six years. Before he left, Aseel exchanged affectionate texts with the men which had a flirtatious tone, calling them "babe", "cutie", and "habibi" (Arabic for 'darling') and saying he loved them. During the trial, because of these texts, Aseel's identity was initially kept anonymous out of fear that ISIL might decide to kill him for being gay; ISIL executed gay people by throwing them from the tops of tall buildings. Ulhaq was released in April 2018, but recalled only three days later for breaching the terms of his parole.

Nasser and Aseel kept in touch with their parents after travelling to Syria, and reportedly told Ahmed that ISIL had treated them badly, including by forcing them to marry, and that they regretted leaving Wales. At first they called home once a week, but the calls became less frequent as time passed. Islam Mitat, a Moroccan woman who had been taken to ISIL territory against her will by her Afghan-British husband but escaped and became an informant for British intelligence, said she met Nasser during this period and that he kept a Yazidi woman as his sexual slave.

The Independent mistakenly reported that Nasser was killed in an airstrike in 2015, but his parents continued to hear from him after that. In around 2017, the brothers stopped contacting their parents.

== After ISIL ==
In 2019, after ISIL lost the last of its territory at Battle of Baghuz Farqwani, Aseel resurfaced inside a Syrian prison, by then 22 years old. Since then he has been interviewed by multiple British media outlets. He denies having ever fought for ISIL and claims he only ever worked for them as a translator. Aseel's wife, Nasra Abdullahi Abukar, was sent to the Al-Hawl refugee camp with one of their sons after the fall of the ISIL caliphate, the other having been killed in an airstrike which also injured Aseel. She had had her British citizenship revoked in 2017 for joining ISIL. Her mother said she wanted to go to Somalia, where her father lived.

Aseel told ITV News that he and Nasser had joined ISIL "way before the caliphate was pronounced. Before all of these beheading videos, before all of the burnings happened, before any of that stuff. We came when [ISIL] propaganda and [ISIL] media was all about helping the poor, helping the Syrian people." He told Channel 4 News that he would not mind being imprisoned in the UK, even for an extended period, stating, "Anything is better than here. At least if I go back they will give you rights." He said he blamed only himself for his situation and hoped to be able to change his life. In an interview with The Independent, Aseel said Nasser was responsible for convincing him to come to Syria. He said he began to have doubts about ISIL once they started executing western hostages. He told the BBC in 2021, that "Islamic State, yeah, what they stood for was good," but that "individuals... did a lot of stuff that made the State look bad."

In an interview with the Mirror, when asked about ISIL's atrocities, Aseel said, "You see so much bloodshed on both sides... I stopped having an opinion." He expressed disappointment at having never witnessed any ISIL executions. Aseel told the Mirror that Nasser had been killed by a drone strike in Mosul, Iraq in February 2016, and that he himself had only been about fifty yards away at the time. Mohammed Ismail, the third British fighter who had appeared alongside Nasser in the "There Is No Life Without Jihad" video, was executed by ISIL as a spy a few months later, after confessing that he had passed on information about Nasser's whereabouts to western intelligence agencies.

In 2022, Brekke was sentenced to nine months in jail for four breaches of his release; he had failed to notify the police about two cars he was using and two financial accounts he had opened, something his lawyer characterized as "a couple of silly decisions over a short period of time". In 2024, Ulhaq was sentenced to two years and nine months in prison after pleading guilty to five counts of breaching the terms of his release. He had been required to keep the police informed of all new email addresses, bank accounts and phone numbers and had failed to do so. The parents of Aqsa Mahmood, a Scottish woman who joined ISIL in 2013, believe Ulhaq was also responsible for recruiting their daughter, but he has never been charged in her case.

== See also ==
- Talha Asmal, a 17-year-old British suicide bomber in ISIL
- Ifthekar Jaman, one of the earliest British ISIL fighters
- Ugbad and Rahma Sadiq, two Somali-Norwegian teenage sisters who joined ISIL
