= Disappearance of the Ameen family =

UK family thought to have joined ISIL

Ameen family
- Location: Syria
- Date: 2015
- Attack type: Missing persons
- Victims: 8

The Ameen family are eight members of the same British Pakistani family who left the Bradford in United Kingdom for Turkey in 2015 and disappeared; they are believed to have travelled to war-torn Syria.

They were speculated to have joined the Islamic State of Iraq and the Levant (ISIL). At the time, Turkey was a well-known transit country for foreigners attempting to travel to the war zone in Syria, where ISIL had declared a caliphate in June 2014. The Ameens were the second Bradford family who disappeared in 2015 and were believed to have travelled to Syria; the other family was the Dawoods.

First to disappear was 30-year-old Rehan Noor-Ul-Ameen, in June 2015; he traveled to Turkey and is thought to have crossed into Syria after that. In October that year, Rehan's brother Imran, his brother's wife Farzana and the couple's five children left their home in Bradford and also travelled to Turkey, like Rehan had. None of them ever returned.

== Life in Britain ==
The family members were Rehan Noor-Ul-Ameen, 30; his brother Imran Ameen, 39; Imran's wife and first cousin Farzana Ameen, 40; their 15-year-old daughter; and their sons, age 14, 11, 8, and 5.

Prior to their disappearances, Imran and Farzana Ameen and their children had never come to the attention of the police and were not on any watchlists. The family lived in the West Bowling area of Bradford in 2015. Many of their extended relatives lived in the same neighborhood. Imran's father was a barrister who lived next door to the couple. A first cousin lived across the street. Their cousin said the family prayed five times a day, but that the adults weren't particularly religious otherwise. He said Farzana had more English friends than Asian ones and did not wear a face veil.

In January 2007, Imran's younger brother Rehan, then 21, was the victim of an assault, kidnapping and attempted extortion. He was lured to a meeting with three men who beat him with bats and threatened to kill him unless he paid them £20,000. He was able to escape. Three days later, he encountered one of his attackers again, they exchanged blows and the man threatened Rehan with a gun. Rehan's three assailants subsequently pleaded guilty to various charges. A neighbour said Rehan became more religious after the assault, and eventually so did Imran, who grew a beard and changed his style of dress.

Imran and Farzana's three youngest sons attended St. Matthew's CE Primary School. The school's head teacher later said there was "no reason whatsoever to believe the children would be at risk." The couple's daughter and oldest son had been removed from Bradford Academy and were being homeschooled. Farzana also looked after her mother, who had had a stroke and was bedridden. Imran sold car parts online. He was associated with a number of websites. One of the websites listed in Imran's ad revenue account was Islamicmovements.com, which had articles about Islamist conflicts and pages for Osama bin Laden, Taliban leader Mullah Omar, Hamas and Hezbollah. The domain Islamicmovements.com was registered under another name, but with Imran's email address and his business's post office box.

A neighbor said shortly before the family's disappearance, Imran began making more frequent visits to the local madrasa. A week before her disappearance, Farzana travelled to Pakistan with her disabled mother and left her there with relatives. The couple's cousin said he felt "something was not right" but he did not suspect they had plans to go to Syria.

== Departures from Britain and disappearance ==
On 29 June 2015, Rehan Ameen flew out of Manchester Airport to Dalaman, Turkey. From there he is believed to have travelled to Syria. He did not return, but was not reported missing to the police.

On 29 September, Farzana and Imran withdrew their younger children from school, saying they were moving out of the area. They told various stories as to why they were leaving, including that they were taking a vacation in the Middle East, and that Imran had gotten a job offer from the UAE and they were going to Dubai to live.

On 6 October, the Ameen family travelled to Manchester Airport and flew to Antalya, Turkey on one-way tickets. Farzana contacted her brother in Pakistan on 13 October and left messages, saying that what she was doing was what was best for her children. That same day, the family was reported missing. Their cousin was "shocked" when he later found out they were believed to have gone to Syria, and the couple's great-uncle said the entire family was upset about what Farzana and Imran had done.

The Ameens were the second family who disappeared from the city of Bradford in 2015 and were believed to have travelled to Syria; the other family was the Dawoods, who went missing in May. There did not appear to be any links between the two families. In January 2016, the police launched a fresh appeal for information as to the whereabouts of the Ameen family and the Dawood family, who had still not returned. In August, both families were confirmed to still be missing.

== See also ==
- Disappearance of the Mannan family
- Ahmed, Salma and Zahra Halane
- Ugbad and Rahma Sadiq
