= Portsmouth jihadists =

Group of English men recruited by the Islamic State

The Portsmouth jihadists are five Bangladeshi British men from Portsmouth, England who came to Syria to join the Islamic State of Iraq and the Levant in October 2013. They had been recruited by another Portsmouth man, Ifthekar Jaman, who had traveled to Syria in May. Jaman was killed a few months later, and only one member of the Portsmouth cell survived.

The men were Assad Uzzaman, Muhammad Hamidur Rahman, Mamunur Mohammed Roshid, Mashudur Choudhury, and Muhammad Mehdi Hassan. They were the focus of a book, Alex Perry's Once Upon a Jihad. Criminal charges were laid against Jaman's brothers in connection with assisting the Portsmouth jihadists.

== Life in England ==
Little is known about Mamunur Mohammed Roshid, who was 24. Assad Uzzaman, 25, worked at Lloyds Bank. Muhammad Hamidur Rahman, also 25, worked at Primark. Muhammad Mehdi Hassan, 19, was attending sixth form college repeating one of his A-levels. He had excelled academically and had plans to study international politics at the University of Surrey. Mashudur Choudhury, 31, the oldest of the men, was married with two children and would later be described as a "serial liar". He said his failings and his lies, which included faking cancer, had made him "utterly ashamed and embarrassed".

In the months before the group traveled, the five men had all been active in the Portsmouth Dawah Team, distributing pamphlets and copies of the Quran. All had attended the Jami Mosque in Portsmouth. Ifthekar Jaman had also been on the Portsmouth Dawah team and knew all of the men; Uzzaman was his cousin.

In May 2013, Jaman quit his job and left the UK alone. He went to Syria and joined ISIL after being rejected from Al-Nusra Front. Jaman posted photos and videos of his life in Syria on Facebook, Twitter and Instagram, calling it "five star jihad" and encouraging Muslims, including his friends back in England, to come to Syria. He recruited his friends back in Portsmouth in October 2013. They called themselves the "al-Britani Brigade Bangladeshi Bad Boys" and some in the press called them the "Pompey lads".

== Departure for ISIL and consequences ==
The five men left on the pretense that they were taking a trip to Turkey. Hassan told his mother he would only be gone for three months and told her to instruct his college he would return to take his exams. Rahman told his family he was going to travel to the Syrian border region as part of a humanitarian aid convoy, and tweeted that he felt "called by God to help Muslims being killed by President Bashar al-Assad."

They flew out of Gatwick Airport and travelled to Reyhanli, a Turkish town on the Syrian border where they met with a group of three other British men who were from Manchester, one of whom was Raphael Hostey. Jaman had asked the Portsmouth group to meet the Manchester group and vet them. After meeting one another, the two groups contacted Jaman, who helped them cross the border into Syria.

Choudhury returned to Britain shortly after his arrival in Syria. He said after witnessing the war-torn situation, he changed his mind and returned home while the younger men went to join an ISIL military training camp. In May 2014 he was convicted of engaging in conduct in preparation of terrorist acts; his was the first British conviction for a terror offense related to the Syrian civil war. Choudhury was sentenced to four years. He served less than half his sentence.

Jaman was killed by a tank near the city of Deir ez-Zor in December 2013, a few months after the arrival of the recruits from Portsmouth and Manchester. Rahman was killed in Deir ez-Zor in July 2014.

Hassan adopted the nom de guerre "Abu Dujana" in Syria. He kept in touch with his family, calling home every few months. He married Sumaiyyah Wakil, a 16-year-old girl who had run away from her British-Bangladeshi family of ten siblings in August 2014 and gone to Syria, leaving a note telling her family she wanted to be a martyr. Hassan was killed in October 2014, during the ISIL offensive to capture Kobane. His family released a statement saying they had no idea he had planned to go to Syria and that they had a "good heart" and wanted to "help Syrians." Wakil miscarried his child. Hassan would later be featured in a 2021 documentary, Secrets of an ISIS Smartphone.

Roshid was killed the same month as Hassan, on October 17. By this point, at least five British people were travelling to Iraq and Syria to join ISIL every week.

The story of Jaman and the Portsmouth recruits was told in Alex Perry's book Once Upon a Jihad: Life and Death with the Young and Radicalised, which came out in January 2015. Uzzaman, the last survivor left in Syria, who took the nom de guerre "Abu Abdullah", was killed in July 2015. Photos of his body circulated on social media after his death.

== Criminal charges laid against relatives ==
In 2015, Ifthekar Jaman's brothers back in England, Mustakim Jaman and Tuhin Shahensha, were both charged with preparing terrorist acts for providing assistance for the five Portsmouth men in traveling to Syria, including using their bank accounts to transfer money. Jurors at their first trial, in May, had been unable to reach a verdict. In October, the two men were convicted. Tuhin Shahensha was also convicted of preparing to travel to Syria himself. A counterterrorism police officer said the brothers had not had plans to attack the UK. They were sentenced to six years each in prison.

Both of Jaman's brothers changed their names after their convictions. Both men have been jailed since their name changes for failure to comply with the terms of a Part 4 Terrorist Notification Order under Section 54 of the Counter-Terrorism Act 2008.

== See also ==
- University of Medical Sciences and Technology disappearances, dozens of medical students and recent graduates who joined ISIL
- Tomasa Pérez Molleja, a Spanish woman who joined ISIL with her children
- Bethnal Green trio, three British schoolgirls who joined ISIL
- Khaled Sharrouf, an Australian man who joined ISIL with his wife and children
- Disappearance of the Dawood family, 13 members of the same family who disappeared and may have joined ISIL
- Brighton jihadists, 5 men from Brighton who went to fight Syria
