= Brighton jihadists =

5 young men from Brighton, UK who joined Al-Nusra Front in Syria

The Brighton jihadists are five young men, four of them in their teens and three of them brothers, from the Brighton, England area who travelled to Syria in 2013 and 2014 to fight in their civil war and joined the jihadist group Al-Nusra Front. They were Ibrahim Kamara, Mohammed Raja Khan, and Abdullah, Jaffar and Amer Deghayes. They are the subject of a book, Mark Townsend's No Return: The True Story of How Martyrs Are Made. Three of the jihadists were killed within months and a fourth was killed in 2016. As of 2020, only Amer Deghayes is still alive.

== Background ==
Amer, Abdullah and Jaffar Deghayes were born in the UK, as were their sister and two brothers. They were the children of Libyan immigrants who got asylum. They lived in Saltdean, where they were the village's only Muslim family. Their grandfather was arrested in Libya before the boys were born and died in custody, believed to have been extrajudicially executed. Their uncle, Omar Deghayes, was held by the United States as an enemy combatant at Guantanamo Bay detention camp from 2002 until 18 December 2007, when he was released without charge and returned to Britain.

In 2010, social services got involved with the family and the five boys got a child protection order prohibiting their father, Abubaker, from contacting them due to his alleged domestic violence against them and their mother. Abubaker made his sons get up at 4:30 a.m. to study the Quran and would beat them, sometimes with an electric wire, if he didn't think they were doing a good job. The boys were also the victims of racist and Islamophobic bullying at school and in their neighborhood, sometimes having to call the police as often as three times a week to report incidents. Abubaker said the living room window was broken four times. Death threats were made against members of the family, the National Front set up a chapter in Saltdean with the intention of harassing them, and the English Defense League and Casuals United invited their supporters to target the family's home, publishing their address on right-wing websites. No one was ever prosecuted.

Ibrahim "Ibby" Kamara's family is from Sierra Leone and had moved to Bevendean in Brighton in 2004; they were the only black family there. He was Amer Deghayes's best friend; they had been friends since 2009. Kamara and his family had also been subject to racist and Islamophobic abuse, and his mother gave the names and addresses of offenders to the police. At one point the family was moved to a safe house in a nearby town after Kamara's ten-year-old brother was threatened, but no one was ever arrested.

In 2011, the Deghayes parents divorced and the mother and children left Saltdean and moved to a council flat in Brighton. Amer was a dedicated student and studied business at sixth form college, but his younger brothers were excluded from school, joined a local street gang and got involved in criminal activity, including shoplifting and selling drugs. Beginning in 2013, the boys and others in their gang began spending time at a gym in a local mosque, and started watching videos about the Syrian civil war, which is how they found out about Al-Nusra Front. Amer began watching YouTube videos of the jihadist cleric Anwar al-Awlaki. He decided to go to Syria to help suffering Muslims.

== Departure for Syria and deaths ==
The day before he left, 19-year-old Amer told his mother he was going to visit relatives in Libya and needed his passport. On October 8, 2013, he left with his father and a friend, Mohammed Raja "Mo" Khan, on a humanitarian aid convoy. They volunteered at a refugee camp in Atme. The convoy, including Amer, left Syria on October 22 to return to Britain. At the airport in Turkey, Amer and Khan told the rest of the group they had decided to go to Libya to visit Amer's family. Instead, they left the airport and went back to the Syrian border, which was controlled by Al-Nusra, and after they told the border guards they wanted to join the fight against Bashar al-Assad, they were escorted to a training camp.

In a 2014 interview with ITV News, Amer said he had promised Allah that he would take part in the jihad "until I get killed." Khan had a "meteoric" rise within Al-Nusra as an emir, according to Farhad Khosrokhavar's book Jihadism in Europe: European Youth and the New Caliphate. Little is known about him compared to Kamara and the Deghayes brothers. He was Bangladeshi-British.

Amer's brothers and friends had wanted to join him on his trip to Syria but couldn't due to lack of space in the convoy. Kamara's mother realized he had been radicalized and asked him to leave the family home in December 2013 because she did not want him influencing his younger brothers. She refused to renew his passport because she feared he would use it to travel to Syria. Kamara was placed in a foster home with a Christian couple.

In early 2014, Amer's brothers, 16-year-old Jaffar and 17-year-old Abdullah, as well as Kamara, decided to go to Syria to fight as well. They left together on January 28. The two other Deghayes sons remained behind. Kamara travelled on his younger brother's passport.

Jaffar and Abdullah's departure was a "total surprise and shock" to social workers and police who were monitoring the family and had previously assessed Jaffar's risk of radicalization and determined he was "not at risk of being drawn into terror related activities." When Abubaker realized his sons had gone, he called friends in Atme who tracked them down, then he traveled to the Turkish border to confront them and beg them to come home, but they refused.

Abdullah turned 18 on April 5, 2014. Six days later, he was killed in battle by a sniper. He died in Kassab, Lakatia governorate, near the Turkish border. Amer was wounded in the same firefight, shot in the stomach. He told Vice News that Abdullah "was killed for a really good cause and his death was a sign of martyrdom." Abubaker said his son had died fighting for "a just cause." He said his children had gone to Syria for humanitarian reasons and had not been involved in radical groups in Britain.

In September, Kamara was killed in an airstrike in Aleppo; he was 19 at the time of his death. He had used the nom de guerre "Khalil" in Syria. He is believed to be the first British national to die in an American airstrike in Syria. His mother wrote a letter of complaint to Britain's Home Office, asking why Kamara had been able to travel on his 15-year-old brother's passport when he did not resemble his brother and his brother was too young to fly unaccompanied. She later stated she got no explanation and said, "What made me angry was that nothing was done about it. My son was just another dead jihadi. They let them go to die."

In October 2014, Jaffar was killed near Aleppo at age 17. Some reports state he was the youngest jihadist to die in Syria at the time. Amer spoke about his brothers' and Kamara's deaths when he was interviewed for Danish journalist Nagieb Khaja's book Du må ikke græde – for så mister du blod. He said that, although he missed them, he did not dwell on his loss and he was happy for them because they had achieved martyrdom.

On October 31, 2016, Khan was killed by shelling in the Hamadiyah district of Aleppo, at the age of 22.

== Fate of Deghayes family members ==
Abdullah Deghayes had had a twin brother, Abdulrahman, called Abdul, who remained behind in Britain when the others left. In February 2019, Abdul was stabbed to death in a drug-related homicide; he was 22 years old. A suspect was later convicted of his murder.

In the spring of 2020, Amer Deghayes, the only surviving member of the original five Brighton jihadists, lived in Idlib, Syria with his wife, a Syrian national, and their daughter. He had left Al-Nusra Front some years earlier. Amer stated he found comfort in family life after the deaths of his brothers and friends.

In 2021, the Deghayes brothers' father, Abubaker, was charged with encouraging the commission, preparation or instigation of acts of terrorism. This was in connection with a speech he gave about armed jihad at a mosque in November 2020; he called it "compulsory." His attorney stated Abubaker had not intended to encourage terrorism. The judge called his speech "reckless" and sentenced him to four years in prison. His sentence was later reduced by one year.

== See also ==
- Abdul Waheed Majeed
- Portsmouth jihadists
- Bethnal Green trio
- University of Medical Sciences and Technology disappearances
