= Connell Sixth Form College =

Connell Co-op College

Location
- 301 Alan Turing Way; Manchester, M11 3BS; United Kingdom; 53.478°N 2.193°W

Information
- Type: Sixth form college
- Established: 2013 (Tuition began); 2014 (Facilities opened)
- Founder: Manchester City F.C.
- Local authority: Manchester
- Department for Education URN: 139730 Tables
- Ofsted: Reports
- Principal: Emma Soper
- Gender: Mixed
- Age: 16 to 19
- Enrolment: 420–600 (2014 onwards)
- Website: connell.ac.uk

Connell Co-op College is a sixth form college in the Beswick Hub development, Manchester. Run by the Co-op Academies Trust and formerly the Bright Futures Educational Trust (BFET), the college is located on the Etihad Campus training ground built by Manchester City Football Club as part of their redevelopment plans. The college is named after the Connell family, who were active in their local community in the 1880s and who created the church youth team, which eventually morphed into the Premier League side. The college also serves the secondary purpose of educating members of their youth team, who will be allocated some places to complete their secondary education.

In addition to teaching the customary range of A-Level courses, the college also offers BTECs in business, science, and sport science.

== History ==
The sixth form college was one of three new free schools to be approved by Education Minister Michael Gove in July 2012, when the name of the educational facility was revealed to be Connell Co-op College, a tribute to the Connell family of Gorton, who founded Manchester City F.C. (in its first incarnation as a church youth team) in the latter part of the 19th century. The announcement also unveiled the link between the new college and Altrincham Grammar School for Girls, which proposed the initiative and had been asked to handle the management and recruitment of staff. Later the same year, Manchester City Football Club announced that the area around the college was to be part of a larger redevelopment, with commercial space as well as community leisure facilities.

In July 2018, the college left the Bright Futures Educational Trust (BFET) after government intervention in 2017. The Co-op Academies Trust was chosen to run the college, and stated there were no plans for redundancies at the college.

== Notable alumni ==
- Sophie Capewell, cyclist
- Ellie Roebuck, Manchester City and England association football goalkeeper
- Salma and Zahra Halane
