= Sabina Selimovic and Samra Kesinovic =

Austrian teenagers who joined ISIL

Sabina Selimovic
- Born: 16 February 1999; Austria
- Disappeared: 10 April 2014 (aged 15); Vienna, Austria
- Known for: Running from home to join the Islamic State

Samra Kesinovic
- Born: 25 September 1997; Austria
- Disappeared: 10 April 2014 (aged 16); Vienna, Austria
- Known for: Running from home to join the Islamic State

Sabina Selimovic (c. 16 February 1999 – unknown), and Samra Kesinovic (c. 25 September 1997 – unknown), were two teenaged Austrian nationals who, at the height of the ascendancy of the Islamic State of Iraq and the Levant militia's conquests in the Middle East in April 2014, abandoned their family homes in Central Europe and illicitly travelled to Syria to join it. Their actions drew substantial media commentary due to the ongoing media reports of en masse barbarity that the Islamic State forces were engaging in, and raised questions as to why people of European extraction would be drawn to such an entity.

== Background ==
Selimovic and Kesinovic were born in Austria to Bosniak immigrants who had fled the Bosnian War in the 1990s. The Selimovics are originally from Zvornik and Kesinovic’s family is from Brčko. Both girls lived with their families in stable homes in the working-class area of Favoriten in Vienna. Their mothers would not allow them to wear the jilbab, but they did wear the headscarf. They are thought to have become radicalized after attending a local Salafist mosque in Vienna and reading about jihad on the internet. They were close friends with a slightly older Chechnyan-born boy who would also join ISIL in Syria; he died there.

== Departure to join the Islamic State ==
On 10 April 2014, the pair left their homes in Vienna, illicitly, without telling their families of their intentions, leaving a note for their parents stating: "Don't look for us. We will serve Allah and we will die for him." They then travelled via Turkey to Syria, entering it through its northern border, wherein they entered Islamic State controlled territory. Their uncle said the family had had no idea of the girls’ intentions and suggested they had been “tricked”. He said, “They were normal girls until their recent involvement with local problem boys.” The girls had taken only one backpack and contacted their families requesting additional clothing. Selimovic’s father travelled to the Turkish border and delivered clothes to a Chechen couple to give to her and Kesinovic.

The pair posted photographs from Islamic State territory on social media websites for jihadist propaganda. An open letter was published that month, supposedly by Sabina Selimovic. She said she was comfortable in Syria, urged other Muslim women to follow her, and tried to explain her decision. She said, “I lived in Vienna, until Allah called me, and I responded to the call and set out on an honorable path […] we have everything here and we enjoy it, we are not afraid of death. I invite you wherever you are, my dear sisters, to jihad in the way of Allah.”

Information obtained by the French news magazine Paris Match shortly afterwards disclosed that the two girls had both married Chechen jihadists, and that they had expressed fears of imprisonment back in Austria for their activities on social media as Islamic State propagandists should they return home. Heute reported they could face five years in prison. A close female friend from Austria who kept in touch with the girls daily after their departure said their husbands were both 24-year-old Chechens and that they lived in adjoining apartments and had asked her to come to Syria to live. Selimovic’s mother, Senada Selimovic, said her daughter married twice, first to a man from Turkey and then, after his death, to a man from Switzerland of Kosovo extraction. Sabina had one son by each man. She kept in touch with her mother by phone.

In October 2015, Selimovic gave an interview with Paris Match, entirely by text message. She denied she was pregnant and said she had access to the same halal food as at home and felt free to practice her religion in Syria, unlike in Vienna. Authorities dismissed the interview as ISIL propaganda, noting recent reports that Selimovic and Kesinovic had made inquiries about returning home to Austria.

By November 2015, Samra Kesinovic had reportedly given birth to a child.

== Purported deaths ==
An article stated incorrectly that Selimovic had been killed around September 2014 at the age of 16 during fighting in Syria. She was in fact still alive.

In late 2015, it was reported by the Middle East bureau of The Daily Telegraph newspaper that Kesinovic had been beaten to death after being caught by Islamic State forces whilst trying to escape from the city of Raqqa.

The Austrian Foreign Ministry and the Federal Office for the Protection of the Constitution and Counterterrorism (BVT) would not comment on the story of Kesinovic’s death. In February 2019, The Mirror, citing anonymous Austrian intelligence sources, said the story of Kesinovic’s brutal death was a lie which had been intentionally circulated to cover her escape from ISIL into hiding, and that she and Selimovic were alive in a camp near the city of Idlib.

Sabina Selimovic last spoke her mother, Senada, on March 10, 2019. This was during ISIL’s territorial last stand at Baghuz. Her mother subsequently learned that Sabina was wounded in the arm while approaching Kurdish forces to surrender and, unable to go on, gave her children to some other women who were with her. She asked the women to save her children and gave them Senada’s Austrian phone number. Senada went to the Al-Hawl refugee camp and found her grandchildren there with the women Sabina had entrusted them to. She stated she saw Sabina at Al-Hawl too, wearing a niqab, but wasn’t able to meet or speak with her.

Sabina’s sons were sent to Austria to live with her parents after a DNA test confirmed their kinship.

Samra Kesinovic has not resurfaced since the reports of her death in 2015. Senada was not able to locate her daughter Sabina Selimovic since she believes she saw her in Al-Hawl. She said has she never believed her daughter was dead. As of July 2026, Senada says she has spent €30,000 on the search for Sabina.

== Possible 2026 video identification ==
Senada Selimovic believes she recognized her daughter Sabina on a video of a women and children leaving a Raqqa detention facility, which was broadcast in January 2026. The Austrian Foreign Ministry said it was not possible to identify the people in the video due to its poor quality, nor could they determine when the video was made. They stated, “At the moment we have no verified information about the status of Ms. Selimovic.”

== See also ==
- List of people who disappeared mysteriously (2000–present)
- Shamima Begum
- Sharmeena Begum
- Nora el-Bahty
- Bird of Jannah
- Aqsa Mahmood
- Ugbad and Rahma Sadiq
- Bethnal Green Trio
- Linda Wenzel
