= Islam Mitat =

Woman tricked into joining ISIS

- Born: 1993 (age 32–33); Oujda, Morocco
- Known for: being tricked into traveling to Islamic State territory in Syria
- Children: 2

Islam Mitat (born 1993) is a Moroccan woman who was tricked by her husband into traveling to Syria to join the Islamic State of Iraq and the Levant in 2014. After her escape from ISIL territory in 2017, she gave numerous media interviews. Her story was covered on 60 Minutes Australia in an episode titled "ISIS Bride, Aussie baby". There is also an Italian graphic novel about her.

== Background, marriage and journey to the Islamic State ==
Islam Mitat is from Oujda, Morocco and had dreams of becoming a fashion designer. Her father is a retired member of the Moroccan king's guard. She met her husband, Ahmed Khalil, on the Muslim dating website Muslima.com. Mitat was 19 years old at the time. Khalil was born in Kabul, Afghanistan and had moved to Britain and become a British citizen by the time he and Mitat met online. Months later, Khalil traveled to Morocco and proposed marriage, showing Mitat's family his bank statements to prove the seriousness of his intentions. After marrying, the couple went to Dubai, then to meet Khalil's family in Jalalabad, Afghanistan. They stayed in Afghanistan for a month. Mitat went back to Morocco and Khalil went to Dubai. He told her they were waiting on the paperwork to be processed so she could go to the UK to live with him.

Shortly thereafter, Khalil told Mitat he had gotten a job in Turkey and wanted to take her on vacation. He told her he had a surprise and would give it to her in Turkey. In August 2014, Mitat and her husband flew to Istanbul where they were met by a Turkish-speaking driver. Khalil told Mitat they were going to another city, to where his job was.

Their driver took them to Gaziantep, which is near the Turkish/Syrian border, to a house full of men, women and children, all dressed in black. Mitat was confused and asked one of the women what was going on, and she said they were “going to Syria and going hijrah” meaning joining ISIL. Khalil told her this was the surprise and that he had married her to save her from the enemy. Mitat told her husband she didn't want to go to Syria, and he said, "You are my wife and you have to obey me." She thought when they reached the Syrian border she could ask for help from the Turkish border guards, but when they approached the border the guards opened fire on them and they ran into Syria. One of the people in their group running across the border was shot in the leg.

Mitat stated she had had no idea Khalil was an ISIL supporter prior to this; she described him as "a normal person" and said, "I thought he had a way of thinking like a British person. He promised me something but it was all a lie. I can't trust anyone again, especially men."

== ISIL and escape ==
After arrival in Syria, the couple went to Jarabulus to stay in a guest house for people moving to ISIL. Mitat said people of nationalities from all the world were staying there. Khalil went to do military training, leaving Mitat in the guest house, pregnant. On 8 October 2014, on the first day of his first battle, Khalil was killed in Kobani. His brother and his brother's family had also joined ISIL, and Mitat moved in with them after her husband's death.

They lived in Raqqa, ISIL's Syrian capital, in an area known as "Little Britain" because so many British foreign fighters and their families lived there. Mitat's brother-in-law was married to a 16-year-old girl who had run away from home in Manchester, England with her twin sister to join ISIL. The two twin sisters spent a lot of time together and they taught Mitat how to speak English. Mitat stated the girls had "crowed" over news of terrorist attacks in Europe and that her sister-in-law had helped recruit a 15-year-old girl from Bristol into ISIL. Mitat said as the number of airstrikes increased in Raqqa, her sister-in-law bought a car and spoke of plans to leave the war-torn city and travel deeper into ISIL territory.

During this period Mitat also had encounters with British ISIL members Sally-Anne Jones, Khadijah Dare, Aine Davis, Nasser Muthana, and the Bethnal Green trio, and with Australian member Zehra Duman. She said she considered the women she met to be more dangerous than the men, since they might denounce her for spying if they sensed she was not an ISIL supporter. She befriended an enslaved Yazidi woman named Waheida and wanted to buy her so she could set her free, but Waheida's enslaver wanted $5,000 for her and Mitat only had $2,000.

After Mitat's brother-in-law was killed, Mitat moved into an ISIL guest house and stayed there until the birth of her son a few months later. ISIL made her marry again, to a friend of her first husband with the nom de guerre Abu Talha Al-Almani. Mitat wanted to escape ISIL territory and planned to befriend local Syrians and ask for their help, but Al-Almani would not let her leave the house. Mitat eventually divorced him.

She had to marry a third time, and with her sister-in-law’s help she met a man with the nom de guerre Abu Abdallah Al-Afghani, an Indian-Australian whom Mitat described as a "gentle soul". His real name was Faisal Sahib and he was born to a moderate Muslim family in Sydney. He was a kickboxing champion and medical student when, at age 21, he traveled to Syria and ISIL in 2013, without the knowledge of his family and friends and without revealing his reasons for doing so. Sahib also wanted to leave ISIL, according to Mitat; she stated, “He came to help the Muslims. But he told me when he came he was shocked. Because what they told him was just a lie. He told me his missed his life. He missed boxing.” With his help and approval, Mitat began befriending local Syrian people; she planned to ask them for help to get out of ISIL. Sahib spent much of his time at home as he was recovering from an injury. Mitat had a second child, a daughter.

When Sahib had fully recovered, ISIL sent him to the front lines. He was killed in an airstrike during the defense of Tabqa, and Mitat sold all her possessions and used the money to pay to get herself and her children smuggled out of ISIL territory. She asked her Syrian neighbours for help. Mitat's neighbours disguised her as a local woman and traveled with her through numerous ISIL checkpoints, pretending they were going to a wedding, when in fact they were delivering her and her children to a people smuggler.

Mitat carried her children for nine hours on foot through the desert until Kurdish YPG forces found them. The enslaved Yazidi woman Waheida also escaped with them. After she and Mitat surrendered to the YPG, Waheida vouched for Mitat and told them that she had opposed ISIL. Mitat was interrogated by intelligence officers and they came to believe her story. She began cooperating with British intelligence as soon as she left the ISIL caliphate, telling them about her life in ISIL territory and what she knew about the people living there.

By the autumn of 2017, Mitat had been repatriated to Morocco with the children. She said she did not want to remain in Oujda as too many people there knew about her past and she feared her children would be stigmatized as "cubs of the caliphate." She said she was seeking British citizenship for her son, who is eligible for it through his father, and hoped to move to the UK. She could also seek Australian citizenship for her daughter, who is eligible through her father, and move there. This was discussed on 60 Minutes Australia in an episode titled "ISIS Bride, Aussie baby". Mitat stated she did not plan to tell her children who their fathers had been, to avoid traumatizing them further.

Mitat’s story is told in an Italian graphic novel, Io non sono Islam (“I am not Islam”) by Benedetta Argentieri, which came out in 2019.

== See also ==
- Mariam Dabboussy
- Samantha Sally
- Gailon Su and Su-lay su
