= Khadijah Dare =

British woman who joined ISIL in 2013

- Born: Grace Dare; 1991 (age 34–35); United Kingdom
- Education: Lewisham College
- Occupation: student
- Known for: British woman who joined ISIL and let her son appear in propaganda videos
- Spouse: Abdul Ghameed Abbas
- Children: 2

Khadijah Dare, born Grace Dare c. 1991, is a British-Nigerian woman who travelled to Syria in 2013 and eventually joined the Islamic State of Iraq and the Levant. She appeared on Channel 4 with her husband that year. In January 2016, her four-year-old son appeared in an ISIL propaganda video called "A Message to David Cameron" where five people were killed. In February that year, he appeared in a second video, where he pressed a detonator and blew up a car with three people inside it. The propaganda videos attracted considerable attention, and both David Cameron and Boris Johnson commented on them.

== Background, conversion and marriages ==
Dare was born Grace Dare to a Pentecostal Christian family of Nigerian descent. Her family was religious and she was devout growing up; she attended church three times a week and frequently prayed and read the Bible. She grew up in Lewisham, London and attended Sydenham School. Her friends recalled her as a popular student but one whose behaviour was disruptive. She would later say her family was poor by British standards, but that her life had been comfortable.

After getting her GCSEs she enrolled in Lewisham College to study psychology and media. Just before turning 18, she converted to Islam. She took the name Khadijah Dare, and began to wear the niqab. People who knew her said she took her Muslim faith very seriously and practiced it consistently. Dare later said she experienced discrimination in the UK after she started wearing the niqab.

In 2010, while still a teenager, Dare married a waiter of Turkish Cypriot descent who was described as a "passive character". They met at the Lewisham Islamic Centre. It was the same mosque as that attended by future jihadi Siddartha Dhar. The Standard noted in July 2014, “There is no suggestion that anyone at Lewisham Islamic Centre has harmed or misguided Dare in any way — in fact… radicals [may] operate independently of the centre.”

Dare and her first husband had a son. Her friends were concerned about her mental health and said she would leave her baby in random places in the mosque. Her father said he made three calls to the police about her behaviour and warned the police they should watch her. She left her first husband because he refused to go fight in the Syrian civil war. By the time of their son’s birth in May 2011, the couple was separated. They subsequently divorced.

In 2013, when she was 22, Dare married her second husband, Swedish-Iraqi jihadi Abdul Ghameed Abbas, online, then travelled to Syria with her son to join him. When her mother dropped them off at the airport, she thought her daughter and grandson were going for a short trip to Egypt or Turkey. Dare’s first husband had also not known that Dare would be taking their son to Syria, and when he found out, he tried to go there to retrieve the child. He travelled as far as Cyprus, but his family convinced him to turn back, saying it was too dangerous to go further.

== ISIL ==
In her book Invisible Martyrs: Inside the Secret World of Female Islamic Radicals, Farhana Qazi says Dare was one of the first British women to travel to the Syrian civil war. After her arrival in Syria, Dare was active on Twitter and Facebook under the name "Muhajirah fi Sham", which means “immigrant in Syria”, and urging other Muslims to come "join da [sic] caravan to where the laws of Allah". She praised ISIL’s murder of their American hostage James Foley and tweeted a request for links to media of his execution. She had a photo of her son holding an AK-47 as her Twitter profile picture. After Dare’s tweet about Foley’s murder, the Lewisham Islamic Centre put out a statement saying Dare had previously attended the mosque but that her “grossly crude and insensitive comments” had nothing to do with the mosque or its staff and did not reflect its teachings.

Dare, her son and Abbas, who went by the nom de guerre Abu Bakr, appeared on Channel 4 in the summer of 2013, a few months into their marriage, and talked about their lives. The footage was shot by Bilal Abdul Kareem at the couple's home outside of Aleppo. At the time, Abbas was fighting with the jihadi militia Katiba al Muhajireen, earning roughly $150 a month. For the interview, Dare, who called herself "Maryam", shot a Kalashnikov and a revolver. She explained she was not a frontline fighter and the weapons were for self-defence. Regarding her marriage she said, "I couldn’t find anyone in the UK who was willing to just sacrifice their life in this world for the life in the hereafter... Allah ruled that I came here to marry Abu Bakr." She said she had no intention of ever returning to the UK. Abbas said Dare was pregnant and he hoped he would be able to meet the baby before he died. When the Channel 4 footage was broadcast, people from Lewisham recognised "Maryam" as Dare.

Abbas was killed in an airstrike in Iraq in December 2014. Dare gave birth to their son. She later traveled to Manbij with both boys; in January 2016 it was reported she had been living there for eighteen months, alongside the family of another British woman married to a British fighter. She had joined the Islamic State by then and complained the $150 monthly salary she was given to live on was insufficient. She wrote on Twitter about seeing a man crucified in public and said he had raped an elderly woman. She kept in touch with her parents back home and her mother told her to return to London, but Dare said she was afraid of going to prison.

In the book Soldatessa del Califfato, which is about a Tunisian woman who joined ISIL, the woman she worked alongside Dare in the Al-Khansaa Brigade, ISIL's all-female moral police. She said Dare enjoyed making other women cry and would recite verses from the Quran while torturing female prisoners.

In January 2016, ISIL released a new propaganda video which showed the execution-style killing of five people said to be spies working for the British government. A masked gunman, speculated to be Siddartha Dhar, called UK prime minister David Cameron an "imbecile" and "slave of the White House". He said ISIL would "one day invade your land, where we will rule by the Sharia." The video included a brief clip of a young boy, dressed in fatigues and a black bandana with an ISIL logo, saying, "We will kill the kuffar over there," while pointing at a car in the distance with what appeared to be prisoners inside it. Cameron described the video as "desperate stuff" from ISIL, which he said was "losing territory".

After the video was posted online, Dare's father in England identified the child, dubbed 'Jihadi Junior' in the press, as his four-year-old grandson, Dare’s older son. Dare’s father appealed to Dare to come home with his grandchildren and "face the music." and said, "They are pure evil for doing this to that child — pure evil." He said he'd spoken to his grandson on the phone and the boy had asked him to come to Syria and get him. Boris Johnson also commented on the video, saying the boy "can't possibly know or understand what he's saying or what he is being made to say. This is child abuse, there is no question at all,” and that Britain had a “duty of care” towards Dare’s son as he was a British national.

In February 2016, a month after the first video was released, Dare’s four-year-old son appeared in a second propaganda video with an unidentified ISIL fighter and three men, who identified themselves as Syrians who had spied for British intelligence. The video showed Dare’s son pressing the detonator and blowing up a car, apparently the same car as in the previous video, with the three men inside it. At the end, the boy shouted, "Allahu Akbar!"

In June 2016, The Sun and the Daily Mirror reported anonymous claims that Dare had smuggled her older son into Sweden because he needed an operation.

ISIL lost the last of its territory in 2019 at the Battle of Baghuz-Farqwani, and the surviving women and children were sent to detention camps such as Al-Hawl and Al-Roj. As of 2022, Dare's fate and whereabouts, and that of her two sons, is unknown or unrecorded.

== See also ==
- Brides of the Islamic State
- Cubs of the Caliphate
- Sally-Anne Jones
- Amira Karroum
- Aqsa Mahmood
- Islam Mitat
- Samantha Sally
