= Bethnal Green trio =

British girls who joined ISIS in 2015

Kadiza Sultana
- Died: Raqqa, Syria
- Cause of death: Airstrike
- Citizenship: United Kingdom
- Education: Mulberry Academy Shoreditch
- Occupation: High school student
- Known for: Islamic State of Iraq and the Levant member
- Spouse: two (deceased)

The Bethnal Green trio are Amira Abase, Shamima Begum, and Kadiza Sultana, three British girls who attended the Bethnal Green Academy in London before leaving home in February 2015 to join ISIS. According to the Institute for Strategic Dialogue, they were among an estimated 550 women and girls from Western countries who had travelled to join ISIS.

As of 2024, Kadiza Sultana has been reported killed, Shamima Begum has been stripped of her British citizenship and denied re-entry into the United Kingdom, and Amira Abase was reported to be deceased according to Begum in the documentary The Return: Life After ISIS (2021).

Amira Abase
- Born: Addis Ababa, Ethiopia
- Died: Al-Baghuz Fawqani, Syria
- Citizenship: United Kingdom
- Education: Mulberry Academy Shoreditch
- Occupation: High school student
- Known for: Islamic State of Iraq and the Levant member
- Spouse: Abdullah Elmir (2015-2016)

== Background ==
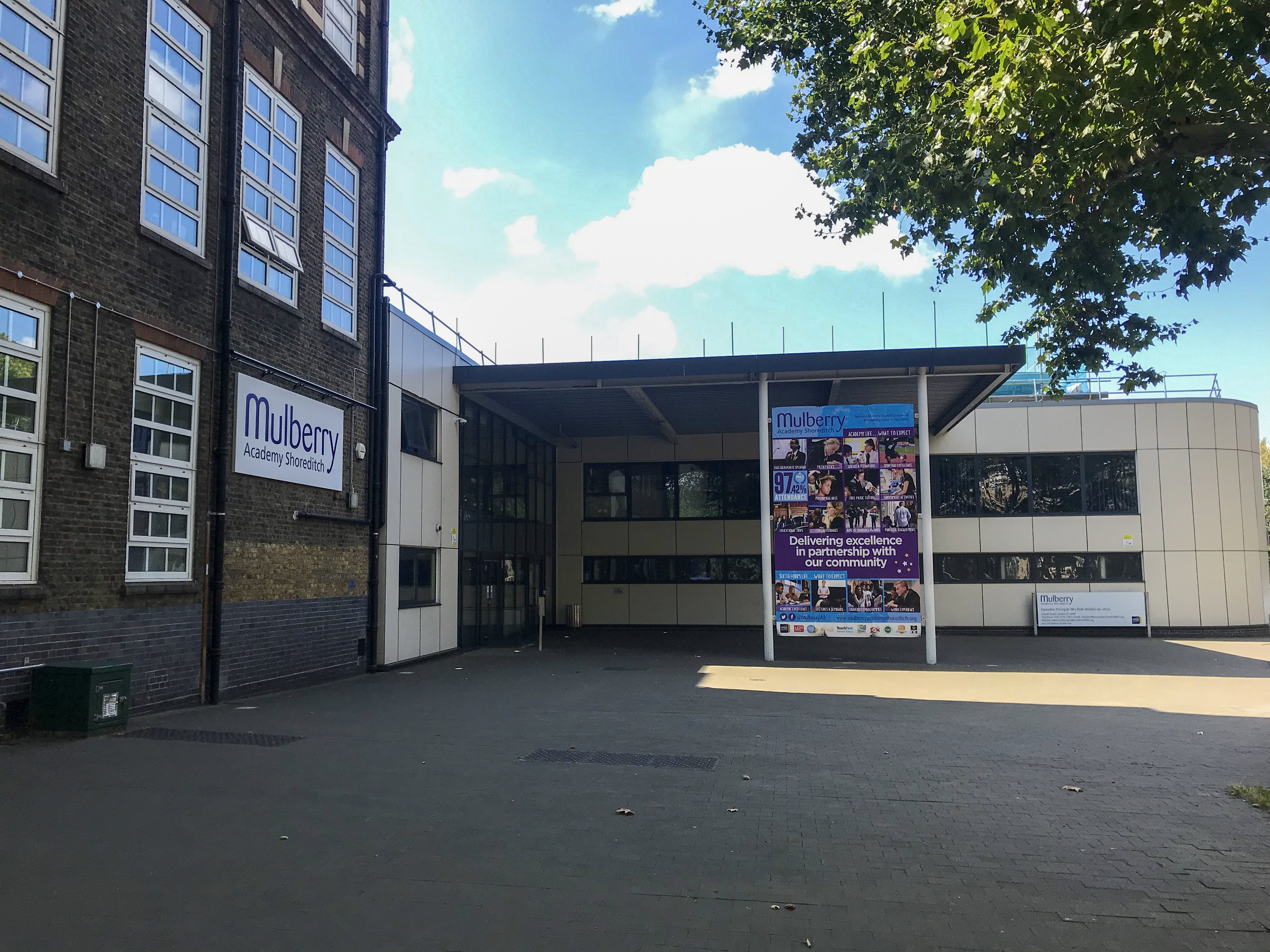
Main entrance of Mulberry Academy Shoreditch, formerly known as Bethnal Green Academy

On 17 February 2015, Abase, Begum, and Sultana flew via Turkish Airlines from Gatwick Airport in West Sussex, England, to Istanbul, Turkey. Their families went to Turkey in March to investigate their disappearance, deeming the police investigation inadequate.

Their disappearance has been attributed to Aqsa Mahmood, a woman from Glasgow who joined ISIL in 2013. There were electronic communications between the girls and Mahmood. Mahmood faces criminal charges if she returns. Mahmood denied the allegations and, as of February 2019, she is believed to have died in the war zone.

Shortly after her departure, Shamima Begum's sister expressed hope that she and her school friends had travelled to IS territory only to bring back their friend Sharmeena Begum (no relation), who had travelled there in 2014. Sharmeena’s father had warned the school and the police to watch his daughter’s friends after she ran away to Syria. Shamima Begum later said Sharmeena had convinced her to come to Syria and depicted IS territory as a paradise.

In March 2015, footage was circulated of Abase Hussen, father of Amira Abase, at a 2012 rally led by Islamist preacher Anjem Choudary against the film Innocence of Muslims. The Metropolitan Police examined the footage but said that it was unlikely that offences had been committed. Hussen said in April that he felt ashamed of his involvement in the rally, as he did not know who had organised it.

Shamima Begum adopted the nom de guerre Umm Ahmed under ISIL. She married Dutch Islamic convert and IS jihadi fighter Yago Riedijk just days after arriving in Raqqa. They had three children who died from malnutrition and disease. Kadiza Sultana was married twice and died in an airstrike with her second husband. Abase is believed to have been killed also.

At a 2015 Home Affairs Select Committee, then Metropolitan Police Commissioner Bernard Hogan-Howe stated that they would not face criminal charges if they returned to the United Kingdom.

== Aftermath ==
In the UK, the disappearance resulted in the Metropolitan Police giving evidence to the Home Affairs Select Committee of the House of Commons on its circumstances in March 2015. The families of the girls received an apology from Scotland Yard, who did not tell them about Sharmeena Begum, the other girl from their school who went to Syria in 2014. The police had written letters to the girls’ parents asking for permission to interview the girls about Sharmeena’s disappearance, but instead of giving them to the parents they gave the letters to the girls themselves, who didn’t pass them on.

British Prime Minister David Cameron said that individual institutions should not be made into "scapegoats" for the disappearance of the three girls. Contrary to the stance of the Metropolitan Police, Cameron said, "Whoever has gone out to join a terrorist organisation is breaking the law and has to face the consequences of breaking the law and we have to let the law take its course in the proper way".

In March 2015, a travel ban was imposed upon five girls from the Bethnal Green Academy due to concerns from social services that the girls attend the same school as the three who had already joined the group, stating that it was in the public interest.

It was reported that the Bethnal Green Trio were married to foreign jihadists, and that they then moved into the homes of their new husbands in ISIL's de facto capital of Raqqa. All three girls adopted nommes de guerre in ISIL territory, as was customary: Begum was Umm Ahmed, Sultana was Umm Musa, and Abase was Umm Zubayr.

Sultana was said to have married an American ISIL fighter with Somali heritage, but wanted to return to the UK after he was killed in battle. The lawyer who represents the family of the teenagers, Tasnime Akunjee, told ITV that Sultana became too scared of making an escape attempt after another girl, Austrian national Samra Kesinovic, was beaten to death for trying to escape. She married a second time after her first husband was killed, to a blind foreign fighter named Taymullah al-Somali, and died with her second husband in a Russian airstrike at the age of 17. Her family said in a phone interview with ITV in August 2016 she died in an airstrike in May. In the podcast I’m Not a Monster, Shamima Begum later stated she and her friend and schoolmate Sharmeena Begum formally identified Sultana’s body and that it was “in pieces.”

Abase married an 18-year-old Australian jihadist, Abdullah Elmir, who in July 2016 was reported by Australian intelligence agencies to have been killed in coalition airstrikes. Abase is also believed to be dead. Her nom de guerre was found online, on a document posted to Instagram by Sharmeena Begum titled "In loving memory of the shahada", a collection of English-language obituaries of ISIL members, along with those of Sultana and her husband. Per the document, during ISIL's last stand at Al-Baghuz Fawqani, Abase was killed by artillery fire while in a trench with two other ISIL women and their children after they refused to surrender.

Shamima Begum married a Dutch jihadist recruit, Yago Riedijk. They had three children, all now dead.

In February 2019, The Times journalist Anthony Loyd found Begum in a Syrian refugee camp. During the interview, Begum said the last time she saw her husband was when they fled the village of Baghuz, Isis' final stronghold, at the beginning of February that year. He was later reported to have surrendered to fighters allied with the Syrian Democratic Forces. She also revealed that she was pregnant and hoped to return to the UK to raise her child but did not regret her decision to join ISIL. In the debate that followed, the UK Home Office announced it would revoke her UK citizenship, while Bangladesh did not recognize her as a citizen.

As of 11 November 2022, Shamima Begum was being held in a detention camp in the northeastern part of Syria near her imprisoned husband. Begum’s lawyer stated Begum was a victim of sex trafficking lured by Islamic State propaganda. Sir James Eadie KC of the Home Office stated Begum is a threat to national security with an MI5 agent reporting it was inconceivable that Begum did not know ISIL was a terrorist organization due to the number of terror attacks and public beheadings being posted in the news at the time they left Britain.

The three girls’ friend Sharmeena Begum, who had travelled to the Islamic State before they had, was tracked down by the BBC in 2023. She was living in hiding, fundraising online for IS. In September 2026, she was arrested in northern Syria after investigators said they had linked her to the perpetrator of the Berlin Pride Attack.

== In other media ==
The events were adapted into the Swedish TV series Caliphate.

The trio's journey to Syria inspired the 2025 film Brides, with the fictionalised story including the bus station in Turkey where they waited.

== See also ==
- Begum v Home Secretary
- United Kingdom and ISIL
- Brides of ISIL
- Aqsa Mahmood
- Sahra Ali Mehenni
- Nora el-Bahty
- Ugbad and Rahma Sadiq
