= Aqsa Mahmood =

Scottish woman who joined ISIL (1993–2019)

- Born: 11 May 1994; Glasgow, Scotland
- Died: February 2019 (aged 24–25); Syria
- Other name: Umm Layth
- Occupation: Student
- Known for: Named on the UN sanctions list for activities relating to ISIL and Al-Qaida
- Father: Muzaffar Mahmood

Aqsa Mahmood (11 May 1994 – February 2019) was a citizen of the United Kingdom, from Glasgow, who stirred controversy in 2013 when she was one of the first British women to voluntarily travel into ISIL territory in Syria, when she was 20 years old. The Militant Leadership Monitor named her as one of its "most dangerous women in jihad." She was reportedly killed in February 2019 and has not been referenced or seen since.

== Early life and radicalisation ==
Mahmood was born in Pollokshields, Glasgow on 11 May 1994 to Pakistani immigrant parents; her father Muzaffar was the first Pakistani to play cricket for the Scottish cricket team. She has brothers and sisters and is from a moderate Muslim family. She attended Craigholme School for five terms before attending Shawlands Academy in Glasgow for a year. She worshipped at the Glasgow Central Mosque and was briefly a student at the al-Meezan Islamic Centre, which taught Quranic recitation for girls and women. At the time she left the UK for Syria, she was taking a course in diagnostic radiography at Glasgow Caledonian University. She was active on social media, with accounts on Twitter and ask.fm, WhatsApp and Kik.

Mahmood's parents came to believe she was convinced to join ISIL by Adeel Ulhaq. The journalist James Fergusson stated she was "groomed for jihad... online, over many years" by Ulhaq, who lived in Nottinghamshire, England. Her parents found out Mahmood was communicating with Ulhaq in May 2013, and her father spoke to Ulhaq on the phone and told him to leave her alone. That summer, Mahmood went to meet Ulhaq's family and told her parents she wanted to marry Ulhaq, but her parents convinced her to postpone the decision to marry and to return home.

Her mother stated Mahmood had begun dressing more religiously before she left, and had wanted to wear the niqab. She had also become increasingly interested in politics and became emotional when she watched news reports about the Syrian civil war.

In November 2013, Mahmood didn't come home one night. Two days earlier, she had persuaded friends to put a rucksack into a bus station locker for her, without telling them why or what was in it; the rucksack contained her plane ticket to Syria and other things she needed. Her mother later stated she called Ulhaq's mother and asked where her daughter was, and was told Mahmood no longer wanted to stay with her family. Her mother then contacted one of Mahmood's university friends and was told Mahmood had gone to Syria. Azadeh Moaveni said she "was a classic example of cult-grooming because she lived so entirely in this interior life."

== ISIL ==
Mahmood travelled to Aleppo, Syria via Turkey to join ISIL. She called her family when she arrived, four days after her departure. She told her parents she did not intend to return home and that she would see them “on the day of judgement," in heaven. A month after she left Scotland, she reportedly married an ISIL fighter. He was later killed in battle. She is known to have lived with her husband in an apartment in Raqqa, in an area known as "Little Britain" because so many British foreign fighters and their families lived there. She arranged one sixteen-year-old British girl’s marriage, to a man in Manbij. Mahmood is also believed to have held a senior role in the Al-Khansaa Brigade, ISIL's all-female morals police.

Mahmood kept in touch with her family over social media after arriving in Syria. She had a Tumblr blog called "Diary of a Mujahirah". (The same title was used for the co-existing Tumblr blog of an ISIL doctor who called herself Bird of Jannah.) Tumblr removed the blog in October 2015, two years after it was first published. Mahmood used a Twitter account under the name Umm Layth, and urged Muslims to join ISIL or to commit terrorist acts, tweeting, "If you cannot make it to the battlefield then bring the battlefield to yourself." Her blog mentioned Mauritian ISIL blogger Zafirr Golamaully, and he mentioned her on his blog. Her disappearance from Scotland and her online writings are discussed in Under the Black Flag: An Exclusive Insight into the Inner Workings of ISIS by Sami Moubayed, in Jihad and the West: Black Flag Over Babylon by Mark Silinsky, and in Kevin Baker's Radicalization among other books.

Mahmood published a guide on how to reach Syria, giving advice on what things people should take with them and how to avoid detection. She described her decision to leave Scotland and her family for the Islamic State as the greatest sacrifice she had ever made. Mahmood stated it was permissible for Muslim women to travel without a guardian if they were migrating to the Islamic State, and that temporary guardians would be appointed for women who wanted to marry an ISIL fighter but didn't have permission from their guardian. She warned women that they would not be able to participate in combat under ISIL and would be expected to be housewives to jihadists, and that if they travelled to ISIL territory they would have to prepare for widowhood as their fighter husbands were likely to be killed. On Twitter she said, "The reward you will receive after your 'migration' is very high. You will finally become the wife of a martyr, and you will be overcome by feelings that words cannot describe."

Mahmood's parents made a public appeal for her to return home in September, ten months after she left. In 2015, Mahmood's family challenged the allegation that she played a role in recruiting three teenage girls, the Bethnal Green trio, to follow her example. Mahmood's family stated she had told them she wasn't in touch with the girls and did not recognize their names. She may have had contact with Tooba Gondal prior to the latter's departure from Britain for Syria.

In April 2015, Mark Rowley, the Assistant Commissioner for Specialist Operations of the Metropolitan Police Service and the concurrent Chair of the National Police Chiefs' Council Counter-Terrorism Coordination Committee, told the UK House of Commons Home Affairs Committee that security officials were close to compiling enough evidence to charge Mahmood, if she returned to the UK, or to request extradition, if she tried to settle elsewhere. On 28 September 2015 the United Nations placed her on its sanctions list, reserved for those with ties to Al Qaeda. UK authorities rescinded her passport, to prevent her return to the United Kingdom. A statement issued by Mahmood's family said she had "no global assets to freeze" and accused the British government of abandoning her.

Adeel Ulhaq was never charged in connection with Mahmood's case. But in 2016, he and two other British men were convicted of preparation of terrorist acts and Ulhaq was also convicted of funding terrorism, for helping a 17-year-old boy, Aseel Muthana, join ISIL. Muthana arrived in Syria in March 2014, joining his older brother who had gone there three months before him. During his trial, Ulhaq testified that he had considered going to Syria to bring Mahmood, whom he called his ex-girlfriend, home. Since his release from prison in 2018 he has been returned to prison twice for breaching the terms of his release.

In February 2019, The Mirror reported that Mahmood was believed to have died in the war zone.

== See also ==
- Tareena Shakil – Former English terrorist
- Ifthekar Jaman – British-Bangladeshi man who traveled to Syria and joined ISIL
- Sharmeena Begum – British jihadist (born 1999)
- Shamima Begum – British-born woman who joined the IS
- Ugbad and Rahma Sadiq – Somali-born Norwegian sisters who joined ISIL
- Brides of the Islamic State
