= 2026 Berlin Pride attack =

Vehicle-ramming and slashing attack in Germany

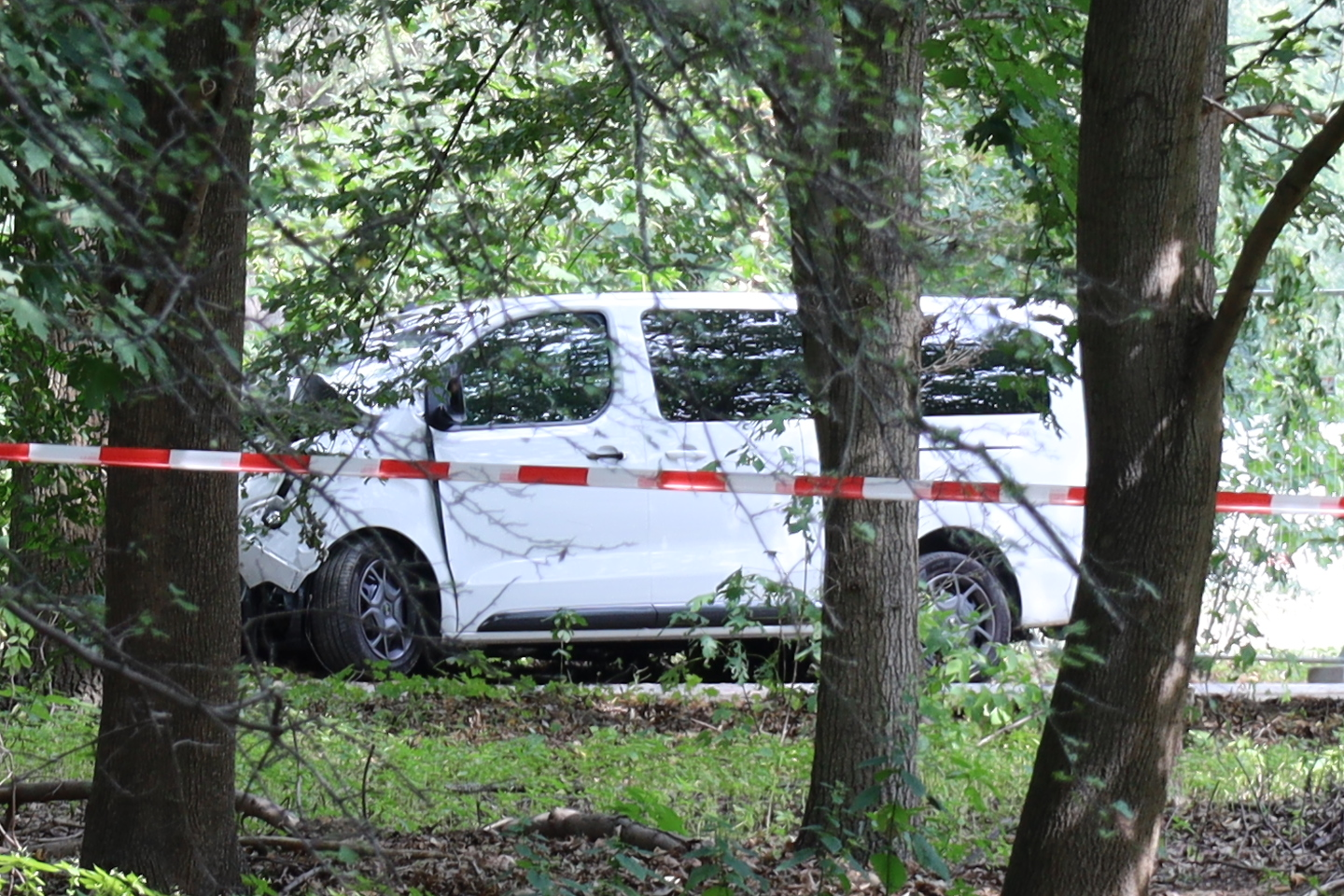
- The van used in the attack after it had crashed into a tree

- 2026 Berlin Pride attack (Berlin) Location within Berlin
- Location: 52°30′45″N 13°22′12″E; Ahornsteig, Tiergarten, Berlin, Germany
- Date: 25 July 2026 c. 22:00 (CEST; UTC+02:00)
- Target: Pedestrians attending Berlin Pride celebrations
- Attack type: Vehicle-ramming attack, slashing
- Weapons: Citroën SpaceTourer, machete
- Deaths: 1
- Injuries: 29
- Perpetrator: Abdul Ballout
- Motive: Islamic terrorism

On the evening of 25 July 2026, 21-year-old Lebanese-German Abdul Ballout drove a van into a crowd of pedestrians during Berlin Christopher Street Day, a pride celebration in the Tiergarten in central Berlin, Germany. One woman was killed and 29 people were injured, several critically. Ballout fled on foot, and a large-scale manhunt was launched. He was fatally shot the next day by police when they attempted to arrest him.

The pride event, which had drawn hundreds of thousands of attendees, was called off shortly after the attack. Interior Minister Alexander Dobrindt said that it was suspected to be an Islamist terrorist attack.

A year before the attack, in May 2025, Ballout was arrested in Lebanon while attempting to enter Syria to join ISIS. He flew back to Germany in November 2025, but was arrested and detained at the Berlin Airport. In May 2026, two months before the attack, Ballout was convicted of planning an attack but instead received a suspended sentence from a juvenile court.

== Background ==
Berlin Pride, known locally as Christopher Street Day, after the New York street where Stonewall Inn is situated, is Berlin's annual pride celebration, commemorating the 1969 Stonewall riots. It is a combination of parades and demonstrations for LGBTQ+ equality and protection against discrimination. The 2026 parade drew hundreds of thousands of participants along its route through central Berlin, culminating in a closing rally and concert near the Brandenburg Gate.

== Attack ==
At approximately 22:00 on 25 July 2026, a Citroën SpaceTourer van struck pedestrians on the Ahornsteig pedestrian path in Tiergarten, off the route the pride march had earlier followed. The van collided with a tree in the park, after which the driver attacked bystanders with a machete and ran away.

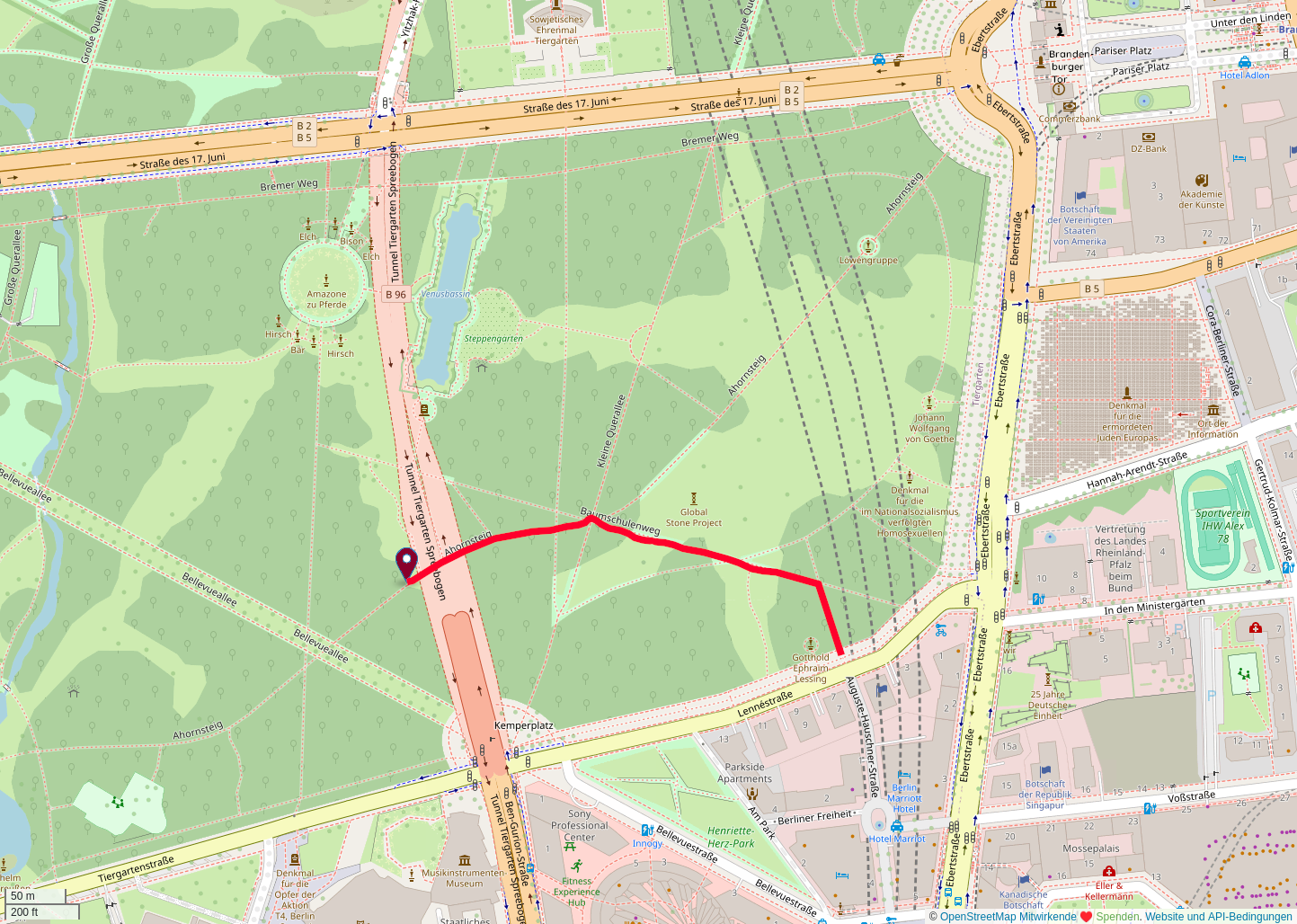
Route of the perpetrator, ramming people walking on the footpaths

The pride event was cancelled at about 22:15, cutting short the closing rally near the Brandenburg Gate. Organisers and police told attendees to leave the area immediately. Berlin's fire department said its psychosocial emergency support teams treated around 30 people at the scene who were not physically injured but required support. Police cordoned off a large section of the Tiergarten and urged people to avoid the surrounding area, and officers at the scene were described as heavily equipped, using ballistic helmets and rapid-fire weapons.

== Victims ==
A 65-year-old woman from Poland died at the scene after initial resuscitation attempts by first responders. Twenty-nine people were injured, some seriously. By the morning after the attack, none of the casualties were in a critical condition. Police established a dedicated telephone line for relatives seeking information.

== Investigation ==
On the morning of 26 July, police said an intensive manhunt for one or more perpetrators was under way. Der Tagesspiegel reported that videos of arrests circulating on social media around this time showed unrelated detentions elsewhere at the edges of the pride crowd, not of the perpetrator. Later on the same day, Berlin police named 21-year-old Abdul Ballout as the suspect, after which the Berlin public prosecutor's office released further details about him. Police described Ballout as a member of Berlin's “Islamist scene”. and launched a public manhunt. An Iranian man, initially believed to be a passenger in the van, was arrested the same night but later released without any charges. Interior Minister Alexander Dobrindt described the incident as "an Islamic terrorist attack".

Berlin police and the General Public Prosecutor's Office issued a wanted notice that described Ballout as around 1.9 metres tall and of slim build, with black hair, and warned that he could be armed and dangerous. Ballout was born in Berlin in 2005 to a Lebanese family. Police said he had known links to Islamist circles, and Dobrindt stated that Ballout "had previously drawn attention to himself through a high volume of criminal offences, radicalisation and affiliation with the Islamist scene".

According to details released by the Berlin public prosecutor's office, a juvenile court convicted him in February 2022 of assault and robbery for assaulting a victim at a Berlin high school in 2019 and robbing another victim of a pair of headphones in 2020.

The Berlin public prosecutor's office said Ballout travelled via Turkey to Lebanon in May 2025, more than a year before the attack, intending to join the Islamic State (ISIS) in Syria. He was arrested in July 2025 and sentenced to three months in prison by a Lebanese military court for 'incitement to religious and sectarian conflict'. Ballout then returned to Germany in November 2025 after completing his sentence, where he was arrested at Berlin Brandenburg Airport and held in pre-trial detention. In May 2026, two months before the attack, Ballout was convicted by a juvenile court of “preparing a serious act of violence endangering the state” and sentenced to 22 months in prison. The court deferred its decision on whether to suspend the sentence for six months, and he was released under probation supervision.

On 3 July, police searched Ballout's home on suspicion of weapons possession but found only a toy gun. He had recently been transferred to a deradicalisation programme whose staff judged his cooperation "fake" and planned to alert authorities. That a suspect with this record was released and not under close surveillance became a controversy of the aftermath, drawing criticism from politicians, security experts, and a police union. After the attack, the German government began to consider banning convicted terrorists from getting suspended sentences.

On the evening of 26 July, Ballout was shot and killed by the SEK, a state-controlled German police tactical unit, during an attempted arrest in Spandau. On 28 July 2026 it was reported Ballout recorded a video, and in September 2026 it was reported he sent it to an Islamic State contact. That contact was identified as British national Sharmeena Begum and arrested that same month in northern Syria.

== Responses ==
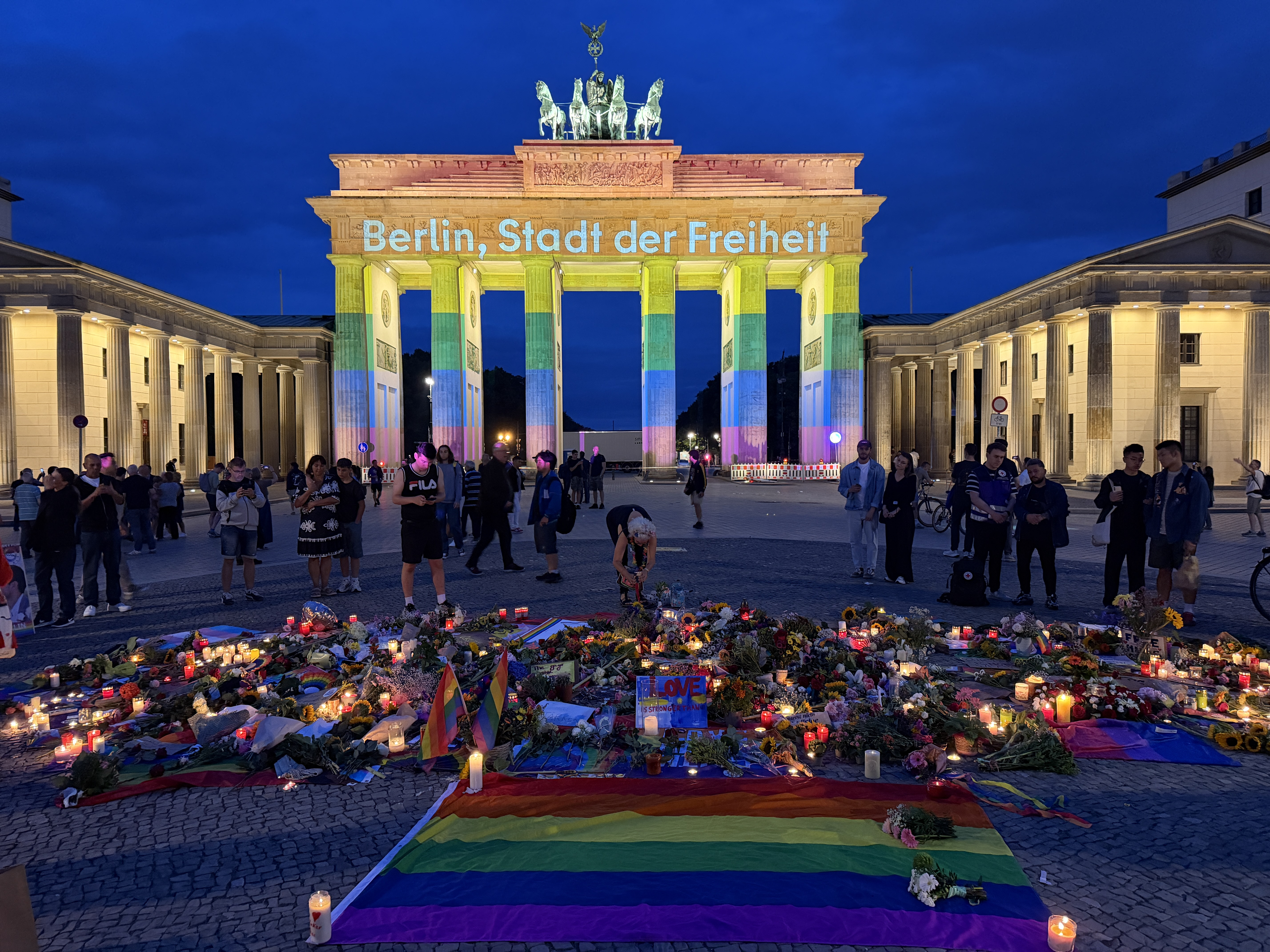
Flowers and candles at Pariser Platz in front of the Brandenburg Gate one day after the attack. The Brandenburg Gate is illuminated in Pride colors.

Governing Mayor Kai Wegner visited the scene and condemned the attack as a strike against Berlin's open society, posting that the city's freedom had been targeted. Chancellor Friedrich Merz condemned the attack as an "abhorrent act". A government spokesperson said that Merz was in close contact with Federal Interior Minister Alexander Dobrindt and was receiving continual briefings from security authorities. Merz and Dobrindt thanked emergency personnel and pledged to press for a thorough investigation and punishment of those responsible. Berlin's state interior senator, Iris Spranger, said she was shocked by the attack on a peacefully celebrating crowd and that she was in close contact with security authorities. The Berlin Senate's queer-affairs commissioner, Alfonso Pantisano, described the attack as a day of "great mourning for the queer community".

On 26 July, it was reported that German officials had called for tighter laws against known extremists. The Alternative for Germany party accused Friedrich Merz of failing to deal with Islamic radicalism in Germany. Meanwhile, Die Linke proposed a plan for the protection of queer life in Berlin which includes preventive measures against queerphobia, education about LGBT+ rights at schools, the reversal of budget cuts for queer projects, and adding protections against discrimination on the basis of sexual identity to the Basic Law. At the same time, House of Representatives deputy Elif Eralp opposed "instrumentalization of the attack for anti-Muslim racism" and immediate tightening of security laws.

Also on 26 July, a remembrance rally was held at Pariser Platz. The event had been registered with police for 600 participants, but the organiser estimated that up to 10,000 attended; police put the figure at 5,000. A silent memorial march from St. Mary's Church to the Brandenburg Gate was planned for later that afternoon.

On 26 July 2026, the day after the attack, Forum Islam Berlin—a forum comprising Muslim religious communities and organisations in Berlin—strongly condemned the attack and expressed solidarity with the victims, injured people, and their families. Imam Scharjil Khalid also told Neues Deutschland that, on the Forum's initiative, direct contacts had been established with Berliner CSD e. V., the association that organises Berlin Pride, since the attack. In response to the attack, members of the Ahmadiyya-run Khadija Mosque organised a series of public dialogue and protest actions under the slogan "Muslin for Peace—Together Against Extremism." The imam also criticised what he described as a climate of generalised suspicion toward Muslims.

Julia Miosga, a board member of Berliner CSD e.V., said that right-wing or religious ideologies sought to oppress queer people and opposed attempts to exploit the attack to incite hatred against Muslims or people of particular origins. The Berlin-Brandenburg regional association of LSVD+ called for improved legal protections for LGBT+ people. Doreen Hoffmann, a board member of CSD Deutschland, a federation of Pride organizing associations in Germany, expressed anger towards political and religious extremists, as well as towards politicians who, in her view, expressed concern after the attack despite repeatedly challenging queer rights. LSVD+ accused "right-wing populist and radical right parties and media" of racism and hypocrisy concerning LGBT+ rights. On 2 August 2026, thousands of people marched through the Mitte borough of central Berlin in a protest against anti-queer hatred and Islamophobia, in response to an increase in Islamophobic rhetoric following the attack.
