= Ifthekar Jaman =

British man who traveled to Syria and joined ISIL

- Born: 1990; Portsmouth, England, UK
- Died: 15 December 2013 (aged 22–23)
- Other name: Abu Abdur Rahman al-Britani
- Known for: Islamic State of Iraq and the Levant member

Ifthekar Jaman was a British man who was one of the first British fighters to travel to Syria and join the Islamic State of Iraq and the Levant in 2013. He was notable for his ISIL propaganda posts on social media and for recruiting other men he knew from his hometown into ISIL, before he was killed in December 2013 at age 23. He was the focus of a book, Alex Perry's Once Upon a Jihad. Since his death almost all of his recruits have been killed and his brothers have been jailed for terrorism offenses.

== Early life ==
Jaman was born in Portsmouth, England of first-generation Bangladeshi immigrant parents who ran a restaurant and had lived in the UK since 1981. He has a sister and two brothers. When he was about eleven or twelve years old, his parents sent him to a madrassa in London for a year.

In his late teens, Jaman was part of the "Portsmouth Dawah Team" who proselytized Islam on the streets of Portsmouth. Prior to traveling to Syria, he posted a tweet in support for Anwar Al-Alwaki, and also said, "I love Osama Bin Laden, I think he looks kinda cool." He was popular with his non-Muslim colleagues at work.

== ISIL ==
In May 2013, Jaman quit his job at a call center and left the UK alone. He said he was going to the Middle East to study Arabic and possibly help with refugees from the Syrian civil war. He flew to Turkey and took a bus to the town of Reyhanlı on the Syrian border.

His family back in England stated he had become concerned about the plight of Syrian civilians and they believed he had gone there to help. One of his brothers told the BBC Jaman posed no threat to the UK, as he had no intention of ever returning there.

Jaman told Shiraz Maher, in an interview in November 2013, that at first he thought the Syrian civil war was "Muslim versus Muslim, it's not jihad." Later, however, he became convinced that the war was a battle over the future of Islam. He told Maher that on while on a bus in Turkey he met a strange man and approached him because he guessed that the man was a jihadist. The man was in fact a jihadist, and he crossed the Syrian border at Bab al-Hawa with Jaman and took him to his home in Aleppo. Jaman initially hoped to join Al-Nusra Front but was rejected because he had no one who could vouch for him. At a coffee shop he met an Algerian member of ISIL, which Jaman said he had previously never heard of, and he ultimately joined ISIL.

Jaman posted photos and videos of his life in Syria on Facebook, Twitter and Instagram, calling it "five star jihad" and encouraging Muslims to come to Syria. He used the nom de guerre Abu Abdur Rahman al-Britani and, after his training period ended, was initially assigned to guard duty.

He had 3,000 Twitter followers and answered questions on Ask.fm, telling one user it was not necessary to learn Arabic before traveling to Syria. He justified his decision to fight in Syria saying, "A man leaves his home to fight for the oppressed people... sounds heroic until you add in 'Muslim man'. Then he's a terrorist / extremist." In an interview with the BBC he said it was his "duty" to join the fight because Muslims were "being slaughtered." In November 2013, he gave an interview with Newsnight and said, "We are trying to establish the law of God, the law of Allah." He said Britain should not worry about fighters like himself returning home.

He is known to have convinced a group of five Bangladeshi-British men he knew from Portsmouth to come to Syria to join ISIL in October 2013.

== Death and legacy ==
On 15 December 2013, in what the Jamestown Foundation's Militant Leadership Monitor said was "apparently his first actual involvement in combat," Jaman was killed by a tank near the city of Deir ez-Zor, months after arriving in Syria.

After Jaman's death, his brother Mustakim told Channel 4, "He died protecting the people. He fought for his God and the people itself... His martyrdom is such a noble way someone can go out." Of the five men from Portsmouth he was able to recruit, only one survived. The story of Jaman and the Portsmouth men he recruited is told in Alex Perry's book Once Upon a Jihad: Life and Death with the Young and Radicalised.

In October 2015, Jaman's brothers, Mustakim Jaman and Tuhin Shahensha, were both convicted of preparing terrorist acts for providing assistance for his Portsmouth recruits in traveling to Syria, including using their bank accounts to transfer money. Jurors at their first trial, in May, had been unable to reach a verdict. Tuhin was also convicted of preparing to travel to Syria himself. A counterterrorism police officer said the brothers had not had plans to attack the UK. They were sentenced to six years each in prison. Both of Jaman's brothers subsequently changed their names. Both men have been jailed since their name changes for failure to comply with the terms of a Part 4 Terrorist Notification Order under Section 54 of the Counter-Terrorism Act 2008.

== See also ==
- Shamima Begum – British-born woman who joined the IS
- Aqsa Mahmood – Scottish woman who joined ISIL (1993–2019)
- Sharmeena Begum – British jihadist (born 1999)
- Tareena Shakil – Former English terrorist
- Zafirr Golamaully, Mauritian man who joined ISIL in 2014
- Muhammad Zahab, Australian man who joined ISIL and brought in a dozen Australians
