= Sharmeena Begum =

British jihadist (born 1999)

- Born: 1999 (age 26–27); Bethnal Green, London, England
- Education: Bethnal Green Academy, London
- Parents: Mohammad Uddin (father); Shahnaz Begum (mother)

Sharmeena Begum (born 1999) is a British Bangladeshi woman who left the United Kingdom to join the Islamic State of Iraq and the Levant (ISIL) in Syria in December 2014 and became an ISIL bride. Two months later, in February 2015, her school friends Amira Abase, Shamima Begum, and Kadiza Sultana (who collectively became known as the Bethnal Green trio) joined her in Syria. Begum is one of the youngest British teenagers to join ISIL.

Begum was tracked down online by the BBC in 2023, and at the time she was fundraising for ISIS and said she was living in hiding. In September 2026, she was arrested in northern Syria after investigators said they had linked her to the perpetrator of the 2026 Berlin Pride Attack.

== Background ==
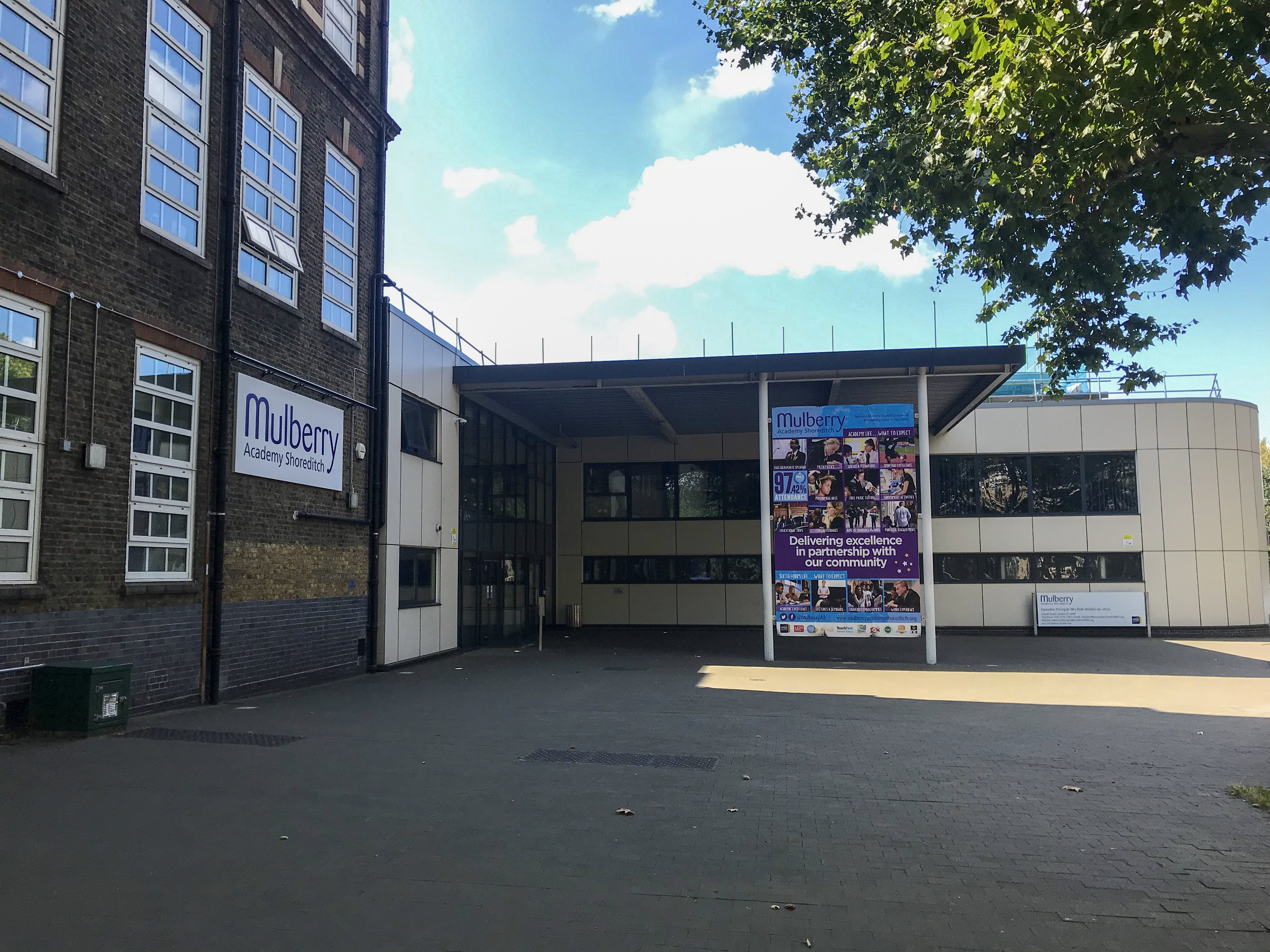
Main entrance of Mulberry Academy Shoreditch, formerly known as Bethnal Green Academy

Begum was born in London to Shahnaz Begum and Mohammad Uddin, who are of Bangladeshi origin. She was raised by her mother until her father joined them in the UK in 2007. Begum's mother died of cancer in January 2014. Her father remarried in September 2014, and Begum left for Syria in December of that year. Begum's father said that her behaviour had changed; she stopped listening to Western music and began going to her room to pray, but he assumed that she was grieving about her mother's death. At the time of her father's remarriage, she lived with her grandmother.

Members of Begum's family were certain that she was targeted for recruitment by a group known as the Sisters Forum within the Islamic Forum of Europe, which met at an east London mosque. Women from the group that recruited her have been described as "brainwashing" her, telling her that she would meet her recently deceased mother in paradise if she died a martyr, and reportedly brought her to the airport for her departure.

Sharmeena Begum was friends with Amira Abase, Shamima Begum (unrelated), and Kadiza Sultana, who left for Syria a few months later. All four attended Bethnal Green Academy.

== Joining ISIL ==
Begum became increasingly interested in religious themes after her mother died, although her family had previously described her as non-religious. She is said to have begun praying, and stopped listening to Western music. Begum did not get along with her new stepmother, and had gone to live with one of her grandmothers.

According to police, she was encouraged by two unidentified women to join ISIL. They brought Begum to Gatwick Airport for a flight to Turkey, from where she made her way to Syria. According to reports by her family, she purchased the plane ticket with £500 that she persuaded her grandmother to give her. Begum used her grandmother's passport for her travels, telling her that she needed to borrow the passport for her schoolwork.

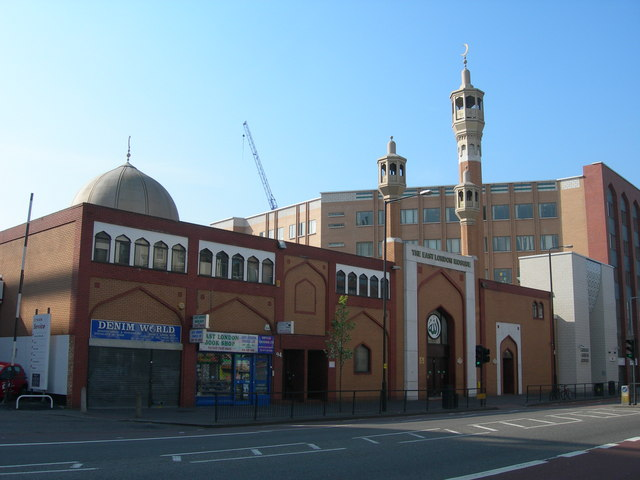
The East London Mosque, where Begum reportedly met the Sisters Forum

The women who encouraged her are thought to be members of a group known as the Sisters Forum, part of the Islamic Forum of Europe. The East London Mosque denied any involvement in Begum's radicalisation. Two weeks after her departure, she reportedly called her father to tell him that she did not intend to return.

After his daughter's disappearance, Uddin told police about his suspicion that Begum might have been encouraged by Islamists and her three friends might also be at risk. The Metropolitan Police subsequently approached the three girls to question them about their friend. Since they were minors, they gave them letters to give to their parents to give permission for the questioning. The letters were not passed along, and the police did not follow up.

Begum was joined two months after her departure by her three friends from Bethnal Green Academy, who had also made their way to Syria via Turkey. They reportedly met in Raqqa.

Begum reportedly married a Bosnian fighter who was later killed. Shamima Begum reported last seeing her in Baghuz in June 2018. Jasmine Jawhar, author of Terrorists' use of the internet: The case of DAESH, said that Begum and her school friends were "mesmerised by the 'romantic idea of jihad'".

== Criticism of police response ==
Begum's travel to Islamic State-occupied Syria, followed by the travel of three of her friends, triggered a discussion of whether UK security officials could have prevented the other girls from following her example. Parents of fellow students said that they were unaware that Begum had travelled to Islamic State territory.

Begum's father criticised the police for ignoring his concerns that her friends might follow her example. On 19 February 2019, Metropolitan Police Commissioner Cressida Dick defended the police against claims that they should have been able to anticipate Begum's friends following her example. Dick denied that Begum was travelling on the same plane as another teenage recruit who was prevented from travelling. Acknowledging that another 15-year-old girl was prevented from travelling the night Begum left, she said she thought the other girl was on a different plane. As for criticism that the police could have prevented her friends from following her example, Dick said that police did speak with her friends but saw them as witnesses rather than potential victims at the time; "knowing somebody's intentions is 'extremely complicated'".

== Online contact with the BBC (2023) ==
In February 2019, Begum was described as missing. In 2023, she was contacted online by the BBC after she had escaped from the Al-Hawl refugee camp. According to the BBC's report, Begum was living and hiding in Syria, raising money for the ISIL through social media.

== Links to terror attack and arrest in Syria (2026) ==
In September 2026, Begum was arrested in northern Syria after German authorities investigating the 2026 Berlin Pride attack found messages between her and the attacker, Abdul Ballout, including a reported video in which he pledged allegiance to ISIL. This video was made on the same day as the attack and his death, and Ballout and Begum had been in communication in the days prior, but she had not been counseling him and was unaware of his plans.

Initial reports about Begum’s link to Ballout indicated Begum was dead. Begum’s father said that, until he was informed by the news media of his daughter’s arrest and detention, he had thought she had been killed in Syria. Sharmeena Begum was 27 years old at the time of her arrest. She has been stripped of her British citizenship.

== See also ==
- Shamima Begum
- Talha Asmal
- Brides of ISIL
- British Bangladeshi
- List of British Bangladeshis
- Nora el-Bahty
- Yusra Hussien and Samya Dirie
- List of solved missing person cases (post-2000)
- Sexual jihad
- United Kingdom and ISIL
