= Ugbad and Rahma Sadiq =

Somali-born Norwegian sisters who joined ISIL

Ugbad Sadiq
- Born: December 25, 1993 (age 32); Somaliland
- Other name: Ugbad Sadiq Juma
- Citizenship: Norway
- Known for: Norwegian who traveled to Syria to join ISIL
- Criminal charge: participation in a terrorist organization
- Penalty: 4 years in prison

Rahma Sadiq
- Born: 1997 (age 28–29); Somaliland
- Other name: Rahma Sadiq Juma
- Citizenship: Norway
- Known for: Norwegian who traveled to Syria to join ISIL
- Criminal charge: participation in a terrorist organization
- Penalty: 2 years in prison

Ugbad Sadiq (born December 25, 1993) and Rahma Sadiq (born October 1997), also known as Ugbad and Rahma Sadiq Juma, were some of the earliest Norwegians to voluntarily travel to the Islamic State of Iraq and Levant (ISIL) territory in Syria. The sisters were 19 and 16 years old when they left their homes in Bærum in October 2013. They were the subject of a book by Åsne Seierstad, Two Sisters: A Father, His Daughters, and Their Journey Into the Syrian Jihad. The book refers to them by the fictitious names Leila Juma and Ayan Juma.

In 2023, both sisters were repatriated to Norway with their Syria-born children and, in 2025, they were convicted of terrorism charges. Ugbad was sentenced to four years, and Rahma to two years with one year suspended. Both women appealed the verdict, but subsequently withdrew their appeals.

== Early life ==
Ugbad and Rahma were born in Somaliland. They came from a moderate Muslim family and have three brothers. In 1997, their father travelled to Norway and applied for asylum. He was denied asylum but allowed to remain in Norway, work and apply for permanent residency. The rest of the family followed him to Norway after he got his residence permit. They all became Norwegian citizens.

In the year before they left, the sisters’ parents noticed they had become more religious: they began praying and fasting fervently, had stopped wearing makeup, jewelry and perfume and had started wearing the abaya, hijab and niqab. Ugbad claims she was bullied at school for wearing the hijab. The sisters joined Islam Net, an Islamist organization with a chapter at Oslo University College, and became very involved in it, and they also attended Quran school. Both girls stopped participating in physical education in school, saying their religion did not permit it because they might have physical contact with boys. They asked their parents for permission to return to Somaliland to live with their grandparents, as they felt they could not live the way they wanted to in Norway, but their parents told them they should finish their education first.

== ISIL ==
On October 17, 2013, Ugbad and Rahma packed their school bags, left home in the morning and never returned. They sent their father an email saying they were going to Syria to help suffering Muslims. Rahma texted her brother saying, "We did this 100% for Allah's sake. Not for any boyfriends or anyone else. So fear Allah." Ugbad later said a friend in Islam Net who had travelled to Syria before her, the wife of Bastian Vasquez, had pressured her to go to Syria to join them. She said her friend had told her it was her religious duty go and had romanticized the situation in Syria.

Ugbad and Rahma's father travelled to Syria to try to get them to return to Norway, and he was allowed to meet Ugbad, but she had already married and refused to go home. Their father was subsequently imprisoned by ISIL and tortured as a suspected spy before being released and allowed to leave ISIL territory and return home.

While in Syria, both teenagers married foreign ISIL fighters. Rahma's husband was Imran Nur Hersi, a British citizen who travelled to Syria in August 2013. He was from Willesden Green, West London and in his mid-twenties. They had a daughter. Hersi died in August 2017. Ugbad's husband was Hisham Hussein Ahmed, an Eritrean-Norwegian she had known from back home who had travelled to Syria in December 2012. He had come to Norway at age 13 as an asylum seeker and lived with a foster family in Bærum for five years as a teenager. In March 2017, Norwegian authorities charged him with participation in a terrorist organization. Ugbad later described Ahmed as a controlling and threatening husband. They had two daughters. He died in December 2018.

Both sisters attended Sharia courses offered by ISIL and attempted to recruit other Norwegian women to the group. Rahma spoke of starting a military training camp for ISIL women. Ugbad attended Quran school and language training under ISIL, taught English, and handled “incidents and reactions“ by women said to be ISIL's enemies.

After the fall of ISIL, in March 2019, the sisters surrendered to Kurdish forces and were placed in the Al-Hawl refugee camp. Their husbands were dead. The women's family back in Norway had not heard from them in years by the time of their surrender and thought they might be dead.

Ugbad later admitted she helped smuggle cash and cryptocurrency into Al-Hawl, including money from Arfan Bhatti, who had known her late husband; she said she did it to support her children and to save up money for an eventual planned departure from the camp and escape back to Norway. The sisters were later moved to the Al-Roj refugee camp. Witnesses in the camp told NRK that both women were part of a group of extremists who attacked and beat women who removed their gloves, hijab and face covering.

== Return to Norway ==
In March 2023, Ugbad and Rahma returned to Norway with their three daughters. They were arrested upon arrival.

At their trial, the sisters denied having travelled to Syria with the intent to join ISIL and stated they intended to do aid work with the civilian population there, but found themselves unable to leave Syria once they'd arrived. They denied having ever supported ISIL, argued they had been victims of human trafficking requested a full acquittal.

Both sisters were convicted of terrorism charges. Ugbad was sentenced to four years in prison, and Rahma to two years with one year suspended. When they were sentenced, the judge stressed that they had spoken positively about life in ISIL and had promoted ISIL's way of life even after the fall of the ISIL caliphate, in Al-Hawl. The maximum sentence the women could have each gotten was six years.

In February 2025, both sisters announced they would appeal the verdict. On September 30, Ugbad withdrew her appeal. On October 1, Rahma withdrew her appeal also. Both sisters cited concern for their children as part of the reason they withdrew.

== See also ==
- Shamima Begum – British-born woman who joined the IS
- Aqsa Mahmood – Scottish woman who joined ISIL (1993–2019)
- Sharmeena Begum – British jihadist (born 1999)
- Tareena Shakil – Former English terrorist
- Sahra Ali Mehenni
- Nora el-Bahty
- Sabina Selimovic and Samra Kesinovic
