= Brides of the Islamic State =

Girls and women who joined the IS

Beginning in 2012, dozens of girls and women travelled to Iraq and Syria to join the Islamic State, becoming brides of Islamic State fighters.

== Background ==
Most jihadist organisations engage in a religious-ideological struggle, in which militant violence is viewed as a sacred duty (martyrdom) and the primary strategy for waging jihad. Historically, jihadist organisations have refrained from recruiting women into their ranks for cultural and religious reasons, despite the fact that women often faced fewer obstacles, such as security checks and body searches, when carrying out terrorist attacks due to religious taboos on physical interaction between men and women. Concepts such as mahram—which dictates that a woman's husband or male relatives are the only men she may be alone or unveiled with—and the emphasis on sexual purity traditionally confined women to domestic roles as wives and mothers, as warzones were deemed a threat to these religious and social values.

However, since the early 21st century, this custom has shifted. Women have increasingly been deployed as suicide bombers and have assumed key roles in planning future attacks.

== Women in IS ==
The establishment of the Islamic State (IS) and its institutions resulted in the relatively high incorporation of women into the organisation, due to a demand of people fulfilling non-militant roles within the state-building project of IS. Beginning in 2012, dozens of girls and women travelled to Iraq and Syria to join the Islamic State, becoming brides of Islamic State fighters. While some travelled voluntarily, including three British schoolgirls known as the Bethnal Green trio, others were taken to IS-controlled territories as minors, either by their families or through coercion.

Within IS, women's primary role was that of a wife and mother. As the wife of an IS fighter, a woman was expected to support her husband by performing domestic duties such as cooking, cleaning, and providing sexual comfort, while he engaged in what was perceived as a divine jihad. As mothers, women were responsible for raising the next generation of fighters, which was seen as a religious duty.

Drawing inspiration from Iran and Saudi Arabia, IS implemented a state-building strategy that included gender-segregated parallel institutions. These women-led sections addressed female-related affairs within the so-called Caliphate, limiting intersex interaction while enabling women to contribute to IS's governance structure.

One such women-led initiative focused on IS's propaganda efforts via social media platforms, including Twitter, Facebook, and WhatsApp. Female recruiters leveraged the growing presence of women within IS as a tool to persuade other foreign women to join, while also providing guidance on the risks and logistics of travelling to IS-controlled territories.

Many of these women gained public notoriety either for their role in recruitment, their deaths, or their subsequent renunciation of IS and attempts to return to their home countries. Analysts have noted the difficulty in distinguishing between women who were active participants in IS's atrocities and those who were confined to domestic roles.

== Notable women who were married to Islamic State fighters, aided IS or attempted to do so ==
=== Australia ===
- Hodan Abby
- Mariam Dabboussy
- Zehra Duman
- Tara Nettleton
- Zaynab Sharrouf

=== Austria ===
- Samra Kesinovic
- Sabina Selimovic

=== Canada ===
- Kimberly Gwen Polman

=== Denmark ===
- Salma Halane
- Zahra Halane

=== France ===
- Sahra Ali Mehenni
- Hayat Boumeddiene
- Tooba Gondal
- Amandine Le Coz
- Emilie Konig

=== Germany ===
- Linda Wenzel

=== Ireland ===
- Lisa Smith

=== Malaysia ===
- Bird of Jannah

=== Morocco ===
- Fatiha Mejjati
- Islam Mitat

=== New Zealand ===
- Suhayra Aden

=== Norway ===
- Rahma Sadiq
- Ugbad Sadiq

=== Russia ===
- Seda Dudurkaeva

=== Spain ===
- Luna Fernández Grande
- Yolanda Martínez Cobos
- Lubna Miludi
- Tomasa Pérez Molleja

=== Sweden ===
- Lina Ishaq

=== Syria ===
- Ahlam al-Nasr
- Iman al-Bugha

=== Trinidad and Tobago ===
- Gailon Su

=== United Kingdom ===
- Amira Abase
- Roshanara Begum
- Shamima Begum
- Sharmeena Begum
- Khadijah Dare
- Samya Dirie
- Yusra Hussien
- Sally Jones
- Sheida Khanam
- Rajia Khanom
- Aqsa Mahmood
- Tareena Shakil
- Kadiza Sultana

=== United States ===
- Ariel Bradley
- Daniela Greene
- Allison Fluke-Ekren
- Tania Joya
- Hoda Muthana
- Samantha Sally
- Rashida Shikder
- Jaelyn Delshaun Young

== See also ==
- Women in Islam
- List of Islamic State members
