= Lubna Miludi =

One of four Spanish women to travel to Syria to join ISIL

- Born: 1994 (age 31–32); Morocco
- Other name: Lubna Mohamed Hammu
- Citizenship: Spain
- Occupation: preschool teacher
- Known for: travel to Syria to join the Islamic State
- Children: 1

Lubna Mohamed Miludi (born c. 1994) is one of four Spanish women known to have traveled to Syria to join the Islamic State of Iraq and the Levant. In 2019, after the territorial fall of the ISIL caliphate, she resurfaced. She has been repatriated to Spain and is under investigation for her ties to ISIL.

== Life ==
Miludi was born in Morocco but has Spanish citizenship and comes from a wealthy Muslim family. Before her journey to Syria, Miludi worked as a preschool teacher at a school next to her home in Ceuta. She spoke Arabic and English and was learning sign language at the time of her departure for ISIL territory in Syria. Her mother described her as family-oriented and was surprised when she suddenly left.

She left for Syria alone on November 5, 2015, at the age of 21, flying from Malaga to Istanbul and then traveling across the Syrian border.

After her arrival, Miludi called her parents every ten days. She said she had been recruited online by two British women she identified as Umzara and Umhayar. Police suspected a local woman, a 24-year-old who had been caught escorting another woman to the Moroccan border so the woman could reunite with her husband who was in Syria, had recruited Miludi. Members of the National Police Corps raided their suspect’s home in the El Príncipe neighborhood. She told El Mundo that she had met Miludi before but had only ever talked to her about common household matters.

Miludi told her mother that coming to Syria had allowed her to study the Quran, something she had long wanted to do, and that she was taking Quranic studies classes. She said she wanted to "help the little children who have been orphaned because their parents died fighting the Jihad." She told her parents she did not plan to marry, but she did marry Al Khandoussi, an ISIL fighter who was a French citizen, and they had a son. She and her husband were strangers when they married, but Miludi assured her parents it was not a forced marriage.

In the spring of 2019, after ISIL's territorial last stand in Baghuz, Miludi surfaced in the Al-Hawl refugee camp. She stated she had lived with her husband on the outskirts of Aleppo. She denied having ever seen or heard of the Yazidi women ISIL kidnapped and enslaved. She did not have any contact with Yolanda Martínez Cobos or Luna Fernández Grande, two other Spanish women who joined ISIL. Her husband was eventually killed in a bombing.

She was later transferred to the Al Roj refugee camp. She was using the name Lubna Mohamed Hammu. In January 2022, the Spanish government announced it would repatriate Miludi and other Spanish women married to ISIL-affiliated men, as well as their children. Miludi was supposed to be repatriated with other women that month, but did not show up at the designated meeting place; she said her son was sick and hospitalised, being treated for an insect bite. She had lost her mobile phone a month earlier so no one could communicate with her. She was not repatriated until November 2025.

She arrived in Spain with her young son and her lawyer said they had been "subjected to absolutely inhuman conditions" and that in Spain "they will live a normal life." Upon arrival she was arrested, but provisionally released under monitoring. Her son was taken into the custody of child protection services and released to his grandparents a few days later.

Miludi is under investigation by state security authorities, who claim she has “the same convictions” that led to her travel to Syria. She has returned to Ceuta and has been seen there wearing the niqab, which was mandatory for women in territory controlled by the Islamic State. Her lawyer stated she had kept a low profile in ISIL territory and "there is neither collaboration nor glorification of terrorism". Her lawyer said she never participated in recruitment, propaganda or operational support for ISIL and the fact that her husband had been a jihadist didn’t automatically make her one.

== See also ==
- Tomasa Pérez Molleja
- Luna Fernández Grande
- Brides of the Islamic State
