= Abduction of Yusuf and Zahra Shikder =

American siblings abducted by their mother into the Islamic State

Zahra Shikder
- Born: 14 May 2014; Florida, United States
- Disappeared: 15 March 2015 (aged 0); Florida, United States
- Status: Missing for 11 years, 6 months and 13 days

Yusuf Shikder (born June 19, 2010) and Zahra Shikder (born May 5, 2014) are two American siblings who were abducted by their mother, Rashida, from Florida on March 14, 2015, while their father Bashirul was on a pilgrimage. She took them to Syria to join the Islamic State of Iraq and the Levant. Yusuf was four years old at the time and Zahra was ten months old. Rashida is known to have been killed in ISIL territory and the children are missing. They may have been taken in by ISIL supporters and may still be living in Syria. The case was the subject of a Vice News documentary.

Yusuf Shikder
- Born: 19 June 2010; Florida, United States
- Disappeared: 15 March 2015 (aged 4); Florida, United States
- Status: Missing for 11 years, 6 months and 13 days

== Family background and abduction ==
Yusuf and Zahra's father, Bashirul Shikder, was born in Bangladesh and moved to Canada as a young adult, then moved to the United States and became an American citizen in 2009 or 2010. He is an observant Muslim. He married Rashida Sumaiya, a Bangladeshi-born American, and they had Yusuf and Zahra. The family lived near Miami. Bashir worked as an engineer and Rashida was a stay-at-home mother.

In March 2015, Bashirul went on a pilgrimage to Mecca, leaving his wife and children behind. Rashida was supposed to take them to Orlando, Florida to visit her parents while he was gone. While Bashirul was overseas, his wife stopped responding to his text messages. After several days he contacted her parents, and they told him that she and the children were gone but would say nothing more. Bashirul contacted the Federal Bureau of Investigation and returned to Florida. When he arrived he learned that Rashida, her sister Ayesha, and the two children had flown to Turkey and crossed the border into ISIL territory in Syria.

== Disappearance into the Islamic State ==
A few weeks later, someone from Syria called Bashirul and told him his family was in the Islamic State, and said he had one month to join them, or they would be taken away from him. About a week later, Rashida called him and told him how they had been smuggled into Syria and had their passports confiscated. Bashirul did not go to join his wife and children in Syria, but he maintained intermittent correspondence with Rashida while she was in ISIL and she sometimes sent him videos and photos of the children or let them talk to him on the phone. He received messages asking him to send money, but he refused, because he had been advised this would be breaking the law against providing material support to a terrorist group. In ISIL territory, Rashida used the nom de guerre Umm Yusuf, and her sister Ayesha used the nom de guerre Umm Sufiyan.

In 2016, Bashirul received divorce papers from a sharia court in Raqqa, ISIL's Syrian capital. The papers said Rashida had requested the divorce because Bashirul lived in "the land of kufr" and had refused to come to live in ISIL territory or send money. In late 2017, Rashida married an ISIL fighter. Her new husband was killed a month later, and nine months after that she had his posthumous daughter. The family was in Al-Shaafah, Syria in March 2018. Bashirul last spoke to Rashida on December 22, 2018; the children were with her at the time.

On February 4, 2019, Rashida's sister Ayesha contacted Bashirul and told him Rashida had been killed in an airstrike which had also severely injured Yusuf, Zahra and their baby half-sister. The children's faces, she said, had been badly burned.

After Rashida’s death, Yusuf and Zahra are known to have been in the care of Khadra Essa, a Dutch citizen born in Somalia, who went by the nommes de guerre Umm Qaqa al-Somali and Umm Qaqa al-Britani. The U.S. State Department has a $5 million bounty for her capture and accuses her of having “advocated the use of violence and encouraged other [ISIL] members to conduct attacks in multiple countries”. She is accused of being the chief Sharia instructor of an all-female fighting battalion that was formed by Allison Fluke-Ekren in 2016. According to the U.S. State Department, Essa also “led a group that violently enforced sharia law against women, issued orders which resulted in physical punishments, such as assaults and even murder, and threatened to kill anyone who wanted to leave.”

Reports placed the Shikder children in the Syrian village of Al-Baghuz Fawqani in early 2019; all three were said to be alive and in the care of a British woman who refused to surrender.

The village was the last town remaining under ISIL control. ISIL lost the last of its territory at the Battle of Baghuz Fawqani in February and March, and afterwards the children did not resurface. By March 2019, Yusuf would have been eight years old, and Zahra would have been four. Their half-sister would have been about a year old. Former diplomat Peter Galbraith said Yusuf and Zahra had “simply disappeared”.

The Shikder children’s father Bashirul has stated he would be willing to adopt Yusuf and Zahra's half-sister, who is eligible for American citizenship through her mother, and bring her to the United States if she is located. The FBI is offering a reward of up to $5 million for information leading to Yusuf and Zahra's recovery. They may be in Syria or in Iraq.

== See also ==
- Ameen family
- Cubs of the Caliphate
- Khadijah Dare
- Tania Joya
- Samantha Sally
