= Mariam Dabboussy =

Terrorists' wife (born 1992)

- Known for: lived in IS-controlled Syria

Mariam Dabboussy is an Australian woman who lived in Islamic State (IS)-controlled Syria.

Dabboussy told The New York Times that she never planned to enter IS territory. She said she traveled to Turkey with her husband, on what he said was an expedition to help his relatives escape Syria; his brother Muhammad was there. But she claimed she was the victim of a trick, and that once they were within walking distance of the border, he pulled a gun and forced her into Syria at gunpoint.

The Australian television series Four Corners devoted an episode to Dabboussy. Dabboussy raised her veil during her television interview, an act she said could trigger retaliation from the most devout occupants of the al-Hawl refugee camp. She told reporters that her brother-in-law, Muhammad Zahab, was a senior IS member.

== Early life, marriage and travel to Syria ==
Dabboussy grew up in Sydney's western suburbs in a middle-class home. She worked in child care and at a migrant support service. She was not a devout Muslim as a child, but became more religious after marrying Kaled Zahab in 2011, at age 22.

In mid-2015, the couple and their 18-month-old child went to Turkey on their first overseas vacation, where they were later joined by Khaled's parents. His brother Muhammad was already in Syria. Dabboussy said she didn't know where she was until she saw the Islamic State flag flying, and that she had been "conned by the boys", meaning her husband and his brother Muhammad, who had facilitated Kaled's passage into IS territory with his family.

Muhammad had brought at least a dozen Australians, mostly family members, into IS, including his wife, Mariam Raad, their two children; his parents, Hicham and Aminah; his sister, Samaya; his cousin, Nesrine; and his brothers, Kaled and Yusuf. He was killed in an airstrike in Iraq in 2018.

== Fate of self and relatives under ISIL ==
Three months after the couple's arrival in ISIL territory, while Kaled was still in military training, he was killed in an airstrike on his training camp. Dabboussy, pregnant at the time, gave birth a short time later. She said she was forced to remarry twice after Kaled was killed, and her second husband was also killed when she was nine months pregnant with her third child. In 2019, she and her children escaped ISIL's last territorial stronghold in Baghuz.

In 2022, Dabboussy was repatriated with her children after being flown from Iraq to New South Wales. They were part of a group of four Australian women and thirteen children who were repatriated: Dabboussy and her three children, Raad and her four children, Shayma Assad and her four children, and Shayma's mother Bassima Assad and her two children. The children received medical services and counseling after arrival.

== See also ==
- Zehra Duman
- Samantha Elhassani
- Tania Joya
- Brides of the Islamic State
