= University of Medical Sciences and Technology disappearances =

Sudanese Islamic State terror cell

The University of Medical Sciences and Technology disappearances refer to how, in 2015, dozens of students and recent graduates of the University of Medical Sciences and Technology (UMST) in Sudan disappeared in three different groups months apart in order to join the Islamic State (IS) in Libya and Syria. At least 26 people made attempts to join IS, including several sibling pairs. While most were British citizens, their numbers also included Sudanese, Canadian and American citizens. Many of them were the offspring of doctors with roots in Sudan. Most were in their twenties at the time they disappeared; the oldest was about thirty years old.

Eleven of them disappeared from UMST in March 2015, to cross into Syria and join the Islamic State of Iraq and the Levant (ISIL). A second group of about a dozen UMST people left in June to also join ISIL in Syria, while a group of five left UMST in August to travel to IS territory in Sirte, Libya.

One UMST student who had pledged allegiance to ISIL caliph Abu Bakr al-Baghdadi early in 2014 but never travelled to IS territories was Tarik Hassane, who was imprisoned in 2016 for his role in an IS-inspired drive-by shooting terror plot in London.

By July 2016, it was reported that 40 people from UMST had joined IS. Many of these people were subsequently killed and the fates of many others are unknown or unrecorded. Only a few are known to have survived.

== Recruitment at UMST ==
The students were recruited by Mohammed Fakhri Deeb Al-Khabass, a British national of Palestinian origin who was from Middlesbrough and enrolled in medical studies at UMST in 2008. In 2011, Al-Khabass became president of the university's Islamic Cultural Association (ICA). To lead a university association, it was required to be an active student. Hence Ayman Siddeq Abdel-Aziz filled in as the leader when Al-Khabass wasn't an active student. Abdel-Aziz was a good friend of Tarik Hassane, who was imprisoned in 2016 for his role in an IS-inspired drive-by shooting terror plot in London. Hassane also attended UMST in 2014, and early that year he had pledged allegiance to IS.

The ICA had previously focused its efforts on raising money for charity and on dawah, but under Al-Khabass's leadership the organization became increasingly radical. Extremist preachers were invited to speak and off-campus meetings were held where there was screening of video footage of civilian victims in the Syrian civil war. The ICA posted at least eight videos of radical cleric Ahmad Musa Jibril to their Facebook page, including quotes from him and Anwar al-Awlaki.

In one of his final posts to his Facebook account, in August 2014, Al-Khabass warned Muslim women not to post photos of themselves on social media, even if they were wearing a hijab, to avoid tempting men to sin. In July and October 2015, he published two online manifestos using the text storage website justpaste.it, in support of joining IS, saying: "Hijrah to the Islamic State", and "A Message to the Hesitant". The manifestos received thousands of views before eventually being taken offline. UMST students interviewed anonymously by the BBC said Al-Khabass tried to convince people not to pursue careers in the West and suggest they could work as doctors at the Turkish-Syrian border or in the Islamic State’s territory instead. At one point, he suspended his studies and went to Syria. He later returned to Sudan, completed his degree, and kept encouraging students to join IS. His father, a doctor who ran a mosque in Middlesbrough, said he was ashamed of his son.

The mother of one of the recruited British students would later criticize UMST, which she said had "opened its doors for extremists".

== Joining with IS units ==
The first UMST group that left Sudan in March 2015 consisted of eleven students and recent graduates. Two were Sudanese; one, Mohammad Maleeh Masha, was an American from Colorado; and one, Ismail Hamdoun, was a Canadian from Toronto. The other seven were British citizens, and this included three sibling pairs: the brothers Hamza and Mohamed Serar, Tamir Ahmed Abusibah and his sister Lojain Abusibah, and Ahmed Sami Khider and his sister Nada Khider. Two of the group members were detained in Turkey and sent back to Sudan. One of the recruits who made it to Syria, 19-year-old Lena Mamoun Abdel-Gadir, sent a message to her sister over WhatsApp shortly before crossing the Syrian border, saying “Don't worry about us; we've reached Turkey and are on our way to volunteer to help wounded Syrian people.”

A statement issued by the group's families said, “We, the parents would like to announce that our children have good intentions.” Most of the group's parents travelled to the Turkish-Syrian border to try to find them. The parents said their adult children had all been "recognised for their excellent academic achievements, social and moral capabilities", and were not religious extremists, and that they had chosen to study in Sudan because they had not been accepted to medical schools at home in the United Kingdom, which had more competitive admissions. A Turkish politician assisted the families and said their children had gone “to help, not to fight”, adding, "Let's not forget about the fact that they are doctors.”

After arrival, the UMST medics were sent to IS’s sharia training near the Islamic State’s Syrian capital of Raqqa. After training they went to work across the caliphate, including in Raqqa, Al-Bab, Tell Abayad, Aleppo, Manbij and Deir ez-Zor. They kept in communication with their families over WhatsApp but refused to say their exact whereabouts. Some of them also posted to Facebook. Their parents compared the messages they received and said they suspected the communication was censored or not actually written by their missing adult children, as they had noticed multiple sets of parents received nearly identical messages, and the messages were also not written in the way their children normally wrote.

In May, two months after arrival, Ahmed Khider appeared in an IS propaganda video. He complimented medical conditions within the ISIL caliphate and encouraged other British Muslims with medical skills to "use your skills and come here", and help build "a new society". He said, "There is a really good medical service being provided here, lots of hospitals", and mentioned "pediatric hospitals with specialized doctors".

A second group, consisting of twelve or thirteen UMST people, left UMST for Syria and ISIL via Turkey in June 2015, after Ahmed Khider’s propaganda video was broadcast. Ten of them travelled under their British travel documents, including the brothers Mohammed Adil Bashir Ageed and Ibraham Adil Bashir Ageed, the sons of a medical consultant in Leicestershire in England.

In August 2015, another group of five people from UMST, assisted by IS agents in Khartoum, booked flights to Cairo and to Istanbul. The bookings were made in order to mislead their families, who knew they had been radicalized and believed they planned to go to Syria. Some of their family members booked tickets for the same flights, hoping to stop them. But instead of flying anywhere, these five people travelled by road to Sirte, Libya, which was occupied by IS at the time.

All the members of the Libyan group were British nationals. The group consisted of one man and four women, including a set of twins, Abrar and Manar Abdel-Salam. One of the women, Aya al-Laythi al-Hag Youssef, also had a Sudanese passport, but she left it behind in her apartment in Khartoum. Her family stated she underwent a striking change in personality after embracing radical Islam in her second year of university. When she left, her family did not learn her whereabouts for two months. The fourth woman in the group was Thuraya Salah al-Deen. A friend of theirs from UMST characterized Thuraya al-Deen and Aya Youssef as “innocent children”. The only man in the group was Ahmed Gasim al-Seed.

After arrival in Libya, the five UMST medics were sent to work at a hospital in Sirte and paid a monthly salary in Libyan dinars equivalent to $50 American. The hospital provided everything they needed, including Wi-Fi so they could stay in touch with their families, but they were not allowed to leave it until they married. Aya Youssef and Ahmed Gasim al-Seed married each other. The twins Abrar and Manar Abdel-Salam married an IS commander and an IS police officer, friends of al-Seed whom they had only just met, so that they would be permitted to leave the hospital. The women were soon pregnant, and the three couples had one child each.

== Fate of the UMST recruits ==
Many of the UMST students and graduates who joined the Islamic State were subsequently killed:

- Osman Mustafa Fagiri was reported to have been killed fighting Syrian government forces in July 2015, four months after his arrival. Photos of his body were seen on social media. He had previously fought with jihadists in Mali.
- Amier Mamoun Sidahmed Elawad’s mother announced his April 2016 death on social media. She said, "He went to Sudan like an innocent white page. He loved all people and thought the best of people... We did not know that the university had opened its doors for extremists and made our innocent sons an easy prey for them."
- Ayman Abdel-Aziz was killed in an airstrike in Fallujah, Iraq in June 2016.
- Hamza Serar was reported killed in an airstrike in Mosul, Iraq, also in June 2016.
- Rowan Kamal Zine El Abidine was killed in an airstrike in Iraq in July 2016, fifteen months after her departure from Sudan in the first UMST group, leaving a husband and baby daughter who are thought to have survived. She was 22 years old at the time of her death and was reported to be the first British female ISIL recruit to die in an Iraqi airstrike. She had studied dentistry at UMST.
- Ahmed Khider was killed in February 2017. He was part of a convoy which was trying to leave Mosul when he was hit by gunfire.
- Hisham Muhammed Fadlallah was killed that same weekend, also near Mosul, though it's not clear if he died in the same incident as Ahmed Khider.
- The Libyan government retook Sirte in 2016. Two of the group of five UMST medics who had gone to Libya, the married couple Aya Youssef and Ahmed Gasim al-Seed, were both killed on the same day during the bombardment of IS sites in Sirte, but their baby daughter survived. In 2017, the baby was returned to Sudan by Youssef's father and then cared for by Youssef's parents.

Three recruits are known to have survived:

- Abrar and Manar Abdel-Salam's husbands and children all died or were killed in the Libyan war zone, and the twin sisters were arrested. They spent a year and a half in prison before being sent back to Sudan. The sisters were surveilled by Sudan's National Intelligence and Security Service after their return.
- Nada Khider, later known as Nada Saad, was detained in Syria with her one-month-old baby in January 2018, and in September they were handed over to the custody of the Sudanese embassy.

Besides Nada Khider and the Abdel-Salam twins, none of the UMST medics are known to have been able to return from IS territory. The fates of many of them, including Lena Abdel-Gadir, Mohammed Fakhri Al-Khabass, Mohammad Maleeh Masha, Ismail Hamdoun, Thuraya al-Deen, Mohamed Serar, the Ageed brothers, and the Abusibah siblings, are unknown or unrecorded.

== See also ==
- Aqsa Mahmood, a Scottish radiology student who joined ISIL
- Ugbad and Rahma Sadiq, two Norwegian sisters who traveled to Syria to join ISIL
- Ifthekhar Jaman, one of the first British men to join ISIL
- Omar Shafik Hammami, an American citizen who joined al Shabaab
- Bird of Jannah
- Brides of the Islamic State
- Islamic State Medical Service
- Tareq Kamleh
