= Luna Fernández Grande =

Spanish woman terrorist and Islamic State member

- Born: 1989 (age 36–37); Spain
- Other name: Luna Fernández
- Occupation: housewife
- Known for: Spanish terrorist and Islamic State member who traveled to ISIL's territory in Syria
- Spouse: Mohamed El Amin Aabou (2005–2019)
- Children: 5 (1 deceased)
- Criminal charges: integration into a terrorist organization
- Penalty: 3 years in prison

Luna Fernández Grande, also called Luna Fernández (born 1989), is a Spanish female terrorist who, in 2014, traveled to Syria and joined the Islamic State of Iraq and the Levant with her husband and children. She was repatriated to Spain in 2023, and in 2025 she was sentenced to three years in prison for integration into a terrorist organization.

== Background and life in ISIL ==
Fernández Grande was born to a 15-year-old mother in Madrid in 1989. Her father was Moroccan and abandoned her when she was four, and at the same age she was taken from her mother by social services. She grew up in care homes, visiting her mother on weekends, and only met her father a few times. She completed high school, but didn't get any further education and never held a job.

Her mother said she was "a normal girl" until she was sixteen and met her husband, Mohamed El Amin Aabou, a Moroccan national, after which her personality and behavior changed. Previously an atheist, she converted to Islam and became devoted to the religion. A friend of hers said she "suddenly turned into an Islamic fanatic, applying all of the clichés of that religion to her lifestyle." She was called a "veritable institution" at the Madrid Central Mosque and convinced her mother to convert to Islam also.

The last time Fernández Grande's mother heard from her was in 2013, when she moved to Egypt for a year. She gave birth to a third child there, but the baby died a short time later. In 2014, Fernández Grande traveled to Syria with her husband and two surviving children.

In the spring of 2019, after ISIL's territorial last stand in Baghuz, Fernández Grande resurfaced in the Al-Hawl refugee camp. She had given birth to two more children in ISIL territory and was pregnant with her sixth child at the time of her surrender, while also looking after four Spanish-Moroccan children who had been orphaned. In interviews with the Spanish newspaper El País, she said she wanted to return to Spain and claimed her husband had tricked her into coming to Syria.

Fernández Grande told El País that her husband told her the family would be were moving to southeastern Turkey, but instead took them to Syria, where they lived in ISIL-provided housing. After ISIL's leader Abu Bakr al-Baghdadi declared a caliphate on June 29, 2014, Fernández Grande and her family moved to a village near the Al-Omar oil field. She claimed she had wanted to leave the caliphate but changed her mind as she was told she wouldn't be able to take her children. Fernández Grande claimed her husband never fought in ISIL and was "just a treasurer", and that he been killed in a bombing in Baghuz a few months before her own surrender.

== Criminal charges ==
Fernández Grande was repatriated to Spain in January 2023, along with another woman married to an ISIL member, Yolanda Martínez Cobos, and thirteen minor children: their own plus the four orphans Fernández Grande had been caring for. The women were detained on arrival on charges of joining a terror organization. The investigation established Fernández Grande in fact supported her husband's decision to take the family to Syria and ISIL, and that her husband had played a larger role in ISIL than she had said. Fernández Grande herself had also "played a key role" and "exercised leadership" of woman members in a terrorist group called the Al Andalus Brigade prior to joining ISIL, and had indocrinated her children in ISIL's ideology.

She spent nearly two years in jail in Spain awaiting trial, before reaching a plea agreement with the prosecution in April 2025, pleading guilty to integration into a terrorist organization. Fernández Grande was sentenced to three years in prison and required to complete a terrorist deradicalization program. Her children were placed in the care of social services. In December 2025, she was ordered to serve the remainder of her sentence under a "third penitentiary regime", which allows her to leave prison during the day from Monday to Thursday and return only to spend the night. Fernández Grande hopes to regain custody of her children.

== See also ==
- Ariel Bradley
- Brides of the Islamic State
- Disappearance of the Dawood family
- Amandine Le Coz
- Tomasa Pérez Molleja
