= Houri Juvenile Deradicalization Center =

Rehab center for ISIL-affiliated boys and young men

The Houri Juvenile Deradicalization Center (sometimes referred to as al-Houri or spelled "Houry") was a facility in Tal Marouf southeast of Qamishli in northeastern Syria for boys and young men 12 to 22 years old affiliated with the Islamic State of Iraq and the Levant. The program, which opened in 2017, aimed to rehabilitate ISIL's former child soldiers and reintegrate them into society. The facility offered counseling and psychological supports. The facility was locked and heavily guarded.

Boys living with their ISIL-supporting mothers in the Al-Roj refugee camp and Al-Hawl refugee camp were supposed to be sent to a deradicalization center when they turned 12; Al-Hawl's director said, "Those kids, once they reach the age of 12, they could become dangerous and could kill and beat up others. So we had a choice, which is to put them at rehabilitation centers and keep them away from the extreme ideology that their mothers carry." Pubescent boys were also sent away to protect them from sexual abuse and arranged child marriages, as ISIL had issued a fatwa ordering women in the camps to reproduce.

Women in Al-Roj and Al-Hawl claimed their sons had been "snatched" without warning, something an administrator at Al-Roj denied; he said the mothers were notified in advance that their sons would be taken, and boys found to be under 12 who had been removed were returned to their mothers. Some of the children were allowed to return to the camps for one week every month. Syrian detainees' families are allowed to visit them, but the children of foreign nationals are rarely allowed contact with their families in the camps.

As of 2024, the facility held about 100 boys and young men. Although there were nationals of more than 35 countries represented among the detainees, as of 2021, only three boys from the Houri Center were known to have been repatriated. Only Syrian detainees were ever charged, tried, or released. Detainees who became too old to stay at Houri were transferred to adult prison after turning 23. A staff member said, "Everything is undone when these states do not repatriate their children. We are managing to rehabilitate these boys, but then they are sent to prisons and get radicalized again." The director said the inmates “have made a lot of progress in the deradicalization programs and transferring them to a prison would mean losing all those achievements.”

As of February 2026, Houri is "completely empty" and it's unclear where the detainees have been sent.

== Notable inmates ==
Su-lay Su, who was 12 years old when he was brought from Trinidad and Tobago to Syria by his mother Gailon and stepfather Anthony Hamlet, came to Houri in 2019. His mother is in Al-Roj camp and he is in occasional touch with her and with his sister in Trinidad. He was interviewed at Houri for the BBC podcast “Bloodlines”. As of 2024, Su-lay was still at Houri, but at 22 he would soon be too old to stay there anymore.

The son of Tomasa Pérez Molleja, who was 8 years old when his mother brought him and his siblings to Syria, was sent to Houri.

== See also ==
- Cubs of the Caliphate
- Orkesh Center
