= Lina Ishaq =

Swedish-Iraqi terrorist convicted of genocide in Syria

- Born: June 22, 1972 (age 54); Iraq
- Children: 7
- Status: Imprisoned
- Convictions: War crimes, genocide
- Penalty: 6 years in prison (war crimes); 12 years in prison (genocide)

Lina Laina Ishaq (born June 22, 1972) is a Swedish-Iraqi terrorist convicted of war crimes and genocide in Syria. She was the first time a person in Scandinavia had been tried for such a crime. She converted to Islam in the 1990s and married a jihadist. She and her first husband traveled to Syria and joined the Islamic State. After his death in 2013, she married again to another IS member. She was convicted of allowing her sons to be child soldiers for IS, and for keeping nine enslaved Yazidis in her home. The verdict was upheld on appeal in 2025.

== Biography ==
Born in Iraq, Ishaq came to Sweden in 1973 as a child with her family, who settled in Halmstad. She grew up in a Christian family and attended high school at Sannarpsgymnasiet in Halmstad; she played football for Astrio in the Damallsvenskan. In the early 1990s she got a degree in nursing and worked at a children's hospital. In the mid-1990s, she met a Muslim man, Jiro Mehho, and converted to Islam to marry him. Mehho was Lebanese and had lived in Sweden since 1990. He and Ishaq had a nikah ceremony in 1996, and entered into a legal marriage the following year.

Mehho and Ishaq were reportedly part of a "cult-like" environment. He was an extremist associated with a group of violent Islamists and ran a website which called for jihad. The couple later divorced, but they remained in contact with each other. Between 1997 and 2013, they had six children together, three sons and three daughters.

Ishaq wore a burqa and had trouble finding work in Sweden as a result. In 2002, she and her children moved to the United Arab Emirates, where Ishaq supported them all as a teacher. In 2005, the family returned to Sweden for a summer break, and Ishaq met with Mehho and became pregnant. She returned to the UAE and taught school for another semester. In March 2006, she returned to Sweden to give birth to twins, then went back to the UAE and got a job at a kindergarten. In 2010, she moved with the children to England, where she taught at a Muslim school in Birmingham. In the summer of 2012, she got back together with Mehho in Egypt and became pregnant again, and they married again. Although Ishaq stayed in Egypt, her husband did not, due to visa issues; he was in Turkey and wanted the family to move there.

In late 2012, the couple's oldest child, fourteen-year-old Omar, went to join his father over the holidays and did not return; both he and his father wanted to stay, and they told Ishaq the family should move. In April 2013, Ishaq and the rest of the family went to Turkey, and were taken across the border to Syria and IS territory, where they lived with Mehho and Omar and Mehho's second wife. She was one of about 300 Swedish nationals to join IS, a quarter of whom were female. Ishaq would later say they travelled several hours by car and she was not paying attention to the road signs and didn't realize they were in Syria until they arrived at Mehho's house. In June 2013, Ishaq gave birth to another son. Mehho was killed in August 2013, during the storming of a military airport outside Aleppo.

By July 2014, the family had settled in Raqqa, IS's Syrian capital. Later that year, Ishaq married a high-ranking IS member who was Iraqi. She had a daughter by him, her seventh child. Her Iraqi husband later died. Between 2017 and 2019, as the IS caliphate began to collapse, Ishaq stayed in various locations in Syria. In February 2019, she fled IS's last piece of territory at Baghuz with her surviving children and they were taken to the Al-Hawl refugee camp, where they registered under Syrian names and didn't say they were Swedish citizens. They later escaped from Al-Hawl and smuggled themselves into Turkey. Ishaq, her youngest daughter and one of her twins were deported to Sweden in 2020. The other two daughters are believed to still be in Syria.

== War crimes and genocide charges ==
In 2022, Ishaq was convicted of war crimes and sentenced to six years in prison for failing to prevent her son Joan from being recruited as a child soldier at the age of twelve. Between August 2013 and May 2016, he took part in the hostilities, and he and his brother Omar appeared in IS propaganda photographs. Omar was killed in battle at the end of 2016, and Joan was killed in combat at age sixteen in 2017. Ishaq's youngest son died at home in an accident that same year.

In January 2024, she was sentenced by the District Court to six years in prison for war crimes and genocide. According to the indictment, Ishaq kept six Yazidi children and three women as slaves in her home in Raqqa for up to seven months between August 2014 and December 2016.

At the time of their enslavement in Ishaq's residence, one of the women was middle-aged, one was in her twenties and one was sixteen. The enslaved children included an infant, a two-year-old, and four children between six and nine years old. They were from three different families in the Sinjar area and had been captured by IS after their male relatives had been killed. Some of them were freed a few months after they left Ishaq's home, but three of the children were not released for years, and one of them was still missing as of November 2025.

At her trial, Ishaq admitted there had been enslaved people in the house where she lived, but denied having bought them herself or having mistreated them. She and her second husband were lodgers in the home of the man who had purchased the Yazidis. She said they belonged to the man who owned the home and that she had no control over how they were treated, and that she and her husband wanted to move because they disapproved of slavery. She said she did not enter Syria with the intention of joining IS, but with the intention of bringing her family back together.

The court found that Ishaq had prevented the Yazidis from practicing their own religion or speaking their own language, forced them to say Islamic prayers five times a day and read and recite the Quran, forced them to do housework, and physically assaulted them, even the one-month-old baby. The enslaved women and girls were made to wear the hijab and niqab; the boys wore Afghan clothing. Ishaq repeatedly threatened to kill the enslaved Yazidis and showed them videos of executions carried out by IS.

Prosecutor Reena Devgun from the European Union's judicial cooperation agency Eurojust described the verdict against Lina Ishaq in an article in Aftonbladet as "groundbreaking" as it is the first in the world to focus on the forced transfer of children.

On 11 November 2025, the Court of Appeal upheld the District Court's verdict. Ishaq was sentenced to 12 years in prison for genocide. They noted, "The fact that, under IS rules, [Ishaq] did not ‘own’ the injured parties is irrelevant to that assessment, since it has been established that she actually did have power over them. [...] The fact that other perpetrators may also have had control over the injured parties does not change the assessment that [Ishaq] has assumed a decisive role and that she is to be regarded as the perpetrator."

== See also ==
- Tomasa Pérez Molleja
- Samantha Sally
- Brides of the Islamic State
- Taha al-Jumailly
- Allison Fluke-Ekren
