= Orkesh Center =

Rehabilitation center for ISIL child terrorists in Syria

The Orkesh Center is a facility in Syrian Kurdistan near Qamishli, for boys 12 and up who are affiliated with the Islamic State of Iraq and the Levant. The program, which opened in late 2022, aims to rehabilitate ISIL's former child soldiers and reintegrate them into society. Children stay in the program until they turn 18. Many are foreign nationals, including children of British, French, German and American parents.

== Background ==
Boys living with their ISIL-supporting mothers in the Al-Roj refugee camp and Al-Hawl refugee camp are supposed to be sent to a deradicalization center when they turn 12; Al-Hawl's director said, "Those kids, once they reach the age of 12, they could become dangerous and could kill and beat up others. So we had a choice, which is to put them at rehabilitation centers and keep them away from the extreme ideology that their mothers carry." The boys were also sent away to protect them from sexual abuse and arranged child marriages, as ISIL had issued a fatwa ordering women in the camps to reproduce.

Detainees at Orkesh live in dormitories and take classes in Arabic, English, math, drawing, music and the trades. They are permitted to play sports and chess, watch cartoons and documentary films, and maintain contact with their families. There is psychological support and medical care.

The associate director of the Crisis and Conflict Division at Human Rights Watch criticized places like the Orkesh Center, saying, "While the transfer of these boys to separate detention centers may be well-intentioned, this is not rehabilitation. This is indefinite detention without charge of children, who are themselves victims," and that separation from their families would cause the boys further trauma. The United Nations and the European Court of Human Rights have said the detention of the children of ISIL-supporting parents is contrary to international law.

== See also ==
- Cubs of the Caliphate
- Houri Juvenile Deradicalization Center
