= Gailon Su and Su-lay Su =

Mother and son from Trinidad and Tobago who joined ISIL

Gailon Su
- Born: Trinidad and Tobago
- Known for: travel to Islamic State territory in Syria
- Spouse: Anthony Hamlet (divorced)
- Children: 2

Gailon Su and Su-lay Su (sometimes spelled "Soulay" or "Sulay") are a mother and son from Trinidad and Tobago who, in September 2014, traveled to the Islamic State of Iraq and the Levant territory in Syria with Gailon's husband, Anthony Hamlet. Gailon and Su-lay escaped ISIL territory in December 2018 or January 2019 and surrendered to Syrian Democratic Forces. They are discussed in Simon Cottee's book Black Flags of the Caribbean: How Trinidad Became an ISIS Hotspot.

Su-lay Su
- Born: Trinidad and Tobago
- Other names: Abu Souleiman al-Amriki, Soulay Noah Su
- Occupation: student
- Known for: travel to Islamic State territory in Syria

== Recruitment and lives in the Islamic State ==
In 2014, Gailon met a man from Chaguanas, Anthony Hamlet, and after a short courtship she converted to Islam to marry him and started wearing the hijab. Gailon’s teenage daughter, who lived with a relative, didn’t have time to meet Hamlet before the couple left Trinidad. Gailon was in her forties and had been separated from her children’s father, a Chinese national, for a decade. At the time of her marriage to Hamlet, her son Su-lay was 11 or 12 years old.

Hamlet lived in the Boos Settlement, a Muslim community in Rio Claro which is run by Nazim Mohammed, an imam and a former member of Jamaat-al-Muslimeen, an Islamist organization which did a coup attempt in 1990. Fifteen of Nazim Mohammed's family members would join ISIL. Criminologist Simon Cottee discusses the Boos Settlement, Nazim Mohammed, and the disappearance of so many of his family members in his book Black Flags of the Caribbean: How Trinidad Became an ISIS Hotspot. Hamlet was a devotee of Jamaican jihadist sheikh Abdullah el-Faisal, whose disciples also included notorious terrorists like Zacarias Moussaoui and Richard Reid. El-Faisal called non-Muslims "cockroaches" and advocated for "the bullet, not the ballot."

Hamlet told Gailon they were going on a trip to Mecca in Saudi Arabia. Instead, they went to Syria, to ISIL territory. Su-lay later said he and his mother did not know they were being taken to Syria, and Gailon said she had been "tricked" into going. She said, "We got married on the Thursday and left the following Tuesday. I guess he had his plans, but he didn’t tell me." They were part of a group of eight people Hamlet brought to ISIL, including his second wife and their two daughters and three sons. They traveled to a hotel in the Turkish city of Gaziantep near the Syrian border, and in the middle of the night Hamlet said they had to go to another hotel. A car came and took them to Syria. When they had arrived over the Syrian border on September 3, 2014, Hamlet took his family's passports and destroyed them, and told them, "You are now going to stay here and die."

Hamlet went on to appear in official ISIL propaganda, including in the magazine Dabiq and in a recruitment video. Hamlet's second wife and his daughters left Syria shortly after arrival. Hamlet was physically abusive to Gailon, and forced his family to watch ISIL propaganda videos. In the spring of 2015, his six-year-old son shot and killed himself while imitating some of the ISIL videos he'd seen. Soon after, Gailon and Hamlet divorced in one of ISIL's sharia courts.

Gailon went on to marry four ISIL fighters in Syria and later said, "I was like a whore." Su-lay said his mother repeatedly apologized to him for ruining his life. He did not convert to Islam like his mother, and hid his Christian faith while in the ISIL caliphate. In between marriages, Gailon lived in guest houses with other women and, being too old to stay with unrelated women under ISIL's strict interpretation of the sharia, Su-lay said he "never really had a house to stay in. Sometimes, maybe a room." He took the nom de guerre Abu Souleiman al-Amriki. He did not attend school and tried to educate himself using online tutorials. In 2016, when Su-lay turned 13 and became old enough to get called up to fight for ISIL, he told his mother he did not want to go. Gailon and her son moved from house to house in Raqqa, ISIL's Syrian capital, in an effort to avoid Su-lay's conscription. In 2017, after ISIL was driven out of Raqqa, they moved to Deir-ez-Zor. They lived off a monthly stipend ISIL provided to foreign divorcees and widows.

Su-lay stated he refused to fight for ISIL, but as he grew older he was repeatedly pressured to, so he and his mother didn't go out in public much. During his time in ISIL territory, Su-lay was repeatedly arrested for using the internet, which was illegal under ISIL, and for trying to leave the caliphate, spending eight periods in ISIL detention. He said he was beaten and accused of being a spy for the United States, and called a disbeliever for wanting to leave ISIL.

== After ISIL ==
When they escaped ISIL territory to surrender to Syrian Democratic Forces in December 2018 or January 2019, Su-lay, by then 16, disguised himself as a deaf and mute woman under a hijab and niqab because men were not allowed to pass through the ISIL checkpoints. The niqab slipped and the SDF realized he was male, and Su-lay was separated from his mother. When he was captured, Su-lay falsely claimed to be an American citizen named Soulay Noah Su, and it was reported that the SDF had captured an American citizen minor. Soon it was discovered that he was from Trinidad and Tobago, not the United States.

For a year, Su-lay did not know Gailon's whereabouts or if she was alive. He spent time in two prisons before he was taken to the Houri Juvenile Deradicalization Center. He was a favorite of the staff there. Gailon was taken to the Al-Roj Refugee Camp. Eventually, Gailon and Su-lay reconnected and thereafter kept in touch with phone calls.

As of 2024, both Su-lay and Gailon are still in Syria, though Gailon's daughter has fought to have them repatriated. Su-lay was interviewed at the Houri Center for the BBC podcast "Bloodlines" and said he had forgiven his mother and did not believe she intended to take him to ISIL. He said no one from the government of Trinidad and Tobago had made any enquiries about him or his welfare. He said he wanted to return home, see his family and complete his education. As of February 2026, the Houri Center is "completely empty" and it's unclear where the detainees have been sent.

Gailon spoke on camera at the refugee camp in the documentary The MatchMaker, which is about ISIL recruiter Tooba Gondal. Gailon has left Islam and is one of the few women in Al-Roj who do not wear an abaya.

== See also ==
- Emraan Ali and Jihad Ali
- Cubs of the Caliphate
- Islam Mitat
- Samantha Sally
- Brides of the Islamic State
