= Atime =

ATIME can refer to one of the following:

- Asociación de Trabajadores Inmigrantes Marroquíes en España, Association of Moroccan Immigrant Workers in Spain
- atime, a file's last 'access time', part of the stat (system call) in Unix
- ATIME(f(n)) is the class of problems solvable by an alternating Turing machine in time f(n)
