= Ariel Bradley =

American convert to Islam who joined the Islamic State

- Born: September 1, 1985; Hixson, Tennessee, United States
- Died: November 29, 2018 (aged 33); Al Sha'afa, Syria
- Known for: American who joined the Islamic State
- Spouse(s): Yasin Mohamad (2011-2015); Tareq Kamleh (2015-2018)
- Children: 3 (1 deceased, 1 missing)

Ariel Dawn Bradley (September 1, 1985 – November 29, 2018) was an American-born convert to Islam who traveled to Syria and joined the Islamic State of Iraq and the Levant alongside her husband, Yasin Mohamad, in 2014. After Mohamad's death she married an Australian jihadi, Tareq Kamleh. Bradley is believed to have been killed in an airstrike in 2018. In 2021, her daughter was rescued from a Syrian detention camp and brought to the United States.

== See also ==
- Bird of Jannah
- Allison Fluke-Ekren
- Ahmed, Salma and Zahra Halane
- Samantha Sally
- Abduction of Yusuf and Zahra Shikder
