= Tania Choudhury =

Tania Choudhury may refer to:

- Tania Choudhury (b. 1983), aka Tania Joya, former Jihadi and counter-terrorism activist.
- Tania Choudhury (bowls), Indian bowler.
