= Yolanda Martínez Cobos =

Spanish woman terrorist who traveled to Syria to join ISIL

- Born: 1985 (age 40–41); Spain
- Occupations: shop assistant, housewife
- Known for: Spanish terrorist and Islamic State member who traveled to ISIL's territory in Syria
- Spouse: Omar El Harshi
- Children: 4
- Criminal charge: integration into a terrorist organization
- Penalty: 3 years in prison

Yolanda Martínez Cobos also called Yolanda Martínez (born 1985) is a Spanish female terrorist who, in 2014, traveled to Syria and joined the Islamic State of Iraq and the Levant with her husband and children. She was repatriated to Spain in 2023, and in 2025 she was sentenced to three years in prison for integration into a terrorist organization.

== Background and life in ISIL ==
Martínez Cobos was born in Salamanca, Madrid in 1985. She attended a prestigious Marianist school as a child, and studied fine arts in high school with the intention of becoming a painter. She did not have any education after high school but worked as a shop assistant in the department store El Corte Inglés. At 22, she married Omar El Harshi (sometimes spelled “El Harchi” or given as “Omar el Harchi el Fertakh”), a plasterer of Moroccan origin who had introduced her to Islam. El Harshi later became a Spanish citizen.

In an interview with Spanish newspaper El Pais in 2019, Martínez Cobos said sometimes she and El Harshi had to live in with her parents for financial reasons. Her husband could not find stable employment in Spain. She said she decided to start wearing the niqab, which caused people to stare at her on the street, and that she felt "happy" and less conspicuous in her niqab after she and her husband moved to Morocco. They lived in various places in Morocco and in Ceuta until they traveled to Turkey in May 2014, and then to Syria.

Martínez Cobos told El Pais that El Harshi had tricked her into coming to Syria. She said he told her they were taking a vacation to Turkey, but shortly after arrival in Istanbul, he took them to a city on the Syrian border and one night they crossed into ISIL territory by car. She told El Pais that the family lived in ISIL-provided housing in northeastern Syria and her husband had a job with ISIL's courts, and never fought for ISIL. She stated she took care of her house and four children and never went out, and that their house in Syria had no television and she did not speak Arabic. They arrived in Syria with their four-year-old son, and Martínez Cobos would go on to have two daughters and another son.

== Criminal charges ==
The Audiencia Nacional ruled in December 2014, after El Harshi was already in Syria with his wife and children, that he had been "operational leader" of the Al-Andalus Brigade, a jihadist network at the Madrid Central Mosque, recruiting people to come to Syria and Iraq to carry out attacks. During the times in her marriage when she lived in Spain, Martínez Cobos prayed at that mosque every Friday. Conversations recorded during the investigation into the Al-Andalus Brigade indicated she was aware of her husband’s plan to travel to Syria. Police also found a farewell letter, saying that a person must take action in the Syrian conflict, signed "Yolita". In a 2020 interview with RTVE, Martínez Cobos denied having signed the letter or having been part of a terrorist cell, saying "It's a fabrication. We used to get together on Fridays to eat potato omelets and read the Quran; that's what we got together for."

On March 1, 2019, when ISIL was defeated at their territorial last stand in Baghuz, El Harshi surrendered with his family. Martínez Cobos said her husband had grown disillusioned by the "sins and bad behavior" of ISIL members whom he felt had betrayed the organization. The couple was separated, El Harshi was jailed and Martínez Cobos and her four children were taken the Al-Hawl refugee camp. She told El Pais she felt she had done nothing wrong, stating, "The Spanish justice system can’t send me to prison for taking care of my home and my children." She had a fourth child after her surrender.

Martínez Cobos was repatriated to Spain in January 2023, along with another woman married to an ISIL member, Luna Fernández Grande, and thirteen minor children: their own plus four Spanish orphans. The women were detained on arrival on charges of joining a terror organization. Martínez Cobos filed for divorce from El Harshi in Spain.

Martínez Cobos spent nearly two years in jail in Spain awaiting trial, before reaching a plea agreement with the prosecution in April 2025, pleading guilty to integration into a terrorist organization. Her husband had played a larger role in ISIL than she had said. She was sentenced to three years in prison and required to complete a terrorist deradicalization program. In December 2025, she was ordered to serve the remainder of her sentence under a "third penitentiary regime", which allows her to leave prison during the day from Monday to Thursday and return only to spend the night.

== See also ==
- Tomasa Pérez Molleja
- Lubna Miludi
- Brides of the Islamic State
