= 2026 Munich Yezidi genocide trial =

Twana H.S. and Asia R.A. genocide trial
- Court: Higher Regional Court of Munich (Oberlandesgericht München)
- Full case name: Proceedings against Twana H.S. and Asia R.A.
- Started: 9 December 2024 (indictment)
- Decided: July 13, 2026
- Verdict: Guilty (both defendants)
- Defendants: Twana H.S. Asia R.A.
- Charge: Genocide (§6(1) VStGB); Crimes against humanity (§7(1) VStGB); War crimes against persons (§8(1) VStGB); Human trafficking (§232(3) StGB); Severe sexual abuse of children (§176, §176a StGB); Membership in a foreign terrorist organisation (§129a, §129b StGB)
- Prosecution: Office of the Federal Public Prosecutor General (Generalbundesanwalt)

Outcome
- Twana H.S.: life imprisonment Asia R.A.: juvenile sentence of 9 years, 6 months

Court membership
- Judges sitting: Dr. Philipp Stoll (presiding), 8th Criminal Senate

Twana H.S. and Asia R.A., an Iraqi Kurdish former married couple and former members of the Islamic State (IS), were convicted by the Higher Regional Court (Oberlandesgericht) in Munich, Germany, on 13 July 2026 of genocide, crimes against humanity, and war crimes, among other offences, over the enslavement, torture, and sexual abuse of two Yazidi girls in Iraq and Syria between 2015 and 2017. Twana H.S. was sentenced to life imprisonment; Asia R.A., who was a minor for part of the period covered by the charges, received a juvenile sentence of nine years and six months.

The case was tried under Germany's application of the principle of universal jurisdiction, which allows German courts to prosecute genocide, crimes against humanity, and war crimes committed abroad regardless of the nationality of the perpetrator or victim. It followed several earlier German prosecutions of IS members over crimes against Yazidis, including the 2021 genocide conviction of Taha al-Jumailly and the related 2021 conviction of his then-wife Jennifer Wenisch, both also tried before Munich courts.

== Background ==
Twana H.S. is a Kurd originally from Byara, a town in Iraqi Kurdistan near the Iranian border. He arrived in Germany as an asylum seeker in the early 2000s and settled in Munich, where he worked as a hairdresser in the Schwabing district before becoming radicalised at a Salafist mosque. Asia R.A. is also an Iraqi Kurd, from the town of Hawija in Kirkuk province. The two met in territory controlled by the Islamic State, married, and later returned together to Germany in 2018. A trial-monitoring account citing witness testimony separately described Twana H.S. as an "Iranian Kurd" in appearance, though this characterisation stems from a single witness's impression relayed in court rather than from the prosecution's case materials.

According to Germany's Federal Public Prosecutor General (Generalbundesanwalt, GBA), the two, by this time both members of IS, held two Yazidi girls as slaves. Prosecutors alleged that in 2015 Twana H.S. acquired a five-year-old Yazidi girl from a slave market in Mosul, reportedly at his wife's request, and that in 2017 the couple acquired a second Yazidi girl, then aged twelve, from a military base in al-Bukamal in Syria's Deir ez-Zor province. The children were held as slaves, forced to perform household labour and childcare, and forbidden from practising their own religion. Prosecutors said the couple responded to perceived misbehaviour by the children with harsh physical violence, regularly beating them, in some instances with hard objects; on one occasion Asia R.A. scalded the younger girl's hand with hot water. Twana H.S. was accused of repeatedly raping both children, while Asia R.A. was accused of facilitating the abuse, including by preparing a room for the assaults and, on one occasion, applying make-up to one of the girls beforehand.

The GBA filed an indictment against the pair on 9 December 2024 before the State Security Chamber (Staatsschutzsenat) of the OLG München, charging them with genocide (§6(1) VStGB), crimes against humanity by means of enslavement and torture (§7(1) VStGB), war crimes against persons (§8(1) VStGB), human trafficking (§232(3) StGB), severe sexual abuse of children (§176(1) and §176a(2) no. 1 StGB, old version), and membership in a foreign terrorist organisation (§129a and §129b StGB). Both defendants had been taken into custody on 9 April 2024 – Twana H.S. in the district of Roth and Asia R.A. in Regensburg, both in Bavaria, and remained in continuous pre-trial detention through the verdict.

This was not Twana H.S.'s first conviction in Germany: after the couple returned to Germany in 2018, he was separately convicted by the OLG München of membership in a terrorist organisation abroad and preparation of a serious violent offence endangering the state, and was sentenced to four years and three months' imprisonment.

== Trial ==
The court's opening decision (Eröffnungsbeschluss) admitting the indictment for trial was issued on 28 February 2025, and the main hearing before the 8th Criminal Senate (8. Strafsenat), presided over by Judge Dr. Philipp Stoll, began on 19 May 2025. The trial was originally scheduled to run across 44 hearing dates into January 2026, but ultimately extended to roughly 61–62 hearing days before concluding with the verdict on 13 July 2026.

Neither defendant testified on the substance of the charges during the main hearing. Asia R.A., who by the time of the verdict had separated from Twana H.S., addressed the court in a final statement, apologising and saying "es tut mir leid" ("I'm sorry"); earlier in the proceedings she had also described herself as a victim of her husband. The presiding judge read aloud portions of testimony from the older of the two surviving victims, who described the abuse she suffered, including one statement reported as: "Even dogs were worth more than us. My whole childhood was nothing but suffering." A representative of the GBA told the court that "the monstrous violence is so far removed from any humanity that it seems unreal."

In closing arguments, the prosecution requested that the court convict both defendants of genocide, crimes against humanity, and war crimes, and impose life sentences on each, with a finding of particular severity of guilt.

== Verdict ==
On 13 July 2026, the OLG München (case no. 8 St 4/24) convicted both defendants of genocide, crimes against humanity, war crimes, and other offences. Twana H.S. was sentenced to life imprisonment; Asia R.A. was sentenced to a juvenile term of nine years and six months, the court having found that she acted, in part, as a young adult (Heranwachsende) under German juvenile law during the relevant period.

In its reasoning, the court found that the defendants had committed the offences because the two victims were Yazidi, and that they intended – in line with the Islamic State's broader campaign – to destroy the Yazidi religious community, at least in part, as represented by the two girls. The court noted that both defendants were aware that, under Yazidi communal norms, the girls risked being ostracised by their own community as a result of being forced into sexual acts, including rape, with non-Yazidis. The court stated that both victims continue to suffer serious long-term effects from the abuse, including post-traumatic stress disorder. Presiding judge Stoll noted that the court had spent more than a year hearing a case concerning events that took place eight years earlier "in a mud house on the edge of the Syrian desert," made possible under the principle of universal jurisdiction (Weltrechtsprinzip), which he said allowed international law, described as currently under serious strain, to be given effect in a courtroom, particularly in the interest of victims of international crimes.

The two Yazidi girls were transferred by the defendants to other IS members shortly before the couple's departure from Syria in late November 2017. The older girl was freed by her family in January 2018, according to reporting on her testimony; the fate of the younger girl remains unknown, and she is reported as still missing.

== See also ==
- Yazidi genocide
- Taha al-Jumailly
- Sinjar massacre
- Lina Ishaq
- Human rights in the Islamic State
