= Nicole Lattès =

French editor (1938–2023)

- Born: Nicole Cousin; 20 February 1938; France
- Died: 31 January 2023 (aged 84); France
- Occupation: Editor

Nicole Lattès (née Cousin; 20 February 1938 – 31 January 2023) was a French editor. She was known for founding NiL Éditions in 1993.

Lattès was born on 20 February 1938. She served as director of Éditions Maritimes et d'Outre-mer before serving as director of Éditions Jean-Claude Lattès from 1981 to 1991. She was then General Director of Éditions Robert Laffont from 1999 to 2013. She was married to Jean-Claude Lattès.

Lattès died on 31 January 2023, at the age of 84.

== Distinctions ==
- Commander of the Ordre des Arts et des Lettres (2020)
