= Guest houses under the Islamic State =

In the territory of the Islamic State of Iraq and the Levant (ISIL), which declared a caliphate in war-torn Syria in 2014, guest houses, often called madaffas or maqqars, played a special role. Every town and city controlled by ISIL had one or more of these guest houses and they were all similar.

Upon arrival in the Islamic State, foreign girls and women would stay in a madaffa. If married when they arrived, they stayed there while their husbands were away undergoing the mandatory military and sharia training required of new male recruits, and until their husbands could find them a place of their own to live. If unmarried, they stayed until they accepted an ISIL fighter's proposal of marriage. Unmarried women were not allowed to live alone, but had to either live with family or in the madaffa until they married. Widows and divorced women under ISIL were expected to remarry quickly, and had to live in the madaffa until they did.

Integration officers were responsible for helping childless widows leave their homes and move back into the madaffa; widows with children were exempt from having to stay there. Male ISIL members who wanted to marry consulted with the ISIL Marriage Bureau and described their general preferences for a wife. Integration officers with the Marriage Bureau would arrange for them to meet with women waiting in madaffas, who had also specified their preferences for a husband. If, after one short meeting, the man and the woman decided to marry each other, the Marriage Bureau then arranged for the nikah, the Islamic marriage ceremony. If one of the parties did not agree to the marriage, the woman would wait in the madaffa for another meeting with another prospective husband. A woman was free to decline any man's proposal, but she was not permitted to leave the madaffa until she married someone.

The madaffas were intentionally squalid and overcrowded, and the staff were authoritarian and unpleasant, in order to encourage the women to marry as quickly as possible so they would be allowed to move out. Anna Zizola and Paolo Inghilleri, in their book Women on the Verge of Jihad, compared them to prisons. Journalist Azadeh Moaveni described them as places "of such deliberate torment and uninhabitability that few women could stay long without going mad." The madaffas' windows and outside doors were locked, there were guards posted in the yard, and trips outside were supervised by the staff. Sophie Kasiki, a woman who was convinced to travel from Paris to ISIL territory in Syria temporarily to volunteer at a hospital, was sent to a madaffa when she said she wanted to go home. She said the other women there watched ISIL propaganda videos of beheadings and talked constantly of their husbands or the men they hoped to marry.

The ISIL integration officers who ran madaffas were initially expected to make sure widows remained there for at least as long as their iddah, their Islamically mandated mourning period, which lasts four months and ten days. However, many ISIL-affiliated women reported that their iddah was violated and that ISIL pressured them to remarry before the mourning period was up, saying their martyred husbands didn't need them anymore but a living fighter did. Sometimes only days passed between the funeral for one husband and the marriage to the next.
