= University of Medical Sciences and Technology =

Private university in Sudan

Coordinates: 15.5770°N 32.5575°E

- جامعة العلوم الطبية والتكنولوجيا
- Type: Private
- Established: 1995; 31 years ago
- Chairman: Mamoun M. A. Homeida
- President: Hassan Mohammed Ahmed
- Dean: Abdalla O Elkhawad
- Director: Asma Abdelwakil
- Location: Khartoum, Sudan
- Campuses: 2
- Colors: Blue and white
- Website: www.umst-edu.sd

The University of Medical Sciences and Technology (UMST) is a private university in Khartoum, Sudan. The mission of UMST is to serve the educational needs of Sudanese, African and Arab students. It is located in the Riyad district of Khartoum. It first opened in 1995 with a student body of only forty students and two faculties. In 2017 it had become home to 5,000-6,000 students and costs US$15,000 for the school of medicine in 2018. The university has 14 faculties. In 2014 the university stated that 60% of its students were foreign.

== History ==
The UMST began as a private, non-profit educational academy in Khartoum, Sudan, in 1996. UMST was established by Professor Mamoun Homeida, former vice-chancellor at the University of Khartoum (and later Minister of Health for Khartoum State). Homeida also recruited several faculty members from the University of Khartoum. Since then, the Academy expanded to 14 undergraduate faculties, namely, Medicine, Dentistry, Pharmacy, Medical Laboratory Sciences, Radiological Sciences, Anaesthesia, Nursing Technology, Engineering, Computer Science and Information Technology, Business Administration, Economics Social and Environmental Studies, Mass Communication, and Law. It also has a School of Nursing Technology and offers 14 Master's degree programs, four PhD programs and four postgraduate diplomas. It became a full university in 2007.

Annual student undergraduate fees for the year 2016-2017 ranged from US$1,500 (Nursing Diploma) to US$15,000 (Bachelor of Medicine, Bachelor of Surgery). Local Sudanese and international students pay the same fees.

From 2014-2017 there were reports that dozens of UMST students had been recruited by an organisation called the Islamic Cultural Association (ICA) to join ISIS. ICA was banned by Mamoun Homeida and UMST was not regarded by the British Medical Journal as a university particularly exposed to radical Islamic influences.

== Faculty of Medicine ==
In Sudan, endemic diseases, mainly of tropical nature, constitute a significant cause of diseases and lay an extra burden on medical students learning. With these challenges in mind, the Faculty of Medicine was established in 1996.

The Faculty of Medicine is equipped with lecture theatres and laboratories (Biochemistry, Physiology, Physics, Dissection room, Biology/Molecular biology and Skills laboratory). The Teaching Hospital and a number of health centers were established to receive the students. Two specialized high-tech diagnostic/treatment clinics were opened to receive the students for training: Yastabshiroon Centre where imaging techniques are housed, e.g., MRI, Spiral CT, ultrasound and echo scan, EEG, EMG, endoscopy with laparoscopic surgery, laser treatment facilities.

UMST offers BM and BS undergraduate degrees in medicine, several MSc degrees (including Public and Tropical Health) and postgraduate diplomas in HIV/AIDS, Epidemiology And Biostatistics and Research Methodology and Biostatistics.

== Faculty of Dentistry ==
The school of Dentistry was established in 1997 as part of Faculty of Medicine but was renamed Faculty of Dentistry in 1998 after expansion of buildings and departments.

The Faculty of Dentistry conducts a course of studies leading the degree of Bachelor of Dental Surgery (B.D.S.) to students who satisfy the regulations and successfully pass the examinations undertaken during five academic years. The Faculty of Dentistry is located at the Academy Charity Teaching Hospital (ACTH), in Elimtidad, Khartoum, and among a heavily populated residential area which guarantees an excellent catchments of patients for training of students and within reach of transport facilities from the centre of Khartoum. The dental clinic equipped with dental units (one unit per student) is within the main outpatient department of ACTH . The Deans office, the lecture theatres and the laboratories are in one block and within 50 meters of the dental outpatient department. The School of Dental Technology share the same building.

There are two lecture halls with a capacity of 42 students each, two phantom skills laboratories with 24 phantom heads for preclinical training in operative dentistry and fixed prosthodontics, chrome cobalt /porcelain and acrylics laboratories each with a capacity for 20 students at a time.

== Faculty of Pharmacy ==
The Faculty of Pharmacy comprises lecture theatres, laboratories, a library and two teaching pharmacies which are located at the main Academy premises and at the Academy Charity Teaching Hospital.

== Faculty of Anaesthesia ==
Sudan has a lack of the anaesthetists especially outside the Center State " Khartoum " as few universities have faculties of Anaesthesia Sciences which offer a four-year BSc in Anaesthesia. UMST was the third University to establish a BSc degree in Anaesthesia after the University of Gezira and Alzaiem Alazhari University .The UMST program consists of eight semesters covering medical sciences and anaesthesia courses and was approved by the Sudanese Ministry of Higher Education, Ministry of Health and the WHO . Candidates graduate as Anaesthesia Technologists . The first batch of anesthesia students at UMST started their studies in 2004. Graduates use the titles " Second Anesthesia Specialist " in Sudan, " Specialist of Anesthesia Technology " in Saudi Arabia and " anesthesia Technologist " in other Gulf countries.

== Faculty of Nursing Sciences ==
The Faculty of Nursing Sciences started in 1999, as a part of the Academy of Medical Sciences and Technology. Apart from its undergraduate programs, UMST offers two master degrees in Nursing (in community & paediatrics) and a PhD program in Nursing Sciences.

== Faculty of Engineering ==
The University of Medical Sciences and Technology established the Faculty of Engineering in 2002 to manage graduate education and research. The Faculty of Engineering manages teaching and research programs in the Faculty's departments of Biomedical Engineering and Electronics Engineering. Specialization-Option courses are designed to introduce the students to specialization in specific areas. Students select either from among departmental courses based on their personal interests or choose one or two option sequences from among those specified by their department.

The course is 5 academic years in length and leads to a B.Sc. (Honors) in Biomedical Engineering (specialization in Bio-instrumentation, Medical Imaging and Medical Informatics) and Electronics Engineering (specialization in Communication and Control). The course is based on the international updated curricula on biomedical engineering and electronics engineering and is according to the guidelines laid by the Ministry of Higher Education and Sudan Engineering Council. The curriculum includes courses in life sciences, electronics, communication, electrical engineering computer sciences and information systems. The practical part of the medical science portion is conducted in the Faculty of Medicine laboratories and supervised by the faculty staff. The faculty has established advanced Electronics and Biomedical laboratories and workshop such as Electrical, Electronics, Communication, Digital and Bio-instrumentation, Biosensors, Microprocessor, Microcontroller & interfacing, CAD laboratories. All courses are conducted in English Language.

== Faculty of Computer Science and Information Technology ==
The Faculty of Computer Science and Information Technology was established to satisfy an urgent need in Sudan for a program of advanced study & training in the field of Information Technology.

=== Rwanda campus ===
Following the outbreak of the Sudanese conflict in April 2023, the University of Medical Sciences and Technology expanded its operations outside Sudan. The university established a cross-border campus in Kigali, Rwanda, as part of its efforts to continue medical education and expand its academic activities in the region. UMST describes the Kigali campus as part of its "GO AFRICA" initiative.

The Rwanda campus offers programs through the following faculties:

The establishment of the Kigali campus expanded UMST's institutional presence beyond Sudan and established Rwanda as an additional location for the university's teaching and academic activities. UMST currently describes the Kigali campus as fully operational and accredited by Rwanda's Higher Education Council.

== See also ==
- Education in Sudan
- University of Medical Sciences and Technology disappearances
