= Muhammad Zahab =

Australian mathematics teacher and jihadi fighter (died 2018)

- Died: 2018; Daesh
- Occupations: mathematics teacher, jihadi fighter
- Known for: Rose to a leadership role in Daesh

Muhammad Zahab (died 2018) was an Australian math teacher who recruited many of his relatives, friends and acquaintances to join him in Daesh occupied Syria. The Australian Broadcasting Corporation public affairs show Four Corners reported he recruited his wife, parents, his two brothers, his sister, three cousins, four in-laws, and their children.

Four Corners reported that Zahab rose to a leadership role in Daesh. Australian security officials considered him the most senior member of the Daesh leadership from Australia.

Zahab married his first wife Mariam Raad, in Australia. He married a second wife, Zahra Ahmad, after he arrived in Syria. He convinced or coerced at least a dozen Australians into IS, including his wife, Mariam Raad, their two children; his parents, Hicham and Aminah; his sister, Samaya; his cousin, Nesrine; his brothers, Kaled and Yusuf; and Kaled's wife, Mariam Dabboussy, and their child.

Zahab was killed by an Iraqi air strike in 2018.

In 2023, Raad, who by then had been repatriated to Australia, was charged with entering or remaining in a declared area controlled by a terrorist organisation (that area being Raqqa, IS's Syrian capital); she was the first person in Australia to be charged with this offense. Police alleged she was aware of her husband Muhammad Zahab's activities with IS. In May 2024, Raad pleaded guilty and received a conditional discharge. She could have faced up to ten years in prison for the charge.

In May 2026, Zahab’s second wife, Zahra Ahmad, was also repatriated to Australia.
