= Taha al-Jumailly =

Iraqi war criminal (born 1991/2)

- Years active: 2013–2019
- Known for: Being the first ISIS member ever to be convicted of genocide
- Spouse: Jennifer Wenisch
- Allegiance: Islamic State
- Convictions: Genocide; War crimes Human trafficking Crimes against humanity
- Penalty: Life imprisonment

Details
- Victims: 2
- Country: Iraq; Syria

Taha al-Jumailly, also known as Taha al-J, (born 1991 or 1992) is an Iraqi former member of Islamic State (ISIS) currently serving a life sentence in Germany for his role in the Yazidi genocide. He is believed to be the first ISIS member to be found guilty of genocide.

== Islamic State ==
Al-Jumailly joined Islamic State in 2013. As a member of the group he held several roles in Raqqa, the group's Syrian "capital", and in his home country of Iraq. While in Syria in 2015 he met Jennifer Wenisch, a German Islamic convert who had recently emigrated to the Middle East, at a Quran reading he was holding at Wenisch's guest house. Wenisch showed interest in marrying al-Jumailly but said she did not want to look after the household, and al-Jumailly agreed to find some household help. Shortly afterwards, al-Jumailly purchased a Yazidi woman and her five-year-old daughter Reda as slaves while on an ISIS base. The two victims had been captured by ISIS during the Sinjar massacre in August 2014 and had been sold and resold several times.

Wenisch and al-Jumailly married in summer of 2015. The two of them lived in Fallujah, Iraq. al-Jumailly forced the two Yazidi slaves he had procured to perform household chores, beating them in order to punish them for failing to obey his commands and giving them very little food. The woman was forced to perform regular Islamic prayers, and she and her daughter were physically abused by al-Jumailly, often at Wenisch's request.

In either July or September 2015, al-Jumailly became enraged after he discovered that Reda had wet the bed. As punishment he forced Reda's mother to stand barefoot outside in temperatures of around 50 degrees, causing her to suffer severe burns. He then took Reda outside and tied her to a metal window grille, tightening her restraints to the point that she was unable to breathe or stand. Wenisch warned al-Jumailly that Reda would die if left in that position, but al-Jumailly did nothing. When Reda was eventually cut down, al-Jumailly took her inside and Wenisch tried to give her water to drink, but she was already dead.

Both Wenisch and al-Jumailly were questioned by ISIS security officers about the child's death, leading them to flee to Turkey rather than risk arrest. Wenisch was captured in Ankara and sent back to Germany in 2016, where her and her husband's involvement in Reda's death became known.

== Arrest and trial ==
al-Jumailly avoided arrest, but was later captured in Greece and extradited to Germany to stand trial under the doctrine of universal jurisdiction. Human rights lawyer Amal Clooney located Reda's mother, known as Nora, and arranged for her to be brought to Germany to act as co-plaintiff in the criminal case.

Al-Jumailly was charged with committing genocide against the Yazidis. Prosecutors argued that al-Jumailly's actions had been performed in furtherance of Islamic State's extermination campaign against the Yazidi minority, and thus had the necessary intent to be guilty of the crime. He was also accused of war crimes, crimes against humanity and human trafficking. On November 30, 2021, a court in Frankfurt found him guilty on all counts. al-Jumailly fainted when he learned that he had been convicted. He was sentenced to life imprisonment on the same day.

== See also ==
- Lina Ishaq
- Samantha Sally
- 2026 Munich Yazidi genocide trial
