= Zafirr Golamaully =

Mauritian man who joined Islamic State

- Born: February 19, 1989 (age 37); Mauritius
- Other name: Abu Hud
- Education: Royal College Curepipe
- Known for: Islamic State of Iraq and the Levant member, recruiter, blogger, sanctioned by the UN

Mohammad Zafirr Rechad Golamaully (born February 19, 1989) is a man from Mauritius who traveled to Syria to join the Islamic State of Iraq and the Levant in 2014. He was notable for posts about his life in ISIL on his blog, “Dusty Feet”, and for his British and Mauritian family members' prosecution for financing terrorism. His younger sister, Lubnaa, followed him to Syria and ISIL in 2015.

The last indication of Zafirr’s whereabouts was in February 2019, when an uncle allegedly transferred money to him via an intermediary in Turkey.

In 2024, Défi Media reported Zafirr had died "some time ago." His death has not been confirmed, however, and in 2025 his name and his sister Lubnaa's were added to the United Nations sanction list and both were charged with financing terrorism.

== Early life ==
Zafirr attended the Royal College Curepipe between 2001 and 2007. His friends said he had little interest in extremism growing up. Beginning in 2012, according to one friend, Zafirr began advocating for the foundation of a caliphate. In January 2014, Zafirr began writing his blog, “Dusty Feet”. On March 14, he left for Dubai. From there, he traveled to Istanbul, then to Syria and ISIL.

Prior to his departure, Zafirr had confided in his British aunt and uncle, Mohammed Iqbal Golamaully and Nazimabee Golamaully, over Whatsapp, and asked them to help conceal his plans from his parents. His parents thought he was going to study medicine in Turkey.

== ISIL ==
After joining ISIL, Zafirr took the nom de guerre Abu Hud. Online he called himself the Paladin of Jihad. Zafirr asked his aunt and uncle for money after his arrival in Syria, and they sent £219. On his blog, he described his life in Syria and answered questions from prospective recruits. His blog mentioned Scottish ISIL propagandist and recruiter Aqsa Mahmood, as well as well as other notable ISIL bloggers, and Mahmood's blog referenced his.

Zafirr's blog provided advice for anyone who wanted to travel to Syria; he warned prospective travelers to be cautious and plan their trip well in advance. When asked what he enjoyed most about his life in Syria, he said what he enjoyed most was "living under shari’ah in the only areas on planet Earth where the laws of Allah are being implemented 100%".

In February 2015, he posted in support of ISIL’s burning of Muath al-Kasasbeh, a Jordanian pilot who was captured by the group after his fighter jet was shot down over their territory in Syria. Zafirr wrote, "This is because his bombings had the same effect on innocent Muslims. We just gave Jordan a taste of its own medicine."

In March, Zafirr's younger sister Lubnaa Rechad Golamaully (born August 10, 1992) also traveled to Syria and ISIL territory.

In his final blog posts, in September 2015, Zafirr defended ISIL to readers who criticized the group's violence, stating, "You don’t have a clue, not the slightest idea, of what the reality on the ground is,” and complaining about “a biased media hellbent on portraying us as the bad guys.” He defended ISIL's enslavement of the Yazidi people, saying the Yazidis had a belief system that was "filthier than filth".

== Prosecution of relatives and sanctions ==
In 2016, Zafirr's aunt and uncle in Britain, Mohammed Iqbal Golamaully and Nazimabee Golamaully, pleaded guilty to financing terrorism. Zafirr’s uncle was sentenced to 25 months in prison and his aunt to 22 months.

In 2024, Zafirr's parents, Mamode Rechad Golamaully and Zulekha Bibi Cassam Mohamed Golamaully, as well as another uncle, Mohamed Cassam Mohamed Hansrod, were arrested in Mauritius for financing terrorism. They were accused of transferring more than 224,000 Mauritian rupees to Zafirr and his wife between 2014 and 2019. The money was sent via different ISIL agents in Turkey. Mamode Golamaully, who was alleged to have sent a total of 44,956 rupees in August and November 2014, was deceased by June 2025. The cases against Zafirr’s mother (alleged to have sent a total of 130,000 rupees in April and August 2016) and maternal uncle (alleged to have sent 50,000 rupees in February 2019) are pending.

In 2025, Zafirr, his sister Lubnaa and another Mauritian national were added to the United Nations sanction list and also charged with financing terrorism. Both Zafirr and Lubnaa's assets were frozen.

== See also ==
- Shamima Begum – British-born woman who joined the IS
- Ifthekar Jaman — one of the first British men to travel to Syria and fight for ISIL
- Aqsa Mahmood – Scottish woman who joined ISIL (1993–2019)
- Sharmeena Begum – British jihadist (born 1999)
- Bird of Jannah, an ISIL blogger from Malaysia
