= Bird of Jannah =

ISIS blogger from Malaysia

Bird of Jannah (also known by the name Dr. Shams or the nom de guerre Umm al-Baraa) is a Malaysian doctor and anonymous blogger who traveled to Syria and joined the Islamic State of Iraq and the Levant in February 2015.

She was notable for her Tumblr blog, "Diary of A Muhajirah", which described her decision to travel to Syria, and her life once she had arrived there. She also had accounts on Twitter and Ask.fm. Bird of Jannah’s social media posts attracted international media attention and were discussed in academic journals. Most of her writings were in English, but some posts included writings in Malay and Indonesian.

She has never been publicly named.

== Diary of a Muhajirah ==
The information Bird of Jannah posted online indicates she was from Malaysia and of Indian and Pakistani heritage, and was 26 years old when she arrived in Syria in February 2015. She attended dawah courses and did street dawah with other women, as well as charity work, in her home country before coming to Syria. She stated she was inspired to come to the Islamic State after a teacher taught her the importance of pleasing Allah and told her to ask herself whether an action would benefit her life on earth or in the hereafter.

On Twitter, she wrote messages under the name “Shams”. In a series of tweets in March 2015, she said, “Islamic state [sic] is expanding. If you cant [sic] fly to Syria or Iraq... then go to Libya! Or Nigeria or Somalia.” She said Muslims living in the West, if they could not travel to IS territories, launch attacks against non-Muslims at home: “Terrorize them as how they terrorized us.”

She was a medical doctor and stated she felt compelled to go to Syria to help in the civil war, due to her medical expertise. Without the knowledge of her family, she flew to Turkey and crossed the Syrian border. In an answer to a question on Ask.fm, she said her parents "were quite upset at first" about her decision "but then they are very supportive and happy."

She wrote that she spent the first 20 days in a town in northern Syria in a house with other women. The women were brought to the city of Tabqa. There, a local ISIL emir found out Bird of Jannah was a doctor and sent a woman to speak to her. Through this woman, the emir offered her employment under the Islamic State as a doctor, with medical equipment and a house provided to use as a clinic. Bird of Jannah and ISIL came to an agreement and she started working in primary care for the Islamic State Health Service, giving vaccines to children and assessments to pregnant women.

Bird of Jannah posted on her blog that after two months in Syria, she began to consider marriage, because "life without a Mahram is quite hard and it can cause fitnah." She married Abu al Baraa, an ISIL militant from Morocco. She said she agreed to marry the man only a few minutes after being introduced to him and flipping up her niqab so he could see her face. She emphasized she was married of her “own will without being forced”.

The couple did not share a common language, and downloaded dictionary apps to their phones to be able to communicate with one another. Eleven days after their wedding, Abu al Baraa told Bird of Jannah he had to leave to go an operation with ISIL. Bird of Jannah wrote online that her husband told her, "I’m married to jihad before I’m married to you. Jihad is my first wife, and you're my second." Writing about what it meant to marry a stranger and a mujahid, she said, "What does actually matter is – heart. When you love someone for the sake of Allah, He will ‘tie’ a knot between our hearts and make the attachment strong, regardless of the difference between two of you." She acknowledged her husband's likely fate in the caption to one of her images: "Till Martyrdom Do Us Part." In one entry, she described going to visit a friend and finding out her friend's husband had just been martyred. The dead man's widow and mother were both celebrating.

According to Bird of Jannah's blog posts, foreign fighters for ISIL were given free housing and basic necessities including a stove, cooking utensils, and monthly groceries for free. Health care, she said, was also free. They did not have to pay for electricity or water, she said, and married couples and children received special monthly allowances. In an entry on 27 July 2015, Bird of Jannah posted a poem about the ideal Islamic State woman, whom she described as "the backbone of the Ummah" and "not any random Muslimah. When she was asked about slavery in the ISIL caliphate, her reply emphasized that Muhammad and his followers had practiced slavery during the early days of Islam, and she spoke of his marriages to two captive women, Juwayriya and Safiyya. She included quotes from Muhammad and prominent religious scholars on her blog about the need to obey Allah and those in authority, by whom she meant Abu Bakr al-Baghdadi, the ISIL caliph.

Bird of Jannah warned her female readers to join ISIL “only and only for the sake of Allah alone. If you think by coming here you will be always happy, you’re wrong”. She indicated she would be willing to help people interested in traveling to Syria if they contacted her over WhatsApp. Her best friend, she said, had also come to ISIL and settled in Raqqa, ISIL’s Syrian capital.

Bird of Jannah stated she became pregnant soon after her marriage to Abu al Baraa. She took leave from her job early in her pregnancy due to a diagosis of hyperemesis gravidarum. She wrote that she texted her husband, "Promise me you will wait until our baby’s birth … Promise me that you will stay alive?" and he responded, "In sha Allah."

She subsequently revealed she had had a son. After she posted about her inability to go online as she could only do so using an Internet cafe, she deleted her Tumblr blog. It had existed from 10 July to 26 September 2015. No more posts were made after the blog was permanently taken down. The Scottish ISIL member Aqsa Mahmood also had a Tumblr blog called "Diary of a Muhajirah" which existed at roughly the same time.

== Fate under ISIL ==
In 2018, Ummu Atiyah Ahmad Zakuan reported in the Journal of Southeast Asian Studies that Abu Baraa had been killed and Bird of Jannah had last been known to be living in Raqqa with their son, serving the community without a salary.

She last had contact with her family in Malaysia in 2017, and that contact ceased when the area around her house was bombed.

== See also ==
- Ifthekar Jaman — one of the first British men to travel to Syria and fight for ISIL
- Brides of the Islamic State
- Sharmeena Begum – British jihadist (born 1999)
- Zafirr Golamaully, an ISIL blogger from Mauritius
- University of Medical Sciences and Technology disappearances, a group of British-Sudanese medical students and recent graduates who disappeared into the Islamic State
- Tareq Kamleh, an Australian pediatrician who joined ISIL
