= NiL Éditions =

French publishing house

- Founded: 1993
- Founder: Nicole Lattès
- Country of origin: France
- Publication types: Books
- Nonfiction topics: Essays
- Fiction genres: Literature
- Official website: nil-editions.fr

NiL Éditions is a French publishing house founded in 1993. The name of this company comes from the contraction of the name of its founder, Nicole Lattès. It is part of the groupe Robert Laffont.

The house publishes both political and societal essays as well as French and foreign literature.
