= Sophie Kasiki =

Sophie Kasiki (born 1981 in Kinshasa, Zaire) is the pseudonym of the French-language author of the 2016 book Dans la nuit de Daech (Trans: "In the night of ISIS"), co-authored by Pauline Guéna.

In the book, Kasiki recounts her experience of having converted to Islam while married to an atheist in Paris. She got to know three young Muslim men in her capacity as a social worker; they felt like brothers to her. The men ran off to Syria to join the Islamic State of Iraq and the Levant (ISIL), and Kasiki got in touch with them online to try to persuade them to return home. Instead they persuaded her to come to Raqqa, Syria in September 2014 with her four-year-old son, ostensibly to work in a hospital.

Kasilof, who spent two months in the city, was ultimately locked in a guest house for foreign women where mothers and children watched beheading videos for entertainment. Kasiki escaped and took refuge with a local family, who risked their lives to help her cross the Turkish border and return to France.

Kasiki was interrogated by French authorities and jailed after her arrival for another two months, during which she was isolated from her family. "Sophie Kasiki" is a pseudonym used by the woman (who is Congolese) to avoid ISIS retaliation; although photographed in shadow and in partial profile, Kasiki has not shown her face to the media. She stated she faced possible child abduction charges for bringing her son to Syria without his father's consent.

== See also ==
- Islam Mitat
- Gailon Su and Su-lay su

== Bibliography ==
- Kasiki, Sophie; Guéna, Pauline (2016). Dans la nuit de Daech. Paris: Éditions Robert Laffont. ISBN 978-2221190982.
