= Tareq Kamleh =

Australian physician and wanted terrorist

- Born: 1985 (age 40–41); Perth, Western Australia, Australia
- Other names: Abu Yusuf; Abu Yousef Al-Australie; Dr Jihad
- Education: Bachelor of Medicine; Bachelor of Surgery
- Alma mater: University of Adelaide
- Occupation: Paediatric Doctor
- Organization: Islamic State Health Service
- Criminal charge: Terrorism
- Criminal status: Imprisoned in Iraq
- Spouse: Ariel Bradley

Tareq Badawi Kamleh (born 1985), known by his nom de guerre Abu Yousef al-Australie, is an Australian citizen and medical doctor who went to Syria to join the Islamic State of Iraq and the Levant. After joining ISIL, he worked in paediatrics in their Syrian capital of Raqqa, in the Islamic State Health Service. He appeared in two ISIL propaganda videos, in April 2015 and July 2017. Kamleh is currently wanted by the Australian Federal Police for terrorism offenses. Kamleh was believed to have been killed in the final battle for Raqqa in September or October 2017. In 2026, it was reported that Kamleh is in fact alive and imprisoned in Baghdad, Iraq.

== Early life, education and career ==
Kamleh was born in 1985 in Perth, Western Australia. His father was born and raised in Palestine, before migrating to Australia. His mother was born in Germany, before migrating to Australia. She was raised Catholic and converted to Islam. He attended the Al-Hidayah Islamic School and Lynwood Senior High School.

At 20, Kamleh travelled to New Zealand to attend the University of Otago. Kamleh's goal was to get into the medical school there. After a year, he failed and left the country. He went back Australia where he was admitted to the University of Adelaide, graduating with a Bachelor of Medicine and Surgery in 2010.

After graduating, Kamleh was assigned to paediatric unit in the Women and Children's Hospital in Adelaide in February 2011. After two years, Kamleh transferred to Mackay Base Hospital in Queensland from January 2013. During this time, Kamleh also worked at Alice Springs Hospital. He was a registered doctor in Western Australia prior to 2015. Consequent to Kamleh's appearance in an ISIL recruitment video, the Medical Board of Australia confirmed on 21 June 2015 that it would be suspending his medical registration to "manage serious risk to public health and safety".

According to media reports, Kamleh’s peers saw him as somewhat of a playboy. He was a practicing Muslim, but up until 2014 his lifestyle was not consistent with the teachings of Islam; he had multiple romantic affairs and drank alcohol regularly. As an intern, he won Royal Adelaide Hospital's "Golden Speculum", a joke award for the intern who sleeps with the most members of staff.

Starting in 2014, Kamleh told friends he had reconnected to his faith and given up alcohol and women. He became increasingly religious. He later said he had once suggested to his mother that he might travel to Turkey to help with Syrian refugees, and his mother threatened to call the authorities and have his passport cancelled if he did. His parents said they were unaware that he had had any extremist beliefs. He lived near their home in Perth and when he said goodbye to them, he told them he was travelling to Melbourne for a two-week vacation.

== ISIL ==
Kamleh left Australia on 10 March 2015, flying to Kuala Lumpur in Malaysia, then to Turkey, before crossing the border illegally into Syria. This was first brought to the Australian government's attention after Kamleh appeared in a recruitment video for ISIL on 29 April 2015. In June, a warrant was issued for his arrest for membership in a terrorist organization. Kamleh appeared in three minutes of the 15-minute video, which was called "Health Services in the Islamic State" and appeared to be filmed in a medical facility. He appealed to Muslim health care workers to join him in Raqqa citing "not lack of equipment or medicine but lack of qualified medical care."

He subsequently posted an open letter to the Australian Health Practitioner Regulation Agency on his Facebook page, saying he did not care if his medical registration or passport were canceled because he no longer considered himself to be an Australian. He denied the reports about his having been a womaniser and a drinker and denied having "ever taken part in unprofessional conduct which would have jeopardised my doctor-patient relationship," and said, "I have come here as there are locals suffering from normal medical conditions despite being surrounded by war, with an overt lack of qualified medical care."

Consequent to arriving in Syria, Kamleh met Ariel Bradley, an American woman who left Tennessee to fight for ISIL and was previously married to Yasin Mohamad, who was killed in an airstrike in 2015. Bradley believed it was her civic duty to marry an ISIL fighter to support the cause. She and Kamleh married after Mohamad's death. Bradley brought two children into the marriage. She and Kamleh had a son in 2016. Kamleh also had another wife, a Somali nurse who worked with him at the hospital. She used the nom de guerre Umm Yakeen.

Kamleh himself used the nom de guerre "Abu Yousef Al-Australie", aka "Abu Yusuf". He was also nicknamed "Dr. Jihad" by the media. During his time in the Middle East, according to a ruling issued by a sharia court in Diyala, Iraq, he warned ISIL about men who provided information about ISIL troop movements and supply routes to enemy forces in exchange for Viagra pills.

In July 2017, Kamleh appeared in a second ISIL propaganda video, which first showed him tending to a child who had been wounded in an airstrike, then showed him sitting in a dark tunnel dressed in combat gear with a tactical vest and carrying an AK-47, fighting for ISIL. In the video he said ISIL fighters "love death more than you love life." He directly addressed then-President Donald Trump, claiming ISIL looked forward to battling American forces. He also addressed the world's Muslims, saying, "We are under continuous bombing here and we are fighting hard to try to hold the lands of Islam... What more will it take for it to be a justified cause for you to come here to fight for Allah’s sake?"

He reportedly kept a journal during his time in Raqqa, which was found by a British soldier during the raid of an abandoned ISIL safe house in 2017. It had Kamleh’s name on it. The journal included Kamleh's feelings about the war and reports of disappointment. He wrote he was unhappy with ISIL's refusal to support an orphanage he was involved with, and also because of the way other ISIL fighters treated animals. He wrote, "I despair for the future of the caliphate."

== Misreported death and fate of family ==
Kamleh is currently wanted by the Australian Federal Police for crimes of terrorism and faces up to 25 years in prison if he returns to Australia. An arrest warrant has been filed for him in Adelaide, claiming offences he allegedly committed in Raqqa in 2015 after leaving Australia, including joining and aiding a terrorist organization.

Kamleh was reported to have died during the final battle for Raqqa in September or October 2017. Bradley and their son were reportedly killed in an airstrike in a village near Hajin in November 2018. Her daughter from her previous marriage survived her. The whereabouts of the girl’s brother, Bradley’s second child and Kamleh’s stepson, are unknown as of 2024.

After her death, Kamleh’s Somali second wife, Umm Yakeen, took in Bradley’s young daughter from a previous marriage. After ISIL lost the last of its territory at the Battle of Baghuz Fawqani, Bradley’s daughter and Umm Yakeen were sent to the Al-Hawl refugee camp, then to the Al-Roj refugee camp. The woman was hiding her because she did not want her to be taken to the United States, where the girl had been born. In July 2021, the Syrian Democratic Forces raided the section of Al-Roj where Umm Yakeen and the child were living, and rescued the by then eight-year-old girl. She was sent to a rehabilitation center pending transfer to the United States.

In July 2026, reports emerged that Kamleh was alive, imprisoned in Baghdad and in ill health. He is believed to have retreated during the Battle of Raqqa with other ISIL members and survived for two years undetected, working as a field doctor, until he eventually surrendered to or was arrested by the Syrian Democratic Forces in March 2019. He was then extradited to Iraq and has been imprisoned there ever since. He is currently one of 13 men linked to ISIL who are seeking repatriation to Australia. The Australian government had reportedly been aware he was alive since at least 2022, and told no one, including Kamleh's parents and sister back in Australia.

After it was revealed that he was alive, Kamleh was identified as the incarcerated man in Iraq whose anonymous interview with a German media outlet was published in July 2025. In the interview, Kamleh said he had lived and worked in the ISIL-occupied area as a paediatrician. He said he was troubled by the Syrian civil war and wanted to help, and after a failed attempt to join Doctors Without Borders, he decided to go to Syria on his own. The place where he entered Syria happened to be ISIL territory, he said, and ISIL provided housing for himself and his family, but he denied any affiliation with them. He said ISIL had forced him to record the propaganda videos he was in, and that he did not know why he had been arrested and detained.

== See also ==
- Bird of Jannah
- List of fugitives from justice who disappeared
- Khaled Sharrouf
- University of Medical Sciences and Technology disappearances
