= Yahya al-Bahrumi =

American jihadist and Islamic scholar (1983–2017)

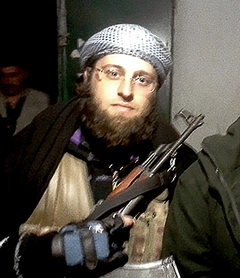

Personal life
- Born: John Thomas Georgelas; December 2, 1983 Bexar County, Texas, U.S.
- Died: presumably October 2017 (aged 33) Mayadin, Ba'athist Syria
- Spouse: Tania Joya (m. 2003; div. 2015) Unidentified Jamaican wife (divorced); Unidentified Syrian wife (widowed)
- Children: 4 sons, 2 daughters
- Main interest(s): Jihad, Caliphate
- Other names: Yahya Abu Hassan; Ioannis Georgilakis
- Occupation: Islamic Scholar, Militant

Religious life
- Religion: Islam
- Denomination: Sunni
- Jurisprudence: Ẓāhirī
- Movement: Islamic State

Yahya al-Bahrumi (Arabic: يحيى البحرومي; born John Thomas Georgelas; December 2, 1983 – October 2017), also known as Ioannis Georgilakis (Greek: Ιωάννης Γεωργιλάκης) and with the kunya Yahya Abu Hassan (Arabic: يحيى أبو حسن), was an American jihadist, Islamic scholar and supporter of the Islamic State (IS). Having converted to Islam, he studied to the point of developing "a staggering mastery of Islamic law and classical Arabic language and literature". He was close to Abu Muhammad al-Adnani, the IS spokesman, chief strategist and director of foreign terror operations.

Al-Bahrumi proposed the idea of the re-establishment of a Caliphate, and had sufficient connections and support among Iraqi and Syrian Sunni extremists to plan to threaten Abu Bakr al-Baghdadi with war if Baghdadi failed to declare a caliphate. About a year after a caliphate was declared in mid-2014, al-Bahrumi was able to join the Islamic State in its capital of Raqqa, where he became a "leading producer of high-end English-language propaganda" for IS.

In his social media and propaganda work, al-Bahrumi urged hatred for non-Muslims, called for the killing of Muslim leaders who did not support the Islamic State, and maintained irhab (terrorism) was "declared obligatory" by "notable scholars" and "supported verbatim by the Quran itself." He was also a follower of the ultra-literalist Islamic legal school Ẓāhirī. It is believed that al-Bahrumi died during the 2017 Mayadin offensive, at the age of 33.

== Name ==
Like many jihadists, al-Bahrumi constructed a new name from his first name ("Yahya" for John), and his national origin ("Bahrumi" for Roman Sea or the Mediterranean); more precisely, his ancestral roots are from the island of Crete in the Eastern Mediterranean, which is known as Bahr al-Rūm 'the Sea of the Greeks' in Arabic.

== Biography ==
John Thomas Georgelas was born in Bexar County, Texas on December 2, 1983 to Timothy Georgelas and Martha Karas. Georgelas was raised in a Greek American family that was conservative and wealthy, with a long military tradition. His grandfather and namesake was a colonel who was wounded twice in World War II and worked for the Joint Chiefs of Staff from 1958 until 1969, while his father is a retired United States Air Force colonel and physician. Al-Bahrumi grew up in Plano, Texas. As a child, al-Bahrumi suffered from benign tumors and brittle bones. As a teenager, he eschewed discipline and academic achievement in favor of recreational drugs, but did extremely well on standardized tests.

=== Conversion and marriage ===
He converted to Islam while in college shortly after the September 11 attacks, and left Texas to study Arabic in Damascus, developing a great profiency. He met his British-Bangladeshi wife Tania Joya (then known as Tania Choudhury) online. Like al-Bahrumi, she was born in 1983, suffered from benign tumors, and rebelled against her parents by using drugs and adopting strict Islamic practices and support for jihad. During their marriage, the two "often quarreled", but al-Bahrumi's self-confidence, vast knowledge of Islamic texts (he memorized both Hans Wehr's Dictionary of Modern Written Arabic and al-Khalil ibn Ahmad al-Farahidi's Kitab al-'Ayn in a short period of time), and the Quranic judgement that "Men are in charge over women" (Q.4:34), led Joya to accept al-Bahrumi's decision making for many years.

She determined that Yahya was a genius with gifts God had denied her, and she accepted her place in the world of jihad: Service to Yahya was her ticket to heaven. She endorsed slavery, apocalypse, polygamy, and killing. She aspired to raise seven boys as holy warriors — one to conquer each continent.

They met in person and married in the United Kingdom in March 2003. They left for Texas, then Syria, and London, where he followed a Jordanian veteran of the Afghan mujahideen who had proclaimed himself a caliph, known as Abu Issa, before falling out with him and returning to Syria. During this time in London, al-Bahrumi developed an interest in the thought of Ibn Hazm and Dhahiri legal methodology.

Returning to Texas in September 2004, their first son was born in California. They moved back to Texas and al-Bahrumi worked as a data technician for Rackspace Technology, but was arrested in April 2006 and sentenced to 34 months in prison for accessing the passwords of a Rackspace client, the American Israel Public Affairs Committee (AIPAC), intending to hijack its website. After his release from prison, al-Bahrumi married a second woman living in London, "a Jamaican-British friend of Tania's", despite Joya's disapproval. Marriage vows were taken over the phone because al-Bahrumi's parole prevented him from marrying in-person. Al-Bahrumi worked tech jobs in Texas, supported the presidential candidacy of isolationist, pro-gold standard, anti-drug prohibition, libertarian Ron Paul.

After his parole expired in October 2011, al-Bahrumi and Joya relocated to Egypt, where shortly thereafter a third son was born. Al-Bahrumi first made a living translating fatwas of official government scholars in Qatar, despite his contempt for their banality. Al-Bahrumi conducted online seminars in Arabic and English that did "much to 'prepare' Westerners" for the Islamic States' declaration of a caliphate, and had sufficient prestige that European jihadists came to Egypt to learn from him in person.

=== Move to Syria for jihad ===
After the fall of the Islamist Morsi government in 2013, he and his family moved first to southern Turkey and then crossed the border into northern Syria, where jihadis and others were fighting the Syrian government. By now, Joya's ardor for jihad and obedience to her husband were waning in favor of a desire for a safe and stable environment for their young children. Al-Bahrumi was reduced to lying to her about where they were traveling to, quoting the hadith, "war is deception", when she confronted him.

In Syria, wartime conditions were harsh, rebel factions fought each other as well as the government. The abandoned house the family occupied had broken windows and no running water and was in danger of being overrun by the enemy at any time. Joya and their children became sick and she demanded they leave. Al-Bahrumi allowed his pregnant wife and three children to return to Turkey though by now the border crossing was a combat zone.

"As they reached the border, a Syrian government sniper fired at them, the bullets kicked up dirt nearby, and the two adults dragged three puking children, a suitcase and a stroller across the minefield, through a gap in the barbed wire and into Turkey."

Al-Bahrumi returned to Syria "without saying goodbye or waving", while Joya and his children recovered and settled in Texas with his parents. Joya later said that she and the children had been tricked into entering Syria, and that she had telephoned her mother-in-law as soon as possible and asked her to contact the Federal Bureau of Investigation (FBI), who later told her that she would not be charged with joining an extremist organisation if she returned to the United States. She never saw al-Bahrumi again, and heard that he had remarried, and later that he had been killed. She said that she had married as the only way to get away from her "dysfunctional" religiously conservative family, realised later that she was in an abusive marriage, and later worked with the counter-extremism group, Faith Matters. Joya divorced al-Bahrumi in February 2015, she renounced jihadism, and as of 2017 attended a Unitarian church. She stopped hearing from al-Bahrumi in early 2017.

Meanwhile al-Bahrumi, though not yet in IS territory, trained as a soldier for several months and tweeted and wrote in favor of the group. He married a Syrian woman. They had a daughter about a year after Joya left Syria, and another some time later.

In April 2014, he was seriously injured by shrapnel from a mortar and had to cross the Turkish border again to receive medical treatment. Returning to Syria to convalesce, he began "pestering" the leaders of what was then the Islamic State of Iraq and the Levant (ISIL) to declare a caliphate. After the caliphate was declared on 29 June 2014, he pledged his allegiance, but was captured by forces aligned with the Free Syrian Army before he could make his way to Islamic State territory. He was eventually released and finally made it to Raqqa in August 2015. There, he served as "the Islamic State's leading producer of high-end English language propaganda and ... a prolific author" for the magazine Dabiq, writing articles with titles such as "Kill the Imams of Kufr [Disbelief] in the West" (referring to Suhaib Webb, Nihad Awad, Hamza Yusuf and others).

== Views ==
=== Jihad and caliphate ===
Al-Bahrumi believed in the restoration of the Caliphate, and that after the naming of a new Caliph, whoever does not pledge loyalty (bay'ah) to him "has incurred a great sin". In writings that have appeared on jihadi websites, al-Bahrumi urged Muslims to emigrate to the Islamic State, to not disavow the term irhabi (terrorist), and called for the killing of Muslim leaders outside of the Islamic State.

He believed failure to immigrate to the Islamic State is actually a form of apostasy:

Call me extreme, but I would imagine that all of those who willingly choose to live among those with whom Muslims are at war are themselves at war with Muslims -- and as such, are not actually Muslims.

Get out if you can -- not only in support of your brothers and sister whom your taxes have been killing, but also to protect yourselves from the punishment Allah has ordained for those who betray the nation.

He not only defended irhab (defined as terrorism), but argues it is compulsory for Muslims.

For years past, the kuffar have ascribed Muslims with irhab and for years, Muslims have sought to shake this nomenclature (often for reason of comfort in dealing with the kuffar). The word ("terrorist") has also been cast as an insult and received as such. But irhab itself is something notable scholars have declared obligatory and supported verbatim by the Quran itself."

While those Muslims who have failed to leave non-Muslim lands are apostates headed for hellfire (al-Bahrumi believes), "it is permissible and righteous" for them to steal from and defraud non-Muslims ("take the wealth of the kuffar by force or through deception"). Non-Muslim who are obedient to the caliphate, on the other hand, should not be robbed or defrauded.

Graeme Wood quotes al-Bahrumi:

The fact is, even if you were to stop bombing us, imprisoning us, torturing us, vilifying us, and usurping our lands, we would continue to hate you because our primary reason for hating you will not cease to exist until you embrace Islam ... we fight you, not simply to punish and deter you, but to bring you true freedom in this life and salvation in the Hereafter, freedom from being enslaved to your whims and desires as well as those of your clergy and legislatures, and salvation by worshipping your Creator alone and following His messenger.

=== Drug use ===
Although a devout Muslim, al-Bahrumi and his wife used cannabis and psilocybin psychedelic mushrooms as the definition of khamr (intoxicants) is a matter of Islamic scholarly debate. Yahya wrote a paper "heavily footnoted with classical Arabic sources", demonstrating (according to him) "beyond any possible interpreted doubt, that cannabis ... was used to a great extent in Muslim society without harm ..."

=== God as time ===
In an essay from his time in Egypt circa 2011–12, Bahrumi propounded a Zahiri concept, that along with the 99 names of God in Sunni Islam, there is another divine attribute, God is also Time. This was based on the hadith, "Do not curse Time, for verily Allah, He is time"; but also explains (according to Bahrumi) God's eternalness and why two of his names are "the First" (al-Awwal) and "the Last" (al-Akhir).

== Death ==
It is believed that al-Bahrumi was killed during the 2017 Mayadin offensive, at the age of 33.

== In popular culture ==
The 2022 Discovery+ documentary A Radical Life presents the story of Bahrumi and his ex-wife, Tania Joya.
