= Emilie König =

French islamist fighter

Emilie Konig
- Born: December 9, 1984 (age 41); Brittany, France
- Known for: Alleged to have been an IS recruiter

Emilie Edwige König (born 1984) is a citizen of France, who converted to Islam, and who is alleged to have served as a recruiter, once she went to live in the Islamic State. According to the New York Times, she is one of just two women whose financial assets the United Nations has asked member nations to freeze due to suspected ties to terrorism.

König was born in Brittany, France. Her father was a policeman. She converted to Islam, as a teenager under the influence of her first husband, whom she left in 2011, and started wearing a black abaya and niqab. By 2010, she was stopped by police for distributing fliers calling for jihad.

In 2012, König was the subject of a documentary, Emilie König vs Ummu Tawwab, about French Muslims who wore face coverings.

König traveled to Syria later in 2012, leaving her two children in France. She was 28 years old at the time. According to the New York Times, she eventually became "a prominent propagandist and recruiter for the Islamic State" and may have assisted in the recruitment of as many as 200 French women. She married a French jihadist named Ibrahim, aka Abu Muhamed, who died shortly after their wedding. In Syria, König had three additional children between 2015 and 2017.

According to Valeurs Actuelles a man named Mohamed Achamlane had founded a group whose goal was ""[T]o curb Islamophobia by channeling the energy of young Muslims who may be tempted by violence" ("Enrayer l’islamophobie en canalisant l’énergie de jeunes musulmans pouvant être tentés par la violence"). However French authorities concluded his group was actually a jihadist group, and raided his home. The weapons they found, and his correspondence with König, were used to convict him.

In late 2017, after years of fighting, the breakaway region Raqqa fell to militias from Kurdistan. König, and many other followers, fell into Kurdish custody. She apologized to her family, and to France, and pleaded to be repatriated. On January 11, 2018, the New York Times profiled her, and described the difficult choices her plea for repatriation posed for policy makers in France.

In November 2019 France Info announced that Kurdish forces planned to deport 11 French citizens back to France. They speculated over who would or wouldn't be deported, noting König and two other individuals had been characterized as showing signs of still being dangerously radicalized.

In 2022, König was repatriated back to France from the Al Roj camp in North Eastern Syria by the Kurdish. In September 2025, she was indicted for joining the Islamic State and participating in its propaganda efforts. She will stand trial in November 2026.
