= Éditions Robert Laffont =

French publisher

- Parent company: Editis
- Founded: 1941
- Founder: Robert Laffont
- Country of origin: France
- Publication types: Books
- Official website: www.laffont.fr

Éditions Robert Laffont (French pronunciation: [edisjɔ̃ ʁɔbɛʁ lafɔ̃]) is a book publishing company in France founded in 1941 by Robert Laffont (1916–2010). Its publications are distributed in almost all francophone countries, but mainly in France, Canada and in Belgium.

Imprints belonging to Éditions Robert Laffont include éditions Julliard, les Seghers, Foreign Rights and NiL Éditions. In 1990, Éditions Robert Laffont was acquired by the French publishing group Groupe de La Cité. It is now part of Editis.

Éditions Robert Laffont published the Quid encyclopedia from 1975 to 2007 but its 2008 edition was not published after annual sales had fallen from a high of 400,000 to less than 100,000, apparently because of competition from online information sources such as Wikipedia.

== Selected publications ==
- Diapason (Éditions Robert Laffont) (1991). Dictionary of discs and compact: Guide criticizes enregistrée classical music / Dictionnaire des disques et des compacts: Guide critique de la musique classique enregistrée. Paris: R. Laffont. pp. 4e édition. ISBN 2-221-06682-0. OCLC 28100158.
- Éditions Robert Laffont; Bompiani (Firm) (1999). Encyclopedic dictionary of French literature / Dictionnaire encyclopédique de la littérature française. Paris: R. Laffont. pp. Bouquins. ISBN 2-221-08953-7. OCLC 41482549.
- Éditions Robert Laffont; Bompiani (Firm) (1994). The new dictionary of the authors: all time and all countries / Le nouveau dictionnaire des auteurs: de tous les temps et de tous les pays. Paris: R. Laffont. pp. Nouv. éd. actualisée. ISBN 2-221-06888-2. OCLC 32859170.
- Éditions Robert Laffont; Bompiani (Firm) (1994). The new dictionary of writings: all time and all countries / Le nouveau dictionnaire des œuvres: de tous les temps et de tous les pays. Paris: R. Laffont. pp. Nouv. éd. actualisée. ISBN 2-221-06887-4. OCLC 32468859.
- Kasiki, Sophie; Guéna, Pauline (2016). Dans la nuit de Daech. Paris: Éditions Robert Laffont. ISBN 978-2221190982.
- Frémy, Michèle (1979). Big Quid illustrates: everything for all in eighteen very coloured volumes / Grand Quid illustre: tout pour tous en dix-huit volumes tout en couleurs. Paris: R. Laffont. OCLC 62984148.
- Mayére, Pierre; V. Bedin (1982). Grand Quid illustrates: the history of the world / Le Grand Quid illustré: l'histoire du monde. Paris: R. Laffont. ISBN 2-221-50361-9. OCLC 10303872.

== Book series ==
- Ailleurs et Demain
- Arizona
- Best Sellers
- Bouquins
- Libertés
- Libertés 2000
- Pavillons
- Pavillons Poche
- Plein Vent
- Vécu
