= Islam and slavery =

Islam and slavery may refer to:

- Islamic views on slavery
- Islamic views on concubinage
- History of slavery in the Muslim world
- History of concubinage in the Muslim world
- Arab slave trade
- Saqaliba
- Slavery in 21st-century jihadism
- Ma malakat aymanukum
