= Islamic State Health Service =

ISIS-run health service (2015–2019)

- Islamic State

Geography
- Location: Iraq; Syria

Organisation
- Religious affiliation: Islamic State ideology

History
- Constructed: 2014
- Closed: 2019

Islamic State Health Service (ISHS) (Arabic: الخدمات الصحية للدولة الإسلامية, romanized: al-Khidmāt al-ṣiḥḥīyah lil-dawlah al-Islāmīyah) was a health care service run by the Islamic State of Iraq and the Levant. It was first shown in a propaganda video, with the video presentation and logo resembling those of the NHS.

== History ==
Anonymous IS blogger "Bird of Jannah", a doctor originally from Malaysia, said she was invited to work for ISIL shortly after her arrival in Syria in the spring of 2014, before ISIL declared a caliphate. They offered to provide her a building and all the equipment necessary to use as a clinic. She agreed to work in primary care, giving vaccines to children and assessments to pregnant women.

The health service was shown in 2015 in a propaganda video which said the "western media" was lying, and to show health advancements that the Islamic State had done. The service was explained by a Melbourne-born Australian, under the alias of Abu Yusuf. He was subsequently identified as pediatrician Tareq Kamleh. He appealed to Muslim medical personnel to join him in ISIL's Syrian capital of Raqqa because, he said, "Muslims are really suffering from not lack of equipment or medicine but lack of qualified medical care."

The first buildings to be established by ISHS were constructed in Raqqa, Syria and Mosul, Iraq. It would then start growing in Iraq more in places like Mosul and Tikrit, this would also boost more propaganda calling for Sunni Muslims, specifically British and Australian to join the Islamic State and join the medical forces there. The service provided mass polio vaccines and cancer treatment for people living under Islamic State rule in Mosul hospitals. The United States Air Force would launch attacks against hospitals used to treat militants to degrade the Islamic State's fighting capabilities.

== See also ==
- Tareq Kamleh
- Bird of Jannah
