= Allison Fluke-Ekren =

American woman who joined ISIL and commanded a battalion

Allison Elizabeth Fluke-Ekren
- Born: 1980 (age 45–46); Lawrence, Kansas
- Other names: Allison Elizabeth Brooks, Allison Ekren, Umm Mohammed al-Amriki. Umm Mohammed, Umm Jabril
- Education: University of Kansas
- Occupation: teacher
- Known for: American woman who joined the Islamic State and founded an all-female battallion, Khatibah Nusaybah
- Children: 11 (2 deceased)
- Criminal charges: providing material support and resources to a foreign terrorist organization
- Penalty: 20 years in prison

Allison Elizabeth Fluke-Ekren (born 1980) is an American woman who joined the Islamic State of Iraq and the Levant (ISIL) in Syria and was in charge of an all-female ISIL battalion called Khatibah Nusaybah. In 2022 she pleaded guilty to providing material support and resources to a foreign terrorist organization and was sentenced to the maximum term of 20 years in prison. The prosecution described her as an "empress" of ISIL.

== Background and education ==
Fluke-Ekren was born in Lawrence, Kansas and grew up on an 81-acre farm in Overbrook, Kansas. She attended the Topeka Collegiate School and Topeka High School. Her parents described her as manipulative, and when they were children she once tried to drown her brother in a lake. She married in 1996 at age 16 and had a son and daughter. Her first husband would later call her a "con artist" and a "cheat". In 2002, the couple divorced. That same year, Fluke-Ekren converted to Islam.

While attending the University of Kansas she met her second husband, Volkan Ekren, a Turkish international student. They married in 2002 after Fluke-Ekren's divorce, and would have five children together. Fluke-Ekren studied biology at the University of Kansas, then taught at the Islamic School of Greater Kansas City.

== Early involvement in terrorism ==
In around 2008, Fluke-Ekren moved to Cairo, Egypt with Volkan and the children. Investigators believe she radicalized him. A friend who knew her in Kansas and in Egypt stated the Arab Spring deeply impacted her. The friend realized she had been radicalized and told others who knew Fluke-Ekren about her concerns, but they didn't believe her. Fluke-Ekren's children stated she physically abused them during this time, and her oldest son left Egypt to live with his father in the United States.

In 2011, the family moved to Libya. Volkan joined the Al-Qaeda-aligned Salafi Jihadist militia group Ansar al-Sharia. Fluke-Ekren wanted to start a military training center for young women and hoped Ansar al-Sharia would fund it, but nothing came of the idea. After Ansar al-Sharia's 2012 attack on the U.S. Special Mission and CIA Annex in Benghazi, her husband removed a box of government documents and at least one electronic device from the American consulate, and Fluke-Ekren helped him review and summarize the stolen material so they could give it to Ansar al-Sharia's leadership. Fluke-Ekren also recruited a Libyan woman to travel to Syria and carry out a suicide attack. The woman reconsidered the plan after she realized she was pregnant, but Fluke-Ekren convinced her to go ahead and promised to adopt her child, which she did.

In late 2012 or early 2013, Fluke-Ekren traveled with her husband and children to Turkey and then to Syria, because she wanted to wage "violent jihad" and was disappointed with Ansar al-Sharia's lack of violence in Libya. They joined Al-Nusra Front, and her husband worked for them as a translator. The family lived in an abandoned factory in Aleppo. Fluke-Ekren wanted to establish an Al-Nusra battalion for women and girls, but the organization refused, so she made her daughter, then age ten and sick with typhoid fever, do military training. After about six weeks, Fluke-Ekren took her daughter to Turkey to get her medical attention, leaving her husband in Syria. He eventually left Al-Nusra and became a leader in ISIL.

== ISIL ==
In mid-2014, Fluke-Ekren was smuggled back into Syria. Witnesses said she was talking about committing a terrorist attack on United States soil. She presented an attack plan to ISIL's leader, Abu Bakr Al-Baghdadi, who approved funding for it, but the attack was put on hold when Fluke-Ekren became pregnant. Volkan wanted to carry out a suicide attack, but ISIL refused permission, saying he was too valuable to them.

In 2015, the family moved to Mosul, Iraq, which was under ISIL control at the time, and Fluke-Ekren helped care for widows of ISIL fighters. They then returned to Syria, and Volkan was killed in an airstrike. Fluke-Ekren got married again twice, once to a Bangladeshi ISIL fighter, and after his death eight months later, to an ISIL military leader responsible for the defense of Raqqa, ISIL's Syrian capital. She gave birth to four more children. Two of her children, an infant and a five-year-old boy, died in Syria.

Fluke-Ekren brought her children into ISIL territory against their wishes. When her daughter was thirteen, Fluke-Ekren forced her to marry an ISIL fighter who raped her. In 2016, Fluke-Ekren founded a women's center in Raqqa. As well as providing education services, medical services and child care, the women's center provided training to women and young girls on the use of grenades, AK-47 rifles, car bombs and suicide belts. She trained over 100 women and girls as young as ten years old. In late 2016, Fluke-Ekren established the Khatiba Nusaybah, an all-female battalion which began operations on ISIL's behalf in early 2017.

Later that year, Fluke-Ekren’s daughter, by then fifteen years old and pregnant, her ISIL husband dead, escaped ISIL territory and returned to Kansas to give birth. Fluke-Ekren was still in Syria, and asked someone to send a message to her family and trick them into thinking she was dead. But her daughter believed her mother would try to contact her, so she set up a social media account and coordinated with the FBI to record her communications with her mother. In December 2020, Fluke-Ekren did contact her daughter, and the FBI learned her whereabouts.

== Return to the United States and charges ==
Fluke-Ekren had continued to work for ISIL until 2019, when it lost the last of its territory at the Battle of Baghuz Fawqani. She was taken into custody of the PKK and held between January and March 2019, before being released or transferred. From June 2021 to January 2022, she was detained by Turkish authorities and held in a Turkish prison. She was then transferred to American custody and extradited to the United States. In June 2022, she pleaded guilty to terrorism charges.

In November 2022, she was sentenced to twenty years in prison, though she asked for a two-year sentence so she could continue to care for her young children. She claimed her family had "lived a very normal life" in Syria and said the military training she'd provided in Raqqa had just been for self-defense. Fluke-Ekren's immediate family all wanted her to be punished to the maximum extent. Many of them asked that she be prohibited from contacting them.

In a letter to the court, two of her now-adult children described her as a "monster" who had sexually abused them. Her son stated, "My mother is a monster who enjoys torturing children for sexual pleasure... My mother is a monster without love for her children, without an excuse for her actions." At sentencing, Fluke-Ekren denied having abused her children or having forced her thirteen-year-old daughter to marry, claiming it was the daughter’s decision, and said, "I deeply regret my choices."

As of 2022, Fluke-Ekren's oldest daughter is missing, one of her sons is in Turkey, and six of her other children are in foster care in Virginia. Her oldest son and the daughter who escaped from ISIL both live in Kansas.

Fluke-Ekren considers herself to be married to Mohammed Azharuddin Chhipa, a naturalized American citizen from India, but the marriage ceremony was conducted online and is not legal. He made attempts to adopt her children. In May 2023, Chhipa was arrested for supporting ISIL. He had accepted money from an undercover FBI agent and other donors, converted it to cryptocurrency and sent it to ISIL, in order to smuggle female ISIL members out of detention camps. He was convicted on all counts in December 2024. Chhipa was sentenced to thirty years in prison.

== See also ==
- Emraan Ali and Jihad Ali
- Brides of the Islamic State
- Khadijah Dare
- Sally-Anne Jones
- Tomasa Pérez Molleja
- Samantha Sally
