= Asociación de Trabajadores Inmigrantes Marroquíes en España =

Asociación de Trabajadores Inmigrantes Marroquíes en España (English, Association of Moroccan Immigrant Workers in Spain, ATIME) was founded in 1989 by an initiative of a group of Moroccan immigrants to Spain in order to defend their rights. The association is based in Madrid but also present in Andalusia and Catalonia. The president of the Association is Mohamed Kamal Rahmouni.

ATIME develops projects for the integration of Moroccan immigrants in Spain, among other programs such as housing, education and culture, etc.

== Government plan, 2008 ==
The president of ATIME defended immigrant workers in October 2008 when the Spanish government brought the new Plan of Voluntary Return into effect. Under the new plan, immigrant workers who had lost their jobs would be offered unemployment benefits as a lump sum payment, with one proviso, they agree to leave the country.

One of many immigrant associations in Spain to come out against the plan, president of ATIME Kamal Rahmouni said, "Until recently, while the economy was booming, immigrants were the solution." "Now it's as if they're saying immigrants are the problem. The plan tells society that immigrants are responsible for the economic crisis."

Moroccans, who comprise the second largest immigrant group in Spain, are perhaps even more reluctant. In a poll conducted by ATIME, only 8% said they would be willing to renounce their visas and return to Morocco for three years in exchange for the payout.
