= Moroccans in Spain =

Part of the Moroccan diaspora

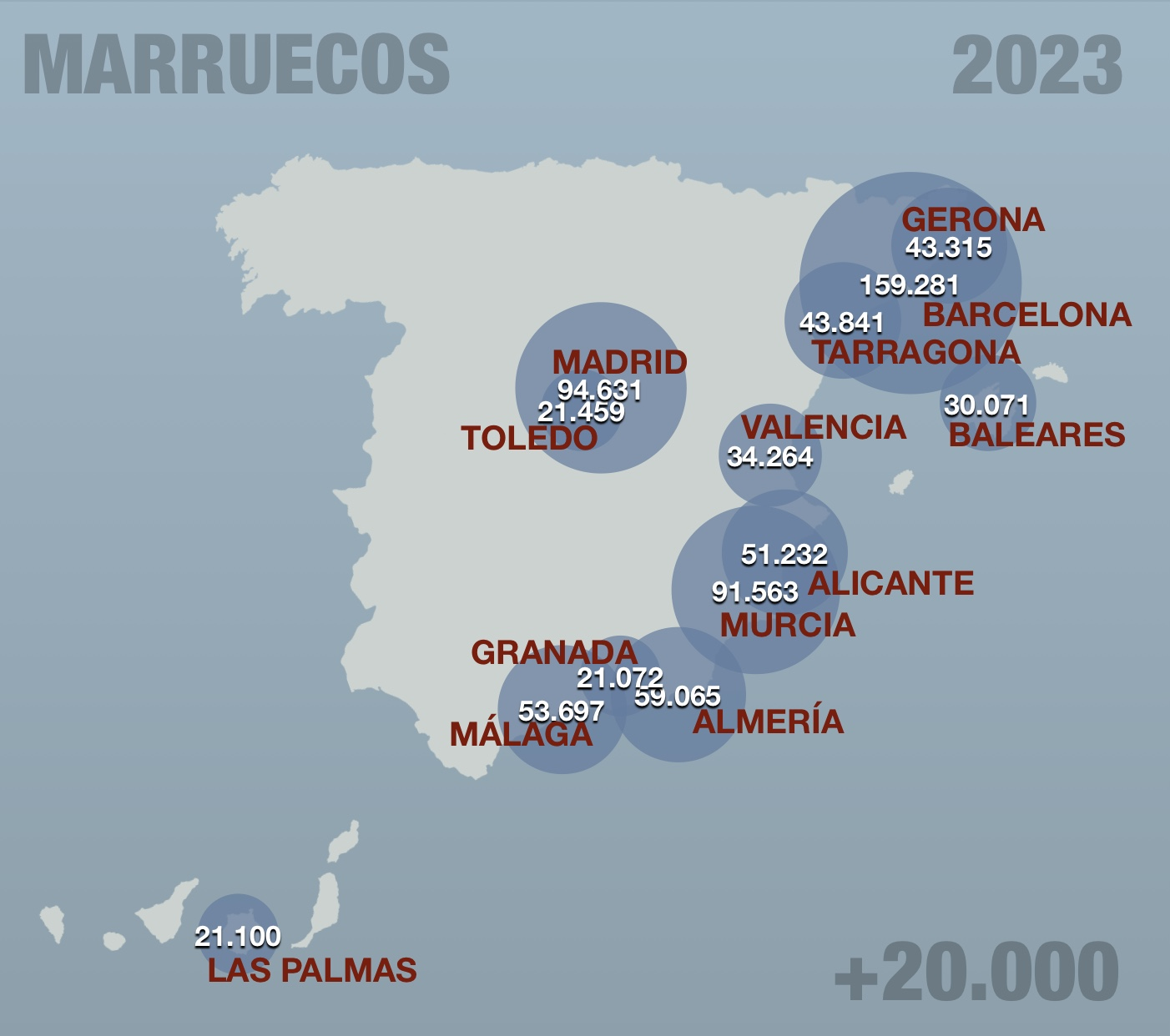
- Population map of Moroccan immigrants in Spanish cities

Total population
- 1,165,955 (2025)

Languages
- Moroccan Arabic, Berber, Haketia, Spanish, French

Religion
- Majority Sunni Islam, minority Judaism, Christianity and irreligion

Moroccans in Spain (Arabic: المغاربة في إسبانيا; Spanish: Marroquíes en España) are the citizens and residents of Spain who are of Moroccan descent. As of 2025, 1,165,955 Moroccans live in Spain, making them the country's largest immigrant group.

== Migration history ==
Before 1985, Moroccans did not require visas to enter Spain. Many young came for seasonal or short-term work in agriculture and industry, coming and going from Spain without settling there. A new visa law implemented that year, La Ley de Extranjeria, was quite restrictive, and did not provide for permanent residence permits. In 1989, the Asociación de Trabajadores Inmigrantes Marroquíes en España was formed by a group of Moroccan workers to defend their working rights. As late as 1992, official statistics showed only 16,665 Moroccans residing in Spain (of whom 14,998 lived in peninsular Spain). In the following years, many Moroccans came to occupy jobs in the agricultural, hospitality, construction, and service sectors. By 2000, their population had increased to 201,182 individuals. Along with the growing numbers of immigrants, their composition also shifted, with a higher proportion of women among them.

2000 also marked a significant shift in Spanish immigration laws; Law 4/2000 passed that year created mechanisms for family reunification, regularisation of illegal migrants, and acquisition of permanent residency. By 2008, official statistics showed 752,695 legal Moroccan residents of Spain. Beginning in September that year, Spanish authorities offered payments to unemployed immigrants if they agreed to cancel their residency and leave the country. With official statistics showing 82,262 unemployed Moroccans in Spain, there were expected to be many who would take advantage of the payments. However, according to provisional figures, the Moroccan population of Spain continued to grow during the year, and had reached 858,000 by the beginning of 2011, 8.8% higher than the 2008 total.

From 2000 to 2016, 211,709 Moroccans were naturalised as Spanish nationals. In the period 2010–2015 alone, 127,474 gained nationality. In the 2015–16 school year, 174,774 Moroccans were in Spanish schools.

As of 2018, Catalonia had the most Moroccans out of any autonomous community, numbering 209,920. The Region of Murcia had the second most at 79,482.

== See also ==
- Morocco–Spain relations
- Algerians in Spain
- Arabs in Spain
- Riffians
