= Cubs of the Caliphate =

Child soldier recruitment program

The Cubs of the Caliphate (Arabic: أشبال الخلافة, romanized: Ashbal al-Khilafah) referred to a programme ran by the Islamic State (IS) to recruit and train child soldiers between the ages of 10 and 15. The "Cubs" were active from 2014 to 2017; after this point, the programme was seemingly discontinued as IS-Central's territorial control in Syria and Iraq collapsed. However, systematic child soldier training was revived by IS in 2021/22.

== Overview ==
After it established a proto-state in the Middle East in 2014, IS was quick to organize camps to train child soldiers, called "Cubs". Children as young as six were recruited or kidnapped and sent to the Islamic State's military and religious training camps during the proto-state's heyday. In the camps, the children practiced beheading with dolls and were indoctrinated with the religious views of IS. Children were also used as human shields on the front lines and to provide blood transfusions for Islamic State soldiers, according to Shelly Whitman of the Roméo Dallaire Child Soldiers Initiative. In general, IS recruiters tried to encourage children to volunteer instead of kidnapping them, promising both earthly as well as heavenly rewards. The group also spread its views through propaganda in schools. According to a UN report in 2014, "in mid-August, ISIL entered a cancer hospital in Mosul, forced at least two sick children to hold the ISIL flag and posted the pictures on the internet." Misty Buswell, a Save the Children representative working with refugees in Jordan, said that "it's not an exaggeration to say we could lose a whole generation of children to trauma." In November 2014, the ISIS released a propaganda video showing children from Kazakhstan being trained with firearms. The video showed the steps of the boys' training and emphasized the "holy-warrior" image of IS by showing the boys recite the verses from the Quran and declaring war against the "unbelievers": — "I will be the one who slaughters you, O kuffar (non-believer). I will be a mujahid, insha'Allah (God willing.)".

By 2017, the control of IS over its territory in Syria and Iraq was collapsing. The "Cubs" were consequently fielded in large numbers to help defend the remaining strongholds of IS, notably fighting in the Battle of Raqqa. After 2017, there were no more reports of IS "Cubs". However, the Islamic State's West Africa Province (ISWAP) had established a similar programme by late 2021, as it showcased a cadet school in a propaganda video published in January 2022. Soon after, IS-affiliated media channel an-Najiyah published an Indonesian document which encouraged the training of child soldiers, evidently aimed at the Southeast Asian branches of IS.

== Known IS child soldier units ==
- Putera Khilafa (Princes of the Caliphate) – Southeast Asian child soldier unit, active in the Islamic State's al-Barakah Province by 2016
- "Khilafah Cadet School" – A training unit for child soldiers aged 8–16, established by ISWAP in late 2021. The training programme includes religious lessons, Arabic language classes, physical and military training. The trainees have been filmed executing captured soldiers.

== See also ==
- Lion Cubs
- Khadijah Dare
- Samantha Sally
- Khaled Sharrouf
