= Samantha Sally =

American woman who lived in the Islamic State (born 1984/1985)

- Born: Samantha Marie Sally; 1984 or 1985; United States
- Other name: Samantha Elhassani
- Known for: Living in the Islamic State
- Spouse: Mousa Elhassani (2012-2017)
- Children: 4
- Status: Convicted
- Criminal charge: Financing terrorism
- Penalty: 78 months in prison, 3 years of supervised release

Samantha Marie Sally, also known as Samantha Elhassani (born 1984 or 1985), is an American woman who lived with her husband and children in the Islamic State between 2015 and 2017. Sally has maintained she was tricked into traveling to the Islamic State by her husband, and was not a supporter of the group. In 2020, she was sentenced to six and a half years in prison in the United States for providing financial support to a terrorist group. She was later released on April 1, 2024, after serving 3 years, 4 months in prison (1,239 days)

== Early life ==
Sally grew up in Lowell, Arkansas. She and her sister, Lori, were raised in a strict household and their parents became Jehovah's Witnesses when they were very young. Their parents forbade music, television, and the celebration of birthdays and secular holidays. They were not allowed to participate in extracurricular activities at school and their mother even discouraged them from doing homework. The two girls faced corporal punishment and, according to Lori, were sexually abused by an adult relative. Both sisters were eventually disfellowshipped from the Jehovah's Witnesses.

Sally did not complete high school; her parents removed her from school in the eighth grade when she was fourteen, so she could work full-time. When she was fifteen, she was raped by an older man. She married her first husband at age sixteen in 2001, but her husband was abusive and violent and the marriage was short-lived.

Sally had one son in 2007, while living in Oklahoma. She had met her then-partner in 2004, while working as a vacuum cleaner salesperson, but the couple parted ways in 2009. Sally moved to Elkhart, Indiana in 2011 to live with her sister, Lori, after being laid off from a job in Oklahoma. The two worked at a package forwarding company, where Samantha met Moussa Elhassani, a brother of Lori's husband. His family owned the company. Elhassani, a non-observant Muslim, had been born in Morocco and moved to the U.S. in the early 2000s. Sally and Elhassani began dating, and married on July 23, 2012. In June 2013, Sally had a daughter. Over time the relationship became emotionally and physically abusive, and Elhassani abused drugs and was unfaithful. At one point Samantha was approached by the FBI, who asked her to become an informant on her job, and send them information on "any types of suspicious shipments of a criminal or national security nature", including logging details of items and their destinations, and she agreed.

== Life in the Islamic State ==
Over Thanksgiving weekend in November 2014, Elhassani told Sally he wanted to join the Islamic State and "fight in the cause of Islam," and live under sharia. Sally and Elhassani began preparing to leave the country, telling people they were going to move to Morocco where Elhassani's parents lived. Sally and her husband took cash from their bank accounts and used the money to buy precious metals. They would buy $97,000 in gold and other precious metals between November and the time they crossed into Syria.

Sally lied to her son's father, saying Elhassani's mother was dying in France and they were going to visit her and this was why their son needed a passport. On January 11, 2015, she flew to Morocco with her two children and stayed with Elhassani's family in Rabat; the trip was so she could smuggle some of their cash and gold out of the country. During her time there, one of Elhassani's family members confronted her about his interest in the Islamic State, and Sally said, "I support my husband and I will follow him anywhere." After she returned to the US, she and Elhassani began selling their vehicles and furniture, and Sally stopped taking her son to school. When the school asked about his absences, she told them the family was moving to Mexico and she would be homeschooling her son until they left. She told her FBI handler that the family was temporarily relocating to Rabat so Elhassani's father, whom she said was a doctor (he was in fact an engineer), could perform knee surgery on her for free.

On March 22, 2015, Sally and her family took a flight from Chicago to Hong Kong, with a layover in Beijing. She had previously opened a safety deposit box in Hong Kong and taken $30,000 in cash and gold there. While in Hong Kong, they were joined by Elhassani's brother, Abdelhadi. During that time, Sally's PayPal account was used to purchase six pairs of image-stabilizing binoculars, which she picked up from a local seller, and she also picked up a tactical rifle scope purchased on her eBay account. Sally says it was only at this point that she realized that not only did her husband and his brother intend to join the Islamic State, but that Elhassani planned to take their daughter as well. She said she didn't contact the authorities because she was afraid he would flee with their daughter.

On April 7, the family and Abdelhadi flew to Istanbul. They had a flight to Morocco scheduled for the next day, but instead, Elhassani suggested they instead take a ten-day vacation in Turkey before he and Abdelhadi went to Syria. After a few days they arrived in Sanliurfa, a city in southeastern Turkey. Abdelhadi made contact with an Islamic State member to facilitate their crossing into Syria. Elhassani told Sally to pack their things, saying they were going to the airport. They loaded everything into a van, which took them to the Turkish/Syrian border. Elhassani grabbed their daughter, and began walking. Sally said she followed with her son so as not to lose track of her daughter, figuring she could later cross back across the Syrian border.

After crossing the border in territory controlled by the Islamic State, Sally and her children were separated from Elhassani and his brother. Sally and her children stayed in an IS guest house for women and children, and her husband and brother-in-law went to IS military training. They were reunited after arriving in Raqqa, Syria in May 2015, and settled in a house on the city's edge.

While living under the Islamic State, Sally went by the name Umm Yusuf (English: "Mother of Yusuf"), derived from the new name given to her oldest son, but she never converted to Islam. Her husband was often away from the family, fighting for IS a month at a time. When he was home, he subjected Sally to increasing levels of physical abuse, which was later attested to by Sally's former neighbors. He also abused the children, and he continued to abuse drugs. Sally homeschooled her children, refusing her husband's request to place them in the IS-controlled school system. She soon became pregnant with their second child, and her third. When Sally realized she was pregnant, she made a plan with a neighbor to get smuggled with the children out of the Islamic State the next time Elhassani was away fighting.

Before Sally could implement her plan, in the spring of 2016, Islamic State authorities raided her home and arrested her and her husband. Sally was interrogated in her home by an IS woman, possibly Fatiha Mejjati. She was then taken by IS fighters to the "black stadium", a football stadium converted into a prison and torture facility by the IS. She was held in solitary confinement, interrogated by male IS members, accused of being a spy, starved and tortured for about two and a half months. She was raped repeatedly by one of her interrogators. In June 2016, the black stadium was bombed, which caused the ceiling of Sally's cell to collapse, and she was able to escape from it and found Elhassani. They hid in one of the stadium's tunnels until the bombing ended, and then the guards took them to separate holding cells. Not long after the bombing, Sally and Elhassani were brought before a judge who ordered their release. Shortly afterward, she gave birth to her third child, a son.

While living in Raqqa, in the summer of 2016, the family purchased two enslaved Yazidi girls, who were 17 and 14 years old respectively at the time. Sally has maintained that she attempted to keep the girls safe, but that her husband did rape the two of them repeatedly. The 17-year-old has also maintained that Sally treated her well and tried to protect her from Elhassani. The family also purchased a Yazidi boy, close in age to Sally's oldest son, to be his companion. That same year, Sally gave birth to another child, a girl.

In August 2017, the Islamic State released a propaganda video featuring Sally's son threatening then-president of the U.S., Donald Trump. The video also featured the Yazidi boy the family owned; he claimed to have been "liberated" by the Islamic State at Sinjar. Elhassani was killed in a drone strike on September 6, 2017. Sally said his death "felt like the noose had been taken off my neck". She, her children, and the three enslaved Yazidis moved in with Elhassani's brother, Abdelhadi, who was living in the center of Raqqa. The group then moved to the city of Deir ez-Zor in October 2017, after being allowed to leave Raqqa.

=== Escape ===
While living in Deir ez-Zor in late 2017, Sally learned of a nearby people smuggler through one of the enslaved Yazidi teenagers. Sally paid the man in over ten ounces of gold, and escaped with her four children and the family's three enslaved Yazidis while her brother-in-law, Abdelhadi Elhassani, was out of the house. The smuggler drove the eight into Kurdish-held territory.

Samantha Sally and her four children were taken into the custody of the American-allied Kurdish militias YPG/YPJ on November 18, 2017; the three Yazidis they had enslaved were returned to Iraq to reunite with their families. Sally and her children were first taken to the Kurdish base of Hassakeh and then to the Al-Roj refugee camp. The family lived at the camp until July 2018. During that time, Sally also helped care for two young Trinidadian boys who had been brought to the Islamic State by their father.

On July 24, 2018, Sally and her children were flown back to the United States, where Sally was arrested. Sally's children were taken into state care. Her oldest son was put in the custody of his father, and her other three children were in foster care until 2020, after which time her parents took custody of them. In 2021, Sally's parental rights were terminated. In 2022, her parents legally adopted her children.

== Criminal charges ==
Upon her return to the U.S., Sally was initially charged with making false statements to an FBI officer. This was in connection to the story she'd told her FBI handler about going to Morocco for surgery. A month after her return to the US, the additional charge of "providing material support for terrorism" was added. She could have faced up to 45 years in prison. A doctor hired by her defense team diagnosed her with post-traumatic stress disorder and major depressive disorder. In November 2019, Sally pleaded guilty to the reduced charge of "concealment of terrorism financing", which had a maximum sentence of ten years.

On November 9, 2020, Sally was sentenced to six and a half years in prison. The judge cited her history as a victim of domestic violence, torture and rape as mitigating factors. She served her sentence at the Federal Medical Center, Carswell, in Texas, a prison for women with complex medical and mental health needs.

== In media ==
Sally's story was covered in the BBC Sounds podcast I'm Not A Monster and in the 2020 Frontline and Panorama documentary Return from ISIS.

In 2024, Jessica Roy published a book on the lives of Samantha Sally and her sister Lori, titled American Girls: One Woman's Journey Into the Islamic State and Her Sister's Fight to Bring Her Home.

== See also ==
- Taha al-Jumailly
- Shamima Begum
- Ariel Bradley
- Lina Ishaq
- Islam Mitat
- Hoda Muthana
- Gailon Su and Su-lay Su
