= Tania Joya =

American-British counter-extremist activist (born 1983)

- Born: Tania Choudhury; 1983 (age 42–43); Harrow, London
- Citizenship: British, American
- Known for: Counter-extremism advocacy

Tania Joya (born 1983) is a British-American former jihadi and current counter-extremism activist. In 2013, she fled Syria after traveling there with husband John Georgelas to join the Islamic State. In 2022, she asserted that she had an extramarital romantic relationship with US Representative Van Taylor, who subsequently acknowledged having a relationship and dropped out of a Texas runoff election.

== Early life ==
Joya was born as Joya Choudhury in Harrow, north London, UK in 1983 to a "culturally Muslim" Bangladeshi family. Her father worked for an airline while her mother ran a catering business. She claimed to experience racism while growing up in London, being called a Paki. When she was around seven years old, her father was laid off and started working odd jobs. She struggled with dyslexia. Her mother started fostering children. She became a "jihadi hardcore" soon after the September 11 attacks, associating with a group of fundamentalist Muslims from Algeria.

== Adult life ==
In 2003, at an anti-war protest in London she was given a piece of paper with a link to a Muslim-dating website, she went on the website and met John Georgelas, a Greek-American who had recently converted to Islam shortly after the September 11 attacks. She moved to the USA after marrying Georgelas in Rochdale on his first trip to London in 2004. The couple shared a passion for jihad and dreamed of training their children to be jihadis.

In 2006, Georgelas was sentenced to three years in prison for hacking a pro-Israeli lobby group.

In 2013, the couple moved to Egypt from where Georgelas tricked Joya into travel to Azaz, Aleppo, Syria and where Georgelas joined the Islamic State. After two weeks, she fled Syria, and sought US permission to return to the US, via Turkey. In the US, she cooperated with authorities and stayed with her parents-in-law in Plano, Texas. She has renounced Islam, and as of November 2017 attended a Unitarian Universalist church.

In June 2018, Joya divorced Georgelas and remarried. She found her second husband to be "controlling" and did not want to move to Colorado with him, so she divorced him.

In March 2022, Joya was living in Plano, and was training to become a hypnotherapist.

== Advocacy ==
Joya has said she is committed to "reprogramming" extremists, and speaks at events in the US about countering extremism. She works with Faith Matters, a counter-extremism group in the UK, and the Clarion Project. In 2019, she urged the British public to show mercy to Shamima Begum.

== Van Taylor infidelity allegations ==
On February 27, 2022, two days before the primary election for Texas's 3rd congressional district, right-wing media outlet National File posted an interview with Joya in which she discussed having a nine-month sexual affair in 2020 and 2021 with Van Taylor, Republican US Representative serving the 3rd district, who was married to another woman and was facing several primary challengers. Saying she met Taylor at a jihadi reprogramming session, Joya shared salacious details about the affair, and said that Taylor gave her US$5,000 for her personal expenses. Her statements were repeated the next day by Breitbart News and circulated widely on social media. In a statement to The Dallas Morning News, Joya said she was "annoyed at having to see her ex-lover's face on billboards" and approached Taylor's Republican opponent Suzanne Harp, hoping that Harp would privately persuade Taylor to drop out of the race, but Taylor did not do so, prompting Joya to make her allegations public.

On March 1, Taylor won a plurality but not a majority of primary votes, triggering a May 24 runoff election. The next day, in an email to supporters, Taylor announced the suspension of his reelection campaign and admitted to an extramarital affair. On March 4, Taylor withdrew from the runoff, ceding it to runner-up Keith Self.

== In popular culture ==
The 2022 Discovery+ documentary A Radical Life presents the story of Joya and her ex-husband, John Georgelas (aka "Yahya al-Bahrumi").

== Family ==
She is the mother of four children. She was pregnant with her fourth child when she fled Syria.
