= Tomasa Pérez Molleja =

Spanish-born jihadist who joined ISIS with her children

- Born: 1976; Malaga, Spain
- Died: 2019 (aged 42–43); Baghuz, Syria
- Occupation: stay-at-home mother
- Known for: The last Spanish woman to join ISIL
- Spouse: Abdelah Ahram (1993-2019)
- Children: 6 (3 deceased: Yasin, Musa and Islam)

Tomasa Pérez Molleja (1976–2019) was a Spanish woman who traveled to Syria to join the Islamic State of Iraq and the Levant (ISIL) in 2014, taking her children with her. In 2022, her death was confirmed; she had died in Baghuz, where ISIL had their territorial last stand, in 2019. Three of her six Spanish-born children were also killed in Syria.

== Life before ISIL ==
Tomasa Pérez Molleja was born in Malaga to a Catholic family. She was raised in Córdoba and got excellent grades in school. At 16 or 17 years of age, she met Abdelah Ahram, a Moroccan a year older than herself. She was in her third year of high school and dropped out soon after meeting him, months before she would have taken university entrance exams. She converted to Islam, and shortly afterwards she and Ahram married, which gave him Spanish citizenship. She had their first child at age 19, in 1995, and another in 1996. She and Ahram would have six children altogether.

Her mother stated she would accompany her daughter to medical checkups during Pérez's first two pregnancies, and also supported her when she had a miscarriage. Pérez stopped contacting her parents after the birth of her second baby. They never heard from her again.

After their second child was born, the family moved to Alcolea. Later, they moved to Barcelona. The family's neighbors in the early 2000s said Pérez wore a hijab, and that the family did not socialize, although the children did attend school. Ahram worked nights, and Pérez was a stay-at-home mother. In 2003, the family moved to Sweden, but they were denied a residency permit, so moved to Morocco.

Authorities believe Pérez was radicalized by her husband. In 2006, Ahram was arrested with his two brothers for belonging to a terrorist group in Morocco. He was released in 2008, and he and his family went to Ceuta. In 2009, when Ahram went back to Morocco, he was convicted of another terrorism charge; court documents indicate he "encouraged suicide operations and the execution of hostages held by Al-Qaeda". He was sentenced to ten years in prison.

== ISIL ==
In 2014, from prison, Ahram urged Pérez to travel to Syria to join the ISIL caliphate. Ahram's two brothers were already there. Pérez sent her oldest sons, Muhammad Yasin Ahram Pérez and Musa Nosair Ahram Pérez, to Syria ahead of her, then followed with their younger siblings. Pérez and her younger four children arrived on December 4, 2014. She was the last confirmed woman to leave Spain to join the Syrian jihad.

Pérez published a letter online defending her decision to go to live under ISIL. She said she had cut up and burned her own and her children’s Spanish passports and that “my children are being raised according to the teachings of the Prophet and the Quran. Don't feel sorry for them; when your sons die of overdoses and your daughters are raped after snorting cocaine, they are the ones who truly deserve pity."

In Syria, Yasin took the nom de guerre Abu Lais Al Qurdubi. He was wounded in the summer of 2016, required two surgeries and was in a wheelchair, then on crutches. He appeared on an ISIL propaganda video after the 2017 Barcelona attack, speaking in Spanish and saying, "Allah willing, Al Andalus will become once again what it was, part of the caliphate."

The Pérez children did not attend school in Syria. Instead, their mother taught them math and Arabic at home. Pérez reportedly recruited other women to ISIL.

Her third son, who was eight years old when he arrived in the ISIL territory, said in 2025 that his brother Musa was killed in 2016 while fighting Bashar al-Assad's troops in the Aleppo area. Their brother Yasin, he said, died in Baghuz at the age of 24, and their mother also died in Baghuz after being severely injured in a bombing. Pérez’s daughter Islam, who was about fifteen years old, was shot and killed when the remaining four children tried to escape Baghuz after burying their mother. After his sister’s death, Pérez’s third son, by then thirteen, was treated by Red Crescent for his own gunshot wounds, and he and his surviving younger two siblings were taken to the Al-Hawl refugee camp and given a tent to live in.

When interviewed by El País in 2025, her third son said he hadn’t heard from his younger brothers in two years and thought they were still in Al-Hawl. He said he wanted to return to Spain to live with his grandparents and work to support his brothers. He was later sent to the Houri Juvenile Deradicalization Center. As of 2026, the Houri center is closed. Al-Hawl, where the youngest two boys were, also closed in 2026 and all residents have left.

== See also ==
- Khaled Sharrouf
- Aqsa Mahmood
- Luna Fernández Grande
- Yolanda Martínez Cobos
