= Assassination of Ahmad Shah Massoud =

2001 murder in Takhar, Afghanistan

- ترور احمدشاه مسعود
- Part of War in Afghanistan
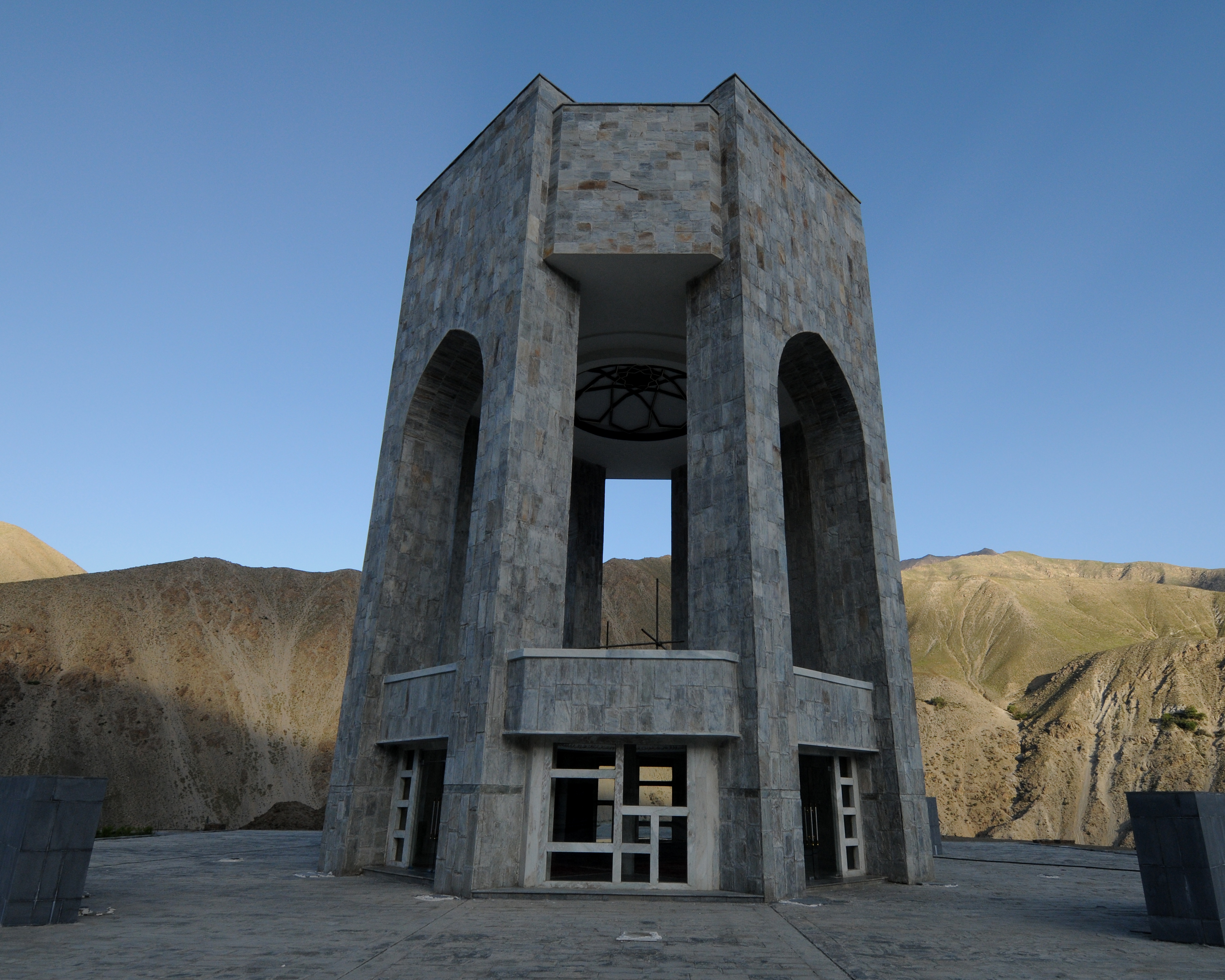
- Tomb of Ahmad Shah Massoud in 2011

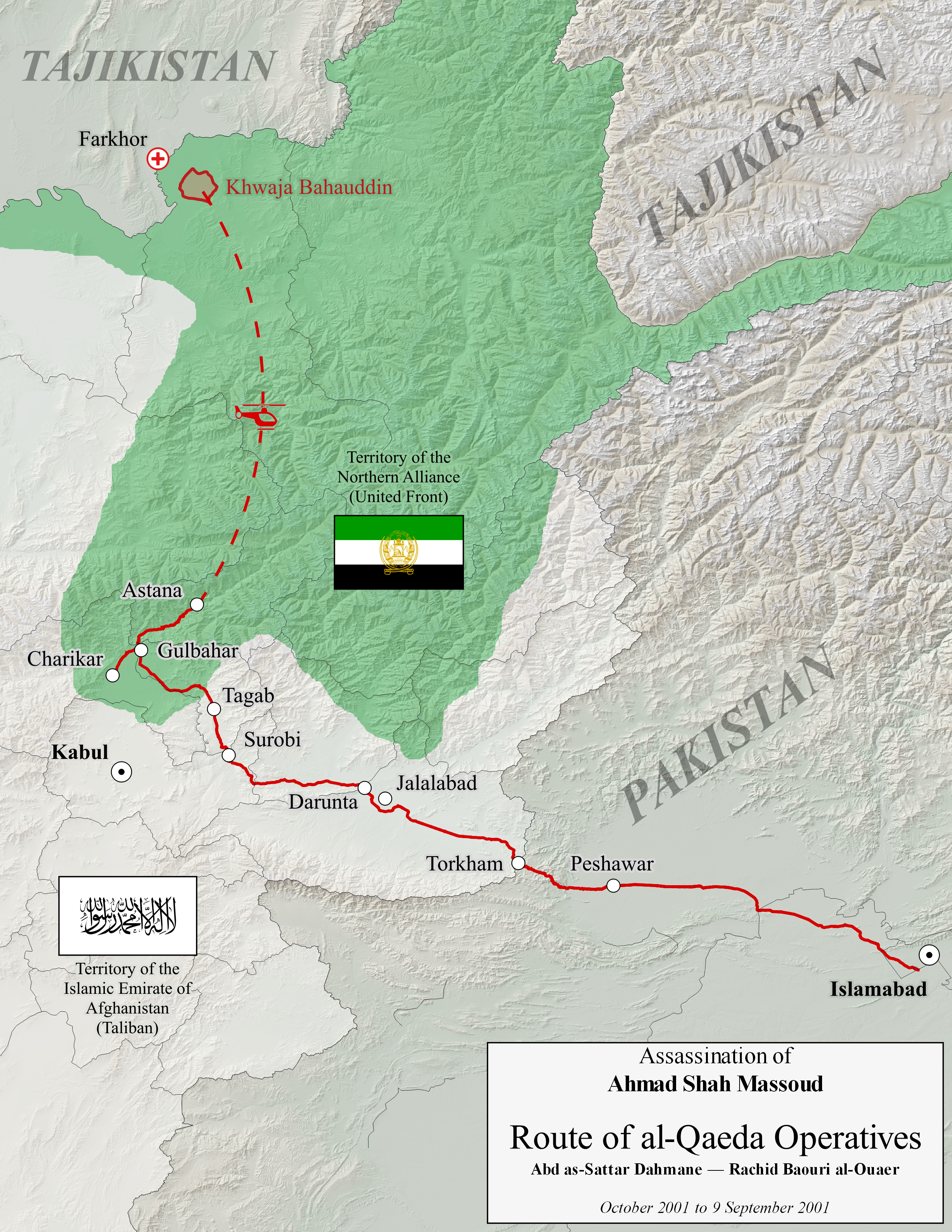
- Location: Guest house in Khwaja Bahauddin, Afghanistan
- Date: 9 September 2001; 25 years ago c. 11:45 am (UTC+4:30)
- Target: Ahmad Shah Massoud
- Attack type: Suicide bombing
- Weapon: Bomb concealed inside a television camera battery belt
- Deaths: 1 (+2 perpetrators)
- Injuries: 1
- Perpetrator: Al-Qaeda
- Assailants: Abd as-Sattar Dahmane; Rachid Bouari el-Ouaer

On 9 September 2001, Ahmad Shah Massoud was assassinated by two al-Qaeda operatives posing as journalists in Khwaja Bahauddin District, Takhar Province, Afghanistan.

Massoud, a pivotal guerilla fighter nicknamed the "Lion of Panjshir", had led insurgent forces against the governments of Daoud Khan, communist government under the People's Democratic Party of Afghanistan (PDPA), invading Soviet forces, and the late 1990s Taliban regime. At the time of his assassination, Massoud commanded the forces of the Northern Alliance, backed primarily by Iran and Tajikistan, fighting against Taliban forces, backed by Pakistan. Massoud remained a vocal critic of Pakistani interference in Afghanistan (through the Taliban) and Osama bin Laden's al-Qaeda in Afghanistan, including publicly warning U.S. president George W. Bush five months prior to 9/11 that the situation in Afghanistan, if unresolved, "will also affect the United States and a lot of other countries".

Shortly after a press conference in the European Parliament, in which Massoud denounced Pakistani interference, the Taliban, and al-Qaeda, Osama bin Laden called for volunteers to "deal with Ahmad [Shah] Massoud". From their training camp in Taliban-controlled Afghanistan, al-Qaeda's Ayman al-Zawahiri and Abu Hani al-Masri planned and prepared the operation. Two Tunisian Arab attackers in Europe, Abd as-Sattar Dahmane and Rachid Bouari el-Ouaer, were brought to Afghanistan where they were provided a stolen television camera and battery belt, packed with explosives. With an interview fraudulently arranged by Zawahiri and al-Masri, the two assassins were escorted by Taliban to the Panjshir Valley, flying by helicopter to join Massoud at his rear headquarters in Khwaja Bahauddin District. After weeks of failed attempts, Massoud agreed to sit with the Arabs and conduct the interview. After peppering Massoud with questions about his condemnation of bin Laden, al-Ouaer detonated his bomb, mortally wounding Massoud. Despite a timely medical evacuation by helicopter to a military clinic in Tajikistan, Massoud was pronounced dead on arrival.

The timing of Ahmad Shah Massoud's assassination has drawn significant attention, taking place only two days before the September 11 attacks in the United States. Though the attackers lacked any control over the exact date, waiting weeks for Massoud to make time for the purported interview, many still debate whether Osama bin Laden and Ayman al-Zawahiri had planned Massoud's assassination with the intention of disabling the Northern Alliance before 9/11, after which the United States would join them in a campaign to topple the Taliban regime. A partially-declassified U.S. intelligence report in November 2001 revealed that Massoud's intelligence apparatus had "gained limited knowledge regarding the intentions of [Osama bin Laden] and his terrorist organization al-Qaida to perform a terrorist attack against the U.S. on a scale larger than the 1998 bombing of U.S. embassies in Kenya and Tanzania."

Though al-Qaeda claimed responsibility for the attack, debates continue over allegations of Pakistani Inter-Services Intelligence (ISI) covert support to, or complicity in, the assassination of Ahmad Shah Massoud.

== Background ==
=== 1973 Afghan coup d'état ===
In July 1973, the last and longest-serving king of Afghanistan, Mohammad Zahir Shah, was deposed in a bloodless coup led by his cousin and prime minister, Mohammad Daoud Khan. With Zahir Shah exiled in Italy, Daoud Khan declared the end of Kingdom of Afghanistan, replaced by the Republic of Afghanistan, and announced that he would lead the country as president. Daoud, with a focus on Afghan nationalism, attempted the herculean tasks of administering the fiercely-independent Pashtun tribal areas, reuniting the two factions (Khalqis and Parchamists) of the Afghan communist party (PDPA), and reducing Soviet influence in Afghanistan in pursuit of Non-Aligned Movement ideals.

=== 1978 Afghan coup d'état ===
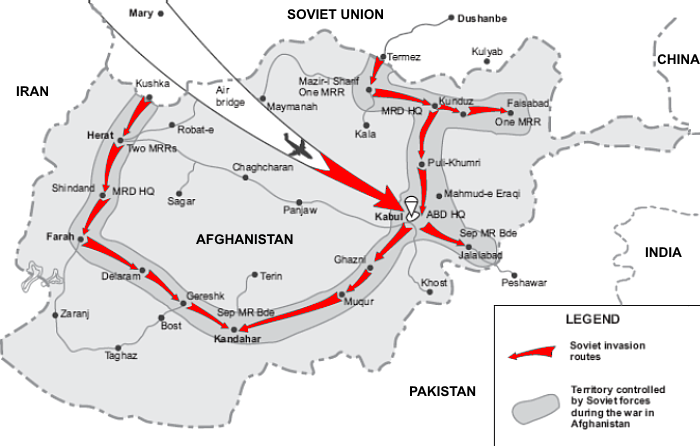
Map of the Soviet invasion, December 1979

In April 1978, Daoud was replaced in a coup by left-wing (communist) military officers of the Khalq communist faction, led by Nur Mohammad Taraki (Note: Despite speculation, the U.S. believed Soviet support to Taraki's coup to have been unlikely given Soviet favor to Daoud's non-aligned policies. Soviet leaders were only informed of the coup from Reuters reporting.). The new but unpopular communist government, in contravention of Daoud's non-aligned policy, quickly sought a close relationship and support from the Soviet Union. Taraki's communist policies, to include substantial land reform, bloody purges of opposition by the secret police, and extreme social reform, ignited a fierce insurgency by socially and Islamically conservative anti-communists. Alongside an internal civil war between the Khalq and Parcham factions of the communist government. Both urban and tribal groups fighting against Taraki's government, united on shared Islamic values and envisaged a religious struggle (jihad) against the atheist Marxist–Leninist government, collectively known as the mujahideen (مُجَاهِدِين, lit. 'those who conduct jihad').

=== Soviet-Afghan War ===
Threatened by the insurgency, in December 1978, Taraki and Deputy Prime Minister Hafizullah Amin signed a friendship treaty with Moscow to secure a promise of Soviet military intervention should the government fear toppling. In mid-1979, with the mujahideen uprising only growing, the Soviet Union sent a limited contingent troops to Bagram Air Base, north of the capital Kabul, also prompting the CIA to begin non-lethal support to the mujahedeen movement. With the situation rapidly deteriorating and supporters of Amin executing Taraki (enraging Moscow), the Soviet Union invaded Afghanistan in a last-ditch effort to save the faltering fledgling communist government.

To counter the Soviet's December 1979 invasion of Afghanistan, often described as a reversal of the Soviet arming of the Viet Cong in the American war in Vietnam, the United States initiated Operation Cyclone (depicted in the book and film Charlie Wilson's War), which armed the mujahideen movement against the Soviet Union and its communist government in Afghanistan.

In the late 1980s, having failed to suppress the mujahideen insurgency, amounting staggering casualties, lacking territorial control outside urban areas and the ring road, and with the ultimate collapse of the Soviet Union only two years away, the Soviets withdrew in a substantial political defeat.

=== Afghan Civil War ===
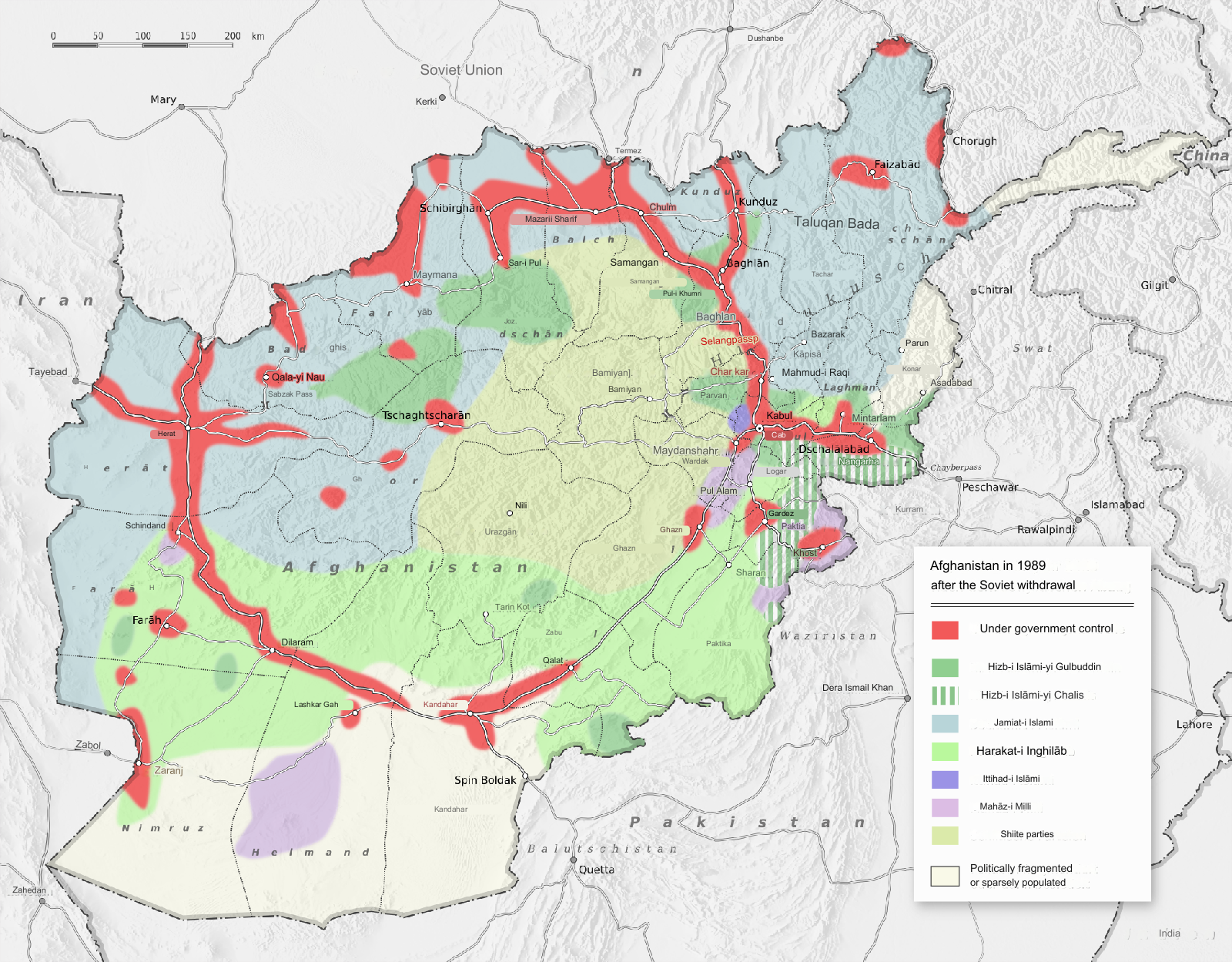
Afghanistan after the Soviet retreat

Following the December 1989 withdrawal of Soviet forces from Afghanistan, the Afghan mujahideen continued their campaign against the communist PDPA government until its collapse in 1992. The power vacuum created by the fall of the PDPA government transitioned Afghanistan into a second civil war between insurgent factions, largest among these being the Tajik-Pashtun Jamiat-e Islami led by Berhanuddin Rabbani and Hezb-e-Islami (Gulbuddin) led by Gulbuddin Hekmatyar. These warlord-led insurgent factions ruthlessly shelled Afghan urban areas, none more than Kabul.

Having fought against Daoud Khan's government, Taraki's communist government, Soviet forces in Afghanistan, and the remaining communist government from his base in the Panjshir Valley, Ahmad Shah Massoud joined Rabbani's Jamiat-e Islami as his military commander where he earned the title "Lion of the Panjshir".

During both the Soviet-Afghan War and CIA-led Operation Cyclone, Pakistan's military and its intelligence service, Inter-Services Intelligence (ISI), played the most outsized role in supporting political Islamist mujahideen groups. The Pakistani government, namely under the dictatorship of Muhammad Zia-ul-Haq, sought to create a Pashtun-dominated Islamist government in neighboring Afghanistan that would anchor its foreign policy to the Islamic and Pashtun-friendly Pakistani establishment. Despite more than a decade of support as ISI's most-favored group to assume power in Kabul, Hezb-e Islami (Gulbuddin) failed each attempt to take control of Kabul and bled popular support under its persistent and bloody shelling of the city.

=== Taliban conquest ===
Losing confidence in Gulbuddin's group, and committed to opening Afghanistan's Central Asian land trade routes (once part of the Silk Road) the ISI turned to the infant but promising Taliban movement. Pashtun, conservative, Deobandi, and Islamist, the Taliban movement in Kandahar appealed greatly to the Pakistani ISI after demonstrating it could seize the Spin Boldak border crossing from a variety of mujahideen who had set up informal chain tolls along Afghan roads. As the route for Pakistani trucking opened, support from the ISI increased and replaced Gulbuddin's faction as Pakistan's most favored group to take power in Afghanistan. After Spin Boldak, the Taliban captured Kandahar Airport, Kandahar City in November 1994, and western Herat in 1995.

With the rising Taliban threat to Kabul, Rabbani and Massoud's Jamiat-e Islami united with other mujahideen groups in Kabul and the north to form the United Islamic Front for Salvation of Afghanistan, better known as the United Front or (in the West) the Northern Alliance. Despite a number of tactical successes against the Taliban, Massoud was forced to withdraw his forces north from Kabul into the Panjshir, ceding the capital city to the Taliban in 1996.

=== Northern Alliance resistance ===
Holding the northern portion of the country, principally the Panjshir Valley to the north of Kabul and Mazar-e-Sharif in the northwest, the Northern Alliance was recognized by its backers (India, Iran, Russia, Tajikistan, Turkmenistan, the United States, and Uzbekistan) as the lawful and representative, though displaced, government of Afghanistan with Rabbani as President and Massoud as Minister of Defense. Fighting against the de facto rulers of Afghanistan, the Pakistan-backed Taliban, Ahmad Shah Massoud continued to vocally denounce Pakistani involvement in Afghanistan.

Following the 1992 Aden hotel bombings, 1993 World Trade Center bombing (Note: The attack's mastermind, Ramzi Yousef, trained in al-Qaeda camps in Afghanistan), 1995 car bombing of American troops in Riyadh, 1998 bombings of U.S. embassies in Nairobi and Dar es Salaam, and October 2000 bombing of the USS Cole in Yemen, a number of governments became especially concerned with the Taliban's post-1996 hosting of Osama bin Laden and his al-Qaeda training camps. After the East African embassy bombings, the United States conducted Operation Infinite Reach, bombing al-Qaeda targets in Sudan (where bin Laden had stayed prior to 1996) and Afghanistan. In early 2001, prior to the September 11th attacks in America, the CIA, R&AW, IRGC, and SCNS routinely met with Ahmad Shah Massoud in Afghanistan to coordinate support to the Northern Alliance against the Taliban and al-Qaeda.

== Speech in Strasbourg ==
External video
- Massoud's 2001 Address in Strasbourg

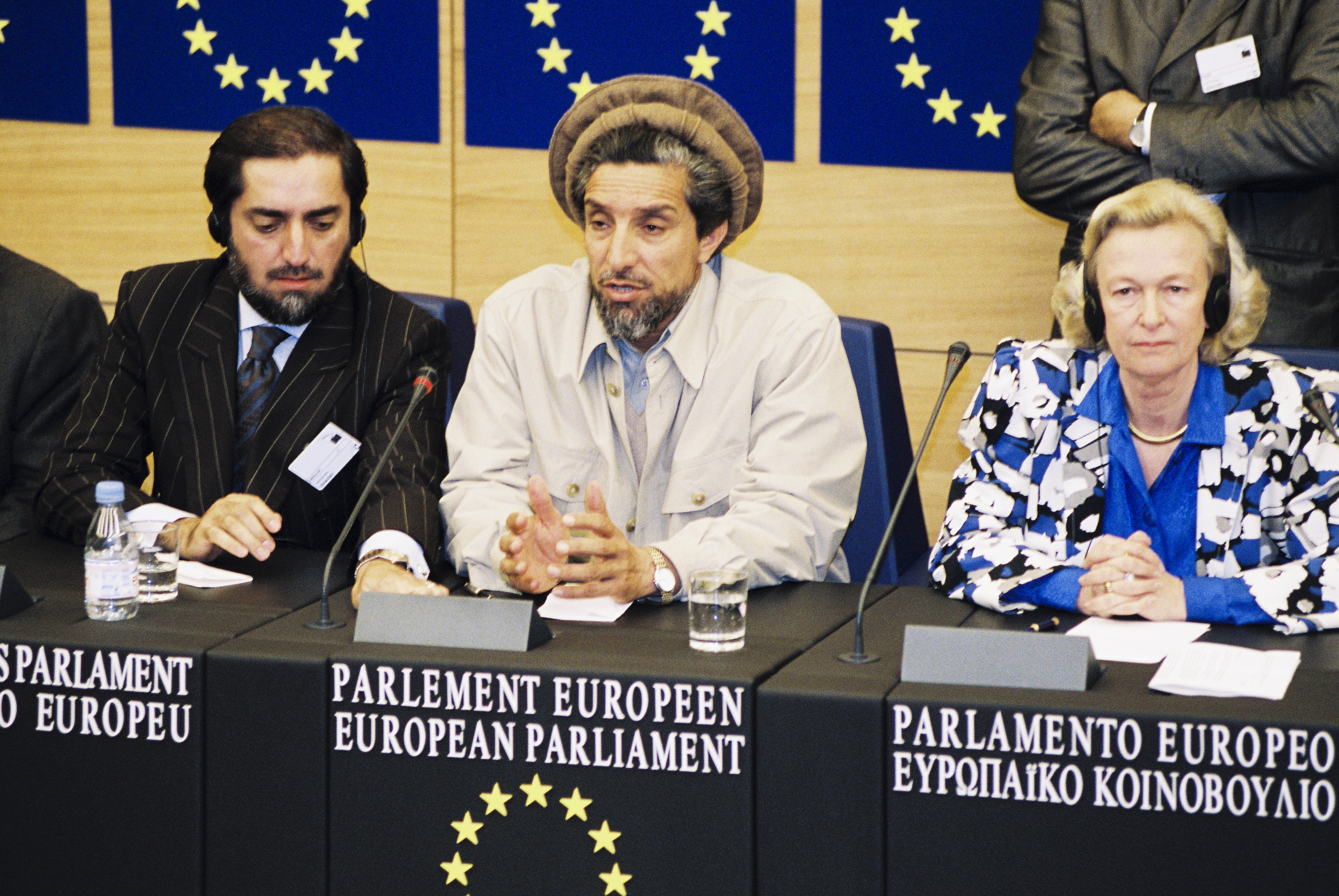
Massoud (centre) giving a press conference at the European Parliament on 5 April 2001

On 2 April 2001, President of the European Parliament Nicole Fontaine announced that she had invited Ahmad Shah Massoud, describing him as the "Vice-President of the Islamic State of Afghanistan", to Strasbourg, France to discuss human rights under the Taliban including the disenfranchisement of and violence against women and their destruction of the revered Bamiyan Buddhas, which had occurred one month prior. The 5 April 2001 visit, Massoud's first to Europe, comprised a meeting with Fontaine, Presidents of the French Senate (Christian Poncelete) and National Assembly (Raymond Forni), and later a press conference in the European Parliament during which he received a standing ovation. Fontaine's invitation was not without opposition within the French government, the strongest of which came from the French Foreign Minister, Hubert Védrine, who had thrice met with Taliban ministers, and eventually agreed to a short breakfast meeting with Massoud before the latter's press conference.

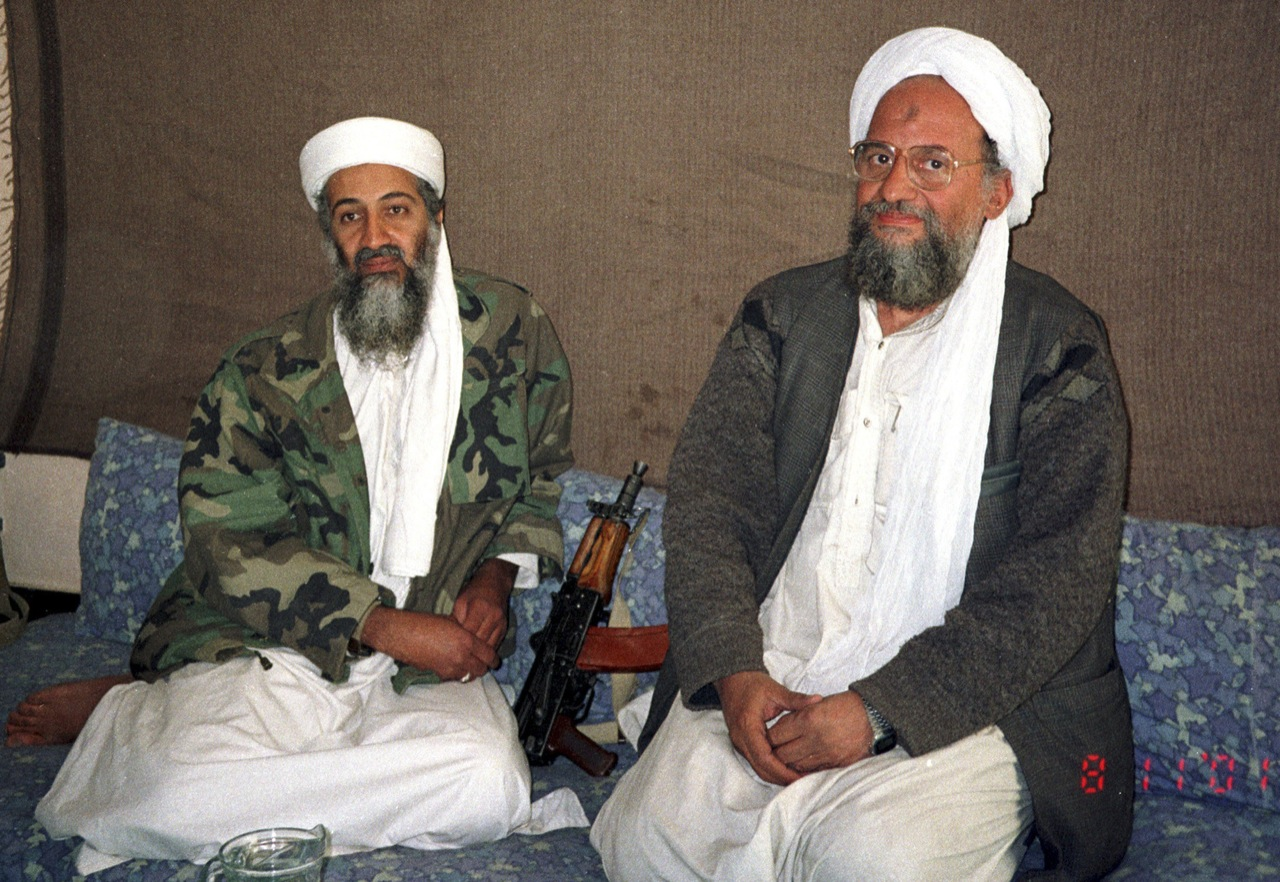
Osama bin Laden and Ayman al-Zawahiri

Speaking at the press conference, Massoud advocated for humanitarian aid to Afghans and calls for democratic elections, but extensively discussed the foreign backers of the Taliban to include Saudi Arabia, but primarily Pakistan's Inter-Services Intelligence (ISI), warning of the dangers of growing Islamic extremism in Afghanistan. Massoud detailed the sweeping military, political, and economic support the Pakistani ISI provided various Islamic fundamentalist groups in Afghanistan after the Soviet withdrawal to include both the Taliban, and since 1996, Osama bin Laden and al-Qaeda foreign fighters in Afghanistan. Citing bin Laden specifically, Massoud warned that he posed a threat to Afghanistan and the larger world, specifically the United States, often termed 'prophetic' following the September 11 attacks months later.

Behind the whole situation in Afghanistan, and all those extremist groups, there is the regime in Pakistan, and especially the military part of the regime and its intelligence service, which is supporting all these extremist groups... My message to President [George W.] Bush is the following: If peace is not re-established in Afghanistan, if he doesn't help the Afghan people, it is certain that the problem of Afghanistan will also affect the United States and a lot of other countries... Their objectives are not limited to Afghanistan. They consider Afghanistan as the first phase to a long-term objective in the region and beyond.

— Ahmad Shah Massoud, European Parliament Press Conference (April 2001)

Later reflecting on her decision to invite Ahmad Shah Massoud, Fontaine wrote "As head of the largest democratic parliament in the world, which represents 380 million citizens, I feel completely in solidarity with the resistance against the most hateful fanaticism... We expected a warlord. What we saw was someone who was seeking a political solution, as a true architect of peace. I will never forget that day."

=== Bin Laden's response ===
Rebuking Massoud's public criticism, Osama bin Laden asked his followers "Who will take it upon himself to deal with Ahmad [Shah] Massoud for me, because he harmed Allah and his sons?" according to Abu Jandal, a later-disillusioned personal bodyguard to bin Laden who was told "a few brothers volunteered to assassinate Massoud and be rewarded by Allah."

== Attack preparations ==
=== Assassins ===
The operation's two attackers were Tunisian Arabs: 39-year-old Abd as-Sattar (var. Abdessattar) Dahmane (عبد الستّار دحمان; lit. 'servant-of-the-Veiler (Note: The 'Veiler' is an Islamic reference to God (Allah), as one who mercifully veils the sins of man. Because it is not mentioned in the Quran or writings on Muhammad (sunnah), and is therefore insufficiently proven, it is not recognized among the ninety-nine official names of Allah.) Dahmane') under the alias Karim Touzani and 31-year-old Rachid Bouari el-Ouaer (راشد بوعري الوائر) under the alias Kacem Bakkali. For the operation, Dahmane was designated to be the leader of the two and to play the role of interviewer with el-Ouaer as camera operator.

Dahmane was born 27 August 1962 in the coastal city of Gabès, Tunisia's sixth-largest city. Dahmane grew up in the poor Tunisian town of Jendouba in the country's northwest until traveling to the capital city of Tunis to pursue a journalism degree. Dahmane's professors describe him as a quiet student and it was at the university where he fell in love with one of his peers, described by Massoud's biographer, Sandy Gall, as "a very pretty Tunisian girl with long brown hair." Dahmane and his lover moved to Belgium on a residence permit and eloped there.

Dahmane attempted to graduate from three universities, including the prestigious French-speaking UCLouvain, but failed to graduate from any of the three. With little prospect for completing his education or finding stable work, Dahmane was close to bottoming-out and losing his Belgian residency, making him a ripe candidate for recruitment by al-Qaeda in the mid-to-late 1990s. It was then that Tarek Maaroufi, a Tunisian Islamic extremist whose Europe-based group was later responsible for the 2000 Strasbourg Cathedral bombing plot, suggested to Dahmane the prospects of jihad in Afghanistan. Further, the Syrian jihadist Sheikh Bassam Ayachi, head of the Centre Islamique Belge in Molenbeek-Saint-Jean which Dahmane frequented, introduced Dahmane to the Moroccan-born Malika el-Aroud (later infamous as one of Europe's most prominent online jihadists) and officiated their wedding after three months. Without money and without a job, Dahmane Dahmane quickly became conservative in his faith: growing out his beard, discarding his Western clothes, declining to shake women's hands, abandoning alcohol and in one instance walking out on a family dinner upon discovering that his brother was a Shia Muslim.

Little is known of Bouari el-Ouaer, described only as "bigger, stronger, and [looking] like a boxer."

=== Obtaining the camcorder ===
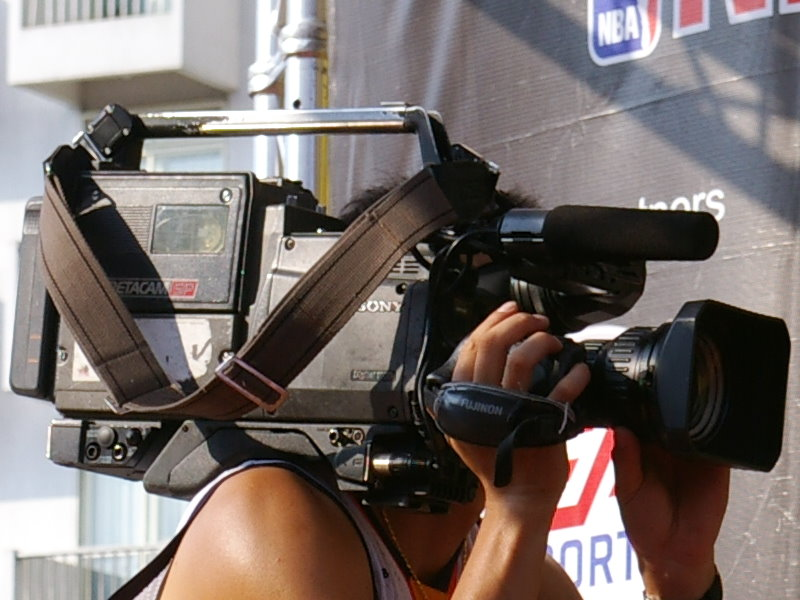
Sony Betacam Camcorder

On 24 December 2000, Jean-Pierre Vincendet had been filming Christmas Eve decorations on store windows in the southeastern French city of Grenoble for TF1 when, "faced with five threatening individuals", he had his Sony Betacam BVW-200 AP camcorder stolen. Vincendet followed the individuals to note their getaway car's registration number before reporting the theft and vehicle to police.

According to Waheed Muzda, the stolen camcorder, along with a load of office supplies, were picked up in Quetta, Pakistan and driven across the Spin Boldak–Chaman border crossing to al-Qaeda's cultural office in Kandahar, Afghanistan. Muzda, who had worked for the post-1996 Islamic Emirate's (Taliban) Foreign Ministry and frequently attended meetings between the Taliban government and Osama bin Laden, told Fiona Gall (Note: Fiona Gall is a consultant and wife of Massoud biographer, Sandy Gall.) in an interview that Abu Hani al-Masri and the two journalist had carefully unpacked the camcorder with Osama bin Laden, Ayman al-Zawahiri, Abu Hafs Kabir, Saif al-Adl, and Mahfouz Ould al-Walid. Later in a Facebook post, Muzhda would explain that he could not understand either the seeming importance of the two journalists or why they were so careful in unpacking the camcorder until after Massoud's assassination.

Though French police closed the theft case in May 2001 without result, Vincendet eventually received a call from the Federal Bureau of Investigation (FBI) sometime after Massoud's assassination, reportedly stating "We found your camera, but it's in pieces," having matched the destroyed camera's serial number to Vincendet's case. Vincendet later learned that the getaway car was not reported stolen, but was owned by a resident of a town in Roussillon who "disappeared". On September 10, 2021, the provincial French-language newspaper Le Dauphiné libéré published a podcast with Vincendet in which he recalled the night his camcorder was stolen and the period of depression after learning how his camcorder was used in the assassination.

=== Arranging the interview ===
In July 2001, approximately three months following Massoud's speech to the European Parliament, Ayman al-Zawahiri, the Egyptian cofounder of al-Qaeda and number two in the organization, wrote a fraudulent letter in faulty French to Massoud purporting to be from the Islamic Observation Centre in London, requesting two journalists to interview Massoud. In the same month, following up on the letter, Pashtun leader Abdul Rasul Sayyaf (eponym for Abu Sayyaf Group), a close associate of bin Laden from the Soviet-Afghan War who had later allied with Massoud's Northern Alliance, received an 'out-of-the-blue' phone call from Abu Hani al-Masri, a senior al-Qaeda shura council member and friend from the jihad against the Soviets. Abu Hani told Sayyaf that he was talking via satellite phone in Bosnia, where many Afghan Arab jihadists traveled after the Soviet withdrawal, and in two separate calls, asked for help arranging an interview for two Arab journalists with Massoud.

The telephone number from which Abu Hani al-Masri called Abdul Rasul Sayyaf was discovered written on a document carried by Bouari el-Ouaer, the purported cameraman in the assassination operation. With it, American intelligence officials traced the call to reveal that Abu Hani had not called from Bosnia, as he told Sayyaf, but from Kandahar, where al-Qaeda planned both the September 11th attacks and Massoud's assassination. Abu Hani had left his work fighting and propagandizing jihadism in Bosnia, Chechnya, Tajikistan, Uzbekistan, and Somalia (Note: Abu Hani was operating in Somalia in 1993 when eighteen American soldiers were killed in the Battle of Mogadishu.) to join Osama bin Laden when the latter returned to Afghanistan from Sudan in 1996. Following the September 11th attacks, Abu Hani al-Masri traveled to Malaysia where he was arrested in 2005 and extradited to his home country of Egypt. Abu Hani was imprisoned for six years under the Mubarak administration until, as officials from the new Afghan government arranged a trip to interview him in Egypt about the assassination, he was freed with thousands of other prisoners during the Arab Spring. Abu Hani fled to Syria to join Ahrar ash-Sham as a senior commander, allied with al-Qaeda's Syria branch, until his death in a February 2017 U.S. drone strike in Idlib Governorate.

== Assassins' travel ==
=== Darunta training camp ===
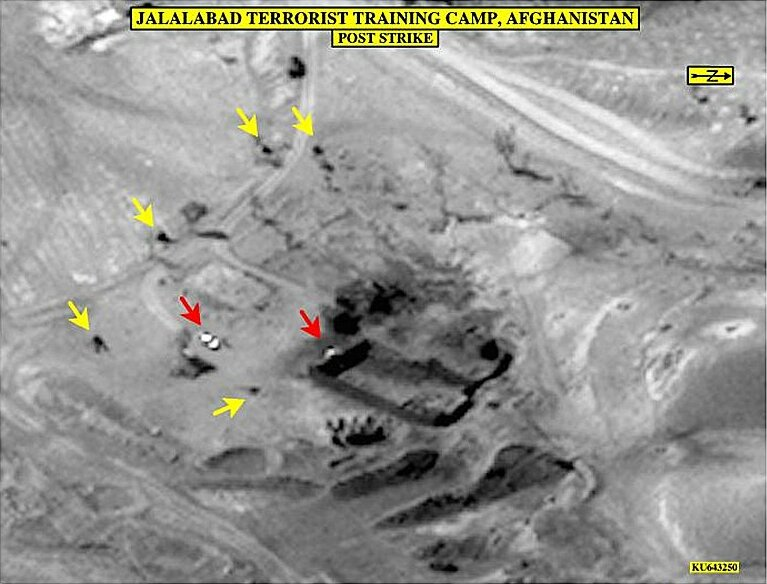
U.S. intelligence product on Darunta

Dahmane, at a low point, was recommended by a Tunisian friend and later founder of the Tunisian Combatant Group, Tarek Maaroufi, to travel to Afghanistan for jihad. With encouragement from his similarly-radicalized wife, Malika al-Aroud, Dahmane explained that he would travel first, and that she was to join him later. Another Tunisian Belgian, Adel Tebourski, who performed logistics for al-Qaeda, provided Dahmane and his wife with the necessary finances and travel tickets. Provided with Belgian passports stolen from the Belgian consulate in Strasbourg and the Belgian embassy in The Hague, Dahmane and fellow-operative Bouari el-Ouaer collected one-year, multiple-entry Pakistani visas supposedly issued by the Pakistani High Commission in London. Days later, the two boarded a flight at London Heathrow, landing at Islamabad International Airport, and drove through the Khyber Pass and Torkham border crossing into Afghanistan's Nangarhar Province. The two settled at al-Qaeda's Darunta training camp, only a few miles outside the provincial capital of Jalalabad, where al-Qaeda recruits trained with weapons, explosives, and conducted physical fitness training.

Malika al-Aroud joined Dahmane at Darunta in January 2001 where the two were provided a house by al-Qaeda. In August 2001, the month prior to the assassination, Dahmane explained to his wife that he would be leaving soon and that he had been given a camera and was being dispatched as a journalist to report from within Massoud's camp, adding "Perhaps I will not return from the front."

=== Panjshir Valley ===
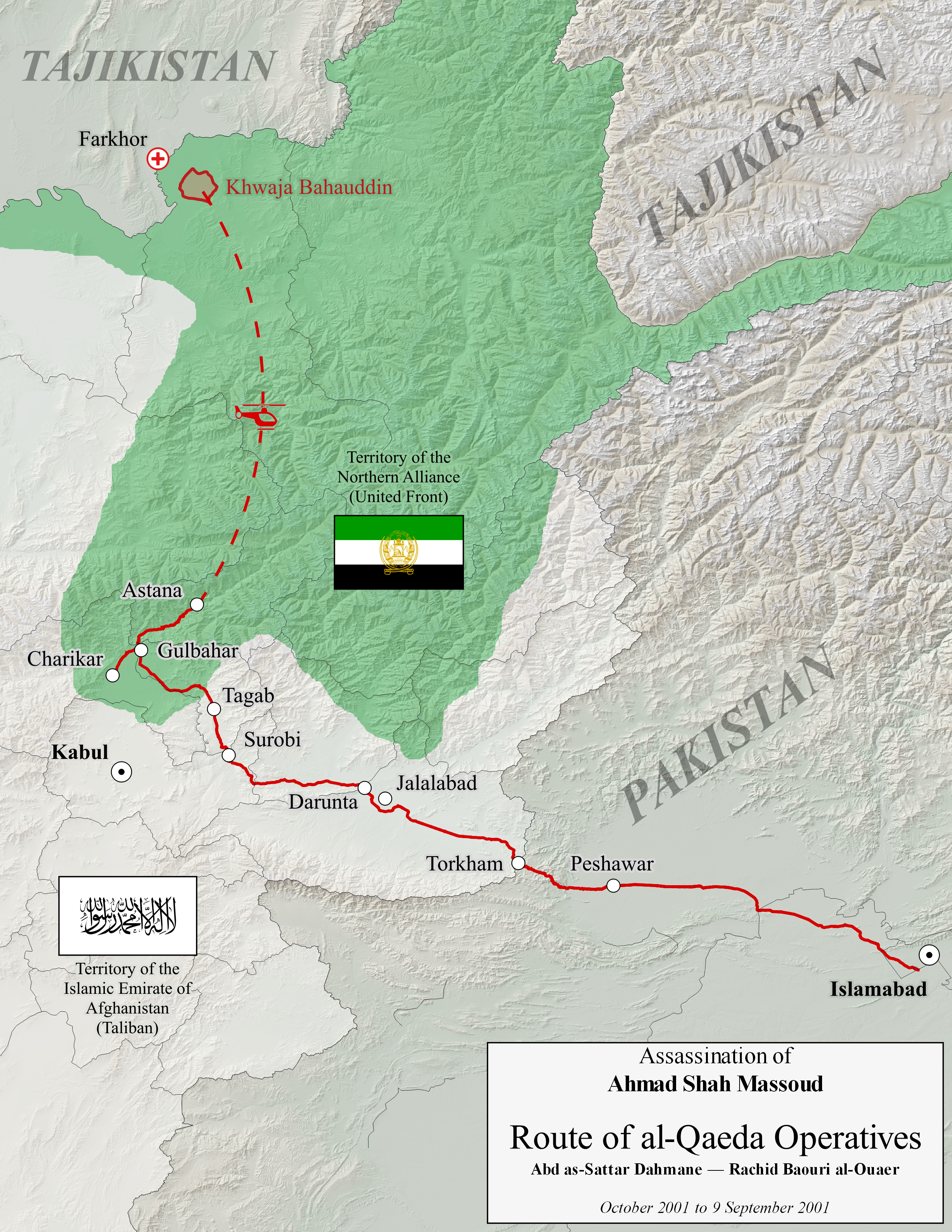

Dahmane and al-Ouaer departed the Darunta training camp on 12 August 2001, driving northwest through Taliban-controlled Afghanistan to the Northern Alliance-held Panjshir Valley. Following an alternate route from Surobi along the Tagab Valley, the Arabs reached Gulbahar, an entrance to the Panjshir Valley, where their Taliban escort departed and the two were received by Panjshiri mujahideen. With the interview already approved by Massoud following Zawahiri's forged letter, the Northern Alliance commander responsible for that region, Bismillah Khan, had ordered a car prepared for the Arabs. From the initial checkpoint they were driven to a second checkpoint and brought into Sayyaf's office. According to Amrullah Saleh, the Arabs reportedly instructed the Panjshiri driver to drive carefully to avoid damaging their equipment. Shortly after, the Arabs stayed with commander Bismillah Khan in Charikar, Parwan, who made arrangements for the two to tour the Northern Alliance's front lines in Panjshir.

Just over a week after the Arabs' arrival, they conducted interviews with the top leaders of the Northern Alliance, including Ahmad Shah Massoud, President Burhannudin Rabbani, Shia leader Sayed Mustafa Kazemi, and Pashtun leaders Haji Abdul Qadeer and Abdul Rasul Sayyaf, who had all gathered at Sayyaf's office for a meeting. According to Ahmad Jamshid, Massoud's personal secretary and cousin, "They [the Arabs] were always asking Sayyaf, 'We would like to interview Massoud, where is Massoud, when can we see him?'". The Arabs failed to meet with Massoud despite his attendance at the meeting.

Several days later, the Arabs were driving north up the Panjshir Valley where they were housed at a VIP guest house used for significant visitors, including at times CIA officials.

=== Helicopter to Takhar ===
With Massoud's return to his Khwaja Bahauddin headquarters in the northern province of Takhar, Dahmane overheard British traveling writer Matthew Leeming speaking over a satellite phone and later approached him to ask if he knew of Ahmad Shah Massoud. When Leeming responded in the affirmative, Dahmane asked "We are doing a television documentary about Afghanistan, and we need to get on a helicopter to Khwaja Bahauddin. Do you have General Massoud's [phone] number?", to which Leeming offered an explanation for why Massoud likely did not openly share his number.

At a high operational tempo, Massoud continued to fly back-and-forth between his northern (rear) headquarters in Khwaja Bahauddin, where he'd meet with CIA, RAW, Tajik officials, and other foreign backers, and the Panjshir Valley to meet with his operational commanders. Shortly before departing one of his stops in Panjshir, Massoud invited the Arabs to join him on the helicopter ride north to Takhar, but the Arabs were too slow arranging their luggage and missed the flight, a delay Amrullah Saleh believes was caused by attempts to set or modify the bomb.

Having missed Massoud's original helicopter flight north, the Arabs joined a second helicopter trip north two days after, along with French journalists to include Françoise Causse, who managed to take a photograph of Bouari el-Ouaer, who attempted to cover his face with his right hand. Causse later recounted how she, suspicious of the two, interrogated Dahmane in French, who told her he represented an information agency of the Arab world based "in London — but independent of governments and states." When asked "Who finances you?", Dahmane answered "I don't know. I am a simple journalist. I don't have access to this type of information. Those things are kept secret." Another passenger onboard the aircraft, French-Afghan university professor Shoukria Haider, recalled the Panjshiri security guards angrily searching the Arabs' bags and clothing twice, but found nothing.

External Image
- Photograph of al-Ouaer covering his face on the helicopter ride to Massoud

=== In Khwaja Bahauddin ===
The Arabs impatiently waited nine days in Khwaja Bahauddin, hoping for an interview opportunity. Awaiting Massoud's invitation, they stayed with The Christian Science Monitor correspondent Edward Girardet who recalled his own suspicion towards the Arabs, including asking the Northern Alliance's intelligence officer, Asim Suhail, who they were and where they said they came from. Suhail showed Girardet the letter forged by Zawahiri. Girardet later wrote that he had never heard of the organization and that the Arabs had tried for weeks to conduct their interview with Massoud. While waiting, the Arabs went out to purportedly shoot footage around Khwaja Bahauddin, but when asked by Girardet how the recording was going, always gave dejected and unenthusiastic responses.

== Assassination ==
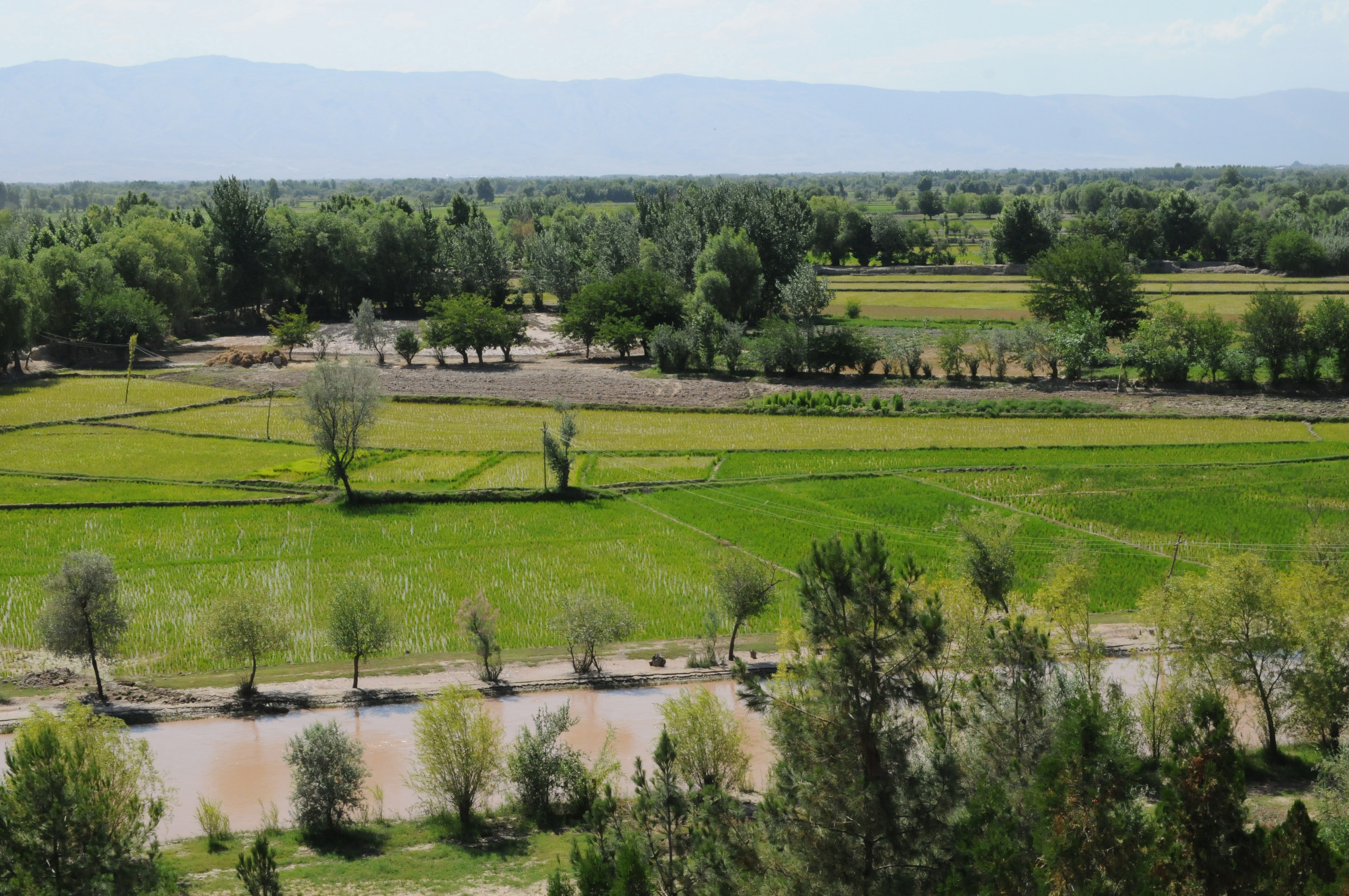
Khwaja Bahauddin in Takhar

Having stayed awake to read the poetry of the Persian poet Hafez until anywhere between 1:00 to 3:30 am (AFT) with his close friend Masoud Khalili, Ahmad Shah Massoud awakened later in the morning of 9 September 2001. Receiving reports the night before that Taliban forces had launched a number of attacks against the Northern Alliance on the Shomali Plain, Massoud had issued orders to have his helicopter ready by morning to fly southward to Charikar, on the western ridge of the plain, so that he could meet with his commander, Bismallah Khan, and review the operational progress. After waking, however, new reports conveyed that Taliban operations had eased, prompting Massoud to call off his previous plans and instead drive to review forces in Khwaja Bahauddin District of Takhar Province.

On his way to Khwaja Bahauddin, Massoud passed the guest house in which Khalili and the two Arabs were staying. The house, approximately 9 × 7 meters in size, was previously the home of one of Massoud's commanders who had provided it to Massoud for meetings with important guests. The exact location of the building remains publicly unknown. Shifting plans once more, Massoud decided to stop and conduct the interview and sent his bodyguards back to the group's headquarters. Entering the house between 11:00 and 11:30 am, Massoud found his intelligence chief, Engineer Arif, briefing Khalili. Massoud instructed Khalili that they would conduct the interview with the Arabs and then drive north to the Amu Darya (Oxus) River, which delineates Afghanistan's northern border with Uzbekistan and Tajikistan.

=== Interview ===
Massoud sat in the upstairs room with Khalili, his protocol officer Engineer Asim, intelligence chief Engineer Arif, and personal secretary Jamshid sitting shoulder-to-shoulder on his right. Mohammad Fahim Dashty, a close associate and later spokesman of the post-2021 National Resistance Front under Massoud's son, was also present in the room with a small camera. The two Arabs entered the room and, after Massoud apologized for the delay, Abd as-Sattar Dahmane (playing the role of interviewer), from Francophone Tunisia asked "My English is not good, can you speak French?" Told no, Dahmane instead spoke in slow, broken English through Khalili, who translated for Massoud in Dari. Khalili asked Dahmane what newspaper he represented, to which Dahmane responded that he belonged to the Islamic Centre in London. Khalili warned Massoud "He is not a journalist," but Massoud encouraged him to continue.

Prior to filming the supposed interview, Massoud asked the journalists about the areas under Taliban control, to which Dahmane responded "They criticize you and you criticize them... We belong to the Islamic Centre and we want to find the problem [sic] of the Muslim people in the world." Massoud asked for the list of questions to be asked, was handed a sheet of paper by Dahmane, and read all fifteen questions, eight or nine of which were about Osama bin Laden. Khalili later recalled in his statement to Scotland Yard the following questions:

1. "If you take Kabul, what do you do with Osama?"
2. "If you capture Osama, what do you do?"
3. "Why did you say Osama was a bad Muslim in France?" referring to Massoud's speech to the European Parliament
4. "Why do you say there is a difference between moderate and fundamentalist Islam?"
5. "Why don't you consider him [Osama] a leader?"

Having quietly reviewed the questions, Massoud told Khalili in Dari that he was ready, and that the Arabs should begin filming. Khalili relayed the message in English and Bouari el-Ouaer (in the role of cameraman), "pulled the table away very harshly," prompting a laugh from Massoud. He set up the camera's tripod at its lowest level (approximately half a meter, or around 1.5 feet), in front of Massoud, which Khalili remembered as being far too close to properly film. Massoud, in likely his final words, instructed Khalili "Tell him to ask the question." Dahmane asked in English "What is the situation in Afghanistan?", and, as Khalili translated the first word to Massoud, Bouari el-Ouaer detonated the explosives-packed camera battery belt he wore.

== Immediate aftermath ==
The explosion tore the two Arab assassins apart and its shrapnel prompted severe blood loss across Ahmad Shah Massoud's front and torso. Though Massoud took the majority of the blast, Masood Khalili, sitting to Massoud's right, sustained serious injuries and shortly fell unconscious, losing functionality in one eye and one ear. Thinking the explosion part of a Taliban air raid, Massoud's guards rushed upstairs from the ground floor to find him on the ground bleeding. Massoud reportedly instructed the guards to find his friend and close advisor, Masoud Khalili, before attending to him. As Massoud's intelligence chief Engineer Arif and personal secretary Jamshid ran upstairs, they observed guards carrying Massoud, who was missing part of his right ring finger, downstairs to drive him via a Toyota Land Cruiser to the heliport for medical evacuation. Massoud and others wounded were loaded into the helicopter, fortunately having just landed and still fully operational, and flown northward across the border into Tajikistan to a field hospital in Farkhor.

Farkhor, a small Tajik border town with a population of 25,300, hosts Farkhor Air Base. Five years before Massoud's assassination, India's intelligence and covert action agency, the Research and Analysis Wing (R&AW), secretly negotiated with the Tajikistani government under President Emomali Rahmon and Foreign Minister Talbak Nazarov to use the air base (India's first abroad) for intelligence gathering, medical aid, and military resupply to Massoud's Northern Alliance. Massoud and others wounded in the assassination were taken to the secret, Indian military-operated field clinic for treatment, landing in the garden. There, an Indian doctor pronounced him dead on arrival, suggesting Massoud had died only minutes after the explosion.

== Concealing news of Massoud's death ==
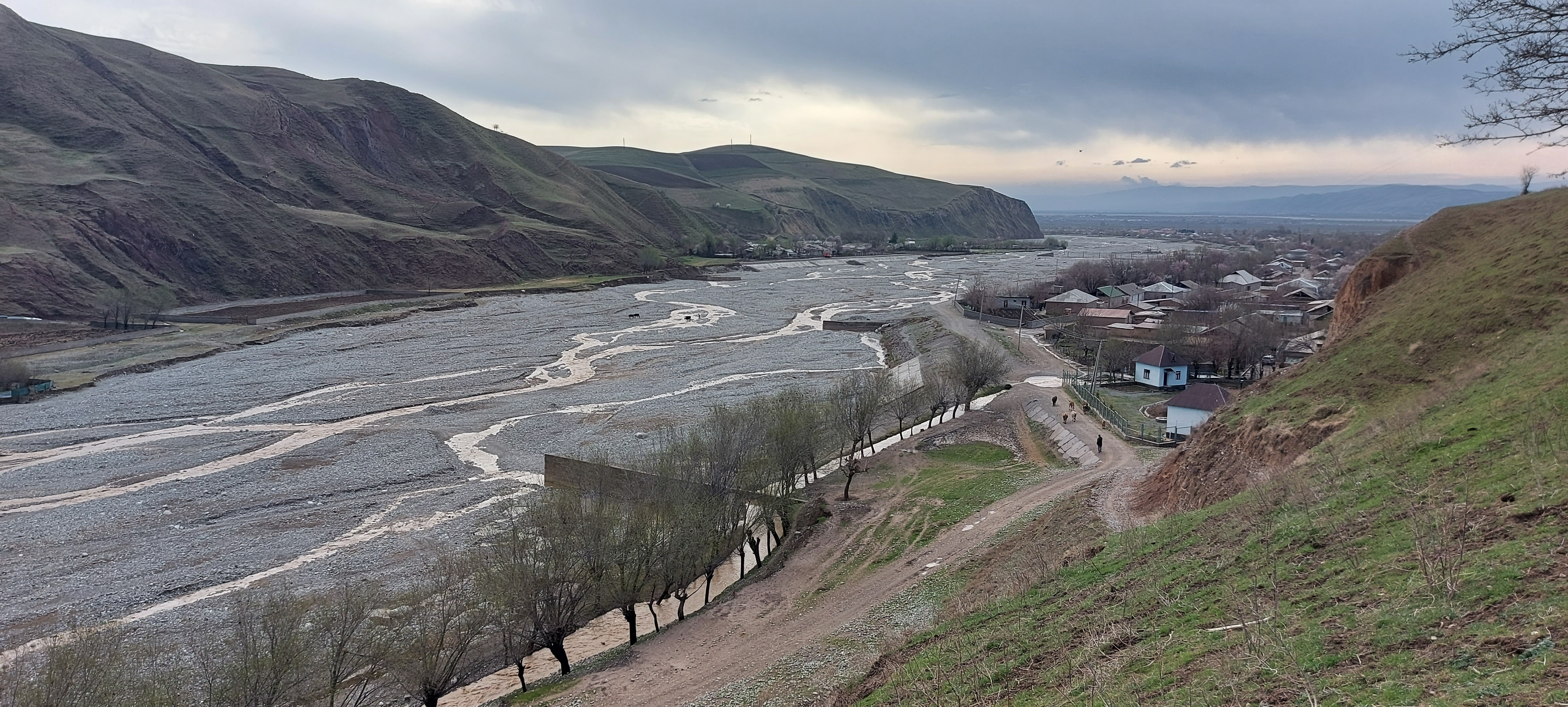
Kulob, Tajikistan

Massoud's body was moved north to Kulob as his colleagues quietly arranged for all those in Massoud's inner circle to rendezvous in Kulob and decide a way forward. Engineer Arif called General Fahim Khan, Massoud's top military commander, on a satellite phone stating "Something's happened to Khalid," using their codeword to describe Massoud, and instructions on how to get to the hospital in Kulob. Massoud's nephew also placed a call to Amrullah Saleh, providing him curt details to arrive at the hospital. Engineer Arif and other accompanying Panjshiri leaders decided that Massoud's death should, at least temporarily, be kept secret. They feared that if word got out to both the Taliban and Massoud's fighters in the Panjshir Valley, the Taliban would capitalize on Massoud's death and his Northern Alliance fighters would fall into a panicked retreat.

Amrullah Saleh appeared first in Kulob to join four to five of Massoud's commanders around his corpse. Shortly after top commander Fahim Khan arrived, followed by Engineer Arif, a member of Tajikistan's intelligence service, the State Committee for National Security (SCNS), followed by an officer of the Iranian Revolutionary Guards Corps (IRGC), and Abdullah Abdullah, a medical doctor and foreign policy advisor to Massoud recalled from a trip to New Delhi. Discussing how to keep secret news of Massoud's death, the IRGC officer present offered that the IRGC and SCNS could covertly fly Massoud's corpse to Mashhad, Iran to help "keep his death secret for one month, six months, whatever you need." Some suggested flying Massoud's body back to the Panjshir. Finally, SCNS officer suggested they could use a nearby morgue for a few days, upon which all agreed.

Massoud's colleagues called the displaced president of Afghanistan, Burhanuddin Rabbani, who was living in the northeastern province of Badakhshan, to break the news of Massoud's death. Rabbani quickly agreed with Massoud's colleagues to cover up Massoud's death, suggesting that he should be described as only slightly injured and in a hospital in Tajikistan. Rabbani also agreed to appoint General Fahim Khan to succeed Massoud as the military head of the Northern Alliance.

=== Informing international partners ===
With both crucial decisions made, for Fahim Khan to succeed Massoud, and for Massoud's death to be concealed, the group agreed to explain the truth of the situation to the six governments providing the most critical support to the Northern Alliance against the Taliban: the United States through the CIA, Russia through the FSB, Iran through the IRGC-QF and VEVAK, India through the RAW, Tajikistan through the SCNS, and Uzbekistan through the NSS (today, SSS).

Amrullah Saleh, was tasked with passing word to the CIA, calling Counterterrorist Center (CTC)'s chief, Rich Blee, on an encrypted line. Saleh provided the same message as the other contacted governments, later recalling the message essentially stating "If resistance to the Taliban and al-Qaeda means something to you, we can hold. We can fight. We will fight. But if you wanted to help Commander Massoud only — he is not with us anymore. To compensate for his loss, we need more help than in the time when he was alive." Saleh also stressed to Blee that word must not get out about Massoud's death, to prevent a collapse of the Northern Alliance's military lines. Blee, dutifully notified the White House of the news. After only a few hours, news services were openly reporting that Massoud had been killed, citing confirmations from anonymous Bush administration officials. Saleh called Blee back, stressing the difficulty that the White House leak had created. Returning to questions of support from the U.S., Saleh told Blee "The decision is that we will fight. We will not surrender. We will fight to our last man on the ground. This resistance was not about Massoud. It was about something much much bigger. We will hold... What can you do for us?" Blee, on Monday, 10 September 2001, needing a few days to plan, told Saleh: "Let me come back to you on this."

Also on the day following Massoud's assassination, one day before the September 11th attacks, bin Laden and Ayman al-Zawahiri were attending a vigil for the father of former Taliban interior minister. At the gathering, two Saudi-born al-Qaeda members bragged to the Taliban deputy interior minister, Mullah Mohammed Khaksar, that Massoud had been killed. Khaksar rebuffed the news, citing the Northern Alliance's statement that he had only been wounded. The Saudis responded "No, believe me, he is gone" and boasted that it had been done at the order of bin Laden. On Tuesday, 11 September, al-Qaeda would conduct the deadliest terrorist attack in history and prompt a multi-decade Global War on Terrorism, beginning with an American-led invasion of Afghanistan. The timing of the attack, two days before the September 11th attacks has garnered significant attention. The exact date of the attack was not dictated by the attackers who were on their ninth day in Northern Alliance guesthouses awaiting an invitation from Massoud or his associates to conduct the interview. Insufficient evidence is available to prove or disprove the claim that Massoud's assassination was planned tactically to disable the American-allied Northern Alliance before a potential post-9/11 American invasion of Afghanistan.

=== International reporting ===
On 10 September 2001, the British Broadcasting Company (BBC) was the first major outlet to discuss news of the assassination. The BBC's Afghanistan correspondent, Kate Clark, published a profile on Massoud, noting an "assassination attempt" that had only left Massoud "wounded." Unaware of the attack's success, almost certainly the result of Massoud's colleagues' decision to conceal news of his death, the article nonetheless explains:

It is difficult to over-estimate how serious a blow it would be for the alliance if it transpires that he has been seriously injured or killed in the attack... So far, despite some intense fighting, neither side has gained much territory. But the loss of Ahmed Shah Massoud would push the balance, perhaps, decisively, in the Taleban's favor.

— BBC Afghanistan correspondent Kate Clark, Profile: The Lion of Panjshir

The only major U.S. newspaper to publish news of the assassination prior to the September 11th attacks was The New York Times. On the fourteenth page of the International section on September 11th, written and printed before the attacks began, the Times published an article titled Reports Disagree on Fate of Anti-Taliban Rebel Chief. The article first provides the Northern Alliance statement, with assurances from Massoud's brother Ahmad Wali Massoud, that Ahmad Shah Massoud was lightly wounded but recovering in a hospital in Dushanbe where "doctors are very optimistic." The article then, indicative of White House and State Department leaks contrary to the express pleas by Amrullah Saleh in notifying the CIA of the truth, states:

United States intelligence officials said today that they strongly believed that Mr. Massoud had been killed in the attack. They said the Central Intelligence Agency had reliable reports that after the bombing, Mr. Massoud died on a helicopter en route to Dushanbe, the capital of next-door Tajikistan. The White House and State Department remained cautious on the matter. "I personally can't say he's dead," one White House official said.

— New York Times

Confidence in reports of Massoud's death came on 14 September 2001, three days after the September 11th attacks, following a statement by French Foreign Minister Hubert Védrine to Agence France-Presse (AFP): "It appears to be confirmed that Ahmed Shah Massoud, the head of the Afghan opposition, has died." Védrine's statement was widely republished on 15 September, amplified by the fallout of the September 11th attacks.

== Official investigations ==
=== Scotland Yard ===
At the request of Massoud's brother and Afghan ambassador to London, Ahmad Wali Massoud, Scotland Yard initiated a formal investigation into the assassination. The service justified its jurisdiction citing Yasser al-Siri's residence in London. Al-Siri, granted political asylum in Britain 1994 after receiving an in-absentia death sentence for the attempted murder of the Egyptian prime minister, was well-known to British security services as a close friend of al-Qaeda co-founder Ayman al-Zawahiri. Residing in London, Zawahiri's fraudulent letter authenticating the operatives as members of the Islamic Observation Centre, bore al-Siri's signature as head of the center.

Teams from Scotland Yard traveled to Kabul to begin interviews and photographing evidence. Though evidence had been collected and al-Siri arrested by the British, Pakistani President General Pervez Musharraf quietly asked Britain to drop the case and it did. This request for intervention continues to spur suspicions of Pakistani involvement or complicity in the assassination.

=== Belgium ===
On 26 November 2001, Belgian and French police detained 14 accused of connections to Osama bin Laden. Six were charged and eight released.

On 30 September 2003, a court in Brussels sentenced Tarek Maaroufi, who had urged Dahmane to travel to Afghanistan in pursuit of jihad, to six years on charges of aiding in the assassination of Massoud through his involvement in a fraudulent passport ring.

In February 2005, Malika el-Aroud, the widow and of lead attacker Abd as-Sattar Dahmane who had encouraged her husband's plans to travel to Afghanistan and joined him at al-Qaeda's Darunta training camp near Jalalabad, was charged by Belgian police along with her second husband, Moez Garsalloui, for their ties to al-Qaeda. Despite al-Aroud's outspoken support for the group and a CNN interview in which she explained how she ran an online forum for al-Qaeda announcements and propaganda, el-Aroud was acquitted. In June 2007, however, Garsalloui was found guilty of inciting violence and support for criminal organizations while el-Aroud was found guilty for aiding and abetting him.

Receiving only a suspended sentence, el-Aroud was detained once more in December 2008, and, in May 2010, was found guilty and convicted of "leading a terrorist group linked with al-Qaeda" which principally involved the recruitment of fighters in Belgium and France and facilitation of their travel to Afghanistan.

=== France ===
French police, using the serial number provided by French journalist Jean-Pierre Vincendet, identified the camera used in the assassination as the one stolen from Vincendet in December 2000.

On 18 May 2005, three French residents: Adel Tebourski, Abder Rahman Ameroud, and Youssef el-Aouni, were sentenced to 2–7 years for providing logistic support to the two assassins, including funding and the provision of stolen passports. Facing a maximum of 10 years, the three men convicted were said to have operated a France-based al-Qaeda network training in the Forest of Fontainebleau (south of Paris), in the French Alps, and on the coast of Normandy. Two other suspects, Ibrahim Keita and Azdine Sayeh, were acquitted. In the investigation, which the presiding judge clarified was not the investigation into Massoud's assassination, Tebourski (41) admitted to investigators that he had helped finance Dahmane's travel to Afghanistan, but wasn't aware of their operational target (Massoud). On 7 August 2006, Tebourski was deported to Tunisia on assurances of humane treatment from the Tunisian government but with protest of Amnesty International and Human Rights Watch citing fears of torture by Tunisian police. Upon arrival in the capital Tunis, Tebourski was briefly questioned by border police and promptly released.

=== Republic of Afghanistan ===
In April 2003, Afghan President Hamid Karzai established a special commission, to be headed by then-Afghan interior minister Ali Ahmad Jalali, to investigate Massoud's assassination. It is not apparent the results of the commission or if it ever convened.

=== United States ===
A November 2001 Defense Intelligence Agency (DIA) report partially declassified through a Freedom of Information Act request on Massoud's assassination analyzed the connection between the assassination of Ahmad Shah Massoud and the September 11th attacks days later. The report suggests Massoud's intelligence apparatus had collected information about an attack planned by Osama bin Laden, larger than the 1998 East Africa embassy bombings, but key details remain classified.

Through Northern Alliance intelligence efforts, the late commander Massoud gained limited knowledge regarding the intentions of the Saudi millionaire, Usama bin Laden (UBL), and his terrorist organizatiion al-Qaida, to perform a terrorist act against the U.S. on a scale larger than the 1998 bombing of the U.S. embassies in Kenya and Tanzania [REDACTED]. In April 2001, Massoud addressed the French and European Parliaments in Paris. In his televised speech he warned the U.S. government about UBL [REDACTED].
Although Commander Massoud was fighting the Taliban forces over the control of Afghanistan, he was not a threat to UBL and the al-Qaida organization. To Massoud, UBL was a Saudi citizen, exiled to Afghanistan due to his challenge to the legitimacy of the Saudi monarchy. After the terrorist strikes on the U.S. embassies in Africa, and receiving intelligence for his forces regarding UBL's future attacks, Massoud began to warn the west of UBL and al-Qaida [REDACTED].

— Report: The Assassination of Massoud Related to 11 September 2001 Attack

== Allegations of Pakistani involvement ==
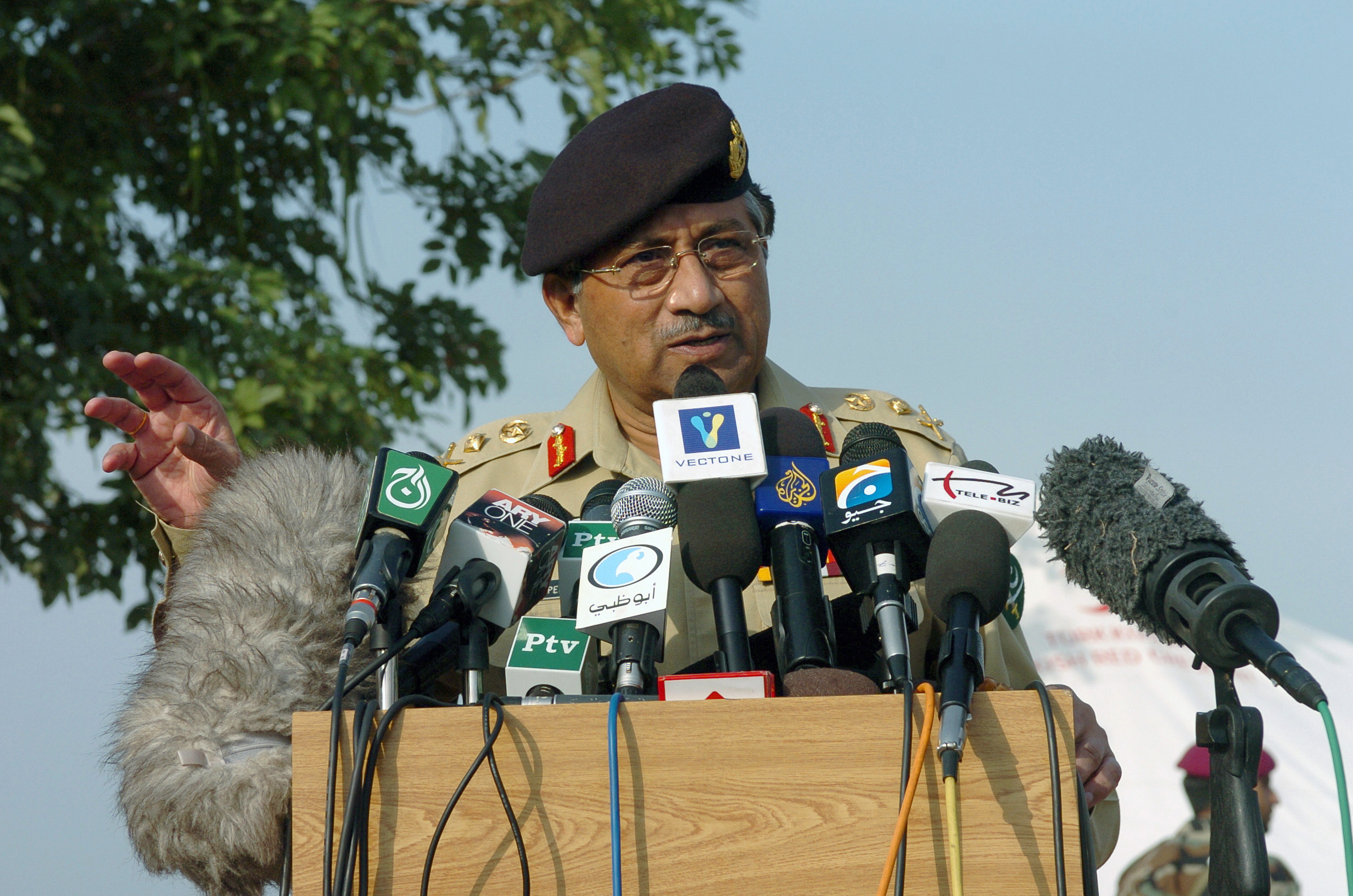
Pakistani President General Pervez Musharraf

Though the validity remains publicly unknown, Pakistan's chief intelligence and covert action agency, the Inter-Services Intelligence (ISI), faces allegations of involvement in or prior knowledge of the assassination of Ahmad Shah Massoud. Most of these sources cite a combination of factors to include ISI's post-1994 comprehensive support and loyalty to the Taliban against the Northern Alliance, ISI's well-documented history of clandestine support to South Asian Islamist jihadist groups (including al-Qaeda), Massoud's position as a vocal critic of Pakistani support to the Taliban and interference in Afghan affairs, Massoud's friendly relationship with rival India's intelligence services, and Pakistan's quiet request to have the British investigation of the assassination squashed in its infancy.

Massoud's close friend and advisor Masoud Khalili who wrote:

When I was in my hospital bed in Germany [following the explosion]... I thought very carefully about who would be behind this attacks because I did not want to blame someone else. I realize what I say is conjecture based on circumstantial evidence: I believe Osama bin Laden and the Pakistani ISI were behind the murder. This originated from Massoud's trip to France in May 2001... Osama bin Laden wanted to create a religious depth within Afghanistan as well as Central Asia and could not do this without removing Massoud. The ISI wanted strategic depth in Central Asia and again Massoud stood in their way... The murder of Commander Massoud would be a gift to Mullah Omar, the Taliban leader, and the Pakistani ISI.

— Masoud Khalili

Massoud's friend and biographer, Sandy Gall, is assured of ISI's involvement, writing "They were provided with one-year multiple-entry visas — virtually unheard of for visiting journalists. A few days later, they flew to Islamabad, the capital of Pakistan. All this would seem to confirm that the whole operation had been carefully planned and that Pakistan's ISI was deeply involved." In an interview, Gall asked an unnamed former Afghan intelligence chief if the heads of ISI were privy to the plot. The intelligence chief stated "I am 100 percent sure. Without the ISI, it couldn't have happened. And this is my question: if they weren't involved, why did they stop Scotland Yard's investigation?"

Beyond Masoud Khalili and Sandy Gall, other prominent proponents for this theory include Ahmad Wali Massoud (brother of Ahmad Shah and then-Afghan ambassador to London), Northern Alliance and National Resistance Front (NRF) leader Muhammad Fahim Dashti, as well as Afghanistan's first vice president and later longest-serving spy chief, Amrullah Saleh.

=== Pakistani response ===
In 2001, Pakistan's deputy high commissioner in London, Attiya Mahmood, stated that an investigation of their records showed the Pakistani visas used by the two operatives "must have been forged" and denied that they had been issued by Pakistani consulates in Britain.

== Commemoration ==
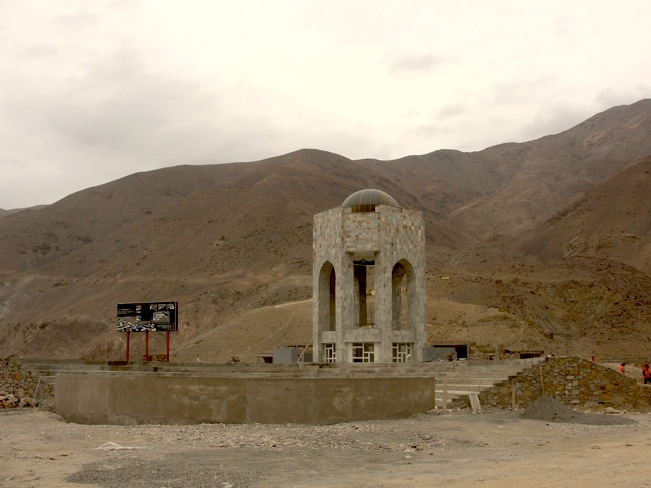
Massoud's tomb in 2010

=== Burial and tomb ===
With news of Massoud's death widely-known, Massoud's body was flown by helicopter (presumably from Tajikistan) to the Panjshir Valley where he was buried in his home village of Bazarak on 16 September 2001, exactly one week after his death.

==== Reports of Taliban desecration ====
Shortly after the Taliban's recapture of Afghanistan following the complete withdrawal of NATO forces, videos emerged of the glass structure over Massoud's tomb shattered, days after the Taliban entered the Panjshir Valley. The Taliban also posted videos rummaging through Massoud's mausoleum. On 15 September 2021, Pakistani news channel Geo TV sent a reporter to Massoud's tomb who denied claims that damage had been done to the tomb. Taliban spokesman Zabihullah Mujahid denied reports of the tomb's desecration.

=== Massoud Day ===
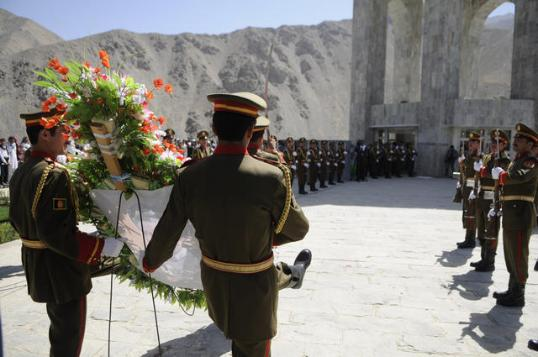
Wreath laying ceremony by the Afghan National Army on Massoud Day

Prior to the 2021 Taliban takeover of Afghanistan, September 9 was celebrated as an Afghan national holiday under the names "Massoud Day" or "Martyrs' Day" (Dari: روز شهدا, the latter name honoring others as well as Massoud). The week in which it takes place was at times referred to as "Martyrs' Week".

Typical annual celebrations of Massoud Day included parades through downtown Kabul, wreath laying ceremonies at Massoud's tomb attended by senior government officials, popular gatherings at Kabul's Massoud Square, and parties hosted in Massoud's native Panjshir Valley.

In 2002, on the first anniversary of Massoud's assassination, Afghan President Hamid Karzai traveled to Massoud's tomb in Panjshir to pay his respects, stating "We are here to day because of what [Massoud] did before he lost his life for Afghanistan." In 2011, on the tenth anniversary, Afghanistan's first vice president, Mohammad Qasim Fahim, called Massoud "Afghanistan's national hero and a defender of his country" at an event hosted in a Kabul school. In 2015, on the fourteenth anniversary, Massoud's brothers Ahmad Wali and Ahmad Zia attended a wreath-laying ceremony in Kabul's Massoud Square. Ahmad Wali used the events to call for blood donations in support of Afghan security forces.

On the 20th anniversary of Massoud's assassination (in 2021), Sandy Gall, a Scottish journalist and close friend of Massoud, published the principle biography of Massoud Afghan Napoleon, which includes a detailed account of the assassination.

On the 22nd anniversary, members of the Austrian Parliament held a conference, led by the Ahmad Shah Massoud Foundation to commemorate Massoud and discuss the post-2021 Taliban-run Afghanistan.

== See also ==
- National Resistance Front (NRF)
- Killing of Yasser Abu Shabab, similar event
