= Bijan Omrani =

British historian (born 1979)

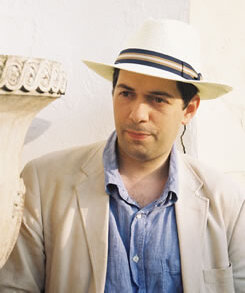
- Omrani in 2011
- Born: 1979 (age 46–47); York, England
- Occupations: Writer, scholar, teacher
- Spouse: Samantha Knights KC
- Writing career
- Subjects: Travel, Classical History, Afghanistan and Central Asia, Middle Eastern Current Affairs
- Website: bijanomrani.com

Bijan Omrani (born 1979) is a British historian, journalist, teacher, barrister and author of Persian descent. His work ranges from Classical scholarship to cultural and religious history, as well as current affairs across Asia.

== Early life and education ==
Omrani was born in York, England, in 1979. He studied at Wellington College, Berkshire before reading Classics and English Literature at Lincoln College, Oxford. He later studied at King's College London. He has a doctorate in Classics and Ancient History from the University of Exeter.

== Family and personal life ==
Omrani is related to one of the British Army officers responsible for demarcating the northern boundary of Afghanistan in 1885 and surveying Afghan tribal territories in the North West Frontier Province, the artist and surveyor Lt Richard Eyles Galindo.

His paternal family is from north-western Iran, and his maternal one from England, though with the British Empire in India in the 18th–19th century.

He is married to Samantha Knights KC, a barrister at Matrix Chambers.

== Career ==
Omrani taught Classics at Eton College and Westminster School where he contributed new Latin verse to school ceremonies. He was editor of the Asian Affairs journal from 2014-2022. He was called to the Bar in 2018. He is an Honorary Associate Research Fellow in the department of Classics and Ancient History at the University of Exeter. He also lectures at the British Museum, Royal Society for Asian Affairs, SOAS, King's College London, and the Pakistan Society. He was a trustee (2018-23) of the Royal Society for Asian Affairs.

He is the author of several books, as well as a frequent contributor for specialised articles pertaining the Afghanistan-Pakistan border problems. His 2005 book on Afghanistan, co-authored with Matthew Leeming, was described in The Telegraph in 2022 as "one of the best books of any genre ever written about the country". He has previously questioned the legal basis of the Durand Agreement but now he considers it to be valid but unsatisfactory, and that there is an urgent need for a wider regional solution to the problem perhaps based on a recognition of the line but combined with shared sovereignty in the neighbouring tribal areas.

Omrani was interviewed by France 24 in 2011 about the Afghan-Pakistani border problems, and was also featured in The New York Times in 2011, after an incident on the Pakistani border.

His 2017 book, Caesar's Footprints: Journeys to Roman Gaul, has the distinction of being endorsed both by the British Prime Minister, Boris Johnson, as well as the French Prime Minister Édouard Philippe, who took the book to read whilst on the road campaigning during the European Elections in May 2019. Omrani was interviewed about the book on the BBC Radio 4 Today Programme after its UK launch in June 2017. The book was shortlisted in 2018 for the American Library in Paris Book Award, for "the most distinguished book of the year, written and published in English, about France or the French."

He is a regular contributor to the Literary Review, The Critic, and The Oldie. In public debates has critiqued the notion of cultural appropriation.

In 2021, Omrani led a successful campaign to keep the National Trust property Shute Barton open to the public.

=== Books ===
- Afghanistan, A Companion and Guide, (Odyssey, 2005, republished 2007, 2nd edition 2010)
- Asia Overland: Tales of Travel on the Trans-Siberian and Silk Road (Odyssey, 2010)
- Iran: Persia Ancient and Modern (co-author), (Odyssey, 2010)
- Caesar's Footprints (Head of Zeus, 2017; Pegasus Books 2018 (US))
- God is an Englishman: Christianity and the Creation of England (Forum Press, April 2025)

=== Contributor of chapters ===
- Beyond the 'Wild Tribes': Understanding Afghanistan and its diaspora (2010)
- Afghanistan Revealed: Beyond the Headlines, released by the Afghan Appeal Fund, 2012

== Academic articles and speeches ==
=== Afghanistan ===
- “Will we make it to Jalalabad?” 19th century travels in Afghanistan (2006)
- "Afghanistan and the Search for Unity" (2007)
- "Charles Masson of Afghanistan: Deserter, Scholar, Spy" (2007)
- "The Durand Line: History and Problems of the Afghan-Pakistan Border" (2009)
- "Rethinking the Durand Line: The Legality of the Afghan-Pakistan Frontier" (October 2009)
- "Making Money in Afghanistan: The First Western Entrepreneurs 1880-1919"
- "The Durand Line: Analysis of the Legal Status of the Disputed Afghanistan-Pakistan Frontier"

=== Classics ===
- Joint Winner of BBC Radio 3 Sonnet Competition, 2001
- Virgil: Eclogues 4.28 (with Prof. David Kovacs)
- Author of Horatian Latin Ode to the 2012 London Olympics, endorsed by Mayor of London Boris Johnson, and included in an anthology of Latin poetry
- Address to the Horatian Society (2014), published in the proceedings of the Society

== Awards ==
- Caesar's Footprints - Shortlisted for the American Library in Paris Book Award 2018, for "the most distinguished book of the year, written and published in English, about France or the French."
- BBC Radio 3 Sonnet Prize, 2001, for a sonnet on "Holy Baptism".

== Memberships ==
- Fellow of the Society of Antiquaries, Royal Geographical Society, Royal Society of Arts, and Royal Asiatic Society. Liveryman of the Worshipful Company of Educators, City of London. Member of the Athenaeum.
