= Ar Rass raids =

Series of raids in Ar Rass

- Location of Al-Qassim Region in Saudi Arabia
Date	April 2005
Location	Ar Rass, Al-Qassim Region, Saudi Arabia

Casualties and losses
Over 50 security forces injured	15 militants killed 7 captured

In April 2005, Saudi authorities launched a series of raids in Ar Rass that killed 15 alleged militants, and captured 7 others. More than fifty Saudi security forces were injured in the gunbattles.

Among those said to be killed, were the following men;

- Karim el-Mejjati
  - His 11-year-old son Adam
- Saud Humud al-Utaibi
- Abdul-Karim Muhammed Jubran Yazji
- Hani ibn Abdullah Al-Joaithen
- Faisal ibn Muhammad Al-Baidhani
- Majed ibn Muhammad Al-Masoud
- Fawaz Mufdhi Al-Anazi
- Abdul Rahman ibn Abdullah Al-Jarboue
- Nawaf ibn Naif Al-Hafi
- Abdussalam ibn Suleiman Al-Khudairy
- Talib Saud Al-Talib
- Houcine Haski
- Younes Khiari

Among those said to be captured, were the following men;

- Saleh al-Oufi
- Adel ibn Saad Al-Dhubaiti
- Hamad ibn Abdullah Al-Humaidi
- Saleh ibn Abdul Rahman Al-Shamsan
