= Karim el-Mejjati =

Moroccan-French criminal

Abdelkrim Thami Driss el-Mejjati عبد الكريم المجاطي
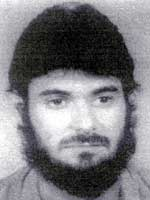
- Mejjati in 2003
- Born: October 30, 1967; Morocco
- Died: 5 April 2005 (aged 37); Ar Rass, Saudi Arabia
- Cause of death: Ar Rass raids by Saudi authorities
- Other name: Bashir Al-Maghribi Abu Ilyas/Elias Abu Ins
- Spouse: Fatiha Mohamed Taher Housni el-Mejjati

Karim Thami el-Mejjati (October 30, 1967 – 5 April 2005) was a Moroccan-French convicted terrorist who has been claimed to have aided the Riyadh compound bombings, the 2003 Casablanca bombings, the 2004 Madrid train bombings and the 2005 London bombings as member of the Moroccan Islamic Combatant Group.

He was killed, along with his 11-year-old son, by Saudi authorities in a series of raids in April 2005. His wife maintains that he was not connected to all the attacks but insinuates that he had arranged attacks against Saudi Arabia, provoking a violent response.

== Life ==
A medical student, el-Mejjati was born to a wealthy Moroccan father who worked in commerce and French mother who worked in cosmetics. They enrolled him in a French-speaking school from which he graduated in 1986. He also spoke English and sub-par Arabic. He kept a poster of Clint Eastwood taped to his bedroom wall, and dreamed of traveling to the United States. A secular Muslim, he reportedly ate pork and drank alcohol in contradiction with Islamic tenets, and enjoyed partying at Les Sablettes beach resort, as well as visiting Ceuta and Melilla.

On September 25, 1991, he married a Tunisian-American named Fatiha, who was seven years older than he was and had been dismissed from her job at the Casablanca medical school where he was studying because she started wearing the niqab face-covering. A 1985 law graduate, she later remarked that the student unrest over the management's attempts to fire her were likely what brought both her and el-Mejjati back to being observant Muslims. He dropped out of medical school, and they traveled to an Islamic conference in Paris for a month. They had two sons, named Ilyass and Adam.

By 1992, he'd returned to France and begun selling Moroccan handicrafts to support his desire to travel and volunteer as a Bosnian mujahideen. After one tour in Bosnia, he returned to bring his wife back to the Balkans with him, but was stymied by Germany's refusal to grant a visa. Returning alone, he was arrested for a month by Croatian forces, before being released at the request of the French government, although he was forbidden to return to Bosnia for five years.

Upon returning to Morocco, he rented a two-room apartment and began wearing Afghan clothing and a long beard. When women visited, he and his male friends would sleep in their cars parked on the street, while the women slept inside. Neighbours later recalled that he once loudly berated a couple for their public display of affection.

In early 1994, he traveled to Mecca on the hajj pilgrimage, and then continued on to Afghanistan, where he enrolled at the Khalden training camp where he contracted malaria and had to be sent home to Morocco. Once, upon returning to Morocco, he was questioned about the Pakistani visa in his passport and the Abdullah Azzam book he was reading.

Around this time, his wife was diagnosed with cancer. He maintained a relationship with Yusuf Fikri, leader of the Takfir wal-Hijra.

In 1996, he took a second wife at the urging of his wife, the Belgian Fatihah al-Hawshy who lived in England and was a friend of his wife.

Around 1997, he traveled to New Jersey on the invitation of a friend for several months. It was one of two visits he made to the United States prior to 1999. He later listed the address of a New York City bookseller, Abdulrahman Farhane, as his own - later entered as evidence against Farhane following accusations he financially supported terrorism.

While American authorities claimed he hadn't entered the country since 1999, Saudi media reported that he traveled back to the United States with al-Hawshy, his second wife, in 2000 and dropped her off there while he traveled to Pakistan.

In July 2001, el-Mejjati and his wife determined to leave Morocco permanently, and flew to Spain for two weeks while awaiting their entry visa to Iran. When Italy declined their request for travel documents, they flew out of Frankfurt instead. After landing in Tehran, they crossed the border into Afghanistan the following day. He traveled to Kandahar, ostensibly to seek out Osama bin Laden even though he had no intentions of joining al-Qaeda, but was disappointed to discover the militant leader had already left the city. He later managed to see both bin Laden and Mullah Omar.

Following the American reprisal bombings following the September 11 attacks, el-Mejjati and his wife left Afghanistan and traveled to Dhaka, Bangladesh where they remained for ten months after their passports were seized due to fake Pakistani visa stamps. They moved to Riyadh, Saudi Arabia, using false Qatari passports, after that. Some have claimed the move was authorised by bin Laden to build a "Saudi network".

== Entry into militant plots ==
After moving to Riyadh, el-Mejjati agreed to allow Khalid al-Juhani, a veteran of the First Chechen War and Afghan Civil War who was being sought by Americans, stay with his family. He asked his wife to help him find a wife for al-Juhani, who was not supposed to be involved in any more fighting.

On March 23, 2003, his wife and 10-year-old son Ilyas left the city to try to reach an ophthalmologist. They had been originally intended to travel with al-Juhani, which caught the attention of the Mabahith secret police. However, al-Juhani argued he wasn't feeling well and asked a brother and his wife to instead accompany el-Mejjati and her son. The group was nonetheless arrested by authorities who hoped that al-Juhani was present. When questioned, his wife confirmed to police that el-Mejjati was indeed living in Riyadh, but refused to write an open letter in the newspapers calling for her husband to surrender himself to authorities stating that he hadn't done anything wrong.

After his wife's arrest, he is believed to have fallen in with the Moroccan Islamic Combatant Group, and to have provided training to its members in a forest outside Rabat. His name was mentioned in connection with the Riyadh compound bombing in May of that year.

Days before the May 16 attack in Casablanca, el-Mejjati is believed to have fled to Spain. Arguments that he had dressed as a woman to travel unnoticed were rebuffed by his wife who pointed out he stood 6'4".

On June 20, 2003, when it was discovered that al-Juhani had been among the men killed in the Riyadh compound bombings, Saudi Arabia transferred el-Mejjati's wife and son to Moroccan custody, flying them on a private jet through Cairo into Morocco.

In September 2003, the FBI issued an alert for four people they alleged "pose a threat to U.S. citizens", including Abderraouf Jdey, Adnan G. El Shukrijumah and the previously unknown Zubayr al-Rimi and el-Mejjati.

While in Spain, el-Mejjati became associated with Jamal Zougam, who had helped construct the bombs, leading to the suggestion that he had been involved in the March 11 Madrid bombings.

In December 2003, he was sentenced to 20 years' imprisonment in absentia by a Moroccan court, for his role in the Casablanca bombings.

On March 17, 2004, his wife and son were released from prison. Police set up a 24-hour stakeout of her house, and watched her every move. In April, Belgian newspapers in Antwerp received threatening notes that made reference to el-Mejjati, and suggested that Jewish locations in the city might become targets in the future. While authorities now began searching Europe in earnest for his whereabouts, others suggested that he had fled to Pakistan, Iran, Syria or Iraq. In early 2005, Riyadh officials intercepted text messages being sent by el-Mejjati to Great Britain authorising hawala money transfers.

== Death ==
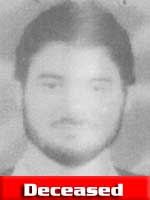
FBI-released photo noting his death

El-Mejjati, as well as his 11-year-old son, Adam, and the leader of al-Qaeda in Saudi Arabia Saud Hamoud 'Abid al-Qatini al-'Otaibi, were among those killed in April 2005 in a series of Ar Rass raids by Saudi authorities. Saudi security forces had not known el-Mejjati would be present when they surrounded their first target, a house with approximately eight occupants. When shooting began, the occupants fled to a nearby construction site where the battle lasted until the following morning. A columnist later suggested that el-Mejjati had shot his son after he was captured by Saudi forces. Saudi authorities also alleged that el-Mejjati had killed a foreigner living in the Kingdom, and attacked a police patrol in Al-Ghat "with the support of his son", despite being only 11 years old. At the time of his death, he was #4 on the Kingdom of Saudi Arabia's "26 Most Wanted" list.

El-Mejjati was survived by his wife and 12-year-old son Ilyass. A friend of the family had phoned to tell her that he had just heard a report that el-Mejjati had been killed on the television, to which she replied "Alhamdulillah". She then wrote to the Moroccan Ministry of the Interior, and its Saudi counterpart, to ask them to positively confirm the identity of her husband and son through DNA testing, with which they complied. She sought permission to travel to Saudi Arabia to claim the body of her husband and son for proper burial, and proposed traveling with his second wife, stating that she could not find closure until she had seen the bodies herself.

== Aftermath ==
Following his death, his wife gave an interview to France 3 television and to Moroccan newspapers stating that her husband had been a mujahid, and not a terrorist. However, in other interviews she stubbornly stated that it was wrong to consider him a member of GICM since he "only belongs to Al-Qaeda". She later joined the Islamic State of Iraq and the Levant in Syria and headed the Al-Khansaa Brigade.

Later analysts suggested that he was closely tied to Salafia Jihadia or Abu Musab al-Zarqawi. Following the July 7 bombings in London three months after his death, Saudi Arabia stated that they had warned Britain of the impending attack, sending them an intelligence file that contained details of el-Mejjati and his alleged connection to lead bomber Mohammad Sidique Khan.
