= Mohamed Mahmoud (Islamic militant) =

Egyptian-Austrian Islamic militant

- محمد محمود
- Born: 18 June 1985; Vienna, Austria
- Died: 28 November 2018; Syria
- Cause of death: US Air Strike
- Other name: Abu Usama al-Gharib
- Organization: Islamic State
- Spouse(s): Mona Salem Ahmed (unknown); Ahlam al-Nasr (married 2014-2018)
- Father: Sami Mahmoud

Mohamed Mahmoud (Arabic: محمد محمود; 18 June 1985 – 28 November 2018), known as Abu Usama al-Gharib (Arabic: أبو أسامة الغريب), was an Austrian Islamic militant and a senior leader in the Islamic State.

== Early life ==
He was born 18 June 1985 in Vienna, Austria. His father Sami Mahmoud was a member of the banned Muslim Brotherhood in Egypt. Fearing arrest, he fled to Austria and received asylum five years later.

== Islamic militancy ==
In October 2002, aged 17, he traveled to Iraq via Italy. He was trained in a camp by Ansar al-Islam in Iraqi Kurdistan. He was gone for eight months, but he was arrested two months before the war in Iraq started. In 2005 he founded the 'Organization of the Islamic Youth's in Austria.

In Austria, by late 2006, he became a leader in the Global Islamic Media Front, working alongside his former wife to translate videos and texts from Arabic into German. He had connections to Atiyah Abd al-Rahman. He called on Muslims to boycott the 2006 Austrian legislative election, handing out leaflets.

In 2007, authorities became suspicious when he started to buy ingredients for a possible suicide belt and the Media Front published a video threatening to carry out attacks in Germany and Austria if they did not withdraw their troops from Afghanistan. On September 12, 2007, he and his wife were arrested in Vienna. He denied that he had anything to do with the production of the video or that he had any plans for a suicide attack.

In April 2008, al-Qaeda in the Islamic Maghreb called for his release from jail in Austria, in exchange for freeing two Austrian captives. While incarcerated, he held a two-month hunger strike in an attempt to secure his release.

Mohamed Mahmoud was released from prison in Austria on September 15, 2011, after serving a four-year prison sentence for being a member and supporter of Al-Qaeda and its affiliates. He moved to Berlin upon release, and between 2011 and 2012, he moved to Solingen alongside Denis Cuspert. There he founded the Salafi organisation Millatu Ibrahim.

On April 26, 2012, Hesse Interior Minister Boris Rhein expelled him from Germany, asking him to leave within one month. He left to Egypt.

In March 2013, a video appeared on the Internet, in which Mahmoud burned his Austrian passport and threatened terror attacks. A few days afterwards, he was arrested in Hatay, Turkey with a fake Libyan passport. It was alleged he was planning on traveling to Syria and he was held until 19 August 2014 in a Turkish prison. Austrian pleas to extradite him were denied by the Turkish state. Due to Turkish law, police could only hold him for a short period and he was released subject to conditions of reporting to police regularly. He ignored the reporting restrictions and disappeared to Syria.

== Islamic State ==
Mahmoud is believed to have been close to Turki al-Binali. The two met in Libya at some point, where Mahmoud received an ijazah from him.

On 5 November 2014, he posed alongside corpses in the Syrian city of Raqqa, and in August 2015, he appeared in an Islamic State video alongside Abu Omar al-Almani. Filmed in the Syrian city of Palmyra, the pair executed two Syrian Arab Army soldiers.

Mahmoud was reportedly killed in a United States airstrike in Syria.

== Family ==
While in Austria, Mahmoud was married to a woman named Mona Salem Ahmed. They later divorced after she left him. He was married to Syrian poet named Ahlam al-Nasr on October 11, 2014. Mahmoud had three younger brothers and a sister. His father was active in al-Gama'a al-Islamiyya, but disavowed his son’s views.
