= Iman al-Bugha =

University professor of fiqh who joined ISIS

Iman Mustafa al-Bugha was a professor of fiqh at the University of Dammam in Saudi Arabia who left to join the Islamic State of Iraq and the Levant (ISIL, aka Daesh, aka ISIS) in 2014. She traveled there after her three teenage children, who went to ISIL territory in Syria before her. Public statements released by ISIL referred to al-Bugha as "a scholarly torch [that] supports the Islamic Caliphate." Her writings about her decision to join ISIL and her life under their rule were of interest to academic researchers. Her oldest daughter, Ahlam al-Nasr, is known as "poetess of the Islamic State."

== Background, family and joining ISIL ==
Al-Bugha is the daughter of Syrian imam and religious scholar Mustafa al-Bugha [ms], who had four wives and numerous children in a conservative Muslim family. He was the author of numerous works, particularly in the field of Shafi'i jurisprudence. Al-Bugha would later say that her father "refused to buy us a television so that it would not be an idol that we cling to" and the children read books to entertain themselves instead. She particularly preferred religious studies and read biographies of Muhammad and his companions.

Al-Bugha got a PhD in Sharia from Damascus University, with a specialization in Usul al-Fiqh, or Islamic jurisprudence. She also got a postgraduate diploma in education from Damascus University. She married a pharmacist from the Haddad family in Damascus, a man who had memorized the Quran. They would have three children. Al-Bugha encouraged her oldest daughter, Ahlam al-Nasr, to learn poetry from an early age and said al-Nasr was "born with a dictionary in her mouth."

In 2001, the family moved to Saudi Arabia and al-Bugha began work at the University of Dammam. She taught at the College of Applied Studies and Community Service and published several books, one of which was about the state of women in Islam. In Saudi Arabia, al-Bugha became known for her religious fundamentalism and involvement in Salafi circles. She is known to have preached about jihad to gatherings of Muslim women. Following 9/11, al-Bugha said later, she secretly admired Osama bin Laden, whom she called "my king" in her writing so no one would know the identity of who she was writing about.

Al-Bugha's daughter Ahlam al-Nasr, who was reportedly 15 years old at that time though some reports claim she was older, traveled to ISIL's caliphate with her 14-year-old sister and 13-year-old brother, Mustafa, in 2014. "Ahlam al-Nasr" is a nom de guerre; her birth name may be Shaima al-Haddad. Ahlam al-Nasr would become known as "the Poetess of the Islamic State."

Later in 2014, al-Bugha resigned her posts in Damman and followed her children to ISIL. She was believed to have been in her forties at the time.

== Membership in ISIL and fate of family ==
After her arrival in Raqqa, al-Bugha wrote a six-page pamphlet titled "I am an ISIS believer, a ‘Daeshi’ before ISIS was created", saying,

Since I began reading about the plight of Muslims…and I had read the biography of the Prophet (PBUH), the companions, and Islamic conquests, I read them dozens of times, and I read history in all its revolutions, and I studied the jurisprudence of jihad at the hands of senior scholars. Since I did all that, I have been a Daeshite in thought and method; I was a Daeshite before Daesh existed, and I have known since then that the only solution for Muslims is jihad.

In the pamphlet, al-Bugha wrote she could find nothing in ISIL's actions that conflicted with Islam, and spoke about "real" jihad, meaning Muslims killing aggressors against Muslims. The pamphlet was published by an Islamic State media outlet.

She had settled in ISIL-occupied Mosul, Iraq by October 2014. That same month, one of al-Bugha's sisters tweeted that her "behavior does not represent the family as a whole, or the opinion of her father, Dr. Mustafa al-Bugha, whom she neither consulted nor informed about her decision."

Al-Bugha spoke highly of life in the caliphate, calling it a "utopia". She strongly supported ISIL's version of the sharia, which included making the niqab mandatory for women and the carrying out of hudud penalties, and said ISIL's policies had resulted in people living a "pristine" life under their rule. She described public education in ISIL-occupied territories, and praised the caliphate's emphasis on marriage. She justified ISIL's theft, destruction and sale of antiquities, calling caring for ruins and artifacts a "joke" used by dictators for years to satisfy unbelievers. She also supported ISIL's execution by burning of Jordanian pilot Muath al-Kasasbeh in January 2015 after he crashed his plane on ISIL territory; al-Bugha said his burning was justified because he was part of the coalition against ISIL.

Al-Bugha reportedly helped contribute to the studies of ISIL's Fatwa Issuing and Research Department.

In June 2016, al-Bugha announced on Facebook the death of her son Mustafa, an ISIL fighter whom she called by his nom de guerre "Abu al-Hassan al-Dimashqi." She wrote that he was heavily wounded by tank fire and taken to her in a dying state, and "we rejoiced, looking at him. He remained calm until he died."

Mustafa would have been about 15 years old at the time of his killing. An ISIL publication later said al-Bugha "endured his loss and continued her path in jihad."

Her oldest daughter Ahlam al-Nasr was known to be alive as of November 2020. A March 2021 paper on Al-Bugha’s life, published in the Journal of Legal, Ethical and Regulatory Issues, notes her ultimate fate and that of her family is unclear.

== See also ==
- Aqsa Mahmood – Scottish woman who joined ISIL (1993–2019)
- Bird of Jannah – ISIS blogger from Malaysia
- Zehra Duman – Australian-born Turkish Islamist
- Fatiha Mejjati
- Malika El Aroud
