= Ahlam al-Nasr =

Syrian poet

Ahlam al-Nasr (Arabic: أحلام النصر) is a Syrian Arabic poet, and known as "the Poetess of the Islamic State". Her first book, The Blaze of Truth, was published in 2014 and consists of 107 poems. She is considered one of the Islamic State's most famous propagandists and gives detailed defenses of terrorist acts. Ahlam al-Nasr is a nom de guerre meaning "dreams of victory" or "triumph" in Arabic. Her birth name may have been Shaima al-Haddad.

== History ==
Al-Nasr became known for her poems about the Syrian revolution in 2011 and early 2012. She was raised in Saudi Arabia where she attended a private school in al-Khobar. She is from Damascus. Her family fled to Kuwait shortly after the Syrian Civil War began, but al-Nasr returned to Syria in 2014. She was accompanied by her 14-year-old sister and her 13-year-old brother. Al-Nasr is believed to have been 15 years old at the time although some reports claim she was older.

On October 11, 2014, al-Nasr was married in the courthouse of Raqqa, Syria to Mohamed Mahmoud, known as Abu Usama al-Gharib, an Austrian Vienna-born preacher. Her first book, The Blaze of Truth, was published that autumn. It consisted of 107 poems, mostly written in monorhyme with classical Arabic meters. Some of the poems were made into Islamic State nasheeds. Recitations of the poems, sung a capella, could be found on Youtube. In her writings, Al-Nasr portrayed the ISIL caliphate as a paradise for pious Muslims where she saw "women wearing the veil, everyone treating each other with virtue, and people closing up their shops at prayer times." She wrote a thirty-page essay defending ISIL's execution by burning of Jordanian pilot Muath al-Kasabeh.

According to Cole Bunzel, a Ph.D. candidate in Near Eastern Studies at Princeton University, many of her poems were published weekly by the al-Sumud Media Foundation. In November 2020, Bunzel reported she was still alive and had released a new poem celebrating a terrorist attack in Vienna.

== Family ==
Al-Nasr is the granddaughter of the Syrian imam and religious scholar Mustafa al-Bugha [ms]. Her father is a pharmacist and reputed hafiz. Her mother is Iman al-Bugha, who was a university professor of fiqh at the University of Dammam, Saudi Arabia. Al-Bugha encouraged her daughter to learn poetry from an early age and said Al-Nasr was "born with a dictionary in her mouth." Al-Bugha joined her daughter in the Islamic State territory, and published a six-page pamphlet describing herself as "a Daeshite before Daesh existed". Public statements released by ISIL referred to Al-Bugha as "a scholarly torch [that] supports the Islamic Caliphate."

Al-Nasr has two younger siblings who traveled to Syria with her. Her brother Mustafa became an Islamic State fighter and was killed in June 2016. Her sister married an Islamic State fighter.
