= Asian Affairs =

- Discipline: Asian studies
- Language: English
- Edited by: Bill Hayton

Publication details
- Former names: Journal of the Central Asian Society; Journal of the Royal Central Asian Society
- History: 1914–present
- Publisher: Routledge on behalf of the Royal Society for Asian Affairs (United Kingdom)
- Frequency: Quarterly
- Open access: Hybrid
- Impact factor: 1.1 (2024)

Standard abbreviations
- ISO 4: Asian Aff.

Indexing
- ISSN: 0306-8374 (print); 1477-1500 (web)

Links
- Journal homepage; Online access; Online archive

Asian Affairs is a quarterly peer-reviewed academic journal covering research on politics, international relations, and contemporary issues in Asia, with contributions from multiple disciplines such as sociology, anthropology, economics, and cultural studies. It is published by Routledge on behalf of the Royal Society for Asian Affairs (RSAA). The journal was established in 1914 as the Journal of the Central Asian Society, renamed Journal of the Royal Central Asian Society from 1931 to 1969, and has been published under its current title ever since. The editor-in-chief is Bill Hayton.

== History ==
The first issue of the journal was printed in early 1914, following several years of circulated compilations of Society papers that included accounts of meetings and lectures. The inaugural issue featured contributions such as A Visit to Mongolia by E. Manico Gull, reports of Captain F. M. Bailey's explorations, and analyses of China's coal supply. The journal's cover continues to use a variant of the red tone introduced in these earlier publications.

Book reviews were introduced in 1921, beginning with Sir Percy Sykes' A History of Persia. Subscriptions outside the RSAA's membership followed in 1922. In 1942, during the Second World War, wartime economic measures forced the third and fourth issues to be combined. From 1965 the journal formally adopted this triannual format, which remained in place until 2018. That year, the journal reverted to quarterly publication, originally to accommodate special issues, beginning with a 2018 collaboration with the Woodrow Wilson International Center for Scholars; however, the special-issue format was not subsequently continued.

At its inception, the journal was edited by the Secretary of the RSAA, beginning with C. S. Hughes, and assisted by a sub-committee of the Society's now-defunct Council. An editorial board was established in 1961, at which point the formal post of editor was also created. The first to hold the role was Kay Beckett (née West), formerly of Encyclopaedia Britannica and International Affairs.

== Editors-in-chief ==
The following persons have served as editors-in-chief:

- 1961–1969: K. E. Beckett
- 1969–1970: O. Stallybrass
- 1970–1972: A. Russell
- 1972–1975: P. Howard
- 1975–1982: P. Robertson
- 1982–1982: E. Charlton
- 1982–1984: K. E. Beckett
- 1984–1992: R. A. Longmire
- 1992–1992: K. E. Beckett
- 1992–1995: V. C. Funnell
- 1995–1997: J. G. T. Shipman
- 1997–2001: Susan Pares
- 2001–2005: Michael Sheringham
- 2005–2014: Barney Smith
- 2014–2022: Bijan Omrani
- 2022–present: Bill Hayton

== Abstracting and indexing ==
The journal is abstracted and indexed in:

- Asian-Pacific Economic Literature
- Bibliography of Asian Studies
- Cambridge Scientific Abstracts bibliographical series (CAS)
- De Gruyter Saur bibliographical series
- EBSCO databases
- Gale bibliographical series
- H. W. Wilson bibliographical series
- International Political Science Abstracts Database
- The National Library of China
- Periodica Islamica
- ProQuest databases
- PubMed
- Scopus
- World Banking Abstracts
- World Magazine Bank

According to the Journal Citation Reports, the journal has a 2025 impact factor of 1.1.

== Most cited articles ==
As of 2025, the following four articles have been cited most often:

1. Purbrick, Martin (2019). "A report of the 2019 Hong Kong protests". Asian Affairs. 50 (4): 465–487. doi:10.1080/03068374.2019.1672397.
2. Ortmann, Stephan (2015). "The Umbrella Movement and Hong Kong's protracted democratization process". Asian Affairs. 46 (1): 32–50. doi:10.1080/03068374.2014.994957.
3. Ahmed, Saleh; Eklund, Elizabeth (2021). "Climate change impacts in coastal Bangladesh: Migration, gender and environmental injustice". Asian Affairs. 52 (1): 155–174. doi:10.1080/03068374.2021.1880213.
4. Onley, James (2009). "The Raj reconsidered: British India's informal empire and spheres of influence in Asia and Africa". Asian Affairs. 40 (1): 44–62. doi:10.1080/03068370802658666.

== See also ==
- Asian studies
- Critical Asian Studies
- The Journal of Asian Studies
