= Fatiha Mejjati =

Moroccan jihadist

- فتيحة المجاطي
- Born: Fatiha Mohamed Taher Hassani; 1961 (age 64–65); Casablanca, Morocco
- Other names: La Veuve Noire; Oum Adam

Fatiha Mohamed Taher Mejjati (née Hassani; born 1961) is a Moroccan jihadist. She is the widow of Karim Mejjati, a co-founder of the Moroccan Islamic Combatant Group and a member of Al-Qaeda. Karim Mejjati is suspected of involvement in planning the 2003 Casablanca bombings and the 2004 Madrid train bombings.

Mejjati is believed to be living in Syria. In 2023, she was designated a terrorist by the Moroccan Ministry of Justice, and an arrest warrant was issued against her in connection with alleged terrorist activities.

== Biography ==
Fatiha Mohamed Taher Hassani was born in 1961 in Derb Sultan, Casablanca, to a father who worked as a carpenter and a mother who was a housewife. She grew up in a middle-class family with five sisters and a brother. Her family practiced moderate Islam during her childhood.

Hassani received a Baccalauréat in Literature and Human Sciences in 1980 and earned a degree in French private law from Hassan II University of Casablanca in 1985.

In 1990, she joined the Moroccan Institute of Management as a management assistant. According to her own later accounts, Hassani's religious radicalization began in 1991, influenced by the Gulf War. She stated that during this period, she "found happiness only in the mosque" and began wearing the hijab permanently. She was not permitted to wear a hijab at her workplace, which led to tensions with her employer. Students at the institute circulated a petition in her support, which was signed by Karim Mejjati. Hassani later gave Mejjati, who reportedly had limited knowledge of Arabic at the time, a French translation of the Quran. The two married in September 1991, less than a year later, without the knowledge of Mejjati’s parents.

The couple subsequently moved to France. In 1992, Mejjati traveled to Bosnia to fight as a combatant associated with al-Qaeda, a decision attributed in part to his radicalization during the preceding period. He later returned to France in an attempt to bring his family back to Bosnia, however, Hassani was denied a visa. When Mejjati attempted to return to Bosnia alone, he was arrested by the Croatian Army and detained for nearly a month. Following his release, he was banned from the region for five years.

The Mejjatis had two sons, Adam and Ilyas. According to the Morocco World News, Mejjati was a founder of the Moroccan Islamic Combatant Group, which the outlet reported had pledged allegiance to Osama bin Laden. In July 2001, the family of four moved to Afghanistan. Hassani later stated that her time in Afghanistan under Taliban rule was "the most wonderful period" of her life. The family subsequently relocated to Pakistan.

In 2003, Mejjati reportedly travelled to Saudi Arabia, where he was said to have served as an Al-Qaeda agent. He has also been alleged to have played a role in planned the May 2003 Casablanca bombings.

On 25 March 2003, Hassani was arrested in Riyadh along with her son Ilyas, who was then ten years old. Both were detained and questioned by Saudi authorities regarding Mejjati’s whereabouts. Hassani acknowledged that her husband was in Riyadh, but refused a request by the authorities to write an open letter urging him to surrender. She and her son were held in Saudi Arabia until June 20 2003, after which they were transferred to Morocco, where they remained in detention until March 17 2004.

Mejjati was later reported to have played a planning role in the 2004 Madrid train bombings and the 2005 London bombings. In April 2005, he and his son Adam were killed during a gunfight with Saudi security forces in Ar-Rass. Adam was eleven years old at the time of his death. In a May 2005 interview with the Gazette of Morocco, Hassani stated that her husband was not a terrorist, describing him instead as "a Mujahid who went to Bosnia and Afghanistan to fight the enemies of Islam and bring justice to Muslims."

In 2008, France 24 interviewed Hassani and published a profile following her public warning that France could face jihadist attacks. In the interview, she denied having any ties with al Qaeda and stated that she was not aware any specific plans to attack France. She explained that her warning was based on her perception that, despite France having opposed the 2003 invasion of Iraq, it had subsequently adopted policies she viewed as hostile toward the Muslim world.

Sometime after the death of her first husband, Hassani married Omar al-Omrani Hadi, a Salafi-jihadist activist who had been sentenced by the Moroccan authoritied to 14 years in prison on terrorism-related charges. The couple never met in person, and Moroccan authorities did not recognize the marriage or permit Hassani to visit him in prison, citing the absence of a civil marriage contract. Hassani protested outside the prison where al-Omrani Hadi was held, calling for his release, and also publicly advocated for the rights of other detainees in Moroccan prisons.

On June 29, 2014, Hassani posted a message on Twitter declaring her allegiance to Abu Bakr al-Baghdadi. On July 5, she arrived in Raqqa, then the de facto capital of the Islamic State of Iraq and the Levant (ISIL). She later posted a photograph of herself posing in front of a court building in Jarabalus, a town on the Syrian-Turkish border that was under ISIL control at the time. In November 2014, Jeune Afrique reported that Hassani had married a senior ISIL figure, described as an aide to al-Baghdadi.

Her surviving son, Ilyas Mejjati, was reported to have worked for ISIL's media apparatus. He was married to a Swedish woman. ISIL-affiliated social media accounts reportedly publicized Hassani's arrival in Syria, referring to her as the "mother of believers."

After relocating to territory controlled by ISIL Hassani assumed leadership of the Al-Khansaa Brigade, an all-woman unit responsible for enforcing ISIL's interpretation of female modesty and dress codes. She also became a member of ISIL's media committee and was described by sources as one of the most influential women within the organization.

Following the collapse of ISIL's self-proclaimed caliphate in 2019, Hassani's Swedish daughter-in-law and three grandchildren were captured after the Battle of Baguz Fawqani. Hassani herself was subsequently detained at the Al-Hawl refugee camp. In 2020, she reportedly escaped from the camp and was believed to be sheltering in Idlib, along with more than a dozen other women who had also escaped from Al-Hawl.

== See also ==
- Iman al-Bugha
- Malika El Aroud
- Samantha Lewthwaite
- Tomasa Pérez Molleja
