= Public Health Square =

Coordinates: 34.5367°N 69.1927°E

Public Health Square, formerly called Massoud Circle, is a roundabout in Kabul, Afghanistan. It was named after Ahmad Shah Massoud during the presidency of Hamid Karzai. It was recently changed back to its original name.

The square is close to building of the former U.S. Embassy and has the road leading to Kabul International Airport. It is located in the eastern part of Wazir Akbar Khan.
