= Al-Khansaa Brigade =

All-female police unit in Islamic State (2014-2017)

- لواء الخنساء
- Official emblem of the Al-Khansaa Media Brigade
- Leader: Fatiha el-Mejjati
- Dates active: February 2014– Present (Largely inactive since 2019)
- Active regions: Islamic State
- Size: 60 (2014)
- Part of: Islamic State
- Wars: the Syrian Civil War

The Al-Khansaa Brigade (Arabic: لواء الخنساء) was an all-women police or religious enforcement unit of the jihadist group Islamic State (IS), which operated in its de facto capitals of Raqqa in Syria and Mosul in Iraq.

== History ==
Formed in February 2014 and initially consisting of around sixty women, the brigade was used to enforce Sharia law, mainly in IS-occupied Raqqa and Mosul, but also in refugee camps such as al-Roj and al-Hawl as IS territory collapsed. The group was probably named after Al-Khansa, a female Arabic poet from the earliest days of Islam. It was unique in the Muslim world as, in other regimes with similar systems of religious police (such as Saudi Arabia), only men are permitted to enforce hisbah among women.

After initially being set up to enable men disguised as women to be identified through searches at checkpoints, the group's role was expanded to police and punish women according to IS regulations, with the size of the group expanding to include 1000 women. An IS official, Abu Ahmad, said in 2014, "We have established the brigade to raise awareness of our religion among women, and to punish women who do not abide by the law." The outfit has also been called IS's 'moral police'.

The brigade had its own facilities to enforce sex segregation. Its members were aged between 18 and 25, receiving a monthly salary of LS 25,000. According to defectors interviewed by Sky News, the Al-Khansaa Brigade included many foreign women, and recruits were "trained for a month". Their pay is estimated to be between £70 and £100 [STG] per month. By September 2014, it was estimated by The Independent that up to 60 British women had joined the brigade. Aqsa Mahmood, a woman from Glasgow, is believed to have held a senior role.

== Activities ==
The Brigade were known for their brutal violence against women. They oversaw brothels of enslaved Yazidi women and searched women at checkpoints. Women who went outside without a male chaperone or who did not follow the IS dress code in public (an all-black burqa or a loose abaya, hijab and niqab, with no colors, no high heels and everything completely covered including the eyes) were subject to arrests and beatings by Al-Khansaa, using whips and metal sticks. A metal tool called a “biter”, which ripped chunks of flesh, was also used.

One example of crimes punished and sentences administered by Al-Khansaa were those for two women in Raqqa in 2015, who received 20 lashes for wearing form-fitting abayas, five for wearing makeup underneath their abayas, and another five for "not being meek enough when detained". The woman’s husband was often beaten also. In another incident, in 2014, members of the Al-Khansaa Brigade raided a girls’ school and arrested ten students, a secretary and two teachers because their veils were too thin. They locked them up for six hours and whipped some of them 30 times each. In the book Soldatessa del Califfato, the protagonist, a Tunisian woman who joined IS, stated she worked in the brigade alongside British national Khadijah Dare. She said Dare enjoyed making other women cry and would recite verses from the Quran while torturing female prisoners.

The Al-Khansaa Brigade was instrumental in disseminating IS propaganda and recruiting foreign militants, particularly from France, Germany, and the United Kingdom. Recruiters were known to use identity politics, particularly ethnic tensions between Sunni and Shia Muslims, to lure "young women who feel oppressed as Sunni Muslims" towards IS.

In April 2017, IS released a recruitment video for female hackers claiming to have hacked over 100 social media accounts over the previous month. According to Iraqi News, in 2017 Al-Khansaa members were used as snipers to defend IS-held Mosul against assaults by Iraq's security forces. Though IS has not held any territory since 2019, there have been reports of the group's members infiltrating refugee camps in Syria and Iraq, with some of these reports having come as late as 2021.

== See also ==
- List of armed groups in the Syrian Civil War
- Brides of the Islamic State
- Women in warfare and the military (2000–present)
