= Malika El Aroud =

Belgian-Moroccan jihadist (1959–2023)

Malika El Aroud (Arabic: مليكة العرود; 1959 – 6 April 2023) was a Belgian-Moroccan who was convicted of Islamic terrorist activities by a Belgian court in 2010. She had ties to Al-Qaeda and was known as one of Europe's most prominent internet jihadists.

El Aroud was the widow of Abdessatar Dahmane, one of the men who assassinated the anti-Taliban resistance leader Ahmad Shah Massoud in Afghanistan on 9 September 2001. In 2003 she was one of 22 people tried in Belgium for complicity in Massoud's murder, but was acquitted due to lack of evidence. In June 2007 she and her new husband Moez Garsalloui were found guilty by a Swiss court of operating websites that supported Al-Qaeda.

In 2010 El Aroud was sentenced by a Belgian court to eight years in prison for terrorist activities. Belgium then tried unsuccessfully to deport her to Morocco. She died in Belgium on 5 April 2023.

== Biography ==
El Aroud was born in Morocco and moved to Brussels with her family as a child. She said in a 2006 interview that she did "everything that is bad" as a young adult and had several failed relationships. It was when she was in her thirties and a single parent to her daughter, that she converted to Islam and began frequenting the Centre Islamique Belge in Molenbeek, which was run by a Syrian Islamist who had links to jihadist networks. It was 1991 and El Aroud was 32. In 1999, she was introduced to Abdessatar Dahmane, a Tunisian who had come to Brussels in 1987. Dahmane was a jihadist who had contacts all over Europe, and he had tried and failed to enter Kosovo to join the conflict there in 1996. Dahmane and El Around married in 2000. Shortly thereafter, he went to Afghanistan to an Al-Qaeda training camp.

In 2001 El Aroud joined her husband in Afghanistan, living in a camp at Jalalabad where she was a housewife. Her husband was sent on a suicide mission by Al-Qaeda to assassinate the anti-Taliban resistance leader Ahmad Shah Massoud. Anand Gopal says Dahmane was "the first suicide bomber in Afghan history." After Dahmane's death, Osama Bin Laden, whom El Aroud had already admired, gave El Aroud $500 to clear her debts. The Northern Alliance subsequently captured her, but she was able to escape during an attack by Al Qaeda forces, made it to Pakistan and went to the Belgian embassy in Islamabad to ask to be repatriated.

The widowed El Aroud was then repatriated to Belgium, where she stood trial along with 22 others for complicity in Massoud's murder. She claimed that she was doing humanitarian work and knew nothing of her husband's mission and was acquitted due to lack of evidence. "Your ideas are very extreme, but I cannot sentence you for them," said the judge.

After her release, El Aroud became an influential jihadist propagandist. In 2003, she married again. Her new husband was Moez Garsalloui, also a Tunisian radical, who lived in Switzerland and had a "nerdy enthusiasm for computers". They lived together in a small village near Fribourg and El Aroud wrote online under the name "Oum Oubeyda". She said, "It’s not my role to set off bombs. I have a weapon. It’s to write. It’s to speak out. That’s my jihad. [...] Writing is also a bomb." She contributed regularly to Francophone jihadist platforms and had dedicated subscribers. In 2004, she wrote her biography, "Les Soldats de Lumiere" (The Soldiers of Light).

In February 2005 El Aroud was detained along with Garsalloui in an anti-terror raid while living in Switzerland (near Fribourg) and operating websites in support of Al-Qaeda. In June 2007 a Swiss court found Garsalloui guilty of supporting criminal organisations and inciting violence via their websites and El Aroud guilty of aiding and abetting him. Garsalloui was given a six-month prison sentence, while El Aroud received an eighteen-month suspended sentence.

Returning to Belgium, El Aroud continued her internet propaganda. In 2008 she gave an interview to journalists Elaine Sciolino and Souad Mekhennet of The New York Times, in which she said "I have a weapon. It's to write. It's to speak out. That's my jihad. You can do many things with words. Writing is also a bomb." The director of Belgium's federal police force described her as a potential threat, saying: "Her jihad is not to lead an operation but to inspire other people to wage jihad".

In December 2008, El Aroud was one of a number of people arrested in Belgium on suspicion of having links with Al-Qaeda or of planning a terrorist attack, possibly on a two-day EU leaders' summit in Brussels. In February 2009, CNN presented a previous 2006 interview with El Aroud, as well as interviews with various people familiar with her activities or involved with her court proceedings, as part of the series "World's Untold Stories".

El Aroud went on trial in March 2010, accused with her husband Garsallaoui of heading a terrorist cell linked to Al-Qaeda and running a website that urged Muslims to sacrifice themselves in jihad. They stood trial with a further seven defendants, Garsallaoui and another defendant being tried in absentia. In May 2010, she was convicted of leading a terrorist group linked with Al-Qaeda which recruited militants in France and Belgium to fight in Afghanistan. She was sentenced to eight years in prison. Through friends, she was still able to post on jihadist websites while in custody.

In 2014 the government started proceedings to revoke El Aroud's Belgian citizenship. El Aroud challenged the proceedings but lost her case in the Court of Appeal in Brussels in November 2017. A few days later she was arrested in order to be deported to Morocco. She appealed the order, arguing she was at risk of being subject to torture, but lost her appeal in February 2019. The deportation did not go ahead due to a lack of cooperation from the Moroccan authorities.

In 2015, El Aroud's book "Les Soldats de Lumiere" was found in the home of Hayat Boumeddiene, a French terrorist and fugitive who participated in the January 2015 Île-de-France attacks. Her book was also found in the home of Yassin Salhi, who beheaded his employer and then hanged himself in prison.

El Aroud died in Belgium on 5 April 2023, at the age of 64.

== See also ==
- Fatiha Mejjati
- Iman al-Bugha
- Samantha Lewthwaite
- Tomasa Pérez Molleja
