= Saud Hamoud 'Abid al-Qatini al-'Otaibi =

Notorious member of the al-Qaeda terrorist group

- Born: 1971; Riyadh, Saudi Arabia
- Died: April 3, 2005 (age 34); Ar Rass, Saudi Arabia
- Known for: Alingance with al-Qaeda in Saudi Arabia
- Children: 7 children

Saud Hamoud 'Abid al-Qatini al-'Otaibi (1971 – April 3, 2005) was a senior member of al-Qaeda in Saudi Arabia. Al-Otaibi was responsible for bombings, including the attack on Al-Mohaya housing compound in Riyadh in 2003, Al-Otaibi was also involved in taking booby-trapped vehicles from Qasim to Riyadh, carrying out attacks on security officers and smuggling weapons into the Kingdom.

== Life ==
According to Asharq Al-Awsat newspaper that A-Qatini was born in the capital city Riyadh in 1971, According to Asharq Al-Awsat that he traveled to Yemen to visit sheik Muqbil bin Haadi al-Waadi'ee, and he was an extreme adherent of Islamic sharia (Islamic law). He was married and had 7 sons.

== Joining Al-Qaeda ==
Sometimes in the late '80s or early '90s Saud Al-Otaibi traveled to Afghanistan, apparently to work with an Islamic charity there, he had a personal relationship with Abdel Aziz al-Muqrin before September 11 attacks, Saud had been captured by the Saudi security forces more than once since 1991 to 2002.

== Death ==
Al-Qatini was killed in a 3-day battle with Saudi security forces in Ar Rass on April 3, 2005, alongside Karim el-Mejjati. The Interior Ministry confirmed the death of Saud Al-Otaibi on April 9, 2005.
