= Matthew Leeming =

British writer (1964–2022)

Matthew David Leeming (22 September 1964 – 29 November 2022) was a British adventurer and writer.

== Biography ==
Leeming was born in Winchester to David Leeming, an industrialist, and Veronica Leeming (née Lyons). He spent his childhood in Winchester and Old Alresford. He attended Bradfield School before studying theology at Trinity College, Oxford, where he graduated with second-class honors.

After university, Leeming initiated several business ventures, including an English language school during his Oxford years and later enterprises in the tile and printing industries. He completed an MBA at Lincoln College, Oxford, in 1999. Following employment challenges during the dotcom bust, he traveled extensively in countries including Afghanistan, Azerbaijan, and Ethiopia.

In Afghanistan, Leeming became involved in the tourism and energy sectors. He founded a tourism company that encountered initial setbacks related to local conflicts before achieving some success. He also contributed to journalism by writing for The Spectator and co-authoring a guidebook on Afghanistan; some of his other literary works remained unpublished due to editorial disputes.

In later years, Leeming encountered financial and personal difficulties, which resulted in periods of homelessness. He engaged in community service by contributing to initiatives for the homeless and other local projects in Winchester.

== Books ==
- 2005: Afghanistan: A Companion and Guide
