= Neil Sean =

British journalist

- Born: Mirfield, England
- Occupations: Journalist, broadcaster, writer

Neil Sean is a British journalist. Born in Mirfield in West Yorkshire to entertainers Ann Montini and Alan Scott, Sean first attracted attention as a singer, and released a cover version of Cliff Richard's "We Don't Talk Anymore", before taking up posts as a presenter at multiple radio stations. He later took up jobs as a writer, including for Metro, where he wrote the gossip column "The Green Room" for over ten years.

Sean then set up his own outfit, Maycon Productions, and released numerous books and DVDs including the book How to Live Like a Celebrity for Free and the DVD D.R. W.H.O.: The Lost Interviews, which attracted critical commentary on separate editions of Dave Gorman's show Modern Life is Goodish. He also spent a period as Travelodge's writer-in-residence and as an entertainment reporter for Sky News, Fox News, and NBC News.

== Life and career ==
=== Early life and journalism ===
Neil Sean was born in Mirfield in West Yorkshire, and attended the Mirfield Free Grammar. His first appearance on stage was at Variety Express at Battyeford Methodist Hall aged eight. His mother, Ann Montini, is a variety artiste who performed as a Marie Lloyd tribute act and set up Variety Express in 1959 as a derivative of Tonight at the London Palladium; his father, Alan Scott, was a comedian, and his brother, Mark Grant, presented dance charts for European networks. In 1997, Sean was working as a publicist under Barry I. Tomes, who set up Gotham Records in 1989, and in 2000, he and Montini released a cover version of Cliff Richard's "We Don't Talk Anymore".

In January 2003, he became a presenter for LBC and Heart. By that May, Sean had also begun writing a column in Metro, "The Green Room"; he claimed in a diary for Press Gazette to be ghostwriting ten columns for various outlets. In July 2011, The Independent's High Street Ken questioned the juiciness of the gossip printed by The Green Room, and in September 2014, Dave Gorman used an episode of his Dave show Modern Life is Goodish to express his admiration for "his ability to fill a gossip column five days a week for more than 10 years with almost no gossip" and opine that the column had a preoccupation with celebrities' smoking habits. In May 2014, Sean claimed in his column that TV presenter Phillip Schofield had a 40 a day cigarette habit, prompting Schofield to angrily tweet that he did not smoke and that Sean was a "pillock".

By 2006, he had left LBC for Capital, when he was working at Sky News as a supplier of show business news, which in turn he had left in 2008 to become royal reporter for Fox News, by which time he had columns in the Daily Star Sunday and New!. Initially under a contract where he was US-exclusive to Fox, by 2013, he had moved to NBC News, on the grounds that Fox had stopped calling. In August 2016, a pull-quote attributed to "Neil Sean, NBC News" was used to advertise a stage production of The Go-Between; after Mark Shenton attempted to verify where NBC had published Sean's opinion, he proceeded to remind him that he had been fired from the Sunday Express after they discovered nude images of him online. By 2020, he had begun contributing to Fox again.

=== Maycon Productions ===
After a distributor offered to buy archive material from his interviews, Sean founded Maycon Productions, with the intention of distributing them himself, and released the DVDs West End Stars in Conversation, Dr. Who Tales Lost in Time, and Dad's Army: The Lost Interviews, the last of which was released in April 2010. That year, for Westminster Live, he interviewed Mike Winters, a personal friend of his father who had worked with Winters when they were both jobbing comedians; this turned out to be his final recorded interview. In July 2011, an opportunistic PR sent an email alleging that Sean would release a memoir, "It's Not Where You Start", later that year, and in 2012, Sean released "From Hollywood to Yorkshire", an exploration of Jayne Mansfield's trip to Yorkshire later in life.

A subsequent DVD, D.R. W.H.O.: The Lost Interviews, featured a red telephone box on the back cover, and its blurb promised "extensive and revealing interviews" with David Tennant, who at the time played The Doctor in Doctor Who. Dave Gorman used an October 2017 edition of Modern Life is Goodish to analyse the DVD with Doctor Who expert Toby Hadoke, and found the DVD to be just under 40 minutes long, with numerous instances of poor editing and graphics. Hadoke's expertise showed that many of Sean's claims were factually incorrect, while both Gorman and Hadoke commented that much of its footage was irrelevant. Christopher Stevens of the Daily Mail used a review for the episode to describe the DVD as "littered with errors" and Gorman's review as a "blistering attack", while Christopher Bennion used a review for the episode in The Times described The Lost Interviews as "the shonkiest Doctor Who DVD ever made".

By 27 November 2017, the DVD was selling for £195.60 on Amazon; explaining himself on an episode of Richard Herring's Edinburgh Fringe Podcast recorded that day, Gorman noted that his usual Modern Life is Goodish dissections were tongue-in-cheek, with Sean being the only person he had given a "proper kicking" to, that Hadoke had been brought in as he was struggling to contain his hatred for Sean during run-throughs due to the "mean-spirited"-ness of his work, and opined that the DVD's high selling price was caused by algorithmic tacit collusion and an inability for the product to shift at £3.99.

=== How to Live Like a Celebrity for Free ===
In 2012, Sean announced his book, How to Live Like a Celebrity for Free, which contained a number of money-saving ideas, ostensibly from celebrities he had interviewed. The book used the same image of Sean as his earlier D.R. W.H.O.: The Lost Interviews DVD, and claimed to contain Beyoncé's discount method of maintaining her hair and to detail how Jennifer Lopez received a free makeover at a makeup counter before an audition and how Michael Caine travelled the world for free. He wrote the book while writer-in-residence at Travelodge, having been given the idea to become a writer-in-residence after encountering a man with a laptop in the Savoy Hotel, before approaching other chains and then them.

To promote the book, he made an appearance on Australian television, on which he alleged that William, Prince of Wales had suggested combining free hotel aftershave samples, that Jason Donovan had told him that he commuted by a self-renovated second-hand bicycle after appearing in Neighbours, and that Boris Johnson had told him that he visited his local library for the latest books, audiobooks, and newspapers. Dave Gorman used just over six minutes of a September 2014 episode of Modern Life is Goodish to opine that the last three of these did not constitute a celebrity lifestyle and neither did his book's tip to recycle gym wet bags to transport packed lunches, and suggested that one tip, that a "calling card for things like free menu-testing at all the top restaurants" was rushing to leave a posh hotel at the same time as an A-list celebrity and planting a kiss on their cheek in view of paparazzi, would constitute sexual assault.

Both Gorman and Emma Clayton of the Telegraph & Argus questioned Sean's suggestion that it was feasible to obtain free shoes by offering to be a shoe-tester, with the latter also questioning whether a customer would in fact find "a good Cartier belt, vintage cufflinks, a Hermes scarf" just by rummaging in charity shops, whether a record company's public relations department would supply free albums or concert invites without harassing for press cuttings, and whether banks would want to befriend customers just because they adopted a nonchalant air and asked about corporate hospitality offers. She did however describe the book as "a fun guide to shameless blagging".

=== Other works ===
Sean released a further book, Live from the London Palladium, in December 2014, which he launched at Mirfield Library, and promoted using an interview with Jo Good on BBC Radio London and at Hatchards in Piccadilly. The book included many of the stories he had compiled from his celebrity interviews, including from Mickey Rooney, Jason Donovan, and Joan Rivers, and included stories from the London site of Judy Garland's first British performance. A further book in 2016, I met Marilyn, was written about Marilyn Monroe, and suggested that she could have been First Lady of the United States.

From 2015, Neil Sean began presenting an interviewing series, Neil Sean Meets..., which included episodes with Jeremy Thompson, Les Hinton, Laurence Fox, Billy Boyd, Tommy Steele, Ann Montini, and Roger Moore. In September 2017, it was announced that Maycon would begin producing a weekly programme presented by Katie Hopkins, and in late 2020, Sean presented a six-part series on YouTube, "That Reminds Me!", in which he discussed careers with faded comedians; explaining himself to the British Comedy Guide, he stated that he had come up with the idea after meeting with comedy commissioners at a television channel, and finding that many of the names he was suggesting dismissed as too old-fashioned.
