= Lee Blakeley =

- Born: 16 August 1971; Mirfield, West Yorkshire, England
- Died: 5 August 2017 (aged 45); London, England
- Education: The Mirfield Free Grammar; Royal Scottish Academy of Music and Drama
- Occupations: Theatre director; Translator; Dramaturg; Broadcaster; Actor; Teacher; Script editor
- Years active: 2001–2017
- Spouse: Jonathan Foster (m. 2008–2017)

Richard Lee Blakeley (16 August 1971 – 5 August 2017) was a British opera and theatre director.

Born in Mirfield, West Yorkshire to Carol and Richard Blakeley, Blakeley was educated at The Mirfield Free Grammar School. He subsequently studied theatre at the Royal Scottish Academy of Music and Drama, beginning at age 18. He also studied at the University of Glasgow. He returned to the Royal Scottish Academy to study theatre directing. There, he was accidentally assigned as director of a student production of Gustav Holst's The Wandering Scholar. The resulting success initiated his career interest in opera direction.

Whilst at the Royal Scottish Academy, Blakeley had worked with David McVicar on the latter's production of Handel's Semele. Blakeley later worked at English National Opera (ENO), and re-connected with McVicar, who made Blakeley his assistant. He assisted McVicar at the Royal Opera House on its 2003 production of Die Zauberflöte and its 2004 production of Faust, and served as a regular revival director of these productions at Covent Garden.

In 2001, Blakeley directed the first dramatic staging of Handel's cantata Clori, Tirst e Fileno, at the gay nightclub Heaven in London. Other notable productions as director in his own right included the 2006 European premiere of Tobias Picker's Therese Raquin, his self-described 'breakout' production of Rusalka at Wexford Festival Opera in 2007, and the 2008 Scottish Opera production of Judith Weir's A Night at the Chinese Opera.

At the Théâtre du Châtelet in Paris, Blakeley directed the French premiere of Stephen Sondheim's A Little Night Music (2010), and subsequent productions of Sondheim's Sweeney Todd (2011), and of Sunday in the Park with George (2013), and Into the Woods (2014), The King and I (2014). His directorial work in theatre included Pat Kirkwood Is Angry.

Blakeley received a Winston Churchill Traveling Fellowship in 2007. This took him to many of the major opera houses of North America to study Lyric Artist Development and the Cultivation of Philanthropy for Opera. In North America, his directing credits included Madama Butterfly (2010), The Pearl Fishers (2012), The Grand Duchess of Gerolstein (2013) and Rigoletto (2015) for Santa Fe Opera, Orfeo ed Euridice for Minnesota Opera, and Les Contes D'Hoffmann for Canadian Opera Company. For Opera Theatre of Saint Louis, he directed the North American premiere staging of Handel's Riccardo Primo (performed in English as Richard the Lionheart, 2015) and the company's first staging of Verdi's Macbeth (2016).

In private life, Blakeley was married to Jonathan Foster. The couple resided in London. He died of a suspected heart attack.
