= Ledgard Bridge =

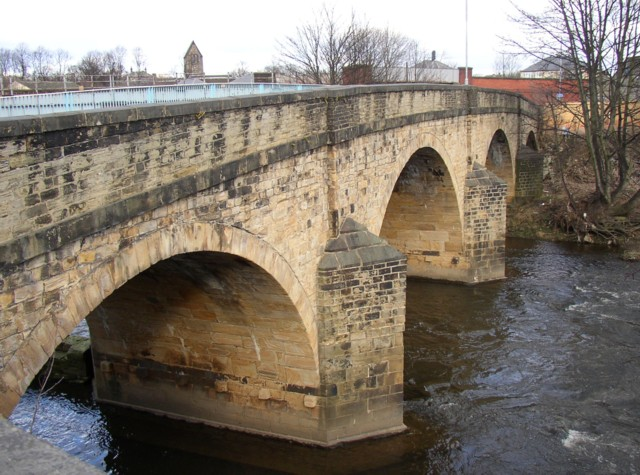
- Coordinates: 53.6719°N 1.6976°W
- Carries: Newgate Street
- Crosses: River Calder
- Locale: Mirfield, West Yorkshire
- Other name(s): Mirfield Bridge
- Heritage status: Grade II listed

Characteristics
- Design: arch bridge
- Material: Stone
- No. of spans: 4
- Piers in water: 2

History
- Opened: 1800

Ledgard Bridge crosses the River Calder in Mirfield, West Yorkshire, England. It was built in 1800 as a replacement for an earlier bridge in the same location and is a Grade II listed structure.

== History ==
The first bridge to cross the River Calder in Mirfield was a wooden structure built in 1303. This was replaced many times, one earlier stone bridge being named as Ledger Bridge on a 1773 map of the West Riding of Yorkshire. The 1800 bridge survived the great flood of 20 September 1946 which caused much damage along the whole valley.

== See also ==
- List of crossings of the River Calder
- Listed buildings in Mirfield
