= Mirfield Show =

UK agricultural show

Coordinates: 53.675°N 1.689°W

Mirfield Agricultural Show Society
- Company type: Not-For-Profit
- Founded: 1944 & 1995
- Headquarters: Mirfield, England
- Key people: Chris Ramsden (President); Karen Bullivant (Chair); Martin Ibberson (Vice Chair)
- Website: http://www.mirfieldshow.com

Mirfield Show is an annual agricultural show held at the Huddersfield Road Showground in Mirfield, West Yorkshire, England on the third Sunday in August. It is organised and run by the Mirfield Agricultural Society (MAS) as a not-for-profit event and regularly attracts over 6,000 visitors each year from across Yorkshire.

== The Showground ==
The Showground is situated near Mirfield town centre - adjacent to Crowlees Junior and Infant School and opposite Mirfield Memorial Park (home to Moorlands and Mirfield cricket clubs). The site is 5.5 acres (22,000 m^{2}) in area, and regularly hosts local football matches, fairs and the annual Mirfield Charity Bonfire organised by Mirfield Round Table.

=== The Rings ===
The show is centred on two rings. The first is the Main Ring which hosts the Horse & Pony Show in the morning, followed by main attractions in the afternoon, which have included interactive demonstrations of dogs, birds of prey, duck herding, racing terriers, Roman military re-enactments by the LEGIO SECVNDA AVGVSTA and classic car displays. It has also entertained the crowds with tug of war competitions, children's races and its locally famous Bush Tucker Challenge. The second is the Dog Ring which holds the Fun Dog competitions.

=== The Marquee ===
The marquee is one of the focal points of the show and is home to various rabbit, pigeon, flower, vegetable and domestic exhibitors - all competing for Best in Show awards. An additional section is allocated to craft stalls.

== History ==
=== 1944 (Original show) ===
The original Mirfield Show was founded during 1944 ‘to bring a little sunshine into the wartime lives of local people’. The president was Colonel James Walker, and it was opened by Councillor J H Barraclough, chairman of Mirfield UDC. The show reached its peak in the early 1960s and after several years of decline it ceased to take place.

=== 1995 (Revised show) ===
In 1995 Mirfield Agricultural Society was founded, and the show began again on Sunday 20 August, with duck herding, a tug of war, organised by Mirfield Sports Council and a display from Mirfield Martial Arts Club. Subsequent years have seen Tripe and Jelly eating competitions, sheep shearing, dog agility skills, motorbikes, majorettes, birds of prey, fire service displays, shirehorses, children's puppet shows, a horse powered threshing machine and performances from Knottingley Silver Band.

The 2003 show was put in doubt due to a lack of exhibitors and again the 2006 show when developers put forward plans to build a new community health centre on the Huddersfield Road Showground. In 2007, despite the early weather, the show pulled in the crowds with record entries in many events.

=== 2007 ===
The event was held on Sunday 19 August. The main ring events included 'Cyril the Squirrel and his Racing Terriers', Bushtucker Challenge (eating competition), and a display of the 'Roman Emperor's Horseguard'. Rachael Carter won the Bushtucker Challenge for the third year (and subsequently retired), whilst Haigh's Farm Shop team won the 'Tug of War' for the second year. The chairman for the event was Chris Ramsden. The show was opened by Mirfield Mayor Robert Bennett. The 1995 show was estimated to have drawn in around one thousand visitors and the 2007 event in excess of 5,000.

=== 2008 ===
The event was held on Sunday 17 August, under the direction of Karen Bullivant, who held the chair position for this year. It was opened by Margaret Watson of the Mirfield Reporter. Attractions include the award-winning Springer's Dog agility and Flyball Club, a demonstration of the 16th-century Japanese classical martial art of Takeuchi-ryu by Mirfield's Shoufukan Dojo and a new Banana eating competition. New classes were added for domestic rabbits and amateur gardeners, a children's colouring competition, a photography competition and a creative writing competition. Steve Pope won the Bushtucker Challenge, whilst Haighs Farm Shop team won the tug of war for the 3rd year running!

=== 2009 ===
The event took place on Sunday 23 August, again under the direction of Karen Bullivant, with the highest number of visitors so far, with about 10,000 visitors. The Tug of War was won by The Misfits from Alan Chappelow's Calder Farm and the Horse Show by Care Johnson. Events include the Trials Kings Bicycle Display Team, Ben Potter's Birds of Prey; the award-winning Knottingley Silver Band; the Grand Bush Tucker Challenge; pony rides, Pinxton Puppets, tug-of-war, cheerleaders, children's races, a fun beach, Alpacas and a food court.

=== 2010 ===
The event took place on Sunday 22 August and was reported to have had about 12,000 visitors passing through the gates throughout the day - with about 6,000 on the showground at its peak - breaking last year's biggest-ever attendance record of 10,000. The day's festivities, included an appearance of The Kangaroos Gymnastics Display Team; the Royal Artillery Parachute Display Team; Find Mirfield a Town Crier Competition; and Rabbit Jumping - as well as the horse and dog shows, flower and vegetable classes, and rabbit and domestic exhibits. The Tug-of War was won by Bradfield Brewery, beating last year's winners The Misfits in the final.

=== 2011 ===
The event was held on Sunday 21 August and the year's headline acts were the JHC Air Tattoo Helicopter Display Team and the Black Rock Llama Display Team. The show was scheduled to be opened by Lieutenant Colonel David Eastman MBE REME.

=== Show day images ===
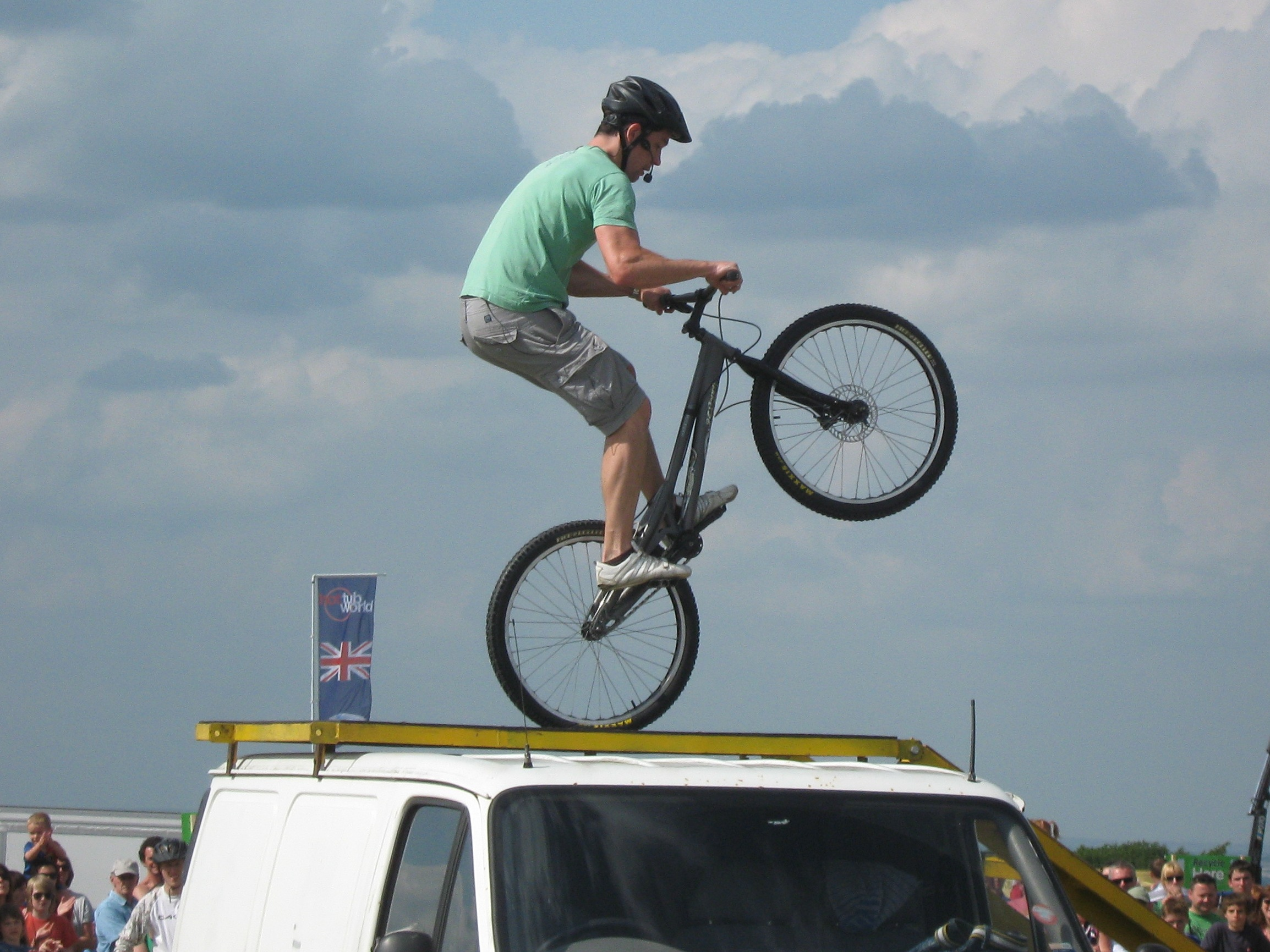
Trials Kings Bike Display Team

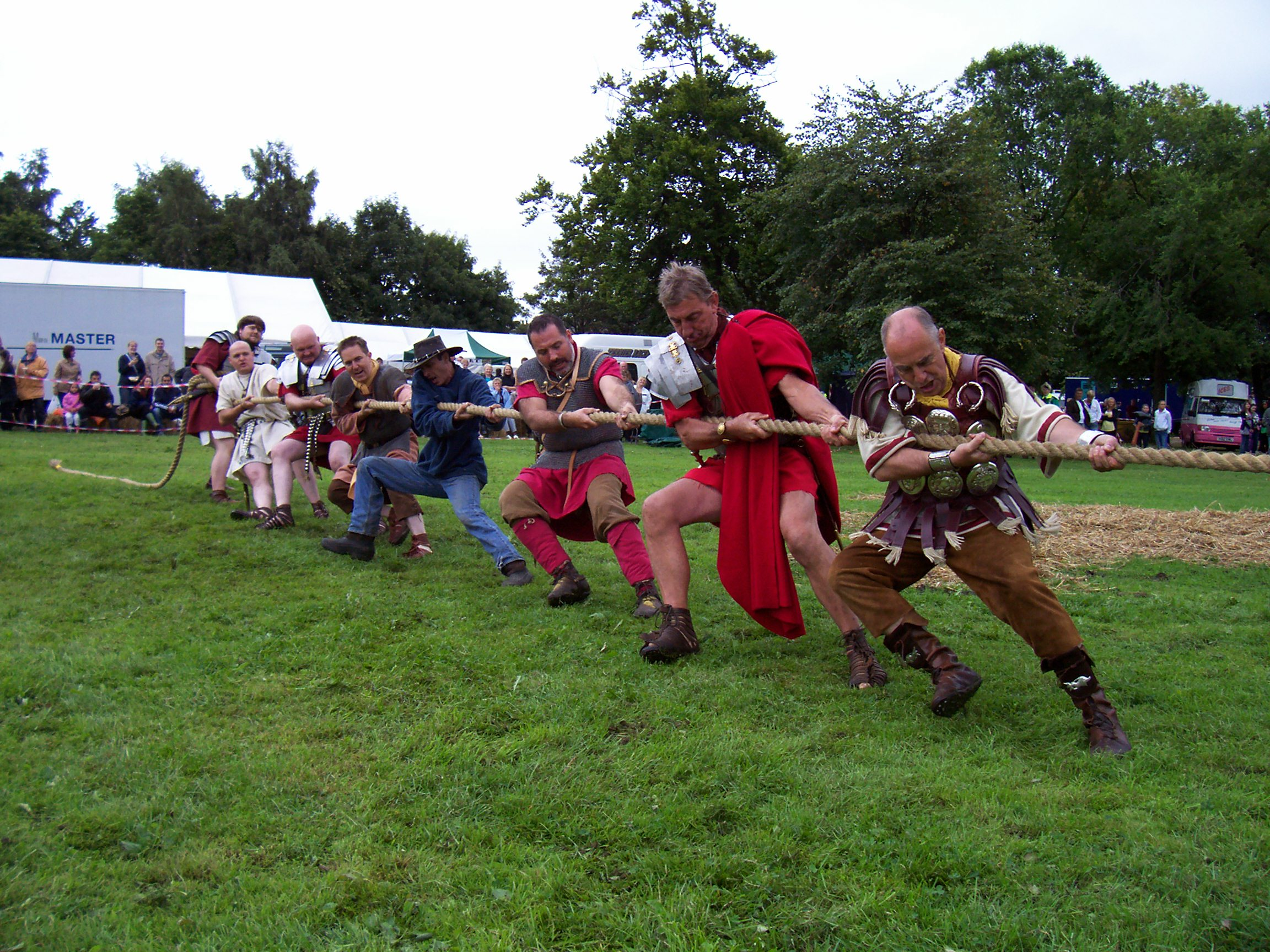
Roman Horseguard Tug of War team

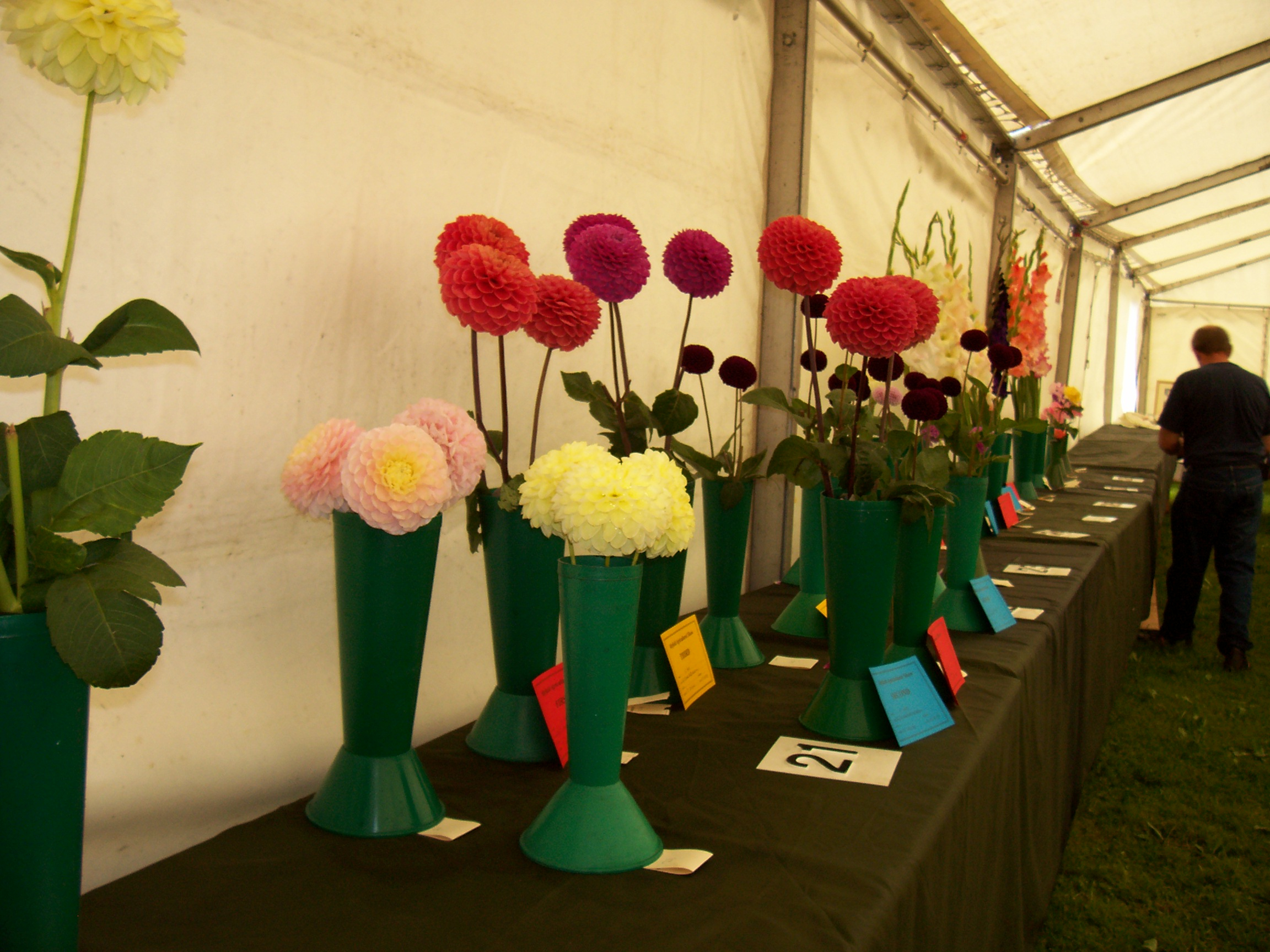
'Best in Show' Flower competition

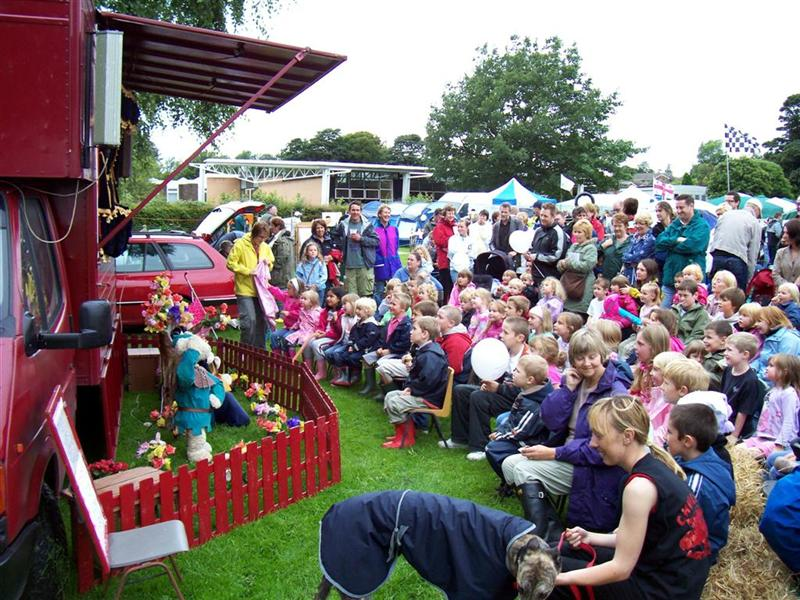
Children's Puppet Show

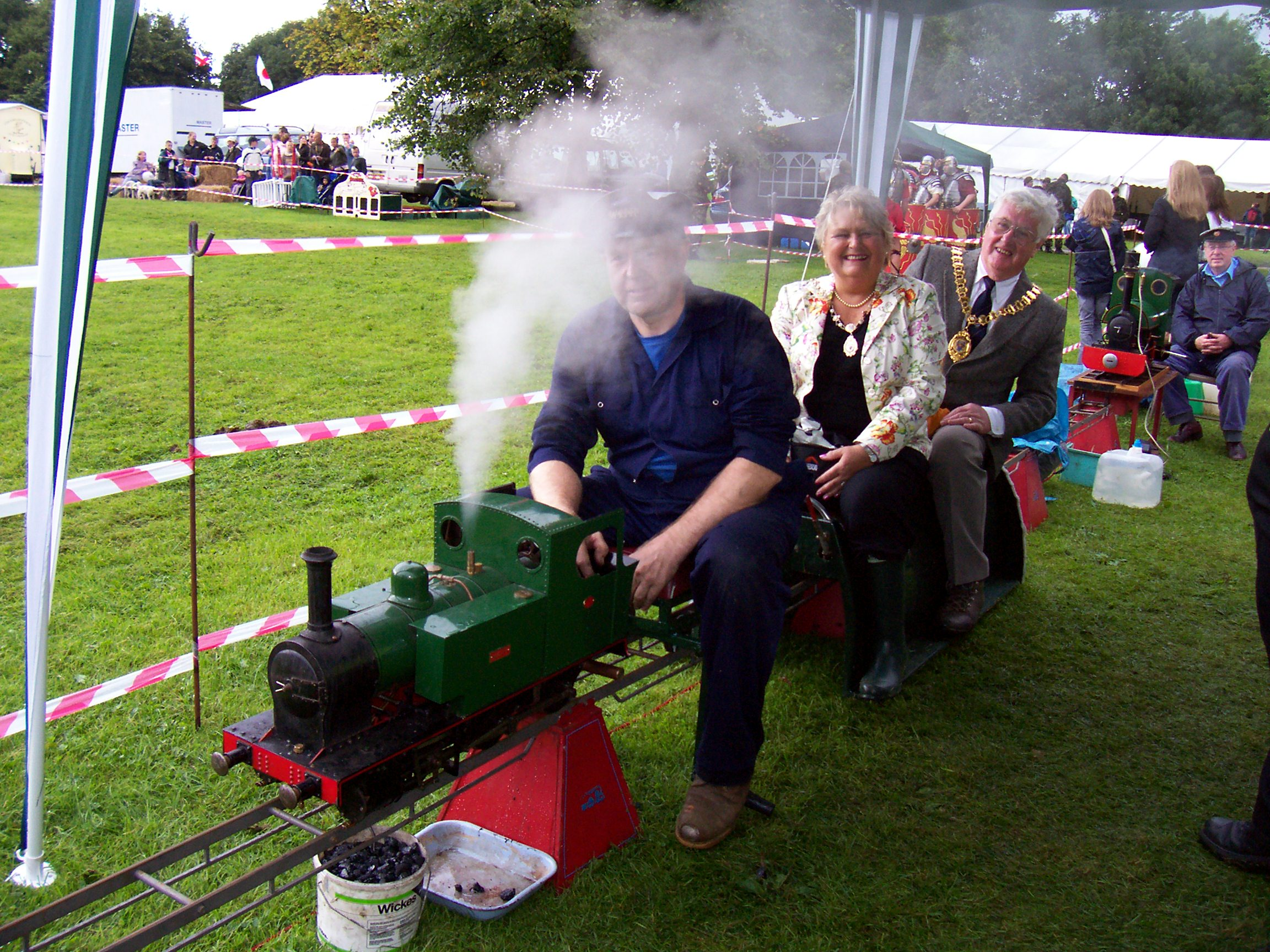
Mirfield Mayor rides Miniature Railway

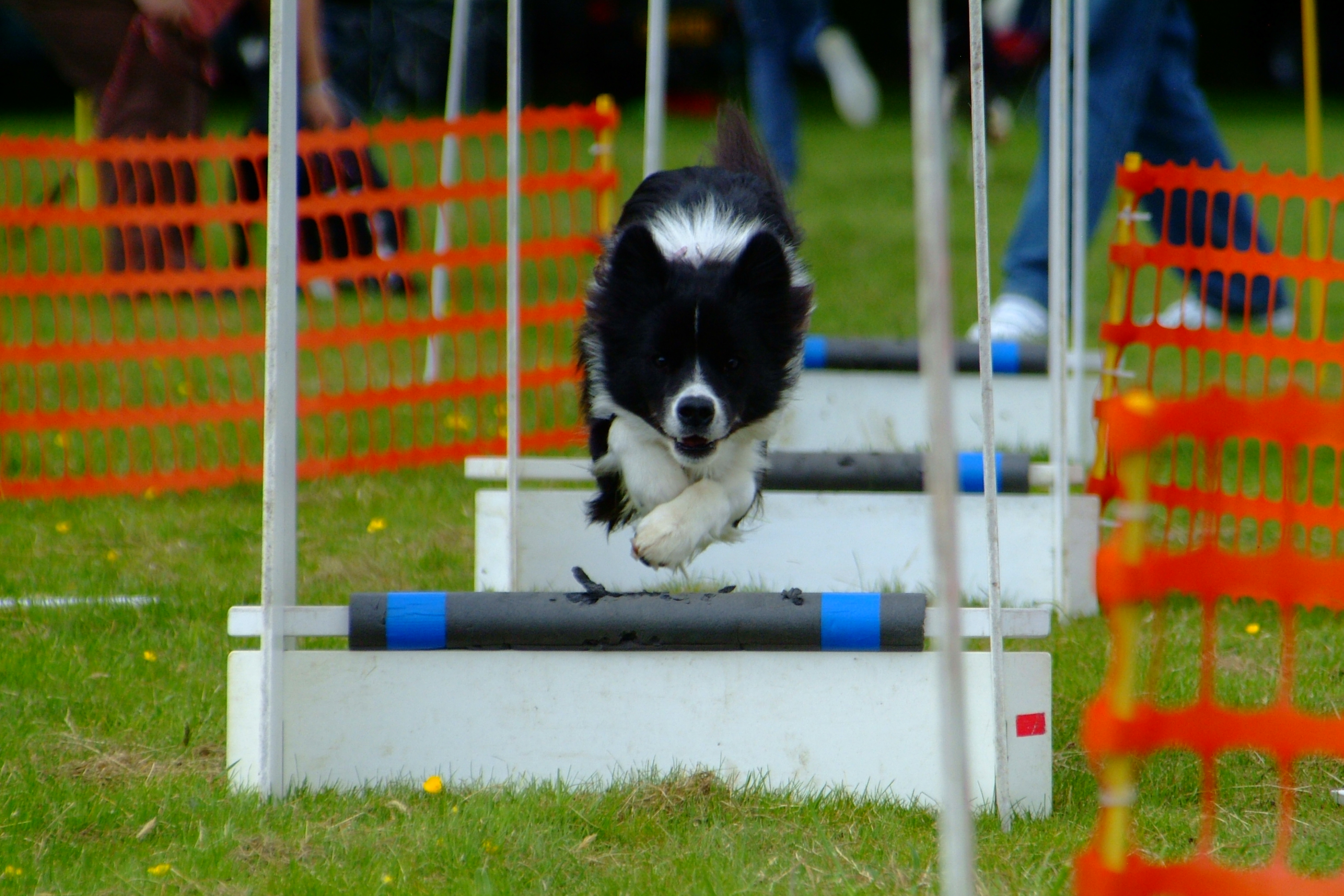
Dog Agility and Flyball

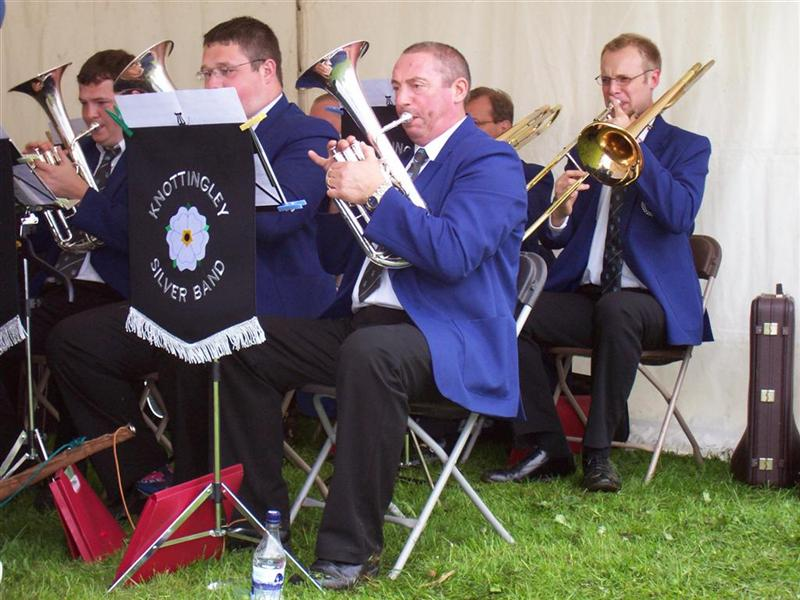
Knottingley Silver Band
