= Listed buildings in Mirfield =

Mirfield is a civil parish in the metropolitan borough of Kirklees, West Yorkshire, England. It contains 47 listed buildings that are recorded in the National Heritage List for England. Of these, two are listed at Grade II*, the middle of the three grades, and the others are at Grade II, the lowest grade. The list also includes two listed buildings outside the parish but in Mirfield ward; both of these are at Grade II. The parish contains the town of Mirfield and the surrounding area. Most of the listed buildings are houses and associated structures, cottages, farmhouses and farm buildings. The Calder and Hebble Navigation and the River Calder pass through the parish, and the listed buildings associated with them are two locks, two lock keeper's cottages, a road bridge, and two railway bridges. The other listed buildings include churches and items in or near churchyards, a railway underbridge, and a war memorial.

== Key ==
Grade	Criteria
II*	Particularly important buildings of more than special interest
II	Buildings of national importance and special interest

== Buildings ==
Name and location	Photograph	Date	Notes	Grade
Tower of Old Church of St Mary; 53.67967°N 1.68071°W		13th century	The lower part of the tower is the oldest, the upper parts dating from the 15th or 16th century. In the 19th century the embattled parapet was replaced with a pyramidal roof by George Gilbert Scott. The tower is in stone and has two stages, buttresses, a blocked arched west doorway, mullioned windows with paired arched lights in the lower stage, and two-light windows with Perpendicular tracery in the upper stage.	II
The Old Rectory; 53.67835°N 1.68381°W		Early 16th century (probable)	The rectory, later a private house, was modernised in the 20th century. There are two storeys, the ground floor is in stone that was replaced in the 20th century, the upper floor is timber framed, and the roof is in stone slate. There are four bays, in the ground floor is an doorway with a moulded surround and a Tudor arched head, and mullioned windows, and the upper floor contains mullioned and transomed casement windows. In the right gable end is a canted bay window, and the upper floor is jettied and contains a ten-light window. At the apex of the gable is a dated and initialled finial and pendant. At the rear are two later wings.	II*
Main barn, Hall Farm; 53.66217°N 1.70329°W	—	16th century (probable)	The barn is timber framed, and was encased in stone in the 19th century when it was extended at both ends. It has a stone slate roof, two aisles, and contains a square-headed cart entry flanked by outshuts. At the rear is a square entry with a gabled roof, and there is another outshut on the left.	II
Hopton Hall; 53.66231°N 1.70380°W		16th century	The house, which was altered in the 19th century, is in stone with timber framed gables and a stone slate roof. There are two storeys and an H-shaped plan. The central range has two bays, a double-depth plan, two doorways, and mullioned windows. The gable of the right wing has an ornamental bargeboard and a pendant finial. At the rear is a timber framed gable, and in the right front is a central gabled porch and gables with mullioned and transomed windows.	II
Barn east of Mock Hall; 53.68837°N 1.71865°W	—	16th century (probable)	The barn is timber framed, with infill and cladding in brick and stone. There are probably three bays, on the west is an outshut, and there are additions to the north.	II
Wellhouse Farmhouse and barn 53.68621°N 1.68775°W	—	1576	The barn to the right of the farmhouse was rebuilt in the 18th century incorporating the original timberwork. The buildings are in stone on a plinth, with quoins and a stone slate roof. The house has two storeys, and the right part has been incorporated into the barn, which is at right angles. There is a blocked doorway with a moulded surround and a four-centred arched triangular lintel inscribed with initials and the date. To the left are windows and a projection with a hipped roof. At the rear is a doorway with a quoined surround, a cambered head and a triangular lintel.	II
Barn southwest of Balderstone Hall; 53.68558°N 1.68192°W	—	17th century	The barn is in stone with quoins, and a stone slate roof with chamfered gable copings. There are four bays, and it contains a central square-headed cart entry, now blocked. At the rear is an outshut, also with a central square-headed cart entry.	II
Boat House; 53.66869°N 1.68085°W	—	17th century	A group of cottages and a barn, later converted for residential use, dating mainly from the 18th century, with two more cottages added in the 19th century. The earlier buildings are in stone with quoins, the 19th-century additions are in brick, and the roofs are of stone slate. The earlier parts have mullioned window, and in the brick cottages the windows are sashes.	II
Liley Hall; 53.65208°N 1.68981°W	—	17th century	A farmhouse that was extended and rebuilt in the 19th century, it is in stone, partly rendered, with quoins, and a stone slate roof with coped gables and a kneeler and finial on the east corner. There are two storeys and an H-shaped plan. In the ground floor is a narrow arched doorway, a mullioned window, and a window converted into a doorway, all under a hood mould. The other windows include sashes, mullioned windows, and a large 19th-century window.	II
Mock Hall; 53.68828°N 1.71913°W		17th century	A stone house with quoins, and a stone slate roof with coped gables. There are two storeys, three bays, a single-storey extension on the left, and a rear outshut. The doorway has a Tudor arched head, to the left is a twelve-light mullioned and transomed window, and the outer windows are mullioned, some with hood moulds.	II
Northorpe Hall; 53.68641°N 1.67801°W		17th century	The house was altered in the 19th century and later restored and used for other purposes. It is in stone with quoins, and a stone slate roof with hollow chamfered gable copings. There are two storeys and attics, three gabled bays, and a central rear wing. On the front is a two-storey gabled porch with a Tudor arched lintel, and an inner doorway with a moulded surround and an arched head. The windows in the left bay are large with two lights, in the porch is a mullion and transomed window, the two right bays contain four-light mullioned windows, and in the right two gables are blind two-light windows.	II
Former barn to Northorpe Hall; 53.68626°N 1.67837°W	—	17th century	The barn, later used for other purposes, is in stone with quoins, and a stone slate roof with chamfered gable copings on cut kneelers. There are outshuts on the front and rear, four bays and two aisles. On the front are two square-headed cart entries, and there is a partly blocked cart entry at the rear.	II
Sheep Ings Farmhouse and Barn; 53.66824°N 1.68614°W	—	17th century	The farmhouse and barn are timber framed, they are encased in brick with stone dressings, and have stone slate roofs. In the centre is the farmhouse with a single storey and attics, to the left is a two-storey extension, and to the right is the barn. The farmhouse has casement windows and dormers, and in the extension are sash windows. The barn is aisled, and it contains double doors.	II
Balderstone Hall; 53.68575°N 1.68162°W	—	1690 (possible)	The house was extended in the 19th century. It is in stone, rendered on the left side, and has a stone slate roof with gable copings on long cut kneelers. There are two storeys and an attic, a double-depth plan, a five-bay gabled front, and a later two-storey extension on the right. The central doorway has a moulded architrave and an ornamental lintel. The ground floor windows are sashes, in the upper floor are cross windows, and the attic contains a round-headed window.	II
Northorpe Croft; 53.68590°N 1.67838°W	—	1701	A detached house in rendered stone with a stone slate roof. There are two storeys, three bays, a continuous outshut at the rear, and a single-storey extension on the left. The central doorway has a moulded surround, and most of the windows are mullioned, with some mullions removed, and with traces of hood moulds.	II
Water Hall; 53.67384°N 1.69063°W	—	1719	The house was later extended, and was substantially altered in 1915. The main part is in stone with quoins, and a stone slate roof with gable copings on cut kneelers. There are two storeys and three bays, and a later extension on the left with an addition at its rear. In the centre is a doorway, and the windows are mullioned with four-lights in the ground floor and three lights in the upper floor. The extension is in brick in the ground floor and in stone above, and contains three-light windows. At the rear is a central doorway with a moulded surround and a dated and initialled Tudor arched deep lintel, and this is flanked by two-storey canted bay windows with a parapet.	II
Over Hall; 53.68259°N 1.68793°W	—	1721	A detached house with an earlier origin, it was altered in the 19th century. The house is in stone with rusticated quoins, and a slate roof with gable copings on moulded kneelers. There are two storeys and an entrance front of three gabled bays. On the front is a porch and sash windows, in the ground floor they are tripartite with cornices, in the upper floor they have single lights, the middle window with a cornice. The garden front has four bays, and contains a sundial with an iron gnomon and a painted face with initials and a date.	II
Wall, gates and gate piers, Balderstone Hall; 53.68561°N 1.68161°W	—	Early to mid 18th century	The garden wall is in stone with copings, and the stone gate piers are rusticated with ball and stalk finials. The cast iron gates date from the 19th century and have fleur-de-lys finials.	II
Tablet on church tower 53.67970°N 1.68072°W	—	1745	The tablet is fixed to the tower of the Old Church of St Mary. It is a stone slab inscribed with the names and details of benefactors to the church, and under it are the names of the churchwardens, now illegible.	II
Broad Oaks; 53.66915°N 1.67930°W		Mid 18th century	A house, to which a cottage was added on the right later in the century, and a barn to the left in about 1800. The house and barn are in stone with quoins, the cottage is in brick, and the roofs are in stone slate. The house has a central doorway and staircase window, and the other windows are sashes. The barn has segmental-arched cart entries on the front and the rear, windows on the front and doorways at the rear. On the house is a stone porch with a moulded surround and an ornamental lintel.	II
Ivy Lodge; 53.67982°N 1.68575°W		18th century	The oldest part is the left wing, most of the house dating from the 19th century. It is in stone, partly rendered, with quoins, moulded gutter brackets, and a stone slate roof. There are two storeys, a three-bay main range, a left cross-wing, and a continuous rear outshut. The doorway is in the centre of the main range, and the windows are sashes.	II
Thorpe Cottage; 53.68014°N 1.69780°W	—	18th century (possible)	The cottage, said at one time to have been a school, is in stone with quoins, a stone slate roof, and one storey. On the front is a 19th-century porch with a re-set dated lintel and an inscribed plaque. The windows are modern, including a bay window, and at the rear is an extension.	II
House southeast of 115 Huddersfield Road; 53.67538°N 1.69851°W	—	1769	The house is in stone with quoins and a stone slate roof. There are two storeys, a continuous outshut at the rear, and a lean-to extension on the left. The doorway has a dated lintel and the windows are mullioned.	II
Cottage to rear of Broad Oaks; 53.66907°N 1.67914°W	—	Late 18th century	The house is in brick with a stone slate roof, and has two storeys and an attic. The doorway is in the centre, and is flanked by three-light mullioned windows in both floors.	II
126 and 124 Hopton Lane and barn 53.66603°N 1.70517°W	—	Late 18th century	The older house is No. 126, with No. 124 dating from the 19th century. The buildings are in stone with quoins, stone slate roofs, two storeys, and mullioned windows. No. 126 has three bays and a rear gabled wing, No. 124 is recessed and has one bay, and the attached barn contains a segmental-arched cart entry.	II
Former lock-keeper's cottage, Newgate Bridge; 53.67342°N 1.69667°W		Late 18th century	The former lock-keeper's cottage is to the north of the flood lock at the entrance to the Calder and Hebble Navigation. It is in stone with quoins and a stone slate roof. There are two storeys, one bay, and two-light mullioned windows.	II
Flood lock, Newgate Bridge; 53.67316°N 1.69653°W		c. 1776	The lock at the entrance to the Calder and Hebble Navigation from the River Calder has stone sides with copings. There are two pairs of wooden gates, and there is no wall on the south side of the basin.	II
Double lock, Shepley Bridge; 53.67434°N 1.67558°W		c. 1776	The double locks on the Calder and Hebble Navigation have stone sides with copings, and some repairs in brick. There are three pairs of lock gates.	II
Ledgard Bridge; 53.67191°N 1.69745°W		1799–1800	The bridge carries a road over the River Calder. It is in stone, and consists of four semicircular arches with triangular cutwaters, and a cambered carriageway. There are square corbels at the springing of each arch, a parapet on a string course on the south side, and a concrete deck for a footpath on the north.	II
Range of barns, Balderstone Hall; 53.68585°N 1.68187°W	—	Late 18th or early 19th century	The barns are in stone with quoins, a stone slate roof, two storeys, and a continuous outshut at the rear. The openings include two-light windows, a doorway, a loading door, and an elliptical-headed cart entry.	II
Walls, Broad Oaks; 53.66916°N 1.67899°W	—	Late 18th or early 19th century	The walls enclose the courtyard of the house on the east and south sides. They are in stone with flat coping and are ramped at intervals on the east side. In the corner is an arched entrance.	II
22–34 North Gate, Upper Hopton; 53.66624°N 1.71432°W		Early 19th century	A terrace of stone houses with a stone slate roof and two storeys. Each cottage has a doorway, and most windows are mullioned with two or three lights.	II
Cottage, Shepley Bridge Locks; 53.67440°N 1.67587°W	—	Early 19th century	The cottage adjacent to the lock on the Calder and Hebble Navigation was probably originally the lock keeper's house. It is in stone with a hipped stone slate roof and one storey. The cottage contains a central doorway and single-light windows.	II
Hopton Congregational Church; 53.66923°N 1.69687°W		1829	The church is in stone with a slate roof and two storeys. The front has five bays, the middle three bays projecting under a pedimented gable. In the centre is a three-bay Doric distyle in antis portico with a dated frieze, and double doors with fanlights. The ground floor windows have flat heads and those in the upper floor have round heads; some are sashes, and others are blind. At the rear is a wing of two storeys and five bays, and behind that is a cross-wing of one storey and five bays.	II*
Railway underbridge 53.67094°N 1.68890°W	—	1836–39	The bridge was built by the Manchester and Leeds Railway to carry its line over Hirst Lane, and was later widened by the Lancashire and Yorkshire Railway. It is in gritstone, and consists of a single segmental arch with voussoirs on impost bands. The spandrels and abutments are supported by canted buttresses, and there are curved wing walls ending in piers with pyramidal caps.	II
Railway viaduct (Wheatley's Bridge); 53.67070°N 1.67781°W		1836–39	The bridge was built by the Manchester and Leeds Railway to carry its line over the River Calder, and was widened in 1884 by the Lancashire and Yorkshire Railway. It is in gritstone and blue engineering brick, and consists of five segmental skew arches. At the west end are curved and canted wing walls, ending in low piers with capstones. The eastern end splays slightly.	II
Railway bridge over River Calder; 53.67246°N 1.69772°W		c. 1840	The bridge was built by the Manchester and Leeds Railway to carry its line over the River Calder. It is in stone with rusticated dressings, and consists of four segmental arches over the river, and five further arches to the west and two to the east, all on bull-nosed abutments. There is a string course at the base of the parapet.	II
St John's Church, Upper Hopton; 53.66286°N 1.70313°W		1846	The church, designed by Ignatius Bonomi and Cory in Perpendicular style, is built in stone with a stone slate roof. It consists of a nave, a north aisle, a south porch, a chancel with a north vestry, and a west tower. The tower has three stages, diagonal buttresses, a stair tower on the north, an embattled parapet with gargoyles, and a pyramidal roof with a weather cock. The west window has three lights, and the east window has four.	II
Grave slab 53.67953°N 1.67965°W		c. 1847	The grave slab is in the churchyard of St Mary's Church, and is to the memory of members of the Wraith family. It consists of a stone slab on a plinth, with an inscription referring to the murder of a couple from the family who were murdered in 1847.	II
Stocks; 53.67937°N 1.68080°W		19th century (possible)	The stocks are near the south entrance to the churchyard of St Mary's Church. They consist of two stone posts with slotted sides and rounded tops, between which are later wooden rails.	II
St Mary's Church; 53.67983°N 1.68132°W		1871	The church was designed by George Gilbert Scott in Early English style to replace an earlier church, and is built in stone with a stone slate roof. It consists of a nave with a clerestory, lean-to north and south aisles, a gabled south porch, a chancel with a south chapel and a north vestry, and a west tower. The tower is square, with four stages, diagonal buttresses that rise to become octagonal and surmounted by pinnacles with spires, and a plain parapet on a corbel table. The double west doorway is elaborate with a central colonnette, diapering in the tympana and a roundel with carved figures.	II*
Wall, railings, gates and gate piers, St Mary's Church; 53.67946°N 1.68134°W	—	1871 (probable)	A dwarf wall with iron railings encloses the south and west sides of the churchyard. There are two pairs of iron gates with stone gate piers. The piers are square with buttresses and gabled caps, those in front of the west door have ornamental wrought iron lamp brackets.	II
Boundary stone, Huddersfield Road; 53.69644°N 1.69907°W		Late 19th century	The boundary stone is on the southeast side of Huddersfield Road (A62 road), and marks the boundary between the parishes of Mirfield and Liversedge. It consists of a stone with a rounded top, inscribed with "WRCC" at the top, and lower with the names of the parishes.	II
Wall, railings and gatepiers, Trinity Methodist Church; 53.67406°N 1.69177°W	—	c. 1877	The forecourt of the church is enclosed by dwarf stone coped walls and bulbous cast iron railings with ornamental finials and dog bars. The square stone gate piers have pyramidal caps.	II
St Paul's Church, East Thorpe; 53.67342°N 1.69551°W		1881	The church, designed by W. Swinden Barber in Decorated style, is built in stone with slate roofs. It consists of a nave, north and south aisles with separately pitched roofs, a lean-to south porch, a chancel with north and south chapels, and a tower on the north side. The tower is square with four stages, lancet windows, and a saddleback roof, and a stair tower, also with a saddleback roof. The east window has seven lights.	II
Holmedene; 53.68385°N 1.69314°W	—	1889	A large detached house in stone on a chamfered plinth, with a ground floor impost band, a first floor sill band, a bracketed eaves cornice, and a hipped Welsh slate roof. There are two storeys and a symmetrical front of three bays. In the centre is a projecting porch with fluted Doric columns, an entablature and an open balustrade, and above it is a sash window with a moulded lintel. The outer bays contain two-storey canted bay windows, with Doric pilasters in the ground floor, and the upper windows have segmental heads with keystones. On the sides are sash windows with segmental heads and keystones.	II
Church of the College of the Resurrection; 53.68270°N 1.71372°W		1911	The church was designed by Walter Tapper in Romanesque style, the first phase was completed in 1924, and the church was finished between 1936 and 1938 by his son Michael. The original part is built in sandstone, the later part is in red brick, and the roof is clad in copper. The church consists of a nave with a clerestory, lean-to north and south aisles, and a chancel also with aisles; the chancel and the chancel aisles all have apsidal ends. The bays of the nave are divided by brick pilaster strips, there are recessed rendered panels between them, and an oculus in each bay in the clerestory. At the west end is a large round-arched opening containing an oculus, flanked by square towers rising to octagonal bell towers with pyramidal roofs.	II
Gate piers and gates, Water Hall; 53.67414°N 1.69066°W	—	1915 (probable)	The gates and gate piers are in Arts and Crafts style. The piers are in stone, square and each has a swept cap and an elliptical finial. The gates are in iron with bars and rails forming a grid with a superimposed elliptical motif.	II
Mirfield war memorial 53.67533°N 1.69546°W		1921	The war memorial is in Ings Grove Park, and consists of a carved limestone cross. The cross has a tapered shaft with carved decoration on the front and sides, and it stands on a rectangular base with shaped sides and inscriptions on the front and rear. Behind the cross is a curved screen wall in red brick with sandstone dressings and four rusticated piers. Between the piers are bronze plaques with the names of those lost in the two World Wars.	II
