= Talha Asmal =

British suicide bomber

- Born: 1998; Dewsbury, West Yorkshire, England
- Died: June 2015 (aged 16–17); South of Baiji, Iraq
- Other name: Abu Yusuf Al-Bratani
- Known for: Youngest suicide bomber in British history

Talha Asmal was a British teenager from Dewsbury, West Yorkshire who travelled with his neighbour to Syria to join the Islamic State of Iraq and the Levant in March 2015. A few months later, in June, he became the youngest suicide bomber in British history. He was seventeen at the time of his death.

== Disappearance ==
Asmal and his best friend and neighbour were nine months apart in age and lived next door to each other in Dewsbury, West Yorkshire, England, in a Muslim majority neighbourhood, Savile Town. Both of their families were of Gujarati origin. Both worshipped at a nearby mosque which had been founded by the neighbour's grandfather. Asmal was studying for his A-levels at Mirfield Free Grammar and Sixth Form. His former principal described him as a "conscientious student" who did not draw attention to himself.

On March 31, 2015, Asmal and his neighbour took a flight to Turkey. They were both seventeen years old when they left. In early April, the British media reported the boys were missing and feared to have traveled to Syria in to join ISIL. Both their families issued a statement, appealing for anyone with information to contact the police. They described their sons as "just two ordinary Yorkshire lads" with promising futures and said they were profoundly shocked and wanted them back home.

Their trip to the Middle East in 2015 was not the first time Asmal and his next-door neighbour had been exposed to terrorism. Asmal's neighbour's older brother was arrested in 2006 at the age of sixteen, and accused, along with two men in their twenties, of participating in a terrorist plot to kill non-Muslims including the British Royal Family. The neighbour's brother was convicted of making a record of information likely to be used for terrorist purposes. The judge sentenced him to two years in a young offenders institution, saying, "There is no doubt you knew what you were doing." The judge acknowledged, however, that the two older offenders took advantage of the teenager's "youthful naivety". The two older offenders in that case were sentenced to ten years and twelve years in prison. By the time this man's younger brother left the United Kingdom with Asmal, seven years had passed since the sentencing and the older brother was twenty-five years old, out of custody and living at home with his family, next door to Asmal.

== Death in ISIL ==
In June 2015, Asmal participated in a suicide attack in Iraq, detonating a vehicle fitted with explosives. He was part of a team of suicide bombers who targeted forces near an oil refinery south of Baiji. At least eleven people were reported to have been killed in the attack.

Social media posts and ISIL itself identified Asmal as one of the bombers, using his nom de guerre Abu Yusuf Al-Bratani. The other three bombers were said to be a German, a Kuwaiti and a Palestinian. ISIL published photos of Asmal taken right before the attack, images which his parents identified. In the images, he is shown smiling. Shahid Malik, who is a friend of the Asmal family, called the images "disturbing."

When word of Asmal's death reached his neighbourhood in Dewsbury, many neighbours were grief-stricken. Asmal's family said they were "utterly devastated and heartbroken". His parents suggested Asmal had been radicalized online and stated they believed their son had been groomed and exploited by jihadists, whom they said deliberately targeted him in his "tender years and naivety". They urged others who feared their relatives might be becoming radicalized to contact the authorities.

At the time of Asmal's death, the whereabouts of the neighbour boy who accompanied him to Syria were unknown. A neighbour in Dewsbury said he'd heard the two teenagers parted ways shortly after reaching ISIL in the Middle East.

== See also ==
- Ifthekar Jaman
- Ahmed, Salma and Zahra Halane
- Aqsa Mahmood
- Abdul Waheed Majeed
- Kalaivani Rajaratnam
