= St Mary's Church, Mirfield =

Church in West Yorkshire, England

Coordinates: 53.67965°N 1.68164°W

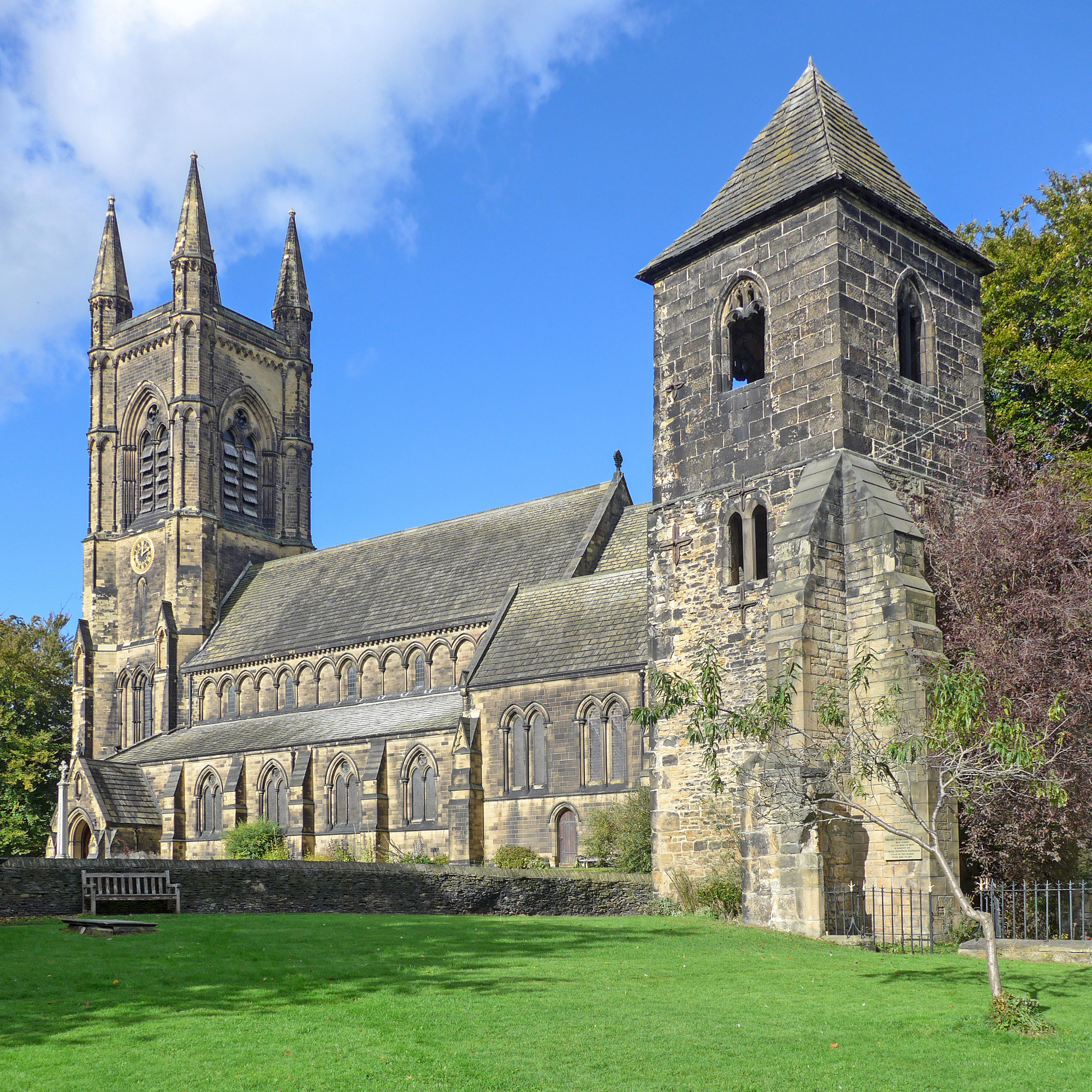
- The old and new churches sit side by side

- Location in West Yorkshire
- OS grid reference: SE 21148 20413
- Location: Mirfield, West Yorkshire
- Denomination: Church of England

History
- Dedication: Mary, Mother of Jesus
- Consecrated: 12 October 1871

Architecture
- Heritage designation: Grade II*
- Designated: 14 March 1966
- Architect: George Gilbert Scott
- Style: Gothic Revival
- Years built: 1869–1871
- Construction cost: £30,000 (1871)

Administration
- Province: York
- Diocese: Leeds
- Archdeaconry: Halifax
- Deanery: Dewsbury and Birstall
- Parish: Mirfield Team Parish

St Mary's Church is the parish church of the town of Mirfield in West Yorkshire, England. The current building is a large Gothic Revival structure designed by Sir George Gilbert Scott, replacing an older structure, the tower of which still survives a short distance from the present building. These structures form Mirfield's most prominent landmark and both are listed for preservation by Historic England, the old church tower as Grade II and the present building as Grade II*.

The church is notable for its Victorian architecture, medieval remains and a surviving 11th-century motte-and-bailey castle mound located within the grounds. The church has been on the Heritage at Risk Register since 2013 due to substantial works required to repair the building.

== History ==
=== Medieval church ===
The first parish church at Mirfield is believed to have been built in the late 13th century; until that time residents of Mirfield had to travel to Dewsbury to worship. Little is known about this early building, as the only surviving remains are the lower part of the old church tower, however the upper part of the old tower is clearly later, featuring Perpendicular tracery, which implies the tower was heightened in the 15th or 16th centuries. This church replaced an earlier chapel located within the nearby castle.

=== Second church (1826–1871) ===
By 1826, the parish had a population of more than 5,000 souls and the medieval church was too small for a growing industrial town, so the body of the church was demolished and rebuilt, the new church adjoining the old tower. A 13th-century pillar from the medieval church was saved from demolition and preserved in the vicarage garden. The architect of this church is unknown, but surviving photos indicate it was a short, wide structure of six bays in the Georgian style.

=== Present church (1871–present) ===
==== Construction and consecration ====
This second church did not last until even the end of the century, because in 1865, money began to be raised for its replacement. Distinguished architect Sir George Gilbert Scott designed the replacement and the foundation stone was laid on Easter Monday, 1869. The construction of the church was overseen by Messrs. W. & J. Milner of Mirfield; the old church continued to be used whilst the new was under construction.

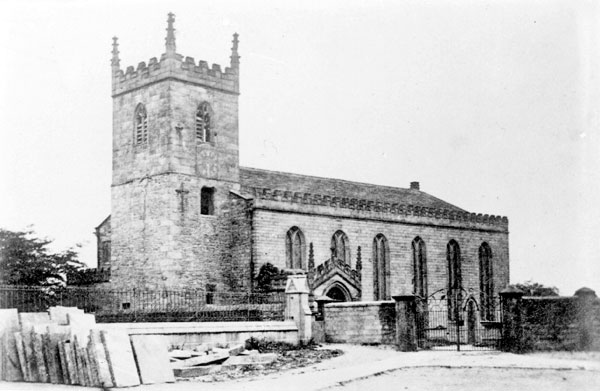
The second church sometime before demolition

Construction began on a site slightly to the north-west of the 1826 church and progressed rapidly. Funds were provided for the construction both by public subscription and private donation; the family of Joseph Lee gave £3,000 for construction of the tower and the family of Joshua Ingram gave £5,500 for its completion. The total cost of the new building, including furnishings, exceeded £30,000 (equivalent to £3.6 million in 2020). During construction, the preserved pillar in the vicarage garden was included within the choir vestry of the new church by Scott. An inscription on the pillar makes reference to this.

The new church, constructed on a far larger scale than either of the previous two churches, was consecrated on 12 October 1871, by Robert Bickersteth, Bishop of Ripon. It had originally been proposed to demolish the entirety of the old church but Scott suggested retaining the medieval tower due to its age, and this proposal was accepted. The old church was demolished, save for the tower, in 1873. Scott made a minor alteration to the old tower, replacing the late Georgian battlements and pinnacles installed in 1826 with a slate-covered pyramidal roof. Stone from the old church was used for construction of Eastthorpe School.

==== Modern restoration ====
In 2012, a major restoration project was launched to restore the tower and church which were in great need of repair. The first phase of repairs, undertaken between 2013 and 2016, included shrouding the tower in scaffolding, and using this to conduct extensive masonry repair, refurbishment of the clock faces, recasting and retuning of the bells, roof replacement, new oak louvres and repairs to the pinnacles. The cost of phase one was £253,000, funded by a £181,000 grant from the Heritage Lottery Fund, £10,000 from the National Churches Trust and the rest raised by the local congregation and volunteers. Further repairs are needed in phase two to repair weather damage and weatherproof the rest of the building before it can be removed from the Heritage at Risk Register.

== Architecture ==
=== Old Tower ===
The old church tower, preserved by Scott, is a three-storey structure, formed of an early Gothic base, later Perpendicular upper section, and topped by a 19th-century Gothic Revival pyramidal roof. The lower stage has large corner buttresses and pairs of traceried lancets, the mullions of which are likely 19th-century. The upper stage is formed of larger single openings with 15th- or 16th-century tracery. The original roof line from the 1826 church is still visible etched in the eastern face of the tower.

=== St Mary's Church ===
==== Exterior ====
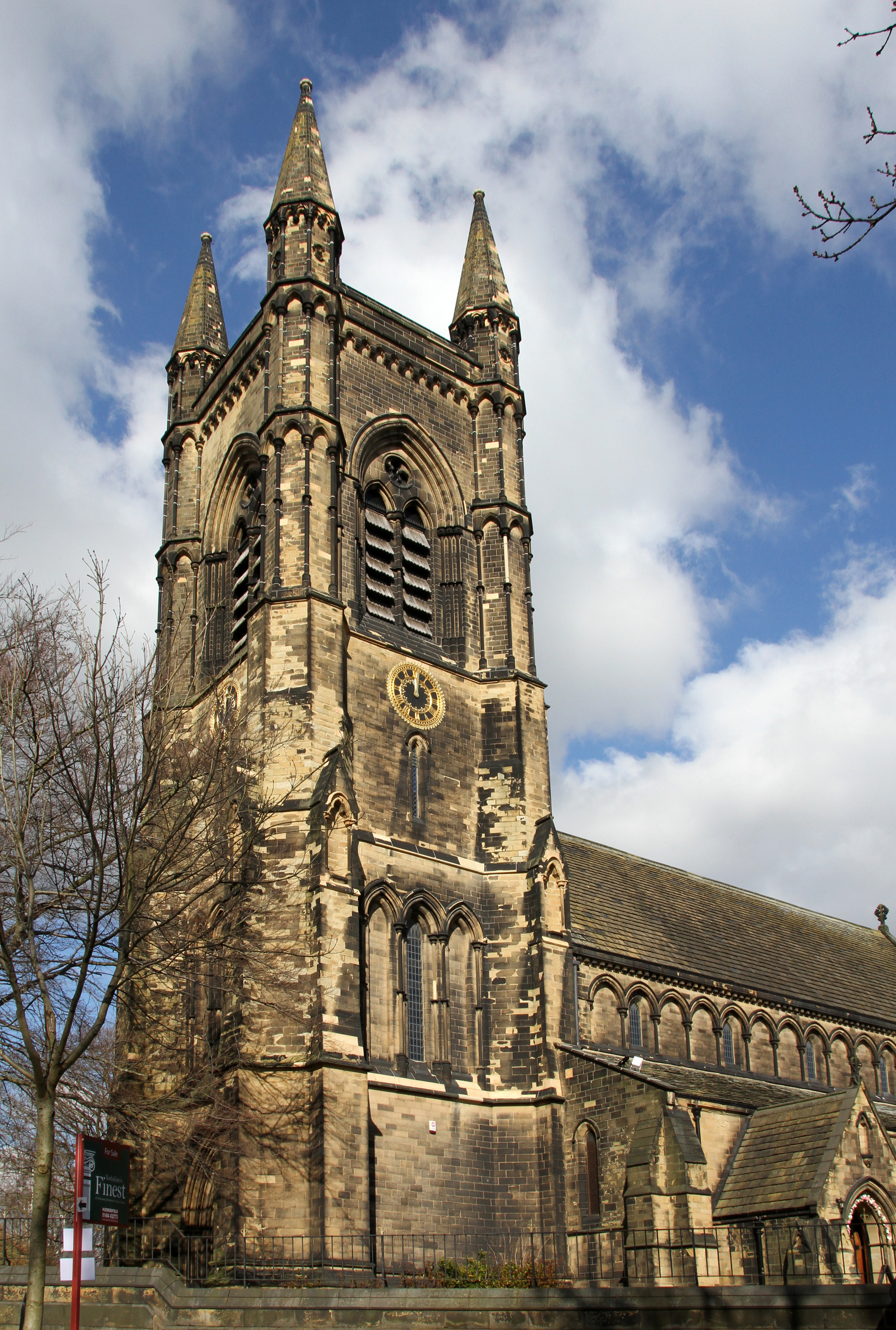
The massive west tower

The present church building is on a far larger and grander scale than the old, for even the nave walls of the present building exceed the height of the old tower. The church building is now formed of a large west tower adjoining a five-bay nave with north and south aisles, a south porch and a three-bay chancel, also with north and south aisles. A two-bay vestry adjoins the northern choir aisle. The footprint of the church is 1,014 square metres (10,910 sq ft), which according to the Church of England, makes it a "very large" parish church. The building is designed in the Gothic Revival style, with Early English Gothic influences.

The principal feature externally is the lofty and broad west tower, formed of four stages with very large louvred bell openings on the uppermost stage. The tower is nearly 30 feet (9.1 m) square at the base and is 139 feet (42 m) high to the top of the pinnacles. There are diagonal buttresses to lower two stages which become octagonal buttresses to upper two stages and terminate in large pinnacles with spires.

The nave aisles have simple 2-light windows with plate tracery and a quatrefoil in each apex. The clerestory above it is similar in form to a blind gothic arcade, with groups of three blind arches, a small lancet window illuminating the central arch in each group. The chancel and aisles have larger, paired lancets and the east window consists of three tall lancets with a quatrefoil roundel in the gable end. There is a large single lancet in all but the eastern face of the tower.

==== Interior ====
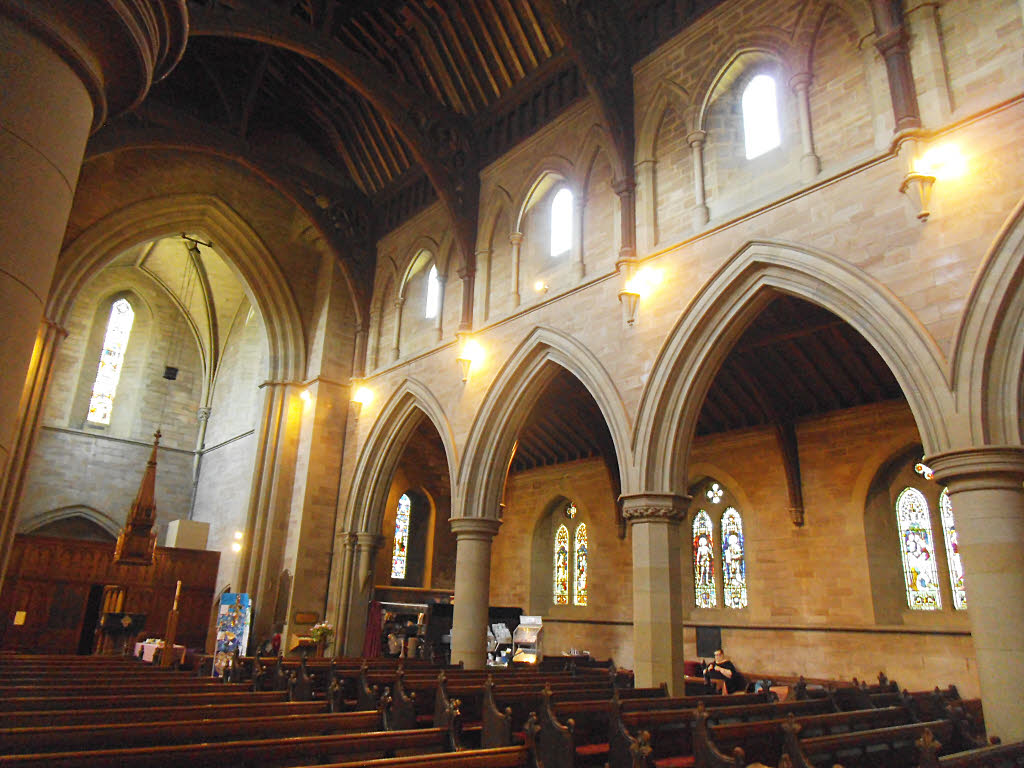
The nave, looking west

The interior is broad, high and light. The principal entrance in the south porch leads into the nave, formed of five bays. The arcade to the north and south aisles alternate between round piers with plain capitals and octagonal piers with foliated capitals; each arch has extensive moulding. Large arches into the chancel and into the tower. Vaulted ceiling to tower, ribs forming centre circle. Chancel of two bays internally, with black marble colonettes around central columns. Elaborate oak panelling to the left side of the chancel; sedilia and piscina to the right. East window lancets memorial to Ingram family, manufactured by Burlison and Grylls in 1882. The nave and chancel have a fine and elaborate arch-braced collar beam roof.

===== Fittings =====
The church has a variety of fittings, including Victorian choir stalls, two fonts, an alabaster reredos and oak pulpit. The pulpit, made of carved oak on a stone base, depicts John the Baptist, Paul and Augustine of Canterbury. There are two fonts; an older 17th-century one in the south aisle and a newer 19th-century font near the tower arch, made from red and black marble, above which hangs a spectacular spire-shaped carved oak font cover dating from 1931.

The reredos, which spans the entire length of the chancel gable end, takes the shape of a gothic arcade and depicts the Crucifixion in the centre panel with Salviati mosaics depicting angels on the outer panels. The Lady Chapel houses an ancient object. called the 'Mirfield stone', a grave monument believed to date from the 10th or 11th century. Made from brown sandstone, it is 30.5 inches (77 cm) high and 11 inches (28 cm) long.

==== Building materials ====
Externally, the church is constructed from ashlar quarried from nearby Huddersfield, with slate roofs throughout except atop the tower, which is lead. The interior is also made mostly from ashlar, although this is lighter in colour than the external stone. Oak is used for the roof, pulpit, screen and font cover. Marble is also used in several places in the church, including as colonettes in the chancel and the fonts. The reredos is manufactured from alabaster, with spar from Derbyshire used for decoration and Cornish spar for the shafts.

==== Dimensions ====
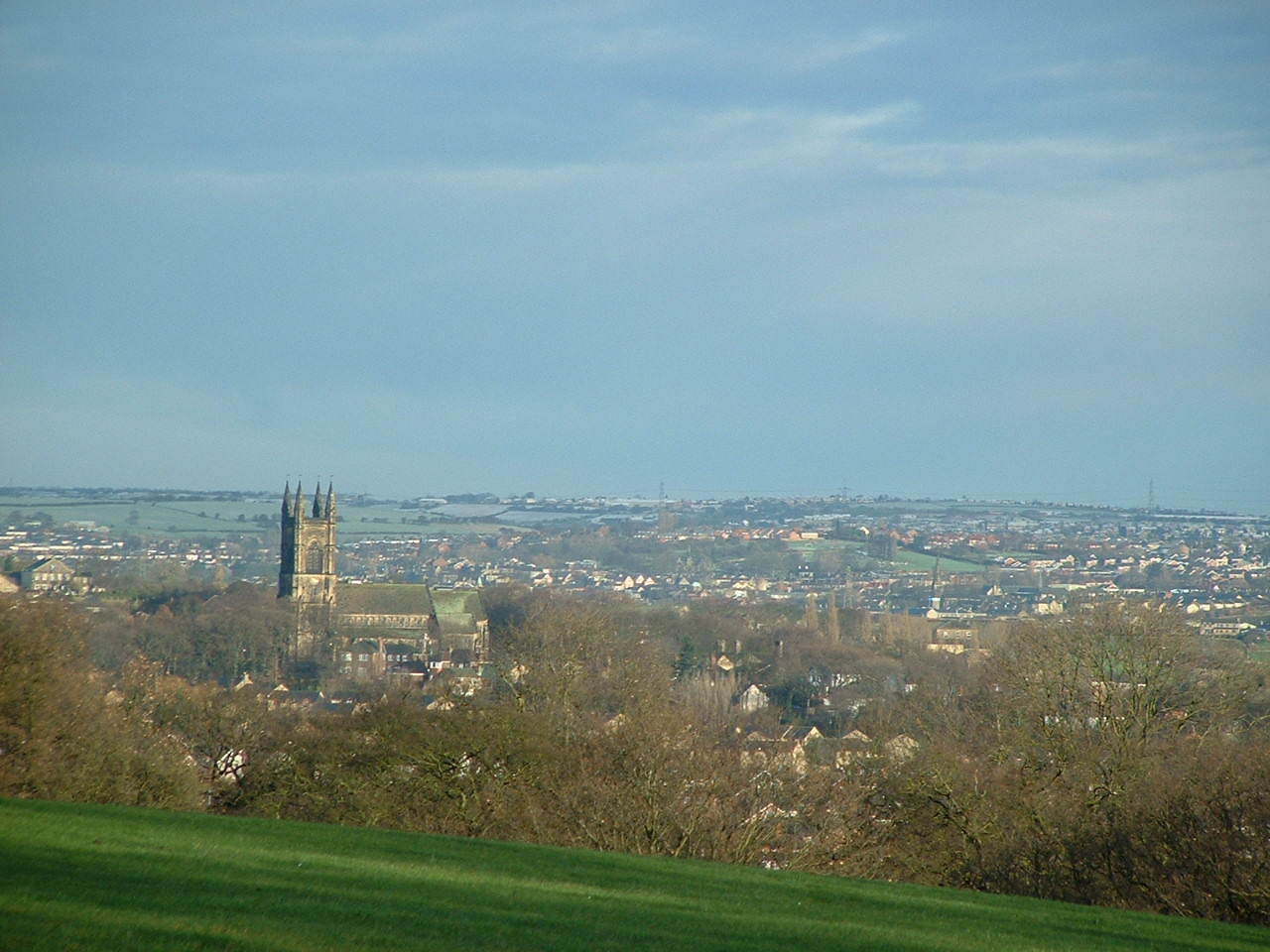
View over Mirfield, showing the church dominating the landscape

- Overall length: 157 feet (48 m)
- Length of nave: 87 feet (27 m)
- Width of central nave: 27 feet (8.2 m)
- Height of nave roof: 64 feet (20 m)
- Length of chancel: 40 feet (12 m)
- Width of chancel: 27 feet (8.2 m)
- Height of tower: 139 feet (42 m)
- Footprint: 1,014 square metres (10,910 sq ft)

== Organ ==
The first organ provided for the new church was a small instrument provided by F. Jardine of Manchester in 1872, rebuilt in 1883 and again in 1891. This instrument was evidently insufficient for it was replaced entirely in 1924 with a new three-manual instrument by J. W. Walker & Sons of London at a cost of £3,500. The Walker instrument was designed in consultation Dr. Tysoe, organist of Leeds Parish Church (now Leeds Minster), and contained some of the finer pipework from the previous organ. It was opened by Dr. Tysoe on 19 October 1926 and contained 39 speaking stops.

This organ still forms the core of the present instrument but has received overhauls, enlargements and repairs multiple times. Firstly, in 1946, Walker & Sons returned to overhaul the instrument and make provision for a larger 16ft Contra Gamba but this pipe was never added. A more major overhaul took place in 1963, again by Walker & Sons, who dismantled and rebuilt the instrument with new second-hand pipes in the pedal section.

A second significant overhaul was required in 1980s due to rain water penetrating the instrument following a series of robberies in which lead was stripped from the roof; this led to a majority of the instrument being unplayable. This overhaul, taking place in 1986, cost over £24,000 and involved replacing the piston system, tonal adjustments and additional stops. The instrument now has 48 speaking stops, 11 couplers and 3 manuals. It is located in the north choir aisle.

== Bells ==
=== Old church ===
The former church at Mirfield contained a ring of six bells, cast by a variety of founders between 1725 and 1852, with a tenor weighing 16 and three quarter hundredweight (850 kg), cast by Charles & George Mears of Whitechapel Bell Foundry. When the present building was opened, these bells were transferred to St Michael & All Angels, Thornhill, West Yorkshire. Thornhill replaced these bells in 1980 with another second hand ring, a peal of eight cast by Charles Carr of Smethwick in 1910, originally hung at St Paul's Church, Todmorden. Only one of the bells from Mirfield's old church still survive; the treble, cast by Daniel Hedderly of Lincoln in 1725 was purchased to augment the ring of five at Cropwell Bishop, Nottinghamshire; the other five were scrapped in 1980.

=== Current church ===
During construction of the present church, a heavy peal of ten bells was cast by John Taylor & Co of Loughborough in 1869, installed in October 1870 when the tower was high enough to house them. At the time of casting, the bell foundry was overseen by Lord Grimthorpe, and much experimentation in the shapes and tuning of bells happened under his auspices. This ring of ten, with a tenor of 30 and a half long hundredweight (1,550 kg) were first rung on 15 July 1871. Though initially thought of as a good peal of bells, analysis of their tuning made in 1983 revealed the bells to be significantly out of tune.

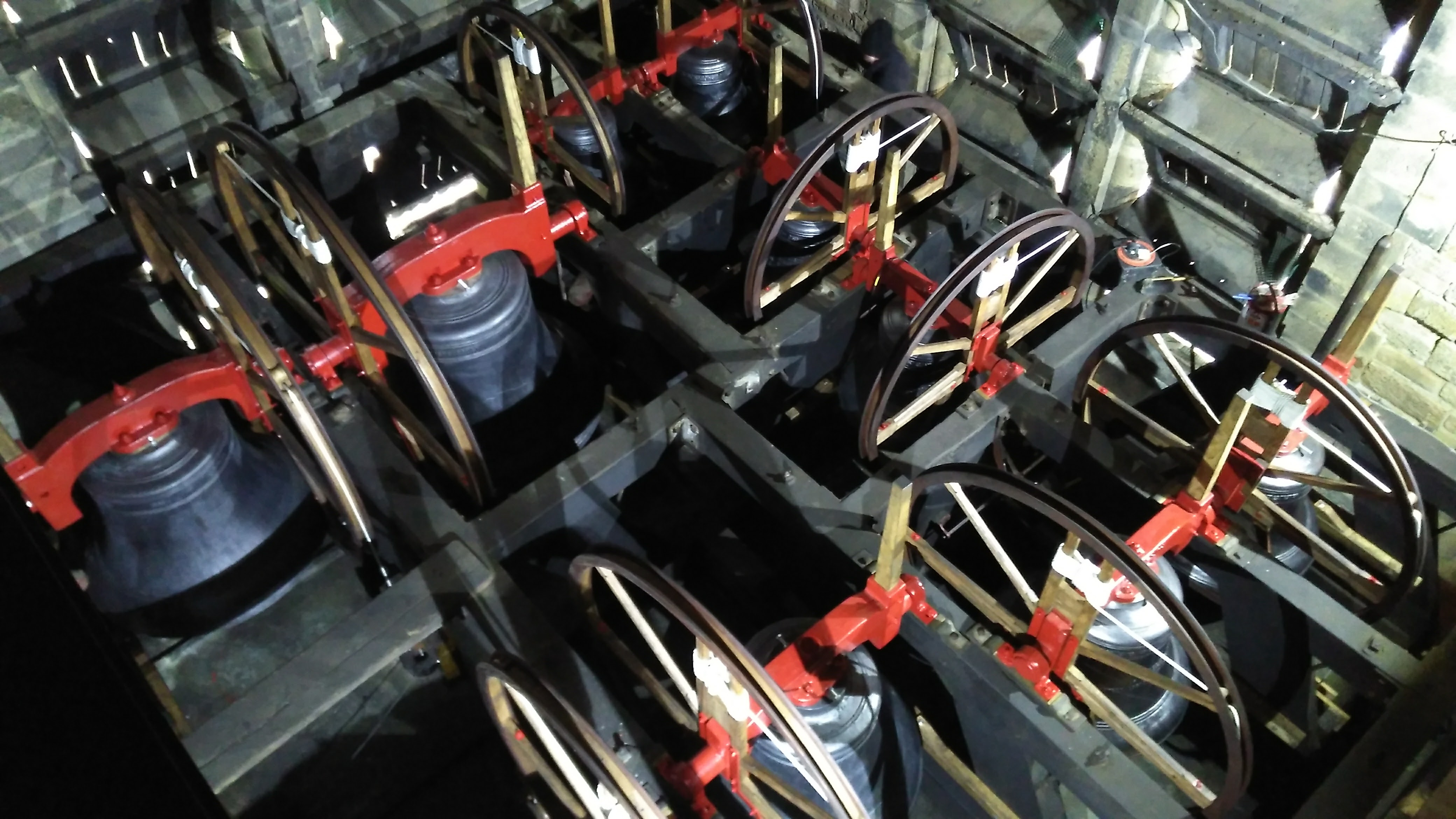
The restored ring of ten from above

The bells have been overhauled several times since their installation; firstly in 1934 by John Taylor & Co, who replaced the plain bearings with ball bearings, overhauled and repaired the fittings and strengthened the frame at a cost of £238. A second overhaul took place in 1983, also by Taylor's, following an inspection report earlier that year, who reported that "tonally, the bells leave a great deal to be desired". They proposed a full restoration involving retuning and rehanging the bells at a cost of £7,560; this was not acted upon. Instead, the treble and 4th bells were brought to their works, were retuned and rehung on new metal headstocks; the other 8 bells remained untouched on their 1869 wooden headstocks.

In 2012, as part of the launch of the project to restore the tower, the opportunity was taken to fundraise for a full restoration of the bells, as the condition of the ring was deteriorating. An £89,000 restoration project was launched to restore the bells and following three years of fundraising, the bells were rung for the last time on Easter Sunday, 2015. The original plan was to recast the lightest six bells, but two of the bells were utilised by the Keltek Trust and were sent to Butterton, Staffordshire, as part of a restoration of their own ring.

As a result, four of the lightest six bells were recast and two new bells cast to replace the two Butterton bells; the heaviest four bells were retuned. All new fittings were provided including cast-iron headstocks, ball bearings and new clappers. The frame the bells hang in, which dates back to the 1869 installation, was strengthened before the bells were rehung. As noted in the 1983 inspection report, the bells were substantially out of tune prior to the work being carried out, and as such extensive retuning took place on the heaviest four bells; the tuning of the lightest six being beyond redemption. As a result, the weight of the tenor bell was reduced by more than 100 kg, to a new weight post-retuning of 27 long hundredweight 3 qrs and 24 lbs (3,132 lb or 1,421 kg). The retuning also moved the key of the ring down from D to D flat (D♭). New oak louvres were also manufactured for the massive belfry openings.

The restored and recast bells arrived back in Mirfield in March 2016 and were first rung just after Easter. The result has been hailed as "superb" and the bells at Mirfield are now considered "amongst the finest rings of ten in the country". The tower is notable for being one of only half a dozen towers remaining to have a complete set of 'Yorkshire tail ends', a variation on normal ropes featuring an additional woollen sally on the end of the rope for grip.

== Churchyard ==
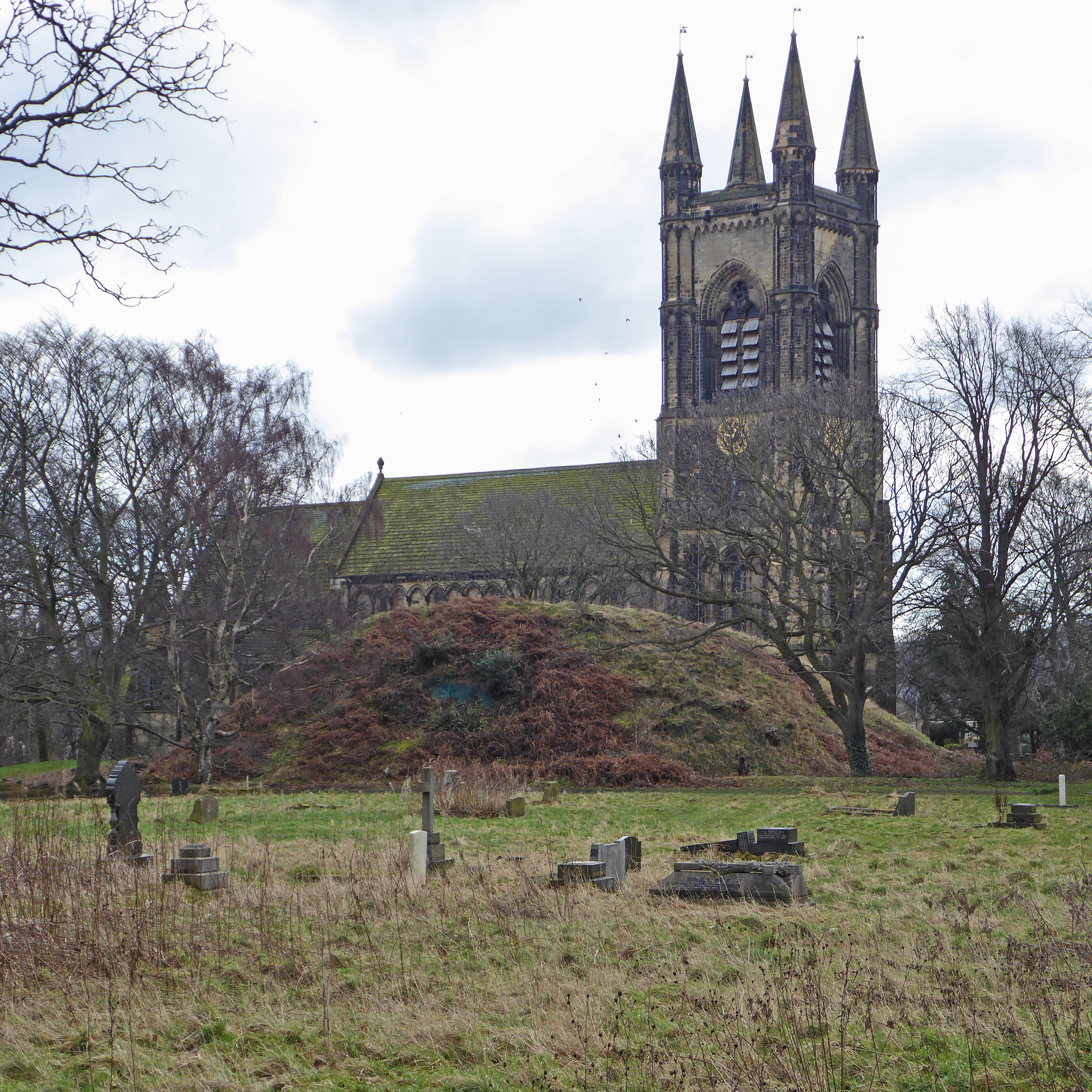
The surviving 30 feet high castle mound in the foreground

The churchyard at Mirfield is large, featuring numerous memorials. The body of the old church, demolished in 1873, now houses a memorial garden and there is a 12 feet (3.7 m) high stone cross near the main porch commemorating the First World War. A bell-shaped headstone marks the location of the grave of a former tower captain.

The most significant feature in the churchyard is the surviving 11th-century motte from a motte-and-bailey castle, located just behind the present church tower. This motte, which was originally surmounted by a wooden keep, is 29 feet (8.8 m) high with a diameter of nearly 60 feet (18 m). The motte is surrounded by a moat 26 feet (8 m) wide by 16 feet (5 m) deep. The castle was built between 1086 and 1159 and it was known as the castle of Mirfield throughout the Middle Ages. The present church stands on the site of the Bailey. The surviving motte is a Scheduled Ancient Monument.

There is a full survey of the graves and transcripts of the burial registers available via the External Links below.

== See also ==
- Grade II* listed buildings in West Yorkshire
- Listed buildings in Mirfield
