= Abdul Waheed Majeed =

First British suicide bomber in the Syrian civil war

- Born: 1972; Crawley, West Sussex, England
- Died: February 7, 2014 (aged 41–42); Aleppo, Syria
- Other name: Abu Suleiman al-Baritani
- Education: Hazelwick School
- Organization: Al-Nusra Front
- Known for: First British suicide bomber in the Syrian civil war
- Children: 3

Abdul Waheed Majeed (1972 – 2014) was a British-Pakistani man from Crawley in West Sussex who carried out a suicide bombing at the gates of a prison in Aleppo, Syria on February 6, 2014. He was a member of Al-Nusra Front, the tenth British national to die in the Syrian civil war, and the first British national to carry out a suicide attack in Syria.

== Life in Britain ==
Majeed, who went by his middle name, was born and raised in England, the son of Pakistani immigrants. He had one brother and one sister. He attended Hazelwick School as a boy. He reportedly took his Muslim faith seriously.

As an adult, he entered into an arranged marriage with a woman from Pakistan. Before his departure for Syria, he lived with his family on Martyrs Avenue in Langley Green. Coincidentally, Roy Whiting, a notorious child murderer, had previously lived in that same house. Majeed was an electrician and plumber and worked with Britain's Highways Agency. He attended Langley Green Mosque and was also a member of another mosque. At the time of his death, his two sons were in their teens, and he had a twelve-year-old daughter.

The radical Islamist cleric Omar Bakri Muhammad called Majeed "a very dear brother" and said he had been his student and driver. Bakri stated Majeed had been a member of his organization, Al-Muhajiroun, from the time of the group's establishment in 1996 until it was banned in 2004. Majeed's brother stated Majeed's links to Bakri and Al-Muhajiroun had been exaggerated. He stated his brother had chauffeured Bakri a few times and attended some talks organized by Al-Muhajiroun, but stopped going because he thought their ideas were too extremist.

== Departure for Syria and death ==
In July 2013, Majeed and a friend left Britain for Syria to be drivers on an humanitarian aid convoy organized by a Birmingham-based Muslim charity. After their arrival, the two men stayed to help refugees at the Turkish-Syrian border. Other members of the Langley Green Mosque went to Syria in December 2013 and met Majeed, who was working in a refugee camp at the time, and tried to persuade him to come home, but he refused. Majeed's friend returned to the UK in January 2014, and later said he didn't know how Majeed came to be recruited by Al-Nusra Front.

Majeed had never been to the Middle East before this. He called his family regularly after he left, and sent them photos of himself posing with refugees. The last time he spoke to them, the conversation was routine. Majeed told them he would be back home in April. Six days later, he carried out the suicide bombing. He was 41 years old at the time of his death.

The jihadist organization Al-Nusra Front released a video showing Majeed, whom they referred to by the nom de guerre Abu Suleiman al-Baritani, standing near an armoured dump truck, talking to other jihadists. When he was asked to make a statement, Majeed declined and said, "It should come from the heart and I can't do it." The video showed the armoured truck driving towards the prison, the sounds of gunfire breaking out, and a blast as the truck exploded. A friend of Majeed’s in Syria wrote on social media that the attack had been carried out in order to liberate the prisoners. Hundreds of prisoners reportedly escaped in this incident and 300 people were killed in the firefight between Al-Nusra fighters and Syrian government forces.

Majeed's uncle stated he had never shown any signs of extremist beliefs before his departure from England, and that the family would not have let him go to Syria if they had known he was going to carry out a suicide attack. Majeed's brother said he believed Majeed became radicalized by reports of the torture, starvation and executions that had occurred in the prisons under Bashar al-Assad's regime, and that this was what prompted him to join Al-Nusra Front and commit the attack so prisoners could escape. His brother said Majeed's children felt "no shame about what he did" because he had "martyred himself for people he did not know."

== See also ==
- Talha Asmal
- Brighton jihadists
- Ifthekar Jaman
