= Mirfield Town Hall =

Municipal building in Mirfield, West Yorkshire, England

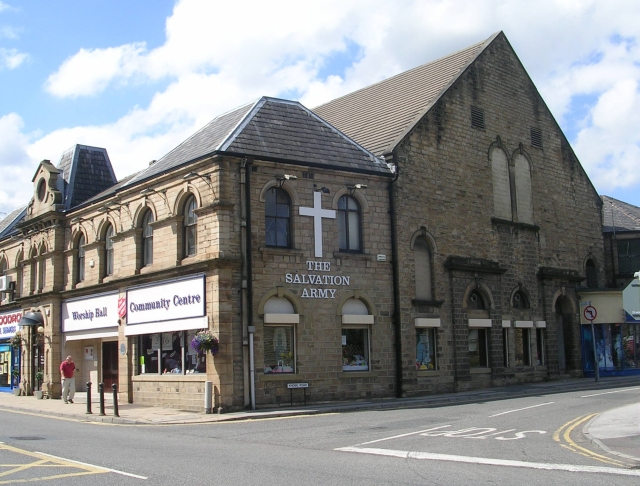
- The building in 2008

- Shown in West Yorkshire
- 53.6743°N 1.6915°W
- Location: Huddersfield Road, Mirfield

History
- Built: 1868

Site notes
- Architect(s): Kirk and Sons
- Architectural style: Italianate style

Mirfield Town Hall is a former municipal building in Huddersfield Road in Mirfield, a town in West Yorkshire in England. The building, which was previously the offices and meeting place of the Mirfield Urban District Council, is now used as a worship hall by the Salvation Army.

== History ==
In the early 1860s, a group of local businessmen decided to form a company, to be known as the "Mirfield Town Hall Company", to finance and commission a new town hall for the area. The site they selected was on the north side of the Huddersfield Road in the Eastthorpe Parish. The foundation stone for the new building was laid by the Mayor of Dewsbury, Edward Day, on 24 August 1867. It was designed by Kirk and Sons of Dewsbury in the Italianate style, built in ashlar stone and was officially opened the chairman of Mirfield Town Hall Company, J. Marshall Johnson, on 25 November 1868.

The design involved a symmetrical main frontage of five bays facing onto Huddersfield Road with the end bays slightly projected forward and surmounted by mansard roofs. The central bay, which was also slightly projected forward, featured a round headed opening with voussoirs on the ground floor and a pair of round headed windows with architraves and keystones on the first floor. The other four bays were fenestrated by shop fronts on the ground floor and by pairs of round headed windows with architraves and keystones on the first floor. At roof level, there was a cornice and a moulded gable above the central bay. Behind the moulded gable, there was a small tower in the Châteauesque style with cresting, although the cresting has since been removed. Internally, the principal rooms were a galleried hall, 90 feet (27 m) long and 40 feet (12 m) wide, with a capacity of 900 people, along with offices for the local board of health, and four shops facing on to the main road.

The building became an important public events venue. In November 1870, the founder of the National Secular Society and noted atheist, Charles Bradlaugh, was booked to give two lectures in the town hall. When the chairman of the Mirfield Town Hall Company, who had strong Christian views, found out, he cancelled the booking and barricaded the building. Bradlaugh sued for breach of contract but lost the case when the court decided that the hall keeper did not have authority to take the original bookings.

In 1894, the board of health was replaced by an urban district council which also maintained its headquarters in the building. In 1903, the council moved to new council offices further to the west along Huddersfield Road. The town hall was converted into a cinema and became the People's Picture Theatre in 1910, the Town Hall Cinema in 1913, and the Regent Cinema in the 1920s. In 1929, it was purchased by the owners of the Vale Cinema, which renamed it as the Glen Cinema, and, from 1939, refocused it on repeat films, while the main Vale Cinema on the south side of the Huddersfield Road showed original films. The Glen Cinema closed in 1955, and, after the building had been sold, the Mirfield Town Hall Company was wound up in 1970.

The new owners converted the building into a nightclub which, from the early 1970s, traded variously as The Pentagon, Tramps, Fusion, Panache, C.J's and Hardtimes, before being converted into a worship hall for the Salvation Army in November 1998.
