= Mirfield =

Town and civil parish in West Yorkshire, England

Coordinates: 53.6807°N 1.6888°W

- Town
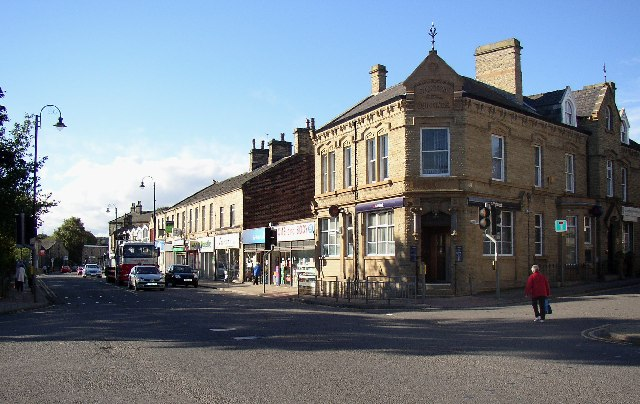
- Mirfield town centre

- Location within West Yorkshire
- Population: 19,563 (Ward. 2011 Census)
- OS grid reference: SE205205
- Civil parish: Mirfield
- Metropolitan borough: Kirklees
- Metropolitan county: West Yorkshire
- Region: Yorkshire and the Humber
- Country: England
- Sovereign state: United Kingdom
- Post town: MIRFIELD
- Postcode district: WF14
- Dialling code: 01924
- Police: West Yorkshire
- Fire: West Yorkshire
- Ambulance: Yorkshire
- UK Parliament: Spen Valley

Mirfield (/ˈmɜːrfiːld/) is a town and civil parish in the Metropolitan Borough of Kirklees, West Yorkshire, England. Historically part of the West Riding of Yorkshire, it is on the A644 road between Brighouse and Dewsbury. At the 2011 census it had a population of 19,563. Mirfield forms part of the Heavy Woollen District.

The name Mirfield derives from the Old English myrgefeld meaning 'pleasant field'.

== Governance ==
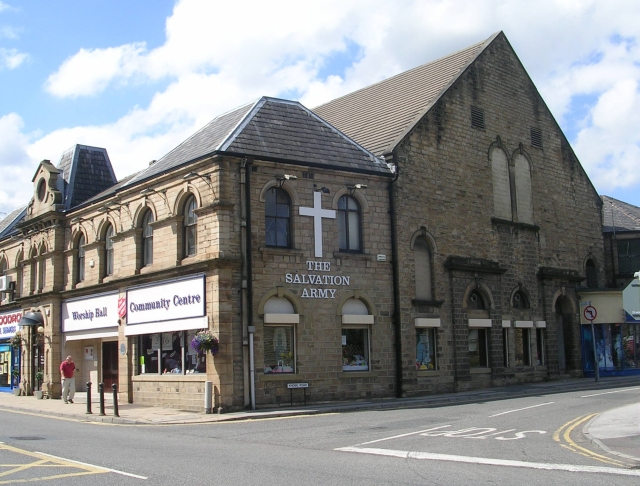
The former Mirfield Town Hall

From 1894 to 1974, Mirfield was an urban district in the West Riding of Yorkshire until it was merged into the Metropolitan Borough of Kirklees. In 1988 a parish council was formed, one of five in Kirklees, the others being:- Denby Dale, Meltham, Kirkburton and Holme Valley. As a parish council an additional tax precept to the Kirklees Metropolitan Borough Council tax is levied on the town's residents. It is made up of 16 councillors who serve for a fixed four-year term, and represent wards within the parish. The members elect a town mayor, who serves for a fixed one-year term. Mirfield Town Hall now serves as a worship hall for the Salvation Army.

=== Local elections ===
In addition to the town council Mirfield is represented by three councillors on Kirklees Metropolitan Council, and the local Mirfield Area Committee.

Party	Date	Candidate	Votes	Share
CON	2000	Beverley Warby	2,300	55.7
CON	2002	Martyn Bolt	2,147	52.9
CON	2003	Kathleen Taylor	1,802	39.8
CON	2004	Beverley Warby	2,947	–
CON	2004	Martyn Bolt	3,661	–
CON	2004	Kathleen Taylor	3,166	–
CON	2008	Martyn Bolt	3,400	–
CON	2010	Vivien Lees-Hamilton	5,908	–
CON	2011	Kathleen Taylor	3,561	–
CON	2011	Martyn Bolt	2,775	–

In May 2005, Mirfield became the first Fairtrade Town in Kirklees and only the fourth in West Yorkshire.

== Culture ==
The Mirfield Show is an annual agricultural event held on the third Sunday in August at Mirfield showground. It is organised and run by the Mirfield Agricultural Society (MAS) as a non-profit making event for the families of Mirfield and district.

Local residents introduced the Mirfield Food & Craft Fayre in April 2012, scheduled to be run the last Saturday of each month and "help raise the profile of Mirfield, be a benefit to local traders, businesses, organisations and charities, and add more destination events to the Yorkshire calendar".

== Education ==
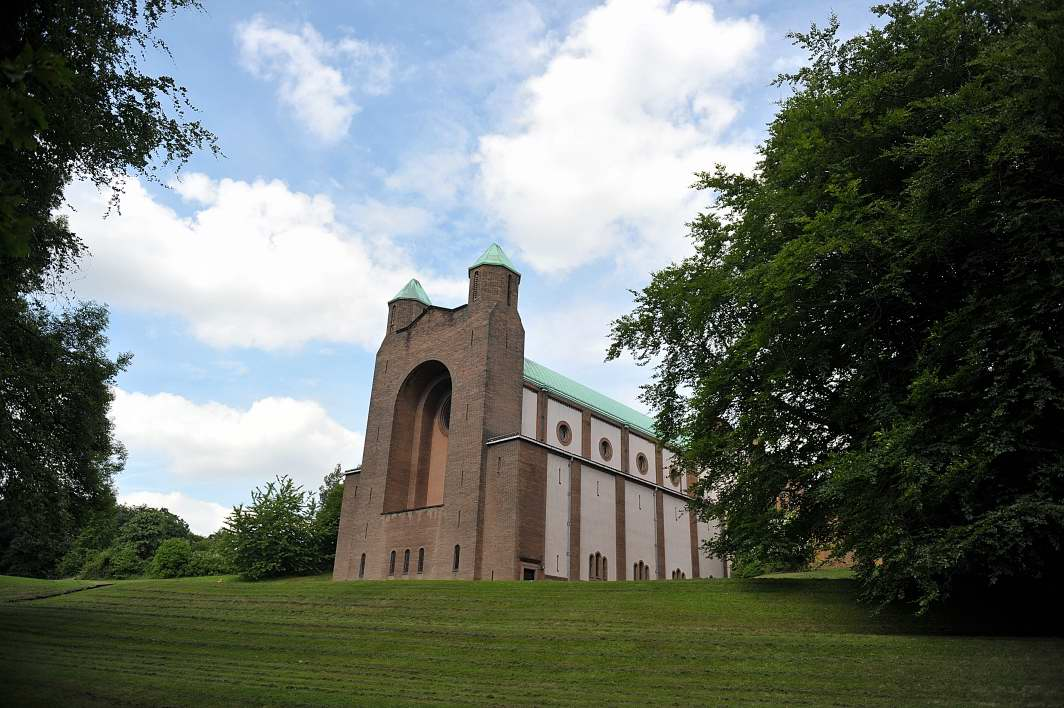
Church of the College of the Resurrection

There are two secondary schools in Mirfield: Mirfield Free Grammar and Sixth Form and Castle Hall Academy.

Primary schools include Battyeford CE Primary School, Crossley Fields, Old Bank, Hopton Primary School and Crowlees Junior and Infant School, all of which were assessed by Ofsted as 'Grade 1 – Outstanding' in the March 2007 inspection.

The College of the Resurrection in Mirfield is a Church of England theological college, associated with the Community of the Resurrection religious community. There Rowan Williams, later Archbishop of Canterbury, lectured from 1975 for two years and Archbishop Trevor Huddleston spent his last days.

== Landmarks ==
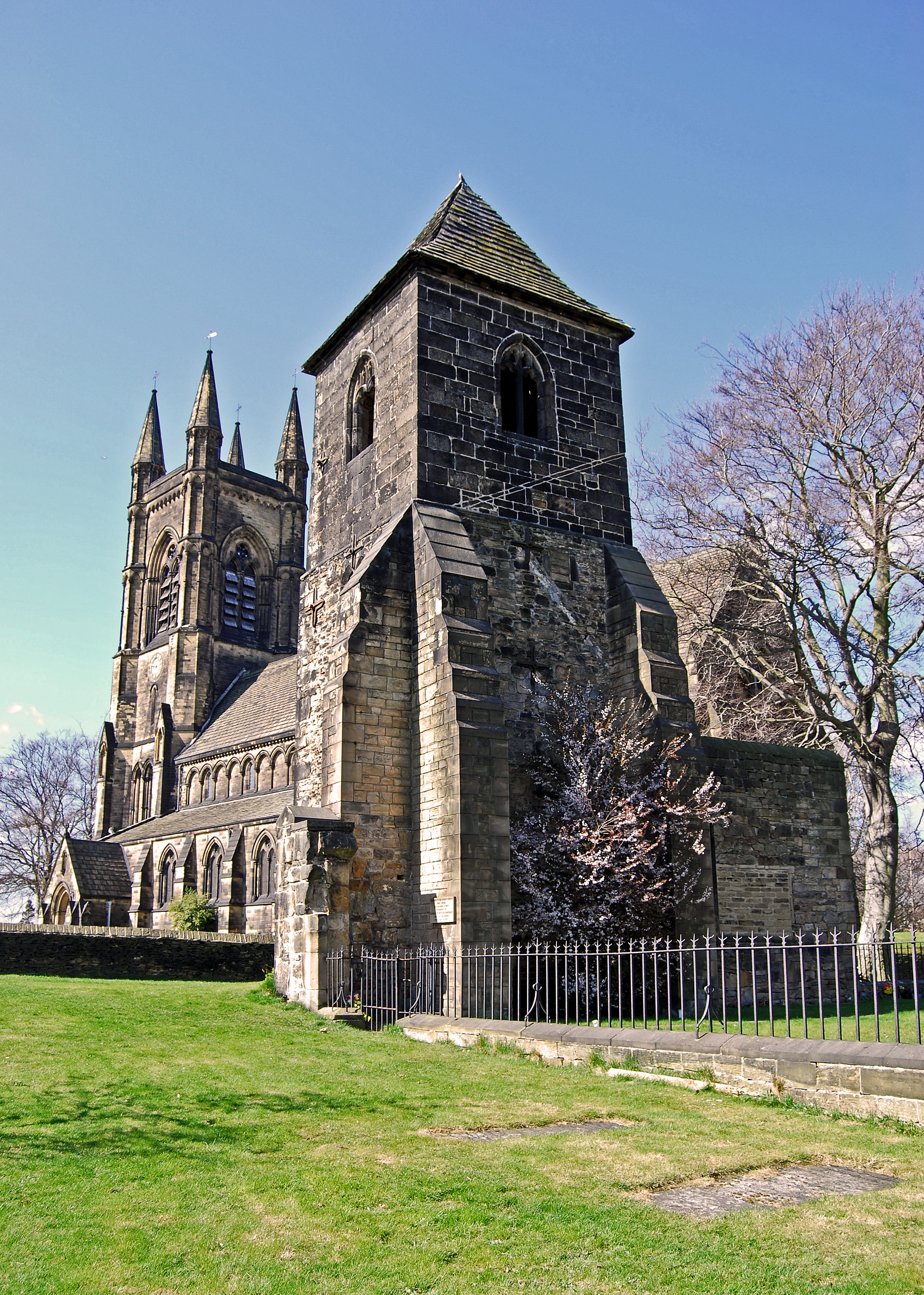
St Mary's Church

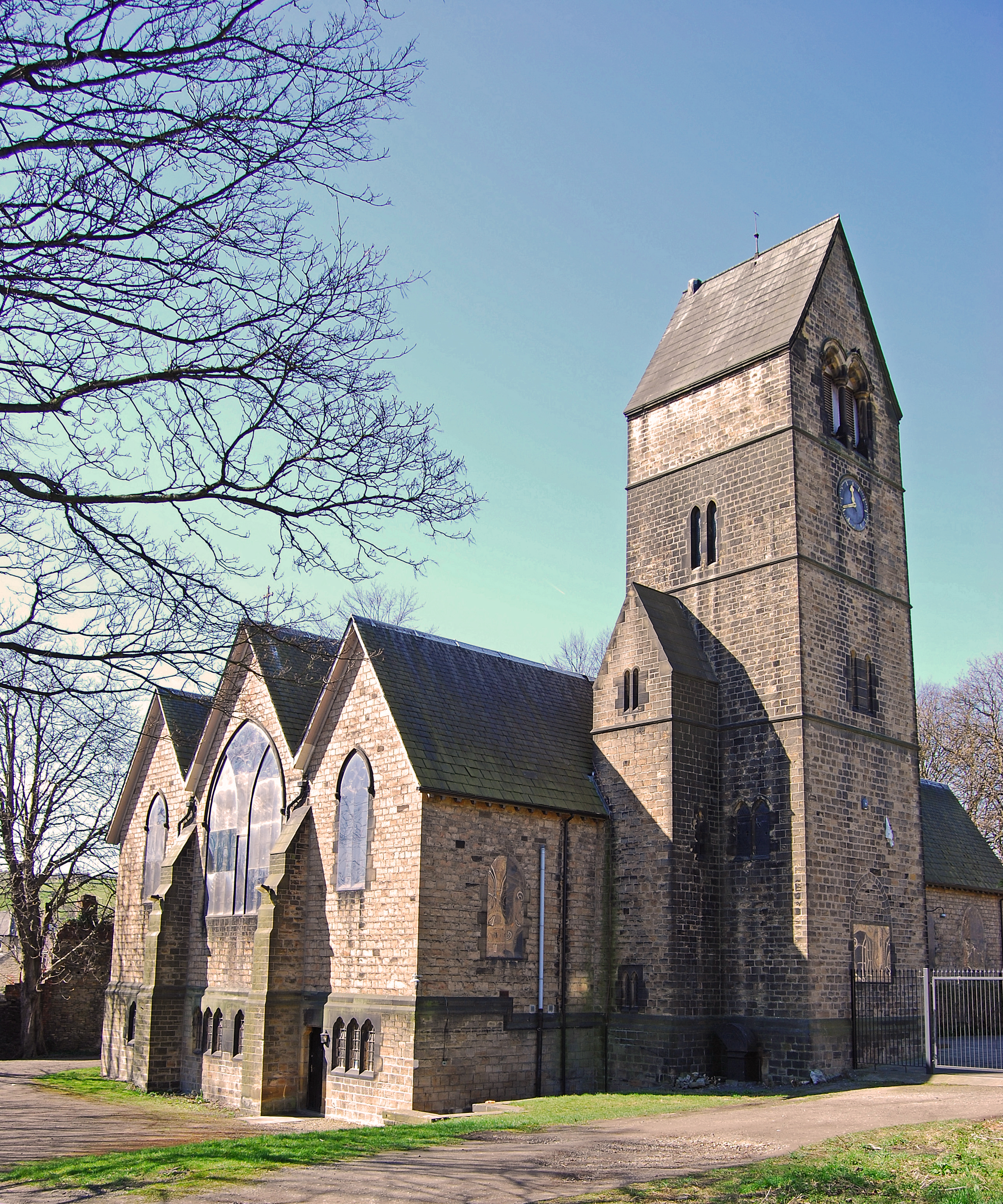
St Paul's Church

The 13th-century St Mary's Church was rebuilt in 1826 but proved too small for the growing population and was regarded as too minor for the growing district. A new church, designed by Sir George Gilbert Scott, was built a few yards to the northwest, on the site of Castle Hall, a mansion then home to the families of Mirfields (sometimes spelled Mirfin), Hetons and Beaumonts. At Scott's suggestion, the tower of the earlier church, which includes some medieval work, was retained.

St Mary's was the boyhood church of Sir Patrick Stewart, of I Claudius and Star Trek fame.

== Navigation ==
During the 18th century, a canal was constructed through the town linking the River Calder with other rivers in the area. The canal is part of the Calder and Hebble Navigation. Its construction resulted in many industries in Mirfield, such as the textiles and boat yards. The canal is still in use for recreational users with duck-feeding being especially popular.

Mirfield is the base of the Safe Anchor Trust, a charity founded in 1995 to provide canal boat trips for vulnerable and special needs people. In 2012, Princess Anne commissioned a new boat for the Trust.

== The Brontës ==
Roe Head school, Mirfield, was a boarding school on the road from Leeds to Huddersfield where Charlotte Brontë went as a pupil on 17 January 1831, followed by her sisters Emily and Anne. Charlotte was happy there and later returned to teach.

In April 1839 Anne returned to the town as governess to four children of the Ingham family of Blake Hall. Her unhappy experiences there were used in her first novel Agnes Grey.

== Notable people ==
- Lee Blakeley, theatre director
- Alun Cochrane, comedian
- Andi Durrant, radio presenter and music producer
- Debbie Lindley, television weather presenter
- Richard Reed, co-founder of Innocent Drinks
- Brian Robinson, cyclist, the first Briton to win a stage of the Tour de France
- Mary Snell-Hornby, translation scholar
- Neil Sean, journalist
- Sir Patrick Stewart, actor
- Hilda Annetta Walker, artist
- David Whyte, poet, philosopher

== Economy ==
There are many national businesses based in Mirfield including John Cotton Group Ltd, Furniture And Choice and We Buy Any Stairlift.

The town has a variety of local independent shops as well as national and multinational chains such as Aldi, Lidl, Tesco and Co-op Food.

== Sport ==
Mirfield is represented in Rugby League by Mirfield ARLFC, who play home matches at Frank Middleton Park and compete in the Pennine League Premier Division.

The town also has three teams in the Huddersfield Cricket League. Mirfield Cricket Club and Moorlands Cricket Club both based at the Memorial Park off Huddersfield Road. Mirfield Parish Cavaliers based on Wellhouse Lane, Northorpe.

The Mirfield Petanque Club who currently play in the West Yorkshire Petanque League and are also based at the Memorial Park.

== Twin town ==
Mirfield is twinned with:

- Kramolna, Czech Republic

== Arms ==
Coat of arms of Mirfield

Notes
Granted 26 February 1935 to Mirfield Urban District
Crest
On a wreath of the colours a demi knight affrontee in mail Proper with surcoat Argent two bars Sable supporting a representation of a church Or.
Escutcheon
Azure a chief Gules over all a ram's head caboshed between two ears of barley stalked and bladed in saltire Or.
Motto
Fruges Ecce Paludis (Behold The Fruits Of The Marsh)

== See also ==
- Listed buildings in Mirfield
- Mirfield Reporter
