= The Mirfield Free Grammar =

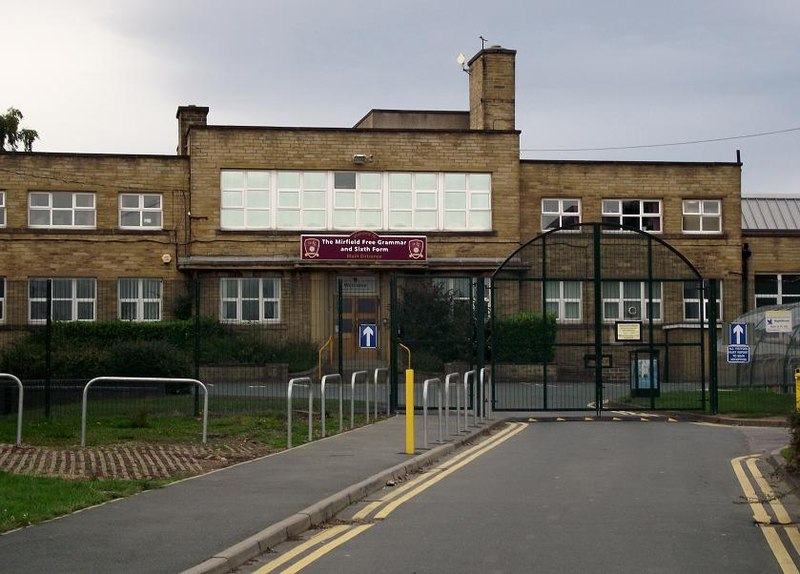

Location
- Kitson Hill Road; Mirfield, West Yorkshire; England; 53.6867°N 1.7025°W

Information
- Type: Comprehensive; Academy
- Motto: Achieving Excellence Together
- Established: 1667
- Ofsted: Reports
- Head teacher: Alexandra Fuller
- Gender: Coeducational
- Age: 11 to 18 (including sixth form)
- Website: www.themfg.co.uk

The Mirfield Free Grammar (also known as the MFG), previously Mirfield High School (MHS), and sixth form is a coeducational comprehensive secondary school in the town of Mirfield, West Yorkshire, England. Mirfield Free Grammar School was founded by Richard Thorpe of Hopton in 1667. The current school is a merger of the town's grammar school and secondary modern school, the latter founded in 1951.

Patrick Stewart was a student at the Mirfield Secondary Modern. In September 2011, he inaugurated the school as an academy. The school was rated 'Outstanding' by Ofsted in both 2008 and 2012.

In 2013 a new extension was added to the sports centre which included a Dance Studio and Gym.

The school underwent major renovations that were completed by September 2014, they included a new Music, Drama and DT classrooms, as well as a redeveloped quad area with ramp access for students that required the permanent demolition of existing buildings.

== Notable former pupils ==
Sir Patrick Stewart was most widely known for his roles as Captain Jean-Luc Picard in Star Trek: The Next Generation and as Professor Charles Xavier in the X-Men film series, and also for his stage roles with the Royal Shakespeare Company.

Sir Malcolm Conrad Walker CBE (born 11 February 1946) an English businessman who is the founder of Iceland Foods Ltd.

Talha Asmal attended the school before he left to join the Islamic State. At 17, he became the youngest suicide bomber in British history.
