= Australia, New Zealand, and the Islamic State =

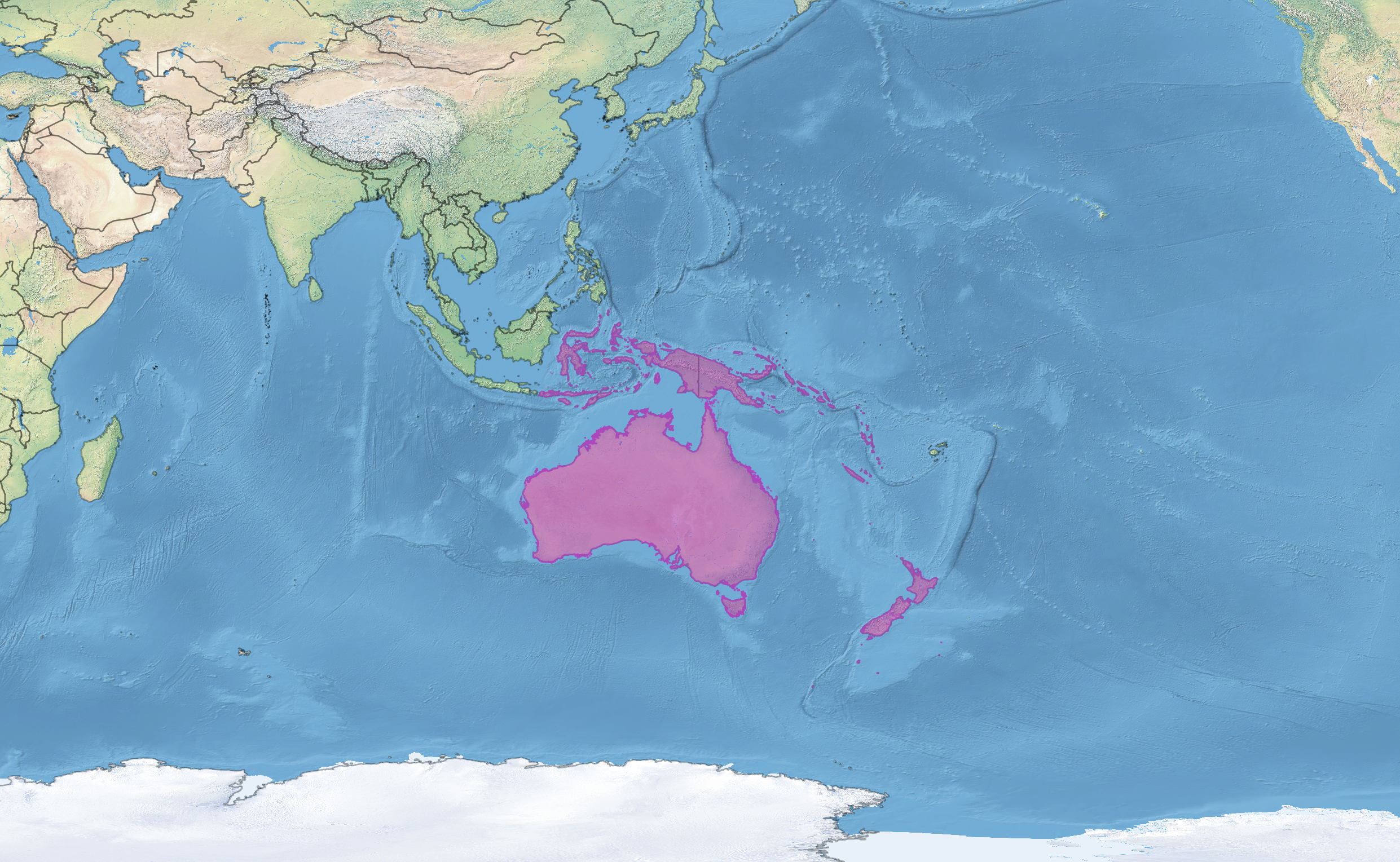
Australasia includes Australia, New Zealand, Papua New Guinea and their neighbours in western Oceania.

This is a timeline of Islamic State activities related to Australia and New Zealand, collectively known as Australasia.

The events below include terrorist and extremist activities of Islamic State supporters in Australia and New Zealand, Australians and New Zealanders who travelled overseas to join the Islamic State (a journey that was referred to by the group as hijra) or attempted to, and depictions of Australians and New Zealand in Islamic State propaganda on social media and in I.S. state media. It also includes Australia and New Zealand's military and intelligence involvement in the war against the Islamic State.

The most deadly terrorist attack on Australian soil was the Islamic State–inspired 2025 Bondi Beach shooting (detailed timeline), allegedly committed by Naveed Akram and his father Sajid Akram (who was killed by police during the attack), targeting Jewish Australians at a Hanukkah gathering at Bondi Beach. Before this, several Islamic State plots were successfully thwarted by Australian intelligence and law enforcement bodies.

== Background ==
=== Islamic State ===
The Islamic State movement self-describe as "Islamic" but their religious beliefs are an unusual derivative of Islam, that has been rejected by the vast majority of Muslims, including Islamic terrorists and Islamic extremists. Progressive and conservative Muslims alike describe the ideology of the Islamic State as "deviant".

The Islamic State excommunicate other Muslims, calling them infidels or apostates.

Islamic State militants violently oppose – and are violently opposed by – many of the groups that are listed terrorist organisations in Australia's Criminal Code such as al-Qaeda, the PKK (Kurdistan Workers' Party), Hezbollah (listed since 2021), Hamas (listed since 2022), and Iran's IRGC (the Islamic Revolutionary Guard Corps, listed in November 2025).

Some of their most deadly attacks have been against Shia Muslims, including civilian and military targets in Iran, a Shia-led Islamic Republic. Iran charges Islamic State militants with "waging war against God" (Moharebeh) and terrorism against civilians, among other crimes. The ideology of the Islamic State rejects the concept of nation-states and cultural identity.

Followers of the Islamic State ideology, including in Sydney, have no interest in recognition of rival states. Symbols such as national flags are shuned by the movement. One violent manifestation of this opposition to nationalism is the active armed conflict between Islamic State's Khorasan "Province" (ISK) and the Taliban in Central Asia, whom ISK ridicule as "filthy nationalists".

=== Australian migrants to the Islamic State ===
Prior to the Bondi attack, one of the most significant Islamic State-related problems faced by the Australian government were the family members of Islamic State fighters from Australia, who remain in detention camps in the Middle East, in Kurdistan and neighbouring regions. ASIO estimates that over 200 Australians migrated to the unrecognised state / illegitimate Caliphate founded by the Islamic State movement while they controlled territory in Iraq and Syria.

Young boys who have been there nearly a decade are transferred to the mens prison when they reach military age. The survivors are mostly widows and children, most of the men died of the battlefield or were killed in targeted strikes. There are also a few remaining Islamic State fighters from Australia who have been confirmed alive or remain unaccounted for.

The Australian Government have been criticised for treating the ongoing situation as somebody else's problem.

=== Islamic State activities in Australia ===
A number of incidents relating to the Islamic State of Iraq and the Levant (ISIL) terrorist group have involved Australians and garnered the attention of the Australian public. ISIL is a militant Sunni group which has been proscribed by Australian authorities as a terrorist organisation.

In 2014, two Australian ISIS propagandists made a propaganda video encouraging Australians to join the ISIL, According to the Australian government, up to 150 Australians "have been or are currently overseas fighting with extremists in Iraq and Syria". Some of their activities are thought to be war crimes. One Australian jihadist, Khaled Sharrouf, posted a picture of himself, and another of his son, holding a decapitated soldier's head.

ISIL recruited Australian nationals for terror attacks in the Middle East including suicide bombings as late as March 2015. Eighteen-year-old Jake Bilardi, known as Jihadi Jake, converted to Sunni Islam. He died on 11 March 2015 when he carried out a suicide bombing against the Iraqi Army in Ramadi, Iraq.

In 2015 it was reported that more than 20 Australians who have fought with ISIL have returned and are being monitored by security agencies. Then Foreign Minister Julie Bishop has said, "there is a risk they will come back as battle-hardened experienced terrorists ... and try to carry out terrorist attacks".

The Australian Security Intelligence Organisation (ASIO) is concerned that Australians fighting jihad may return home to plan terror attacks. In October 2014, ISIL published an online video in which a teenage Australian Jihadi, Abdullah Elmir, threatened the United States and Australia, naming U.S. President Barack Obama and Australian Prime Minister Tony Abbott as targets.

On 18 April 2015, at least 200 police officers conducted a series of raids in Melbourne, frustrating a terror plot planned for ANZAC Day. During the raids Sevdet Besim was arrested, and in June 2016 pleaded guilty to planning a terrorism attack, in which he planned to behead a police officer. In October 2015, a British minor from Blackburn was found guilty and sentenced to life in prison for being the mastermind of the plot. In January 2021, the Parole Board said that "considerable progress that had been made" in his rehabilitation, and that he was suitable for release.

According to witnesses, some years later, some the officers committed some abuses during the raid; they had thrown a suspect into a fridge, causing a deep cut, made repeated racial slurs to an Aboriginal man and assaulted him. The Australian federal police spent years denying these accusations.

On 6 September 2016 ISIL published a new online magazine in which they urged "lone wolves" to carry out attacks:

Kill them on the streets of Brunswick, Broadmeadows, Bankstown, and Bondi. Kill them at the MCG, the SCG, the Opera House, and even in their backyards,

The same statement was published in other languages naming locations in France, Germany and Indonesia.

Two days later on 8 September a man was detained at the Sydney Opera House after acting suspiciously. He was later charged with "threatening to destroy or damage property."

== 2013 to 2018 ==
=== 2014 ===
- 23 September 2014 – 2014 Endeavour Hills stabbings: Two counter-terrorism police officers stabbed. Perpetrator shot dead.
- 18 September 2014 – The Australian Federal Police, Australian Security Intelligence Organisation, Queensland Police and New South Wales Police launched the largest counterterrorism operation in Australian history. The targets were IS-linked networks thought to be planning to launch mass-casualty attacks in populated areas. Fifteen people were arrested in the raids with one being charged with terrorism offences.
- 3 October 2014 – Australian Prime Minister Tony Abbott announced that Australia would contribute eight F/A-18F Super Hornets to aid the war effort against Islamic extremists in Iraq. The aircraft join a KC-30A Tanker and an E-7A Wedgetail AEW&C aircraft already deployed.
- 29 October 2014 – Australian IS leader and recruiter Mohammad Ali Baryalei was confirmed to have been killed.
- 15 December 2014 – Lindt Cafe siege: in Sydney, by Man Haron Monis. Allegedly an IS supporter who pledged allegiance to the group held 18 hostages at a café at the APA Building in Martin Place, Sydney, Australia. One hostage was murdered during the siege and one killed by a bullet ricochet from a police officer during the subsequent raid. Perpetrator shot dead by police during raid.

=== 2015 ===
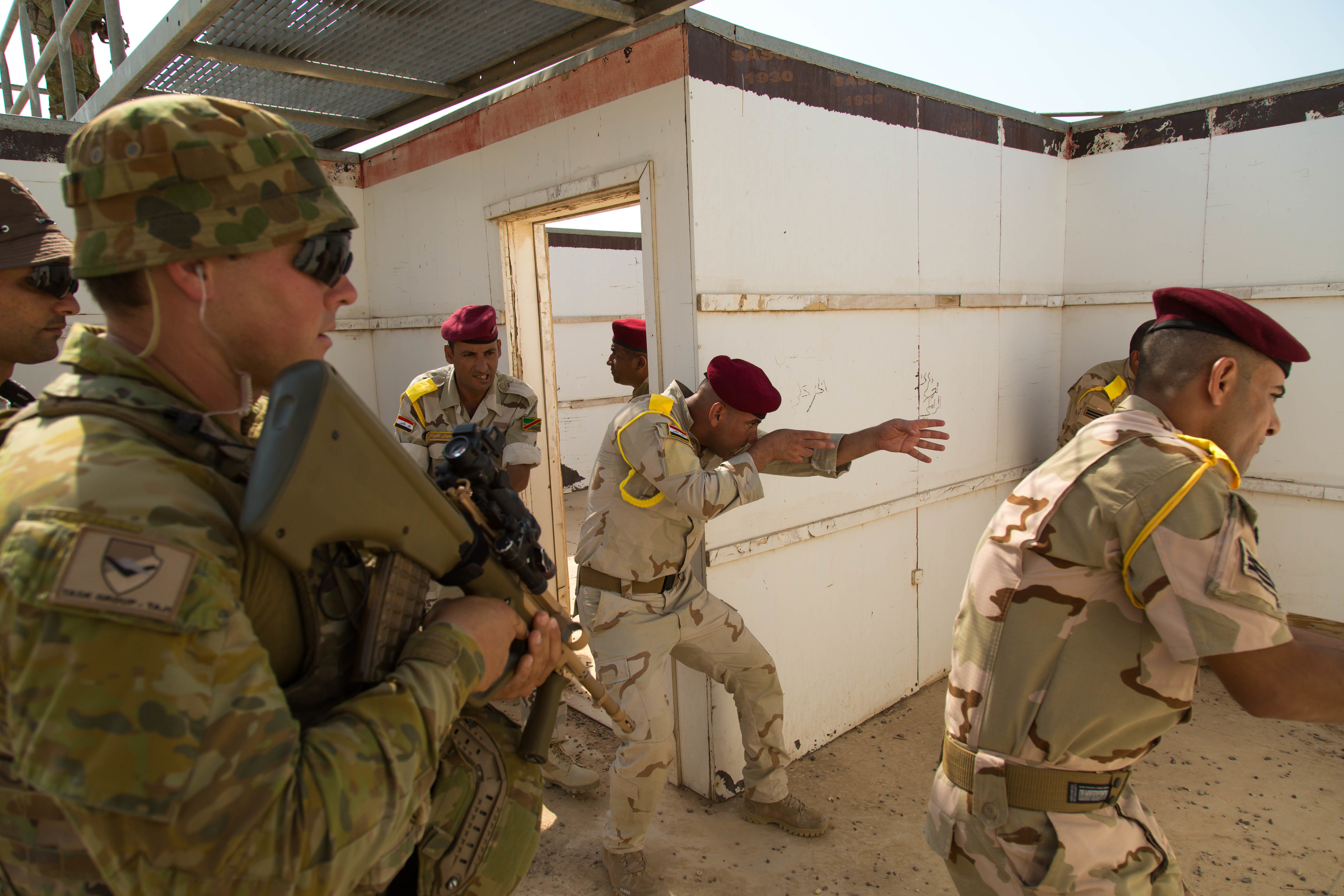
Australian soldiers assisting Iraqi soldiers during training in July 2015

- 11 March 2015 – Jake Bilardi (an 18-year-old Italian Australian from Melbourne, also known as Abu Abdullah al-Australi, and dubbed Jihad Jake by the media) killed himself in a truck bombing against the Iraqi army, after migrating to Iraq to join an ISIS-affiliated group.
- 20 April 2015 – An 18-year-old from New Zealand joins IS and is reported missing. New Zealand and Australia are concerned about IS-related terrorism at Anzac day.
- 9 September 2015 – Joshua Ryne Goldberg, a Jewish American internet troll, was arrested for planning a bombing in Kansas City while posing as an Australian ISIS supporter. A 17-year-old Melbourne teenager who had been in contact with Goldberg pleaded guilty to preparing a terror attack, after bombs were found in his home. Goldberg's ISIS persona also attempted to incite mass shootings in Australia. Goldberg reportedly set up a fake account in the name of Australian Muslim preacher Junaid Thorne. Goldberg also created multiple fake jihadist accounts, which interacted with the fake Thorne account, and he then sent screengrabs of the fabricated interactions to journalists, at least one of whom published the fake interaction in an article of The West Australian in April 2015. The fake jihadist personas were also used to besmirch Amnesty International and the Human Rights Law Centre by claiming that the fake jihadists had employment ties, or donated money to, these organisations.
- 14 September 2015 – Two Australian Hornet fighter aircraft destroyed an IS armoured personnel carrier with a precision-guided missile in east Syria.

=== 2016 ===
- 31 January 2016 – A prominent Australian IS member's death is reported. Neil Prakash, also known as Abu Khaled al-Cambodi, was involved in the group's online recruitment activities.
- 6 February 2016 – An Australian man is deported from India after Indira Gandhi International Airport security personnel reportedly find pro-IS material on his laptop.

=== 2017 ===
- Isaac El Matari jailed in Lebanon.
- By 2017 the Islamic State had lost 90% of their territory.
- 15 July 2017 – Failed Islamic State–linked plan to bomb an Etihad Airways flight departing Sydney for Abu Dhabi. Brothers Mahmoud and Khaled Khayat in Sydney planted a bomb in luggage belonging to their brother Amer Khayat, using parts sent to them by a forth brother, Tarek Khayat, from overseas. Amer was found not guilty, he was used as an unwitting proxy, possibly because his brothers disapproved of his drinking and other habits.

=== 2018 ===
- August 2018 – Australia stripped the Australian citizenship from five terrorists who had travelled to fight with the Islamic State and barred them from entering Australia again. This was only possible because they had double citizenships because international law stops the measure from being used on individuals with only one citizenship. The five brought the total to six.
- 9 November 2018 – a man named Hassan Khalif Shire Ali went on a stabbing spree in Melbourne Australia. The attack took place on a crowded Melbourne street where he attacked and killed a police officer with a knife and light bulb. The attacker also injured two other bystanders until he was eventually killed by law enforcement. The perpetrator supported IS and IS also took responsibility for the attack.

== 2019 ==
=== March 2019 ===
The Islamic State were declared "defeated" in Iraq and Syria by their opponents.

On 15 March 2019 – An Australian terrorist killed 51 people in the Christchurch shooting, inspired by the antisemitic Great Replacement conspiracy theory and the death of an 11-year-old girl in an ISIS attack. The Christchurch attack featured in Islamic State propaganda with Abu Hassan al-Muhajir calling for attacks on the “nations of the Cross and the apostate” in retaliation for the attack.

=== ASIO investigations in 2019 ===
- Youssef Uweinat was convicted of terrorism and imprisoned, for attempting to recruit minors to carry out attacks for Islamic State.

== After 2019 ==
=== 2021 ===
- 19 June 2021 – A 24-year-old man in Sydney was arrested for alleged membership of ISIS.
- 3 September 2021 – Auckland supermarket stabbing
- 30 September 2021 – New Zealand passed a law specifically criminalising planning a terror attack. According to NDTV, this was in response to a "loophole" that was "exposed" by the ISIS-linked stabbing attack carried out by Aathil Mohamed Samsudeen that injured 8 people in an supermarket in Auckland earlier that month. According to the Stuff website, the New Zealand House of Representatives passed the Counter-Terrorism Legislation Act 2021, which criminalised the planning of terror attacks and expanded the powers of police to conduct warrantless searches. The counter-terrorism bill was supported by the governing Labour and opposition National parties but was opposed by the Green, ACT and Māori parties.

=== 2024 ===
==== January 2024 ====
- January 2024 – A new Commonwealth offence introduced as part of amendments to Australian counter-terrorism legislation outlawing transmission of violent extremist material online. First person sentenced in March 2025.

==== May 2024 ====
- 17 May 2024 – IS-K claimed responsibility for the 2024 Bamyan shooting in Afghanistan, in the city of Bamyan, Bamyan Province, that led to the deaths of 6 people, including 3 Spanish tourists, as well as injuring 8 people, including one Lithuanian, one Norwegian, one Australian and another Spaniard. The majority of the targeted victims were foreign tourists. In Afghanistan, the 2024 Bamyan shooting: Gunman attacked a group of Western tourists (Spaniards, Lithuanians, Norwegians, and Australians), alongside their Afghan guides, in the city of Bamyan, Bamyan Province with machine-gun fire, killing seven people (including four tourists), and wounding seven others (including three tourists) before fleeing the scene. Islamic State claimed responsibility.

=== 2025 ===
==== March 2025 ====
- 20 March 2025 – A 19-year old West Australian man is sentenced to three years’ imprisonment by the Perth District Court on one count of transmitting violent extremist material online and one count of using a carriage service to cause offence after sharing Islamic State-produced videos that included beheadings and recordings encouraging violence. He is the first person convicted and sentenced in Australia for transmitting violent extremist material online under the new Commonwealth offence introduced in January 2024 as part of amendments to Australian counter-terrorism legislation.

==== August 2025 ====
- 3 August 2025 - Youssef Uweinat and Wisam Hadad, two past supporters of Islamic State, connected to Naveed Akram in 2019, were reported as trying to exploit public protests to further a conflicting agenda. Uweinat (sometimes known by the kunya Abu Musa al-Maqdisi) was imprisoned from 2019 to 2023 for terrorism-related offences, after trying to recruit 17 and 18-year-olds to pledge loyalty to the Islamic State, a role that some media described as an Islamic State "youth recruiter". He has since claimed to no-longer support IS. Uweinat was photographed waving a black flag (used by ISIS, Al Qaeda, and other groups) at the edges of a protest on the Harbour bridge. Haddad posted the flag image on social media saying, "The only flag that counts!" A report from ABC News Australia described Haddad as having "no interest in a Palestinian state" and trying to "exploit and fracture the pro-Palestinian movement".

==== December 2025 ====
- 14 December 2025 – Bondi Beach shooting: Two ISIS inspired gunmen fired upon approximately one thousand people at a Hanukkah celebration at Bondi Beach in Sydney, Australia. A total of 16 people were killed, including a ten-year-old child and 40 people were injured.

== See also ==
- Australian war crimes
- Battle of Brisbane
- Brussels Islamic State terror cell
- Coalition of the willing (Iraq War)
- Demographics of Australia
- Far-right terrorism in Australia
- Five Eyes
- History of the Islamic State
- History of Sydney
- Islamophobia in Australia
- Terrorism in Australia
- Timeline of the Islamic State
- Timeline of the Islamic State and Australia
- War against the Islamic State
