= 2015 Parramatta shooting =

Terror attack in 2015 in Sydney, Australia

Coordinates: 33.817191°S 151.008539°E

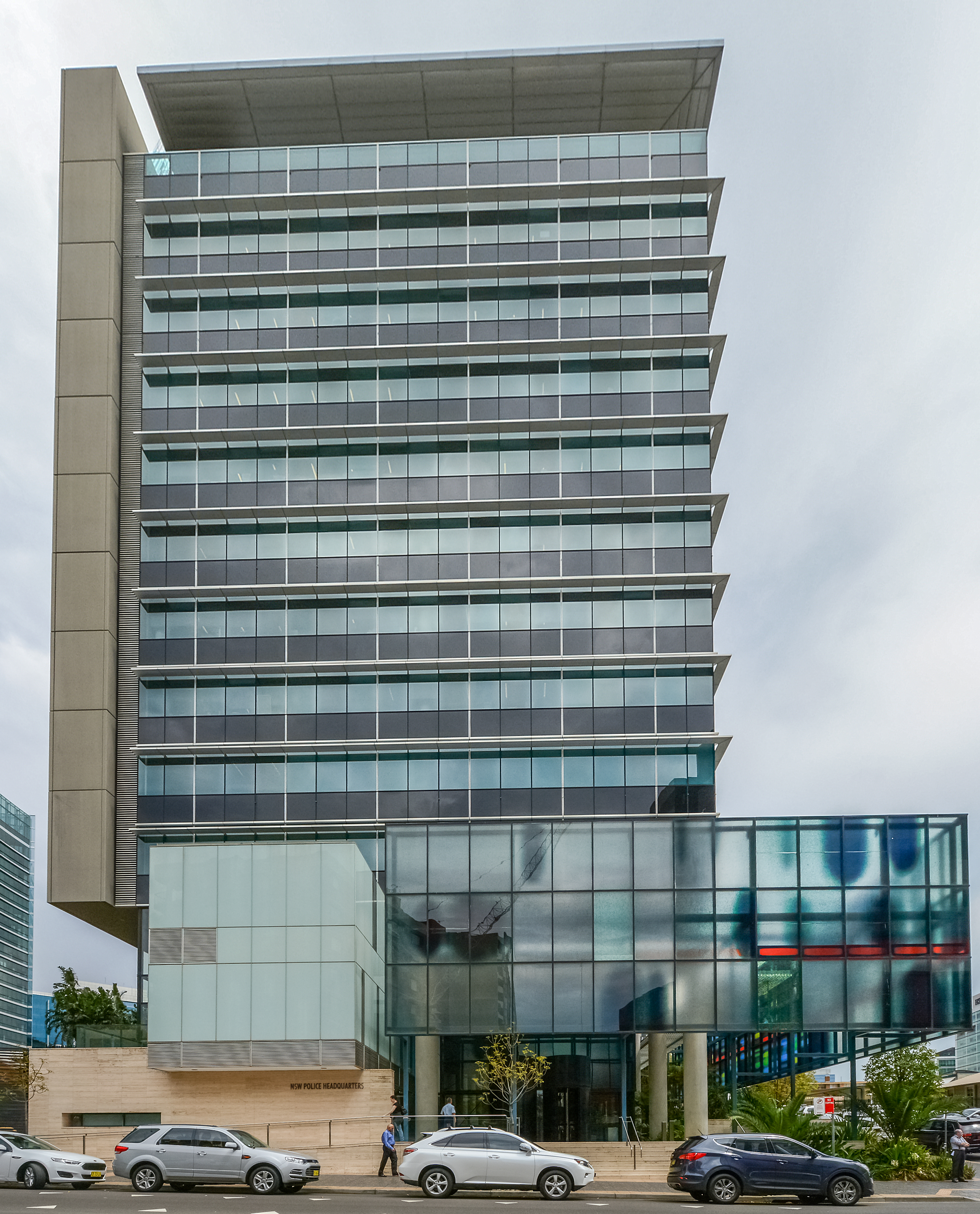
- NSW Police Headquarters on Charles Street, Parramatta
- Location: New South Wales Police Force; NSW Police Headquarters (The Curtis Cheng Centre); Parramatta
- Date: 2 October 2015; 4:30 p.m. (AEST)
- Target: NSW Police Force
- Attack type: Shooting
- Weapon: S&W .38 revolver
- Deaths: 2 (including the perpetrator)
- Victim: Curtis Cheng
- Perpetrator: Farhad Khalil Mohammad Jabar
- Motive: Islamic terrorism

On 2 October 2015, Farhad Khalil Mohammad Jabar, a 15-year-old boy, shot and killed Curtis Cheng, an unarmed police civilian finance worker, outside the New South Wales Police Force headquarters in Parramatta, Sydney, Australia. Jabar was subsequently shot and killed by special constables who were protecting the headquarters. As of 27 April 2016, four other men have been charged in relation to the shooting, among whom Raban Alou was convicted of terrorism offences in March 2018.

NSW Police Commissioner Andrew Scipione described the event as a politically motivated act of terrorism.

== Background ==
In the days leading up to the shooting, police reported that there had been an increase of "chatter" about a potential attack occurring. An alert had been circulated to all police, ordering them to wear their firearms on them at all times, even at their desk. Police are believed to have had intelligence of a potential attack on the Parramatta headquarters up to 12 months prior, although it was unknown if that was linked to the 2 October 2015 incident. In the days before the shooting, police and security officers had seen an individual taking photographs of the entrance to Police Headquarters.

Police investigated the crime as a "terrorism offence."

== Shooting ==
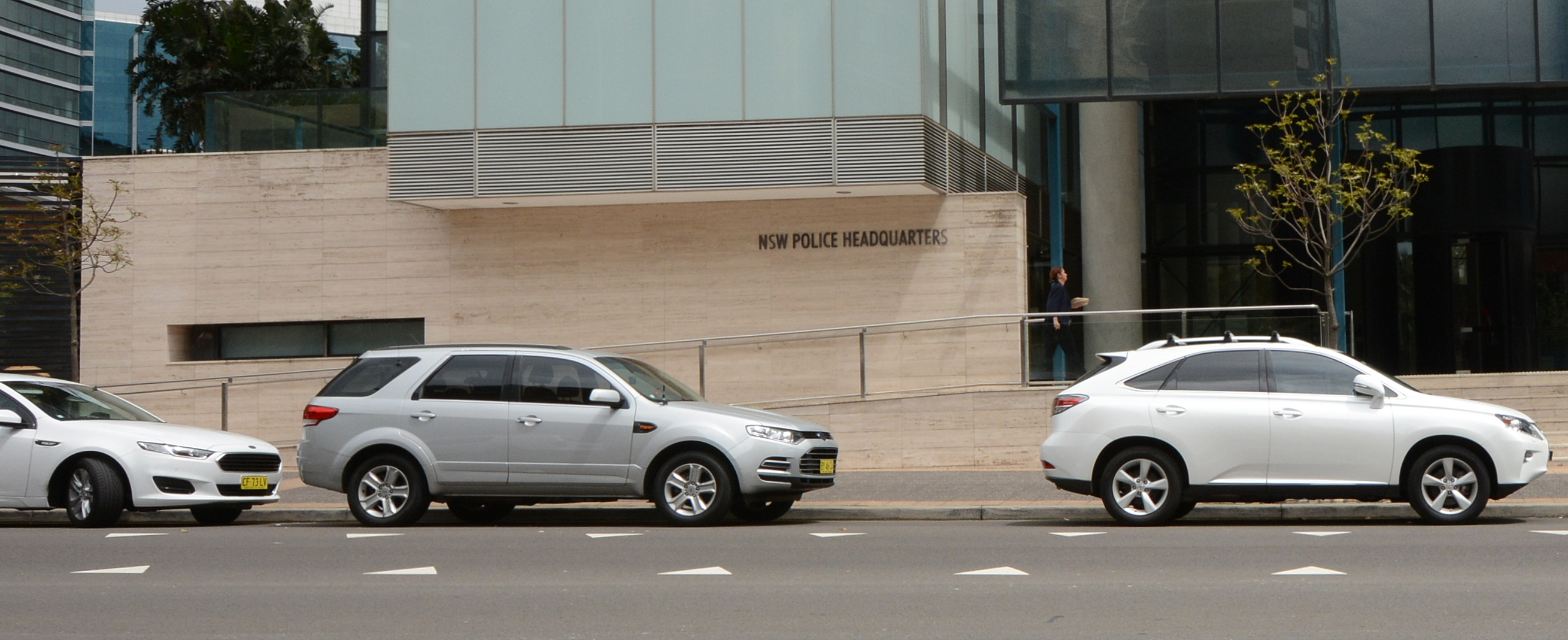
Entrance to the building where the shootings took place

On 2 October 2015, a 15-year-old boy carried a S&W .38 revolver to the street outside NSW Police Headquarters at Parramatta, walking past an unarmed plain clothes female detective. At 4:30 p.m., the assailant killed 58-year-old unarmed police civilian accountant Curtis Cheng as he was walking out of the building. The shooter remained at the scene and continued firing into the police headquarters. He was shot dead by one of three special constables who responded to the shooting.

== Perpetrator ==
Farhad Khalil Mohammad Jabar (25 January 2000 – 2 October 2015, age 15), an Iranian-born boy of Iraqi Kurdish background, was identified as the shooter. He was not known to police, and just prior to the attack he had visited a local mosque, where he listened to a lecture by extremist Islamist group Hizb ut-Tahrir. A report by Peter Lloyd on PM argued that Jabar had visited Bukhari House, which promotes the views of Feiz Mohammad.

Jabar lived in North Parramatta and was a Year 10 student at Arthur Phillip High School. He was in the same year as a student who in 2014 flew an ISIL flag through Western Sydney. He was described by classmates as quiet, often upset-looking, solitary, obedient, humble, occasionally bullied, and good at basketball. His neighbours called him a "normal" kid.

Investigations into Jabar's motivations for the attack were ongoing, but it is suspected "there was some influence" that was of an ideological, religious, or political nature.

Jabar was buried in the Islamic section of Rookwood Cemetery.

== Aftermath ==
ABC News reported that Farhad Jabar's older sister, Shadi Jabar Khalil Mohammad, went missing on 1 October and may have flown out of the country to Istanbul. It was subsequently reported that she was thought to be in Syria. In Syria, she used the nom de guerre Umm Issa al-Amrikiah. In May 2016, the Australian Government was advised by the US Government that she had been killed by a US airstrike on 22 April 2016 in Al-Bab, near Aleppo in Syria.

Cheng's funeral was held at St Mary's Cathedral, Sydney on 17 October 2015. The service was attended by his family, senior politicians and police officers, and 1500 mourners. A guard of honour lined the cathedral steps and the road outside.

In November 2015, the Four Corners TV program ran an episode entitled Plan of Attack: The making of a teenage terrorist which documented the chronology of related events prior to the Parramatta shooting. The program covered the roles of: Abdul Nacer Benbrika, Faheem Khalid Lodhi, Khaled Sharrouf, Jihadi Jake and detailed the 2005 Sydney terrorism plot, the Holsworthy Barracks terror plot and the 2014 Endeavour Hills stabbings.

In 2016, the NSW Police Headquarters was renamed to the Curtis Cheng Centre in honor of the victim of the shooting.

Jabar's older brother, his wife and daughter said they intended to move back to Iraq. Subsequently, they left Australia.

=== Terrorism charges ===
On 4 October 2015, police raided the Parramatta mosque. It was reported that Farhad Jabar would frequently skip school to attend prayers there.

On 6 October 2015, police arrested another student of Arthur Phillip High School for allegedly posting offensive and threatening material on Facebook in support of the shooting. On the next morning, 200 counter-terrorism police raided four homes near Parramatta and arrested four males. Three of the four males were later released.

On 15 October 2015, police re-arrested, and charged, Talal Alameddine, 22, with supplying a firearm, breaching a firearms prohibition order and hindering police. Almeddine was one of the three previously released.

In January 2016, new charges of being members of a terrorist group were laid against three men, in connection with Cheng's murder. The men were held in Goulburn jail, with bail refused.

On 27 April 2016, a fourth person, Milad Atai, was charged in relation to the shooting. He was charged with "providing support to a terrorist organisation" for allegedly aiding the travel of Jabar's sister to Syria. Atai was later charged with planning the attack. On 23 November 2018 Atai was found guilty of "... assisting and encouraging 15-year-old Farhad Jabar to shoot Mr Cheng"... "... and helping the boy's sister reach Islamic State in Syria." and was sentenced to 38 years jail with a minimum of 28½ years.

Raban Alou, 18, held since 6 October, was charged with aiding, abetting, counselling and procuring the commission of a terrorist act. Counter-terrorism sources have said that the case against Raban and Alameddine was circumstantial. In a court case during which the judge warned Alou that refusal to stand for the court could have consequences for sentencing, Alou pleaded guilty to "aiding, abetting, counselling and procuring the commission of a terrorist act" and was sentenced to 44 years in prison.

Alamaddine pleaded guilty to "possession of the revolver connected with the preparation for a terrorist act, and being reckless as to that connection." and also to supplying the revolver to Alou, and "twice breaching a firearm prohibition order previously placed on him". In May 2018 Alameddine was sentenced by judge Peter Johnson in the NSW Supreme Court to 17 years, 8 months with a minimum of 13½ years.

== Reactions ==
NSW Police Commissioner Andrew Scipione and Prime Minister Malcolm Turnbull said Jabar appears to have committed a politically motivated act of terrorism. Muslim community leader Dr Jamal Rifi put out a statement, saying, "The horrible attack in Parramatta is a cold blooded murder with no justification or excuses. ... We need to work collaboratively tackling radicalisation among the youth with federal and state governments."

On 13 October 2015, the New South Wales government requested legal changes to allow control orders on people aged 14 and over. George Brandis the Attorney-General for Australia agreed to the changes. The same day, Malcolm Turnbull, Bill Shorten and Richard Di Natale attended a press conference for an interfaith group called National Day of Unity.

The chairman of Parramatta mosque gave a speech during Friday prayers on 9 October 2015 saying "We reject terrorism." The Grand Mufti of Australia, Dr Ibrahim Abu Mohamed, condemned the shooting but refused to call the incident an act of terror without "more information" and until "it's proven to be a terrorist act". A statement by the Australian Federal Police to the ABC's Media Watch program said that "emotive headlines" in sensationalised news reports can "help extremists amplify their deliberate strategy to incite fear and hate."

The ISIL propaganda magazine Dabiq described Jabar as a "brave knight".

== See also ==
- 2014 Endeavour Hills stabbings
- 2014 Sydney hostage crisis
- Islam in Australia
- List of terrorist incidents, 2015
- List of terrorist incidents in Australia
- List of Islamist terrorist attacks
