= 2014 Australian counter-terrorism raids =

Counter-terrorism raids in 2014 in Australia

On the morning of 18 September 2014, police in Australia carried out the biggest counter-terrorism operation in the nation's history, with over 800 heavily armed officers targeting households in the cities of Sydney and Brisbane. It came days after the Australian government raised the terror threat from medium to high due to concerns about Australian citizens returning to the country after fighting with the Islamic State of Iraq and the Levant (ISIL). Following the raids, two people were charged, one with terrorism offences and the other for possession of an unauthorised firearm. One of the two arrestees became one of only two men on remand at the highest security prison in Australia, as he is considered an "AA" security risk.

== Raids ==
Authorities raided 25 homes in Bass Hill, Revesby, Regents Park and elsewhere. The raids were triggered after the interception of one phone call. Computers, documents and a firearm were collected during the raid. Fifteen people were detained and eleven people were subsequently charged with terrorism offences.

== Allegations ==
Prime Minister Tony Abbott stated that a senior Australian member of ISIL, Mohammad Ali Baryalei, had called for "demonstration killings" including a public beheading. Omarjan Azari, 22, was charged with conspiring to commit these acts and with "attempting to make funds available to a terrorist organization.". He was held in Australia's maximum security prison, Goulburn Correctional Centre in the High Risk Management Unit, the first person on remand ever sent there, and there are Federal Court "control orders" that prohibit certain people from communicating with him.

== Supreme Court trial ==
Prior to his Supreme Court trial, in December 2015 Azari pled guilty to trying to provide funds to Islamic State. The Supreme Court trial of Azari that had convened in late April 2017 was aborted by a Justice, as some of the accused in the separate 2015 Parramatta shooting also figure in the Azari case, and the judge considered the jury may be prejudiced. A new trial for Azari was to begin in November 2017. In 2018 he was found guilty of two terrorism offences, including funding Islamic State. In March 2016 Azari was sentenced to 18 years jail.

== Motivations ==
The cancellation of passports of those wanting to fight overseas for extremists causes as well as resentment towards Australia's role in the recent wars in Afghanistan and Iraq have been raised as possible motivations behind the alleged terrorist planning. After the raids, Imraan Husain, an Imam from the Gold Coast, warned that sending troops to the Middle East could marginalise local Muslim youth, especially those who follow jihadists on social media.

== Protest ==
Between 200 and 400 Muslims in Sydney protested the raids at Lakemba railway station the night after the morning raids. The protesters, organised by Hizb ut-Tahrir, cited "police brutality" and "political hysteria". Wassim Doureihi, a prominent member of the group, said "Let me say clearly even if a single bomb went off even if a thousand bombs went off in this country all it will prove is that Muslims are angry."

== See also ==
- Terrorism in Australia
- Military intervention against ISIL
  - Operation Okra
