= 1995 French consulate bombing in Perth =

Terror attack in 1995 in Perth, Western Australia

French Consulate firebombing in Perth
- Location: Colin Street, West Perth, Western Australia
- Date: 17 June 1995; 4:40 a.m. (AWST)
- Attack type: Arson, eco-terrorism
- Weapon: Two Molotov cocktails
- Deaths: 0
- Injuries: 0
- Perpetrators: Bosco Boscovich; Maya Catts
- Motive: Opposition to France's nuclear testing

On 17 June 1995, the French Consulate in Colin Street, West Perth, Western Australia was firebombed and destroyed. The act was a violent protest against French nuclear testing in the Pacific. Within six months, two individuals identifying as the previously unknown Pacific Popular Front were arrested and convicted of wilful and unlawful damage.

== Details ==
Around 4:40am Saturday morning, 17 June 1995, neighbours called emergency services to report hearing explosions at the French consulate. The consulate was located in West Perth, in a converted single-storey Federation-style house, about 90 years old with brick walls and a largely timber interior. Fire services responded within four minutes and the fire took one hour to completely extinguish. The building was destroyed, and there were no injuries. The site was investigated by detectives from the arson squad, with damage estimated at A$300,000 by fire services.

Some suspected the firebombing was linked to France's decision to resume nuclear testing on Mururoa Atoll in the Pacific Ocean, announced by President Jacques Chirac on Tuesday that week. Police Chief Superintendent Fred Zagami said police had taken "pro-active security steps in regard to the French consulate" on Wednesday, and nearly 100 people attended a peaceful demonstration outside the consulate on Friday. Honorary French consul Dr Robert Pearce, a plastic surgeon whose consulting rooms and patient records were housed in the consulate, told the media he believed the fire was a protest against nuclear testing.

"We have to accept that in a democracy Australians have as much right as people in other parts of the world to demonstrate, but they shouldn't demonstrate by damaging or destroying other people's life. And this to me is an attack, a personal attack, as much as an attack on something that represents another sovereign state." - Honorary French consul Robert Pearce, 17 June 1995.

The French embassy in Canberra described the fire as "a series of criminal explosions" and "an unjustifiable criminal act which could have had tragic consequences". Australian Prime Minister Paul Keating said "if it is proved that this action is a violent protest against the resumption of French nuclear testing in the South Pacific, it must be condemned for the extreme form it has taken", and intentional destruction of property was "not part of the Australian way of life and must be rejected on every occasion." Bob McMullan, Australia's Acting Foreign Minister, advised the media to show restraint and discourage "copy-cat incidents". Western Australia's Premier, Richard Court, said the fire was "an act of terrorism which we don't accept in this country".

Later that day, a group named the Pacific Popular Front claimed responsibility for the fire. Sergeant Chris Ferris, the WA Police media liaison officer, said that a male telephoned all newspapers and television stations in Perth and SBS in Sydney and read them a message. SBS reporter Jane Willcox said the caller told them, "The Pacific Popular Front is claiming responsibility for fire-bombing the French embassy [sic]. It was an attack on their belligerence." Sergeant Ferris said the police force had not previously heard of the Pacific Popular Front.

== Arrests ==
On 4 July 1995, 20-year-old Bosco Boscovich and 21-year-old Maya Catts were arrested and charged with causing "damage by fire", after allegedly starting the fire with two Molotov cocktails. Police traced one of the phone calls made to reporters to a house in Victoria Park. Police said the two friends acted alone, unconnected to the anti-nuclear movement, and the Pacific Popular Front did not exist.

Boscovich, a Zimbabwean-born Australian citizen and Curtin University student formerly known as Michael Joseph Keenan, pleaded guilty on 21 July 1995 to arson, and was sentenced on 28 August 1995 to three years jail with eligibility for parole. The fire was started when two Molotov cocktails, made using glass wine bottles, cloth and $1.25 worth of petrol, were thrown through two of the building's windows. Judge Antoinette Kennedy said Boscovich wanted to make the French aware of opposition to their nuclear testing, but he did not expect to cause so much damage, estimated at $256,000.

Catts, an unemployed dual Australian-Israeli citizen, pleaded guilty to wilful and unlawful damage on 3 November 1995. On 1 December 1995, she was sentenced to 12 months, which was doubled on appeal on 20 March 1996 to two years jail.

== See also ==
- Terrorism in Australia
- Bunbury woodchip bombing (1976)
