= Willie Brigitte =

French criminal

Willie Virgile Brigitte
- Born: 10 October 1968 (age 58); Guadeloupe, an overseas territory of France
- Motive: Islamist terrorism
- Conviction: Guilty
- Criminal charge: Associating with criminals in relation to a terrorist enterprise
- Penalty: 9 years jail

Willie Virgile Brigitte (also known as Mohammed Abderrahman, born 10 October 1968 in Guadeloupe, France) is a convicted criminal, who was deported from Australia in 2003 for breaching the terms of his tourist visa and, upon arrival in France, was charged and convicted in Paris in 2007 for associating with criminals in relation to a terrorist enterprise, including a plot to damage the Lucas Heights High Flux Australian Reactor and the Holsworthy Barracks, both located in Sydney, Australia. Brigitte served a custodial sentence of nine years in a French correctional facility, was released in 2009, but then rearrested in 2012.

Brigitte is a French convert to Islam who associated with al-Qaeda.

== Background ==
Brigitte was born on the Caribbean island of Guadeloupe, an overseas territory of France. He moved to Paris for his final year of schooling, but chose to join the navy instead of sitting for the baccalaureate. He served for three years, though deserted the military twice.

After returning to civilian life in 1993, he worked in a variety of jobs, and had stints as a butcher, social worker, printer, drug rehabilitation facilitator, teacher and warehouse worker. He read widely, including the Qur'an, and at the age of 30, in 1998, he decided to embrace Islam in full. Brigitte adopted several new names, including Mohammed Abderrahman, Mohammed Ibrahim Abderrahman, Abou Maimouna, Salahouddin, Jamal and 'Abderrahman the West Indian'. He attended an Islamic school in Yemen.

== Terrorism links ==
=== Recruited to Al Qaeda ===
Brigitte attended the Omar and Abou Bakr mosques in the poor and largely immigrant Paris neighborhood of Couronnes, where he studied both Islam and Arabic. The mosques were infamous for preaching a mixture of militant and puritanical Islamist dogma, infused with anti-imperialist and anti-Western sentiments. It was in Couronnes that Brigitte came in contact with persons with links to the Algerian-based Salafist Group for Preaching and Combat. He was taken on oddly strenuous camping trips, believed by French intelligence to be designed by Islamist recruiters to identify suitable fighters. It is believed he helped procure two Belgian passports, which were used by two assassins who managed to get close to, and kill, Afghan Northern Alliance warlord Ahmed Shah Massoud.

Brigitte headed to Afghanistan in 2001 after the 9/11 attacks to assist the Taliban. He was prevented from entering Afghanistan due to the war, and instead spent four months training in a Lashkar-e-Taiba camp in Pakistan, where he received instruction in weapons handling and explosives. Sajid Mir, a retired Pakistan Army Major, ISI operative and LET terrorist responsible for managing foreigners in LET, marked him as a potential al-Qaeda operative.

In early 2002 Brigitte returned to Paris. Keeping a low profile, he shunned contact with his family and lived in a hostel with Ibrahim Keita, another convert to Islam who Brigitte met on the various camping expeditions organized by the Couronnes mosques. Brigitte was reticent to him as well, and Keita became suspicious when Brigitte asked if he could borrow his driving licence. In May 2003, Brigitte left Paris for Australia, using a ticket provided to him by Mir. He did not tell Keita where he was going.

=== In Australia ===
Brigitte is alleged to have stayed with Faheem Khalid Lodhi, better known as Abu Hamza, a Pakistani-born, Australian-naturalized contact of Mir, living in South-western Sydney. He worked at a halal restaurant in the center of Sydney, and along with fraternising with a select number of associates of Hamza, he kept in constant contact with Mir by phone. Brigitte also had an interest in aboriginal issues, and he joined and trained at a gym run by Tony Mundine (father of the Australian boxer Anthony Mundine). Hamza for his part continued working as an architect, but also made queries about acquiring large quantities of ammonium nitrate, an ingredient to make a bomb.

In order to stay longer in Australia, he sought a marriage of convenience with Melanie Brown, who was introduced through mutual acquaintances in the Islamic community. Brown, like Brigitte, was a convert to Islam, and had served in the Australian Army as a signaller in East Timor. She took her conversion to Islam quite seriously, and was eager to marry a Muslim man, although Abu Hamza saw her as a possible security risk and somebody who would take up space in his apartment. Ten days after meeting each other, Brigitte and Brown were married in an Islamic ceremony on 30 August 2003.

Brigitte aggressively sought information from Brown about the Australian Army, its equipment and its operations, including details of the Pine Gap joint defence facility. Brown, aware of her obligations not to pass on classified information, managed not to pass on anything substantially secret – she took the precaution of destroying her notebooks of her time in East Timor. Brigitte and Hamza were often busy liaising with other associates in the Islamic community, and kept Brown at arm's length.

=== Arrest and deportation ===
The Direction de la surveillance du territoire (DST), France's internal security agency, had been passively monitoring 'Abderrahman the West Indian' since 1998. After fellow members of the Couronnes terror cell were found fighting for al-Qaeda in Afghanistan investigations on others was stepped up. It wasn't until 3 September 2003 that the pseudonym 'Abderrahman the West Indian' was connected with Willie Brigitte. On 16 September 2003 French intelligence identified that Brigitte had bought a one-way ticket to Australia, and six days later the Australian embassy was notified by mail about Brigitte and his background, seeking confirmation that Brigitte was still in Australia. Thinking that it was a routine trace request, the Australian authorities did not immediately respond. Impatient, ten days later the French sent a secondary communication – this time directly to the Australian Security Intelligence Organisation (ASIO), Australia's security intelligence body. The message arrived at ASIO headquarters on the eve of the Labour Day long weekend; and the information was not actioned until the next business day.

Brigitte was promptly arrested on grounds of breaching the non-employment stipulations of his tourist visa, and sent to Villawood Immigration Detention Centre. He was held incommunicado, and was interviewed by ASIO officers. Brigitte was largely uncooperative though he was represented by his lawyer Harry Durimel. Abu Hamza was put under surveillance. Brigitte was subsequently deported and sent back to France that month, where he was arrested on arrival. When his arrest became public the Australian authorities moved against Hamza and several of his associates, arresting them in a series of dawn raids in Sydney's south west. In 2006 Hamza was sentenced to twenty years' imprisonment after being found guilty of planning a terrorist attack on Australia's electricity grid.

Brigitte's case came to trial in February 2007, charged under French law with "associating with criminals in relation to a terrorist enterprise". On 15 March 2007 he was found guilty and sentenced to nine years in prison. Released in 2009, and then rearrested in 2012, in 2015 Brigitte was alleged to have links associated with the Charlie Hebdo shooting.

== Personal life ==
Brigitte's first marriage was to a Syrian Muslim woman, with whom he had one child. At the time, neither of them was particularly religious. They divorced in 1996. He married for a second time in 1999. The marriage resulted in two children. Melanie Brown and Willie Brigitte eventually also divorced. The couple had two children together, and the divorce was confirmed by Brigitte's lawyer in 2004, who stated that Brigitte's wife (Melanie Brown) had advised him of the divorce.

== See also ==
- Islamist terrorism
- List of notable converts to Islam
- Terrorism in Australia
