= 2014 Endeavour Hills stabbings =

Terror attack in 2014 in Melbourne, Australia

- Haider's Facebook profile picture four days before the stabbings
- Location: 37°58′33″S 145°15′43″E; Outside Endeavour Hills police station
- Date: 23 September 2014; 7:45 p.m. (AEST, UTC+10:00)
- Target: Australian counter-terrorism police officers
- Attack type: Stabbing attack
- Weapon: Two knives
- Deaths: 1 (the perpetrator)
- Injuries: 2
- Perpetrator: Abdul Numan Haider
- Motive: Sunni Islamic fundamentalism

On 23 September 2014, 18-year-old Abdul Numan Haider attacked two counter-terrorism police officers with a knife outside the Victoria Police Endeavour Hills station located in Endeavour Hills, a suburb of Melbourne, Victoria, Australia. He was then shot dead.

== Perpetrator ==
Haider lived in Narre Warren, Victoria, and was of Afghan descent. He began attending lectures at the fundamentalist Al-Furqan mosque. He was also believed to be connected to prominent Islamic State recruits Neil Prakash and Sevdet Besim.

Haider was one of between 40 and 50 Australian citizens who had had their passports cancelled due to fears that they would join the Islamic State of Iraq and the Levant.

The Australian Security Intelligence Organisation (ASIO) had been monitoring his rapid radicalisation, which took place during a period of only a few months, but had not judged him dangerous.

== Attack ==
Haider is reported to have gone to the police station to discuss his cancelled passport. Two police officers from the Joint Counter-Terrorism Team (JCTT), one from Victoria Police and the other from the Australian Federal Police (AFP), approached him in the car park. Haider produced a knife and slashed the Victorian officer across the arm. He turned on the AFP officer and first stabbed him in the face and chest. When the AFP officer collapsed, Haider climbed on top of him and repeatedly stabbed him. The first officer, who had been slashed across the arm, ordered Haider to drop the weapon, then shot him fatally in the head.

Haider was carrying two knives and the Black Standard flag.

== Reaction ==
Australian Prime Minister Tony Abbott, whom Haider had allegedly threatened during the stabbing, stated, "Obviously this indicates that there are people in our community who are capable of very extreme acts. It also indicates that the police will be constantly vigilant to protect us against people who will do Australians harm."

Three days before the attack, ISIL propagandist Abu Mohammad al-Adnani gave a speech calling for ISIL sympathisers to attack countries including Australia. Professor Greg Barton of Melbourne's Monash University Global Terrorism Research Centre stated his opinion that the attack was not inspired by the message. He called for community engagement to prevent attacks from people suspected of terrorism.

Victoria's police commissioner stated that bag searches would mean longer queuing for the 2014 AFL Grand Final at Melbourne Cricket Ground on 27 September.

The Age newspaper put a photograph of an innocent man, Abu Bakar Alam, on the front page, mistakenly identifying him as the perpetrator of the attack. As part of the settlement the newspaper donated $20,000 towards building a mosque in Doveton, Victoria.

An inquest into Haider's death began on 7 March 2016.

In 2017, U.S. President Donald Trump listed this stabbing as an example of an "under-reported" terrorist attack.

== See also ==
- Stabbing as a terrorist tactic
- 2015 Parramatta shooting
- List of Islamic terrorist attacks
- List of terrorist incidents, 2014
- 2014 Tours police station stabbing
- 2017 Queanbeyan stabbing attacks
