= 2017 Australian aeroplane bomb plot =

Thwarted terror attack in 2017 on a flight departing Sydney, Australia

Four suspects were arrested without charge by Australian Federal Police on 29 July 2017 in Sydney on suspicion of an Islamic State inspired plot to plant a bomb on an Etihad Airways flight departing Sydney on 15 July 2017.

== Plot ==
Two Lebanese–Australian brothers, Khaled Khayat (49) and Mahmoud Khayat (32) were charged with "preparing for, or planning, a terrorist attack". The plan was to detonate an improvised explosive device (IED) concealed in a suitcase twenty minutes into an Abu-Dhabi-bound flight with 400 passengers aboard. The plot was prevented at the airport check-in counter when a passenger attempted to check in a bag that was suspiciously heavy. The IEDs were shipped international cargo from ISIS members to the plotters in Australia. The two brothers charged in the case are said to have a brother, Tarek, who is a senior member of the Islamic State in Raqqa. The IEDs inside the luggage were concealed inside a meat grinder and a Barbie doll.

Lebanese Interior Minister Nohad Machnouk said Lebanese authorities had been monitoring the brothers for over a year, and that they coordinated their activities with their Australian counterparts. According to Machnouk, the plot was foiled because the luggage was overweight, and that the plot may have succeeded if the weight limit had not been exceeded. According to Machnouk, the alleged motive was to punish the United Arab Emirates and Australia for being part of the US-led coalition against Islamic State.

On 29 July 2017, the Australian Federal Police conducted raids on five properties in response to suspicion of an Islamist inspired terrorist attack plot on an aeroplane. Four suspects were arrested and authorities sought a court ruling to hold the men for the duration of the property searches before laying any potential charges. A woman in Surry Hills denied that her son or husband had any links to terrorism.

The Prime Minister of Australia, Malcolm Turnbull, said the raids were a major joint counter-terrorism operation. Andrew Colvin, the Australian Federal Police Commissioner, told reporters at a news conference: "In recent days, law enforcement has become aware of information that suggested some people in Sydney were planning to commit a terrorist attack using an IED (improvised explosive device)," adding that specific information was not yet available and that the investigation will be "long and protracted". According to Michael Phelan, Federal Police (AFP) Deputy Commissioner, the plan was "one of the most sophisticated plots that has ever been attempted on Australian soil". On 3 August, one suspect was released and three remained detained while property searches continued.

Airport security measures were increased at major airports throughout Australia in response to the possible threat.

Following an announcement by the Prime Minister of Israel, Benjamin Netanyahu, Minister for Immigration and Border Protection Peter Dutton announced in Canberra on 20 February 2018 that the information used to thwart the plot was supplied by Unit 8200, a branch of the military intelligence agency Aman.

== Sentences ==
On 17 December 2019, Khaled Khayat was sentenced by Justice Christine Adamson to 40 years in prison (non-parole period of 30 years). Mahmoud Khayat was sentenced to 36 years (non-parole period of 27 years).

Amer Khayat was the third brother, who was unknowingly to carry the bomb onto the plane. Amer was arrested overseas and spent two and a half years in a Beirut prison. In September 2019, he was cleared of any involvement by a military tribunal. According to Justice Adamson, his brothers "disapproved of him because he drank, went clubbing, gambled and was gay which they regarded as bringing shame on the family."

== See also ==
- Terrorism in Australia
