= 2017 Queanbeyan stabbing attacks =

Terror attack in 2017 in Queanbeyan, New South Wales, Australia

2017 Queanbeyan stabbings
- Location: Queanbeyan, Australia
- Date: 6–7 April 2017
- Target: Civilians
- Attack type: terrorist attack
- Deaths: 1
- Injuries: 3
- Perpetrators: 15/16-year-old boys
- Motive: Islamic extremism

On 6–7 April 2017, two teenage boys aged 15 and 16 went on a rampage in Queanbeyan, New South Wales, Australia, first stabbing a service station attendant to death, then violently attacking four people in a spree that continued for several hours. The attacks were investigated by Australia's Joint Counter-Terrorism Task Force as a possible terrorism-related crime. On 1 May 2020 both males were sentenced. The older received a jail term of 35 years and 6 months, while the younger received 18 years and 4 months.

== Attack ==
Shortly before midnight on 6 April 2017, two boys attacked a service station attendant at Queanbeyan with a steak knife. The victim died at the scene. His death was the start of a violent crime spree that continued for 14 hours.

The letters "I S" were written in blood on the wall of the service station. Based on DNA evidence, police confirmed that the letters were written in the victim's blood.

The two also assaulted a man in a park, and broke into the home of a man they knew, bashing him with a tyre iron, and planning to steal money. Then, in the early hours of 7 April 2017, the two flagged down a driver, who took them for youths in need of assistance. One teen held a steak knife with blood on it, and bragged about having used the blood of his earlier victim to scrawl on a wall before stabbing the driver in the stomach as his companion bashed him with a hammer.

After a car chase on 7 April 2017, the two were arrested near Gilmore A.C.T. on the Monaro Highway. On 8 April they appeared at the ACT Children's Court. They were ordered to be extradited to appear at the Children's Court of New South Wales.

== Suspects and legal proceedings ==
The two suspects refused to appear at the Children's Court hearing on 28 June 2017 where they were charged with murder, robbery, wounding with intent to cause bodily harm, aggravated break and enter and aggravated car theft. All possible motives were investigated, including mental illness, substance abuse and terrorism. The 16-year-old was believed to have a history of mental illness and to have been a user of crystal methamphetamine. One of the suspects continued to shout Allahu Akbar after he was arrested. According to authorities, the 16-year-old posted radical material online in the weeks leading to the attack. One local police officer told the press that "we’re told the 16-year-old has been influenced by ISIS and has been on Facebook with ISIS propaganda." NSW Police Deputy Commissioner Catherine Burn said: "We have two teenagers in custody and sufficient information to believe the actions of one of those teenagers may be related to terrorism." Friends and family of a victim of the attack cast doubts on an Islamist motivation behind the attack as the victim was a Muslim.

The 16-year-old suspect was held in a juvenile justice centre. He repeatedly threatened to rape and stab prison officers "in the name of Allah." The 15-year-old, held at a different juvenile justice centre, was said to be behaving.

The two were charged with the stabbing murder of the service station employee, carjacking, and a malicious assault during the spree that lasted several hours. On 28 June 2019 a magistrate lifted a "a non-publication and suppression order" that had prevented media coverage of court proceedings. In lifting the order, the magistrate questioned the justification for imposing it in the first place, asserting that open courts are a foundation of justice. The magistrate allowed police additional time to investigate. Forensic investigations proceeded over objections from the suspects' attorney. Briefs were due to be served in the cases against both suspects by 18 September 2019. Both cases were scheduled to return to court on 25 October 2019.

By 23 September 2019, after initially refusing to, both suspects had pleaded guilty, and the trial was aborted. The younger admitted guilt the prior week, and the older, now 19 years old, admitted to murder, robbery, another stabbing and car theft.

=== Sentences ===
On 1 May 2020 at the NSW Supreme Court, both males were sentenced. The older received a jail term of 35 years and 6 months. The younger received 18 years and 4 months.

== Victims ==
A 29-year-old Pakistani national living in Australia was stabbed to death in the petrol station where he worked. Arrangements were made to send his body home to Pakistan for burial.

Another victim was stabbed in the chest in Karabar after he pulled his car over to the side of the road to see if someone needed help when the two boys flagged him down. He survived critical injuries.

The suspects struck a third victim in the head with a beer bottle and a fourth victim with a tyre iron, all the same night as the killing of the petrol station attendant.

== Impact ==
This attack is one of a series of recent Islamist-inspired attacks in Australia that have led to dramatic increases in security precautions, including the installation of hundreds of security bollards.

The violent behaviour of the 16-year-old suspect in prison has led to a public conversation about the need to create a maximum security prison for violent teens.

== Response ==
Prime Minister Malcolm Turnbull described the attack as shocking and a matter which underlines many of the concerns raised in this field, further stating that police had uncovered evidence of "sufficient concern" to require the involvement of the joint counter-terrorism police team.

== See also ==
- Manson Family
- Stabbing as a terrorist tactic
- List of terrorist incidents in April 2017
- List of terrorist incidents in Australia
