= Sydney Israeli Consulate and Hakoah Club bombings =

Terror attack in 1982 in Sydney, Australia

The bombing of the Israeli Consulate and Hakoah Club in Sydney occurred on 23 December 1982. The two bombings occurred on the same day within five hours of each other. The initial case led to a single arrest, although charges were later dropped. In 2011, New South Wales Police and Australian Federal Police reopened the case, citing new leads. The bombing was one of a number of attacks that have been conducted against Israeli embassies and diplomats.

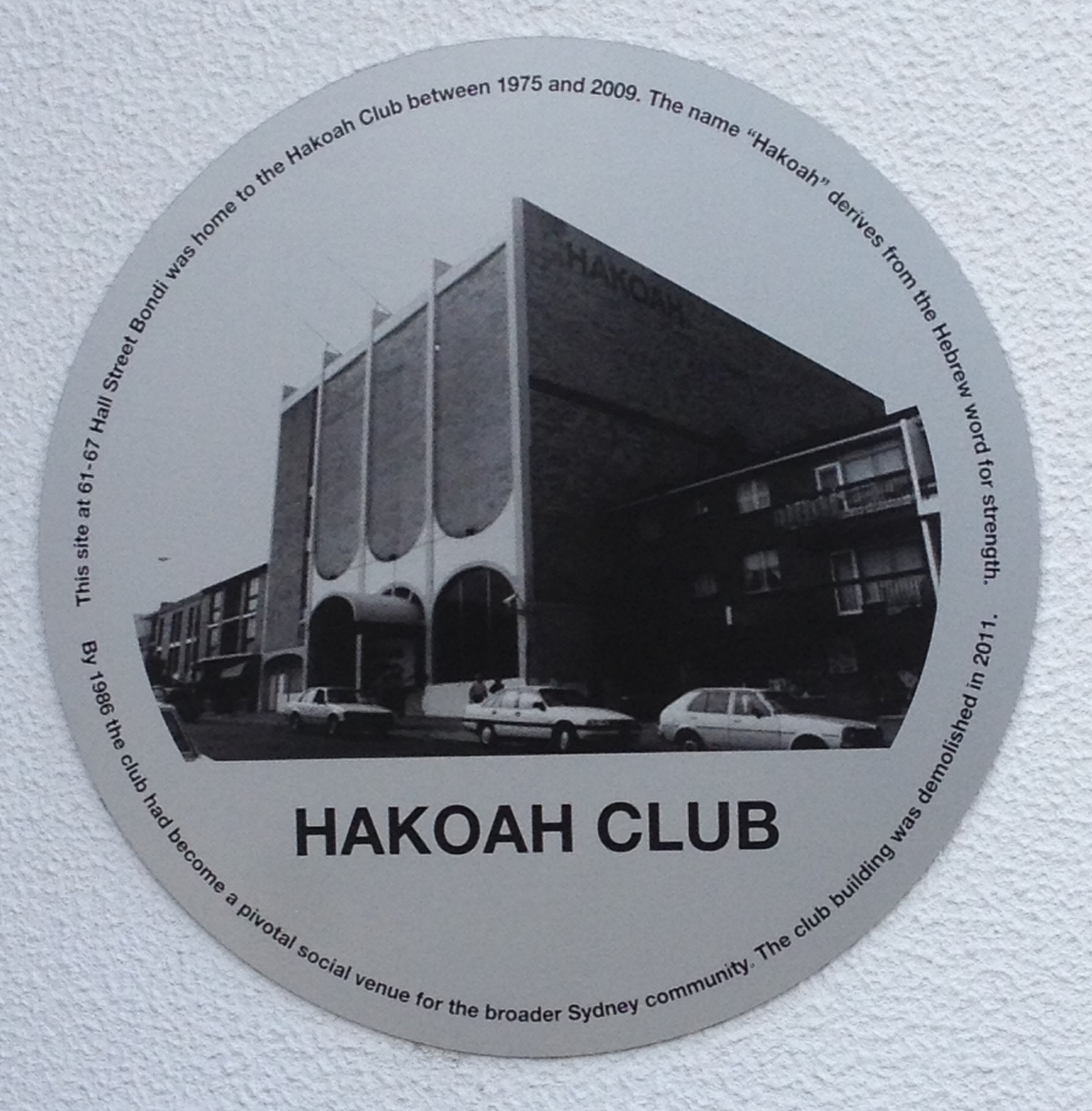
Public plaque commemorating the Hakoah Club in Bondi Beach

== Events ==
On 23 December 1982, at around 2:00 pm, an explosive device was detonated near the fire exit door of the Israeli Consulate General on 80 William Street, Sydney. The force of the blast injured two people and significant damage was caused to the consulate building. At around 6.45 pm on that same day, a second explosive device was detonated inside a vehicle parked outside of the Hakoah Club on 61–67 Hall Street, Bondi Beach, NSW. The bomb did not detonate properly, and the resulting explosion injured no one; however, three vehicles were significantly damaged, including the one used to store the bomb. The Hakoah Club at the time was filled with a large number of people.

According to the New South Wales Jewish Board of Deputies, the Jewish community in Australia had been sheltered from past terror threats and warned that terrorist incidents could reoccur in the future. Following the bombing, security at the Hakoah club was tightened.

== Investigation ==
Initial police investigations led to the arrest of a 31-year-old man who was charged in relation to the Hakoah Club explosion. The case went before the court; however, charges were later withdrawn by the NSW Attorney General.

=== Re-investigation ===
In 2012, the case of the two bombings was reopened after police had discovered new leads. The case was assigned to the Joint Counter-Terrorism Team (JCTT) in Sydney, under "Operation Forbearance." The police stated that they "believe there are still people in the community who know those responsible for these bombings." The investigation revealed connections to Palestinian militant groups led by Husayn Muhammed al-Umari, based on emerging evidence and intelligence linking him to the attack.

== See also ==
- Terrorism in Australia
