= Call tracing =

In telecommunications, call tracing is a procedure that permits an entitled user to be informed about the routing of data for an established connection, identifying the entire route from the origin to the destination.

There are two types of call tracing. Permanent call tracing permits tracing of all calls. On-demand call tracing permits tracing, upon request, of a specific call, provided that the called party dials a designated code immediately after the call to be traced is disconnected.
