= Abdul Nacer Benbrika =

Algerian terrorist

- Born: c. 1960 (age 65–66); Aflou, Algeria
- Occupation: Muslim cleric
- Status: Released
- Conviction: Guilty on 15 September 2008
- Criminal charges: Intentionally being the leader and a member of a terrorist organisation
- Penalty: 15 years' jail with a non-parole period of 12 years

Abdul Nacer Benbrika (Arabic: عبد الناصر بن بريكة) (born in Algeria c. 1960), also known as Abu Bakr (Arabic: أبو بكر), is a convicted criminal, who served a custodial sentence of fifteen years, with a non-parole period of twelve years, for intentionally being the leader and a member of a terrorist organisation. Benbrika was one of 17 men arrested in the Australian cities of Sydney and Melbourne in November 2005, charged with being members of a terrorist organisation and of planning terrorist attacks on targets within Australia. Benbrika is alleged to be the spiritual leader of the group. All 17 men pleaded not guilty. On 15 September 2008 Benbrika was found guilty as charged and subsequently sentenced.

Benbrika completed his sentence on 5 November 2020, but was kept in jail under an interim order from the Victorian Supreme Court requested by the Federal Government's Department of Home Affairs who applied to the court to keep him detained.

On 1 November 2023, Benbrika won his High Court bid to restore his Australian citizenship, which was cancelled in 2020, and on 19 December 2023 the Victorian Supreme Court, granted his release under a 12 month extended supervision order.

== Personal background ==
Benbrika was born in Algeria: various sources give his age as 45 or 46 as of November 2005. He was trained as an aircraft engineer. He arrived in Australia in May 1989 on a one-month visitor's permit, on which he twice gained extensions, and settled in the northern suburbs of Melbourne, an area with a large Muslim population. After his permit expired in 1990 he became a prohibited non-citizen, then spent the next six years fighting through the Immigration Review Tribunal appeals process, for the right to stay. During his hearings he told the tribunal of his "love of the Australian lifestyle".

In 1992, Benbrika married a Lebanese woman who was an Australian citizen, with whom he had seven children. He was granted Australian residence in 1996 and became a citizen in 1998, although he is reported to have retained his Algerian citizenship as well. He had been on government welfare benefits for some years and this has become a topic of debate.

== Standing in the Muslim community ==
His teachings became increasingly politicised after the US-led invasions of Afghanistan and Iraq. This came at a time when the Muslim community was under intense scrutiny from the Australian government and media outlets.

Benbrika was said to have been a teacher and a deputy-leader at the Islamic Information & Support Centre of Australia led by Mohammed Omran who, as Sheikh Abu Ayman, also led the Ahlus Sunnah Wal Jamaah Association. Omran has denied that he had close ties with Benbrika.

Benbrika began teaching smaller groups on a less formal basis after he refused the requests of more formal organisations that he tone down his teachings.

Islamic Council of Victoria board member Waleed Aly said Benbrika's group was "a splinter of a splinter of a splinter. Most Muslims had never heard of him until he appeared on the Australian Broadcasting Corporation's 7.30 Report." Waleed Aly was quoted as saying. "... He formed his own group with a handful of young men who he calls his students." Benbrika's students included a number of those arrested along with him in November, one of whom is alleged to have undergone military training in Afghanistan.

== Terrorism ==
Benbrika came to public attention when he told an Australian ABC interviewer: "Osama bin Laden, he is a great man. Osama bin Laden was a great man before 11 September, which they said he did it, until now nobody knows who did it." He was quoted as defending Muslims fighting against coalition forces in Iraq and Afghanistan, and said anyone who fought in the name of God would be forgiven their sins. "According to my religion, jihad is a part of my religion and what you have to understand is that anyone who fights for the sake of Allah, when he dies, the first drop of blood that comes from him out all his sin will be forgiven."

During 2004 and 2005 Australian security agencies had Benbrika under surveillance as a possible instigator of terrorist acts. In March his passport was withdrawn on advice from the Australian Security Intelligence Organisation (ASIO), and ASIO officers raided his Melbourne home in June. In November, according to media reports, ASIO became convinced that Benbrika's group, and an affiliated group in Sydney, was actively planning a terrorist attack. It was at this time that the federal government was introducing new anti-terrorism legislation, the Australian Anti-Terrorism Act 2005. It is said that on the advice of ASIO, the Australian Parliament amended the law relating to terrorism, broadening the definition of planning 'a' terrorist act. A few days later police raids in Sydney and Melbourne arrested Benbrika and 16 other men, one of whom was shot after allegedly opening fire on police in Sydney. It has also been said that the timing of the arrests was planned to coincide with the new laws.

Benbrika and his 12 fellow defendants (including Shane Kent, Fadal Sayadi, Ahmed Raad, Amer Haddara, Abdulla Merhi, Ezzit Raad, Hany Taha and Aimen Joud) appeared in a Melbourne magistrates' court the day after their arrest. All are of Muslim immigrant backgrounds except Kent, who is a convert. Benbrika was charged with "directing the activities of a terrorist organisation." He did not apply for bail and was remanded in custody. Several of his fellow defendants applied for bail on numerous occasions during their pre-trial remand detention in the maximum security Acacia Unit of Barwon Prison, from November 2005 until their trial began in February 2008.

Benbrika also had links to the defendants in the 2005 Sydney terrorism plot, Khaled Cheikho, Moustafa Cheikho, Mohamed Ali Elomar, Abdul Rakib Hasan and Mohammed Omar Jamal.

Government and police officials said the group was stockpiling chemicals that could have been used to make explosives, but they had not been charged with this offence. According to the Melbourne Herald Sun, the group was "plotting a terrorist spectacular on the scale of the al-Qaeda attacks on London and Madrid." The explosive device they were assembling was called the "Mother of Satan" by the jihadists. Victorian police commissioner Christine Nixon said she believed the arrests, which came after 16 months of police surveillance, had "seriously disrupted the activities of a group intent on carrying out a terrorist attack". The raids were planned after new information was obtained, she said. She said although the group had no known specific target, "We were concerned that the attack was imminent, and we believe that we have sufficient evidence that will go before the courts to show that."

In an interview before his arrest, Benbrika denied he was involved in terrorist activities. "I am not involved in anything here," he said. "I am teaching my brothers here the Koran and the Sunnah, and I am trying my best to keep myself, my family, my kids and the Muslims close to their religion."

In company with the other defendants, Benbrika appeared in a Melbourne court in March 2007, under extremely strict security. The proceedings of the case were subject to severe reporting restrictions in Victoria.

== Trial ==
The trial of Benbrika began in October 2007. He and eleven other accused were charged of terrorism offences. The case was presided over by Justice Bernard Bongiorno and was initially prosecuted by Nick Robinson, but later trials included Richard Maidment SC as prosecutor. Benbrika was represented in court by Remy Van de Weil QC, instructed by solicitor Josh Taaffe.

At a hearing in February 2008, the prosecution in its opening remarks outlined the details of 500 phone conversations, recorded by telephone intercepts and hidden listening devices, between Benbrika and the 11 men in his group also on trial. Prosecutors alleged phone records revealed the group's plans: "to cause maximum damage. To cause the death of a thousand ... by use of a bomb."

They allege the group led by Benbrika was "bent on violent jihad" and "planned terrorist attacks on football games or train stations to maximise deaths" and that Benbrika said that in some cases it was theologically permissible to "kill women, children and the elderly".

The court was told how Benbrika allegedly used at least 10 different mobile phones that were registered under false names and addresses.

The jury in the case retired to consider its verdict on 20 August 2008. On 15 September Benbrika was found guilty on the charge of intentionally being the leader and a member of a terrorist organisation.

On 3 February 2009 Supreme Court Justice Bernard Bongiorno sentenced Benbrika to 15 years' jail with a non-parole period of 12 years. In his comments Bongiorno said the word jihad had many meanings in Islam, but Benbrika had warped the term to mean "only a violent attack by his group to advance the Islamic cause". Bongiorno also said evidence "suggested that Benbrika was still committed to violent jihad, had shown no contrition for his offences and had talked about continuing the group's activities behind bars if its members were jailed".

Apart from the charges of Intentionally being a member of a terrorist organisation and Intentionally directing activities of a terrorist organisation, Benbrika was also convicted in a later trial of 'Possession of a thing connected with preparation for a terrorist act'. But a further ruling in March 2011 found him not guilty of this later charge. This conviction for the offence of 'Possession of a thing connected with preparation for a terrorist act' was quashed, with the court concluding "that the trial judge had misdirected the jury as to the requirements for establishing that offence." His sentence for the charge of Intentionally being a member of a terrorist organisation was also reduced from 7 to 5 years.

Amer Hadarra, Aimen Joud, Fadl Sayadi, Abdullah Merhi, Ezzit Raad and Ahmed Raad, were also found guilty of being members of a terrorist organisation. They were all automatically paroled in 2015 after serving the minimum sentence. Hany Taha, Bassam Raad, Majed Raad and Shoue Hammoud were found not guilty.

Despite having completed his sentence on 5 November 2020, Benbrika was kept in jail until 19 December 2023 under an interim order from the Victorian Supreme Court. The Federal Department of Home Affairs had applied to the court to keep him detained.

=== Release ===
On 19 December 2023 Justice Elizabeth Hollingworth, in the Victorian Supreme Court, granted Benbrika release. He is to be kept on an extended supervision order for a year. He will have to attend both psychiatric and de-radicalisation sessions. His movements will be restricted, with limitations on who he can meet, and electronic monitoring. There are indications that he has been banned for life from entering Melbourne Cricket Ground.

== During imprisonment ==
While in jail, Benbrika has been able to exert significant influence in spreading jihadist ideology. Associates and relatives of his have died fighting for Islamic State. The Australian Federal Government decided to revoke his Australian citizenship due to his terrorism conviction. He is the first individual to have lost citizenship onshore in Australia.

Benbrika, represented by the law firm Doogue + George, challenged the validity of the part of the citizenship act which allowed his Australian citizenship to be stripped. On 1 November 2023, it was announced the High Court of Australia in a 6–1 split, found the law was invalid, restoring Benbrika's Australian citizenship.

Initially, Benbrika's sentence expired in 2020. However, he was kept in custody for three additional years on a continuing detention order. The reason for the continued detention was due to a ruling that Benbrika posed an unacceptable threat to the Australian public. In December 2023, Benbrika was ruled to have substantially progressed towards deradicalisation, Benbrika was freed and was placed on a one-year supervision order. The order expired in November 2025, and Benbrika is no longer subject to a supervision order.

== See also ==
- Islam in Australia
- Islamic organisations in Australia
- Islamic Information and Services Network of Australasia
- Islamic schools and branches
- Terrorism in Australia
