= 2005 Sydney terrorism plot =

Thwarted terror attack in 2005 in Sydney, Australia

The 2005 Sydney terrorism plot concerned a group of five men arrested in 2005 on charges of planning an act of terrorism targeting Sydney, Australia's most populous city and the capital of New South Wales. The group was found guilty on 16 October 2009 and were sentenced on 15 February 2010 for terms up to 28 years.

== Charges ==
Khaled Cheikho, Moustafa Cheikho, Mohamed Ali Elomar, Abdul Rakib Hasan, and Mohammed Omar Jamal were arrested in various neighbourhoods of Sydney and were tried in the New South Wales Supreme Court over a terror-related plot they planned between July 2004 and November 2005. Each pleaded not guilty to charges of conspiring to commit a terrorist act or acts. The final cost of the trial is expected to be more than A$10 million.

The Crown Prosecutor claimed that the men were motivated by a belief that Islam was under attack. The five allegedly had links to Abdul Nacer Benbrika, who is under arrest in Melbourne. Police searches of their homes discovered instructions on bomb-making, 28,000 rounds of ammunition (including 11,000 7.62×39mm), 12 rifles, militant Islamist literature, and footage of beheadings carried out by Islamists, and also of aircraft crashing into the World Trade Center on 11 September 2001. According to the prosecution, the men purchased explosive chemicals and guns between July 2004 and November 2005.

== Trial ==
The men were put on trial late in 2008. Closing arguments were heard on 28 July 2009. The trial took place in a specially-built high-security court building in Sydney. Prosecutor Richard Maidment claimed that the five men wanted "violent jihad which involved the application of extreme force and violence, including the killing of those who did not share the fundamentalist... extremist, beliefs". A mistrial was almost declared when the defence asked for the jury to be dismissed; it was discovered that a young woman, who was a relative of one of the accused, had been coming to court and reportedly writing down descriptions of the jurors. However, the jurors said it would not affect their deliberations and the judge allowed the trial to continue.

=== Verdict and sentencing ===
The five were found guilty on 16 October 2009. The trial was one of Australia's longest and involved approximately 300 witnesses and 3,000 exhibits, including 18 hours of telephone intercepts and 30 days of surveillance tapes, which has overtaken the record previously held by the liquidation of Bell Group. Outside the court, supporters of the five men shouted in protest and anger after they watched the ruling on an outdoor screen.

The perpetrators were jailed on 15 February 2010 for terms ranging from 23 to 28 years, as follows:

- Khaled Cheikho – 27 years
- Moustafa Cheikho – 26 years
- Mohamed Ali Elomar – 28 years
- Abdul Rakib Hasan – 26 years
- Mohammed Omar Jamal – 23 years

In December 2014 before the New South Wales Court of Criminal Appeal, all five men lost an appeal against both their conviction and their sentences.

== See also ==
- Terrorism in Australia
