= Jake Bilardi =

Australian suicide bomber (1996–2015)

- Born: Jake Bilardi; 1 December 1996; Craigieburn, Victoria, Australia
- Died: 11 March 2015 (aged 18); Ramadi, Iraq
- Cause of death: Suicide bombing
- Other names: Abu Abdullah al-Australi; Jihad Jake
- Years active: 2014 – 2015
- Known for: Coordinated suicide bombing in Ramadi, Iraq
- Military career
- Allegiance: Islamic State
- Service years: 2014 – 2015

Jake Bilardi (1 December 1996 – 11 March 2015), also known as Abu Abdullah al-Australi, dubbed by the media as Jihad Jake, was an eighteen-year-old Australian suicide bomber. Bilardi's background has been described as radically different from other Western recruits and symbolises youth issues more than ideological ones.

== Life, radicalisation and death ==
Born in Craigieburn, Victoria, Bilardi was a shy, lonely boy and student who was reportedly bullied by peers. He was the youngest of six, his parents were divorced, and he reportedly had many violent outbursts as a child.

Bilardi kept a blog describing his disdain for United States forces committing crimes against Muslims in the Middle East. He embraced Islam and became radical after his mother died of cancer. By 2014, he expressed sympathy for Osama bin Laden on Facebook. Concerned that the Australian government was monitoring him, Bilardi turned to building explosives in the event he would not be able to leave the country.

In August 2014, Mirsad Kandic, a recruiter for the Islamic State of Iraq and the Levant, instructed him how to travel from Australia to Turkey and thence to ISIL territory. Bilardi flew to Istanbul, arriving on 26 August. He had never traveled internationally before. Kandic arranged to have him picked up at the airport and smuggled into Syria. From there he went to Ramadi, Iraq.

In December 2014, he spoke to reporter Secunder Kermani and said he had told IS he wanted to be a suicide car bomber and was fast-tracked through his training. He told Kermani, "I came here chasing death, I might as well kill as many kuffar as I can" and, "You can stand on a street and scream about wanting change and wait maybe 100 years for things to happen or you can grab a gun and fight and change things quickly." He said his family "hated Islam" and that he believed all non-Muslims deeply hated Islam. According to a friend, Bilardi was concerned his family would "spend eternity in hell" for being non-believers.

A blog post attributed to Bilardi said, "I was intrigued, why would a group of people living in caves in Afghanistan want to kill innocent American civilians?" He was an aspiring journalist and a curious intelligent student, when he researched the issue more deeply he quickly found the version in the headlines is not the full story, but then became further radicalised eventually developing a hatred of the United States and their allies, including Australia. In addition to the blog he was very active on Twitter, promoting the Islamic State.

He died in a suicide attack in Ramadi on 11 March 2015. The Iraqi Army stated Bilardi's attack was unsuccessful, killing only himself. Other reports said 17 people were killed in the attack. ISIL used his death as propaganda, in order to recruit more people to become suicide bombers. Photos, supposedly of Bilardi inside a booby-trapped suicide van, was posted to ISIL-linked accounts on Twitter.

=== Reaction ===
Prime Minister Tony Abbott, commented on Bilardi's death as an "absolutely horrific situation", stating, "it's very, very important that we do everything we can to try to safeguard our young people against the lure of this shocking, alien and extreme ideology". Greg Barton, director of the Centre for Islam and the Modern World, considers Bilardi a self-radical motivated by underlying mental health issues instead of religious zealotry. His father said Bilardi "had a death wish" and ISIL "used him for his own cause", and said he wished he had gotten help for his son's psychological problems when he was a child.

In 2022, Bilardi's recruiter, Mirsad Kandic, an American resident, was convicted in a New York court of one count of conspiracy to provide material support to ISIL and five substantive counts of providing material support to ISIL in the forms of personnel, including himself, Bilardi and others, as well as services, weapons, property, and equipment, and false documentation and identification. He had controlled more than 100 Twitter accounts which he used to recruit people to ISIL. In July 2023, Kandic was sentenced to life in prison.

== See also ==
- Jihobbyist
- Terrorism in Australia
- Khaled Sharrouf
- Amira Karroum
