= Terrorism in Australia =

Terrorism in Australia deals with terrorist activities in Australia as well as steps taken by the Australian government to counter the threat of terrorism. In 2004 the Australian government has identified transnational terrorism as a threat to Australia and to Australian citizens overseas. Australia has experienced acts of modern terrorism since the 1960s, while the federal parliament, since the 1970s, has enacted legislation seeking to target terrorism.

Terrorism is defined as "an action or threat of action where the action causes certain defined forms of harm or interference and the action is done or the threat is made with the intention of advancing a political, religious and ideological or group cause".

The 2020s have seen a notable resurgence in terrorism in Australia. The current Australian National Terrorism Threat Level is set to probable. In 2024, the Australian government accused the government of Iran of state sponsored terrorism, for allegedly organising two arson attacks in Melbourne, against a kosher restaurant and a synagogue. On 14 December 2025, two gunmen motivated by the Islamic State committed a mass shooting at Bondi Beach, killing 15 people at a Hanukkah celebration. (Note: 10 men, 3 women, and a 10-year-old girl) This terrorist attack specifically motivated the National Cabinet to agree on further gun restrictions in Australia.

== Background ==
Multiple ideologies promote terrorism in Australia including religions extremists, far-right racially motivated groups, and Incels. The current main terrorism threats within Australia are far-right terrorism and the self-described Islamic State movement (also known as ISIL or ISIS). Various right wing extremist groups have posed tangible terrorism threats in Australia over several decades. The Australian Security Intelligence Organisation (ASIO) in the 1970s monitored Safari 8, the Legion of the Frontiersmen of the Commonwealth and the Australian Youth Coalition as terrorist threats, and from the 1980s through to the early 2000s sporadic terrorist activities were undertaken by National Action and the Australian Nationalist Movement. The deadliest terror attacks involving Australians have been overseas. The greatest number of Australian victims occurred in the 2002 Bali bombings, targeting Australian tourists in Indonesia. The deadliest terror attack ever committed by an Australian was far right, the Christchurch mosque massacre that killed 51 people in New Zealand in 2019. A number of incidents relating to the Islamic State group have involved Australians.

Researcher Kristy Campion argues that the far-right in Australia is itself diverse and that government must not rely on stereotypes. Campion argues for a three type model. 1) ethnocentric types who attack others based culture, race or religion; 2) anti-government types who attack government institutions and officials; 3) religious extremists.

== Notable terrorist attacks in Australia ==
Terrorist incidents in Australia
Year	Number of...		
Year	Incidents	Deaths	Injuries
2026	1	0	0
2025	1	16	40
2024	1	0	1
2022	1	6	1
2021	0	0	0
2020	1	2	0
2019	0	0	0
2018	2	1	3
2017	2	2	6
2016	9	0	1
2015	7	2	0
2014	8	4	7
2013	1	0	0
2012	0	0	0
2011	0	0	0
2010	1	0	0
2009	1	0	0
2008	3	0	0
2007	0	0	0
2006	2	0	0
2005	0	0	0
2004	0	0	0
2003	0	0	0
2002	0	0	0
2001	2	0	0
2000	1	0	0
1999	0	0	0
1998	6	0	2
1997	4	0	23
1996	5	2	1
1995	5	0	0
1994	9	3	8
1993	0	0	0
1992	4	1	4
1991	4	0	0
1990	0	0	0
1989	2	0	0
1988	3	0	0
1987	0	0	0
1986	2	2	22
1985	0	0	0
1984	0	0	0
1983	0	0	0
1982	2	0	3
1981	1	1	0
1980	6	2	3
1979	2	0	9
1978	2	2	9
1977	0	0	0
1976	0	0	0
1975	0	0	0
1974	1	0	0
1973	0	0	0
1972	2	1	0
1971	1	0	0
1970	1	0	0

Terrorists attacks have occurred in Australia over the country's history, including the following notable incidents.

=== Soviet Embassy bombing (1971) ===
The Embassy of the USSR was attacked by a crude bomb on 17 January 1971 in Canberra.

=== Sydney Yugoslav General Trade and Tourist Agency bombing (1972) ===
The Sydney Yugoslav General Trade and Tourist Agency bombing occurred in Haymarket, Sydney on 16 September 1972; the attack injured sixteen people. The perpetrators of the attack were believed to be Croatian separatists.

=== Sydney Hilton Hotel bombing (1978) ===
The Sydney Hilton Hotel bombing occurred on 13 February 1978; a bomb exploded outside the Hilton Hotel in George Street, Sydney, which was hosting the first Commonwealth Heads of Government Meeting. Two garbage collectors and a police officer were killed and nine others were injured.

=== Family Court of Australia attacks (1980–1985) ===
On 23 June 1980, David Opas, a judge of the Family Court, was shot dead outside his home in Woollahra. In March 1984, a bomb destroyed the Belrose home of fellow judge Richard Gee, who survived. In April, a bomb exploded in the Family Court building in Parramatta. In July, the wife of judge Ray Watson was killed when a bomb exploded on their doorstep in Greenwich. In July 1985 a bombing at a Jehovah's Witness hall in Casula killed the minister, Graham Wykes and injured 13 others.

On 29 July 2015, 68-year-old Leonard John Warwick was arrested at Campbelltown, New South Wales. He was charged with 32 offences, including four counts of murder, one of attempted murder, and 13 counts of burning or maiming with an explosive substance. On 3 September 2020, Warwick was sentenced to life in prison without the possibility of parole. He died in prison on 14 February 2025.

=== Iwasaki resort bombing (1980) ===
At 2am on 29 November 1980, the day of the Queensland State election, a nitropril and fuel oil bomb was detonated with gelignite at the Iwasaki resort construction site north of Yeppoon. The blast created a seven-metre-wide crater in a block of holiday units under construction. Premier Joh Bjelke-Petersen and MP Ben Humphreys labelled the incident a terrorist attack, and a caller to Rockhampton's The Morning Bulletin newspaper claimed responsibility on behalf of the "Queensland Republican Army". The media saw the motivation behind the attack as increasing resentment over Japanese land ownership in Queensland, while Petersen claimed that it was a racist attack. Two men, Eric John Geissman and Kerry Geissman, were committed to trial on 15 May 1981. Both were found not guilty after questions were raised regarding police misconduct in the investigation, a common problem in Queensland at the time.

=== Sydney Turkish Consul General assassination (1980) ===
On 17 December 1980, Sydney Turkish Consul General Şarık Arıyak and his security attaché Engin Sever were assassinated by two people on motorcycles wielding firearms in Sydney. The Justice Commandos of the Armenian Genocide claimed responsibility but the culprits were never identified and no charges were laid. The Consul General was gunned down despite having taken precautions in the form of not travelling in the official consulate Mercedes Benz vehicle and instead being chauffeured in the trailing security attaché's car. In December 2019, it was announced that New South Wales Joint Counter Terrorism Team had established Strike Force Esslemont to re-investigate the murders. The reward, for information that leads to an arrest and conviction, was increased from A$250,000 to A$1 million. This was the first ever million-dollar reward offered in Australia for an act of terrorism.

In August 2020 police Marine Area Command divers searched Greenwich Point in relation to the assassination.

=== Jack van Tongeren and the ANM (1980s, 2004) ===
Throughout the 1980s, the Western Australian neo-Nazi group "The Australian Nationalist Movement", led by Jack van Tongeren, engaged in a series of bombings of Asian restaurants and businesses, political violence, murder of a suspected informant and other acts to intimidate the Asian population. Van Tongeren was eventually imprisoned for a long period of time until his release in the early to mid-2000s. He resumed his activities until he was re-arrested in 2004 as part of Operation Atlantic, prompting a judge to order him to leave the state.

In February 2004 three Chinese restaurants in Perth were firebombed in the early hours of the morning. The police also identified a plot to harm Jim McGinty and his family, two police officers and an ethnic community leader, and raided Van Tongeren's home. After two separate man-hunts, the second after van Tongeren skipped bail, Van Tongeren was found and arrested in the Boddington area south-east of Perth. Van Tongeren was found guilty of planning to bomb Chinese restaurants in Perth and of organising a destructive hate campaign in 2007, but was given a 2-year suspended sentence on account of ill health. His right-hand man, John Van Blitterswyk, was given a 2-year, 4-month sentence.

=== 1981 alleged Croatian nationalist bombings in Sydney ===
The Croatian Six (Croatian: Hrvatska šestorka, consisting of Max Bebić, Vic Brajković, Tony Zvirotić, Joe Kokotović, his brother Ilija Kokotović and Mile Nekić) were six Croatian-Australian men sentenced to 15 years jail in 1981 for a conspiracy to bomb several targets in Sydney, including a Yugoslavian travel agent, the former Elizabethan Theatre in Newtown and a major water supply line in St Marys in western Sydney. The trial was one of the longest in Australian legal history, occupying 172 sitting days and with 111 witnesses giving testimonies. An appeal for these convictions and sentences failed, and the men were subsequently imprisoned for 10 years before being released in 1991.

Media investigations since the trial, such as for the ABC's Four Corners programme and The Sydney Morning Herald newspaper, suggested that much of the evidence on which the six were charged was fabricated and that the men were set up as part a sting operation by the Yugoslav foreign intelligence service, UDBA. Intelligence sources later confirmed that Dr Georgi Trajkovski, the Yugoslav Consul General in Melbourne, was a UDBA operative and a key player in the Croatian Six set up. Disgraced former detective Roger Rogerson, one of the arresting officers, later admitted that planting evidence during the 1970s and 80s was part of police culture. Australian investigative journalist Chris Masters revealed in 1991 that chief witness of the case, known by the name of Vice Vrkez, was actually UDBA's agent Vitomir Misimović, who infiltrated in Croatian community in Australia.

=== Israeli consulate and Hakoah Club bombing (1982) ===
The bombing of the Israeli Consulate and Hakoah Club in Sydney occurred on 23 December 1982. The two bombings occurred on the same day within five hours of each other. The initial case led to a single arrest though charges were later dropped. In 2011, the NSW police and Australian federal police reopened the case citing new leads.

=== Turkish consulate bombing (1986) ===
The Melbourne Turkish consulate bombing occurred on 23 November 1986; a car bomb exploded in a carpark beneath the Turkish Consulate in South Yarra, Melbourne, killing the bomber who failed to correctly set up the explosive device. Levon Demirian, a Sydney resident with links to the Armenian Revolutionary Federation, was charged over the attack and served 10 years.

=== Attempted assassination of Eddie Funde (1989) ===
In 1989, two Skinhead youths, inspired by the Australian-based neo-Nazi National Action group, fired shotguns at the home of African National Congress representative Eddie Funde in an assassination attempt. Head of National Action, James Saleam, was sentenced to three-and-a-half years in jail for ordering the assassination. The trial judge described the assassination as "an act of naked political terrorism".

=== Perth French Consulate bombing (1995) ===
In 1995, terrorists firebombed the French Consulate in Perth.

=== Abortion clinic attack (2001) ===
On 16 July 2001, Peter James Knight, described as an "obsessive anti-abortionist" who lived alone in a makeshift camp in rural New South Wales, attacked the East Melbourne Family Planning clinic, a privately run clinic providing abortions, carrying a rifle, and large quantities of kerosene and lighters. He shot and killed a security guard at the clinic before his capture and arrest. He was charged and convicted of murder, and was sentenced to life imprisonment with a non-parole period of 23 years. Australian terrorism academic Clive Williams listed the attack amongst incidents of politically motivated violence in Australia.

=== Holsworthy Barracks terror plot ===
Five arrested for an Islamist terrorist plot uncovered in August 2009 targeting Holsworthy Barracks—an Australian Army training area with automatic weapons. Given lengthy prison terms, the judge called them an ongoing threat to society as long as they were unrepentant of their jihadist attitudes. Connected with the Somali-based terrorist group al-Shabaab.

=== Endeavour Hills stabbings (2014) ===
On 24 September 2014, an 18-year-old man, Numan Haider, was shot and killed by police outside Endeavour Hills police station. Victoria Police Assistant Commissioner Luke Cornelius said Haider had been asked to come to the police station to discuss behaviour "which had been causing some concern". When the man arrived outside the station, he stabbed the two officers as they went to meet him. The two stabbed officers, one from Victoria Police and one from the Australian Federal Police, were working together as part of a joint operation on counter-terrorism between the AFP and Victoria Police. Haider was found to be carrying two knives and an Islamic State flag.

=== Lindt Cafe siege (2014) ===
On 15 December 2014, Man Haron Monis, took 17 people hostage inside a Lindt chocolate café in Martin Place, Sydney. He forced hostages to hold up a jihadist black flag against a window of the café. In the early hours of 16 December, police breached the café and fatally shot Monis following the escape of several hostages. Two hostages also died, while another four people, including a police officer, were injured in the incident.

Nick O'Brien, associate professor of counter terrorism at Charles Sturt University has said Islamic State's magazine claim that the Sydney siege gunman is a righteous jihadist should not be lightly dismissed. Dr David Martin Jones, Senior Lecturer at the School of Government, University of Tasmania has said not to underestimate the politically destabilising intent of Monis's lone-actor violence, as it is a considered tactic and a strategic goal of ISIL.

He had a long history of proven violence and violent threats within Australia. He had Shia family heritage but he had become a self-appointed Sunni cleric. He was a religious eccentric whose ideas had been rejected by the local Muslim community. He had been wanted on criminal changes in Iran, primarily related to fraud. Iran had notified Australia and Interpol several years earlier. They requested his extradition 14 years before the attack. He was not extradited because Australia did not have an extradition treaty with Iran. After the attack the Iranian ambassador said that the attack would not have happened if Monis had been extradited. The criminal charges were financial, but a foreign ministry told the ABC that Iran had also repeatedly discussed his psychological state with Australian officials.

==== Debate about terrorism categorisation ====
The designation of the 2014 Lindt Cafe siege, also known as the Sydney hostage crisis or the Martin Place siege, has been subject to debate among terrorism experts and news commentators. Initially, during the early stages of the incident, the Australian government and NSW authorities did not label the event as a terrorist attack; however, as the siege continued, NSW police authorised the engagement of the state's counterterrorism task force, treating the incident as an act of terrorism. Commentators have debated whether the perpetrator of the attack, Man Haron Monis, was in fact a terrorist and whether his actions can be classified as an act of terrorism. One terrorism expert described Monis's actions as those of a "lone-wolf terrorist ... driven by a desire for attention and to be in the spotlight." Another wrote in an opinion column that the attack "was very different from first-generation or second-generation terrorist attacks—but it was terrorism, and terrorism of a brutal and more unpredictable sort." Scott Stewart supervisor of the analysis of terrorism and security issues for Statfor said that this hostage-incident exhibits many of the elements associated with grassroots terrorism. By contrast, criminologist Mark Lauchs stated that the event "was not about religion and neither was it a terrorist attack." Media outlets have also provided conflicting designations for Monis; John Lehmann, editor of The Daily Telegraph, wrote how Monis filled the criteria of an Islamic State terrorist, while a columnist for The Guardian wrote how the designation of a terrorist is misplaced and would only serve the interests of ISIL. On 15 January 2015, Australia's Treasurer Joe Hockey declared the siege in Sydney's Martin Place as a terrorist incident for insurance purposes.

The difference between terrorism and terrorising acts was noted in one analysis as "enormously important"—in Monis's case, terrorism "was clearly an element, but he was coming to the end of his rope with a variety of legal processes; there was clearly some mental instability." One argument was that the gunman's lack of ties to any movement did not preclude his being a terrorist as it is "an inclusive club".

=== Parramatta shooting (2015) ===
On 2 October 2015, an Iranian-born Iraqi-Kurdish youth shot dead 58-year-old Curtis Cheng, an accountant who worked for the New South Wales Police Force, outside the Parramatta Police headquarters. The terrorist then shot at special constables guarding the building, and was shot dead by them. NSW Police Commissioner Andrew Scipione said "We believe that his actions were politically motivated and therefore linked to terrorism." Four other 'alleged Islamic State members' were arrested and charged in relation to the shooting.

=== Minto stabbing (2016) ===
On 10 September 2016, Islamist Ihsas Khan attacked a man in a park in Minto, New South Wales. The victim was chased and repeatedly stabbed or slashed with a knife. Khan was charged with attempted murder and with committing a terrorist act. Crown prosecutor Peter Neil said there was evidence to suggest Khan had been planning to attack a civilian at random on 11 September to coincide with the anniversary of the Al Qaeda attacks on the United States.

=== Queanbeyan stabbing (2017) ===
On 7 April 2017, a pair of 15- and 16-year-old boys entered a service station in the city of Queanbeyan, New South Wales and stabbed the attendant, 29-year-old Zeeshan Akbar of Pakistani descent, who died at the scene. Two other men were also attacked and injured nearby. Elsewhere a man was carjacked, struck with a hammer and stabbed. The 16-year-old's mother had told police that she believed her son had been radicalised in recent weeks and that he sympathised with Islamic State and had also posted concerning posts on Facebook. The police treated this as an act of terrorism. The two were arrested after a car chase. On 1 May 2020 at the NSW Supreme Court, both boys were sentenced. The 16-year-old received a jail term of 35 1/2 years. The 15-year-old received 18 years and 4 months.

=== Brighton siege (2017) ===
On 5 June 2017, 29-year-old Somali-born Islamist Yacqub Khayre shot dead receptionist Kai Hao in the foyer at a serviced apartment complex in the suburb of Brighton in Melbourne. He then took a female escort hostage in an apartment. He contacted both the police and the media. Police responded and Khayre died in a shoot-out with three police officers wounded. Khayre had referred to ISIS and al-Qaeda in a phone call to the media. In 2010 he had been acquitted of the earlier Holsworthy Barracks terror plot.

=== Mill Park stabbing (2018) ===
Momena Shoma, a Bangladeshi Islamist, stabbed a 56-year-old man in the neck while he was asleep at his Callistemon Rise home in Mill Park, Victoria. She was charged with engaging in a terrorist act and it was alleged she was inspired by terror group Islamic State. She pled guilty to "engaging in a terrorist act for the advancing of a political, religious or ideological cause" and in June 2019 was sentenced to 42 years jail, with a non-parole period of 31 years, 6 months.

In December 2021 Shoma was sentenced to serve an additional 6 years after attacking another inmate with garden shears and pleading guilty to two more terrorism offences for that attack.

=== Melbourne stabbing attack (2018) ===
On 9 November 2018, an attack took place in Melbourne, when Hassan Khalif Shire Ali set fire to a Holden Rodeo utility on Bourke Street in the city's Central Business District. He then stabbed three pedestrians, killing one and wounding the other two. During the attack, the Holden "exploded" from the fire. Hassan Khalif was shot in the chest by a Victoria Police officer and died in hospital.

Hassan Khalif's younger brother, Ali Khalif Shire Ali, was arrested in November 2017 for planning to commit a mass shooting at Melbourne's New Year's Eve celebration. In May 2020 Ali Khalif was sentenced to ten years' jail, with a seven-and-a-half-year non-parole period.

=== Brisbane stabbing attack (2020) ===
On 19 December 2020, a knifeman killed two elderly people after storming their home and then tried to attack police officers on a highway in Brisbane. The attacker, who was shot dead by police, had been identified as a 22-year-old-man who had a long history of mental health issues and escaped a GPS-tracking bracelet the previous night. He was previously arrested in early 2019 attempting to travel on a one-way ticket to Somalia and arrested "on suspicion of an attempted foreign incursion". Allegations against him were dropped by the AFP "due to a lack of evidence". The AFP spoke after the incident and said that there was no terror threat posed by the man.

=== Wakeley church stabbing (2024) ===
On 15 April 2024, a knife attack took place at Christ The Good Shepherd Church in Wakeley, a suburb of Sydney, Australia. During a live-streamed sermon, the 16-year-old male attacker walked up to the pulpit, first stabbing bishop Mari Emmanuel, an Iraqi-born Assyrian Australian, resulting in permanent vision loss in Emmanuel's right eye, before stabbing a priest and injuring another. The attacker said in Arabic, "If he didn't insult my prophet, I wouldn't have come here".

=== Adass Israel Synagogue arson attack (2024) ===
On 6 December 2024, the Adass Israel Synagogue in Ripponlea, Melbourne was deliberately set on fire. The attack was investigated as a terrorist incident.

=== Bondi Beach shooting (2025) ===
On 14 December 2025, a mass shooting occurred at Bondi Beach, Sydney, targeting Jewish people celebrating Hanukkah, resulting in multiple fatalities and even more injuries. NSW Police Force Commissioner Mal Lanyon, declared the mass shooting a terrorist incident. Both the Prime Minister of Australia, Anthony Albanese and NSW Premier Chris Minns have addressed the matter and described it as a disgraceful attack and sent hope for the best for all injured victims. Israeli President Isaac Herzog condemns 'cruel' shooting attack by 'vile terrorists' targeting Sydney Jewish community. Police said that improvised explosive devices were removed from a vehicle located near the position of the shooters.

=== Perth bombing attempt, Invasion Day rally (2026) ===
On 26 January 2026 – officially Australia Day, but also known by Indigenous Australians as Invasion Day (Note: Most sources used Invasion Day when describing the attack.) – a man threw a homemade fragment bomb into a gathering of 2,500 people at Forrest Place during an Invasion Day protest rally. The improvised explosive failed to explode, and there were no reported casualties.

WA Premier Roger Cook said that it had the potential to be a "mass casualty event". Malarndirri McCarthy said the incident had "narrowly avoided catastrophic disaster".

There was criticism of the disparity in concern between the danger to the Jewish and Indigenous communities; The Australian Human Rights Commission and Social Justice Commissioner Katie Kiss called for the attack to be given the same priority as the 2025 Bondi Beach shooting that had occurred six weeks earlier. It took WA police nine days to declare the event a terrorist attack.

== Notable terror plots ==
Australian police claim to have disrupted a significant number of terrorism plots since 2014.

=== Bob Hawke assassination plot ===
In 1975, the Palestinian Black September terrorist group and the Australian branch of the Popular Front for the Liberation of Palestine (PFLP) terrorist group plotted to assassinate future Australian Prime Minister Bob Hawke, then Australian Labor Party president, along with a number of notable Jewish journalists seen as being pro-Israel. A Black September member visited Australia under the guise of a journalist and was provided with materials from Australian PFLP members and returned to Israel; the Black September member who intended to carry out the attack was killed by Israeli forces before he could return to Australia.

=== 1981 alleged Croatian nationalist bombings in Sydney ===
The Croatian Six (Croatian: Hrvatska šestorka, consisting of Max Bebić, Vic Brajković, Tony Zvirotić, Joe Kokotović, his brother Ilija Kokotović and Mile Nekić) were six Croatian-Australian men sentenced to 15 years jail in 1981 for a conspiracy to bomb several targets in Sydney, including a Yugoslavian travel agent, the former Elizabethan Theatre in Newtown and a major water supply line in St Marys in western Sydney. The trial was one of the longest in Australian legal history, occupying 172 sitting days and with 111 witnesses giving testimonies. An appeal for these convictions and sentences failed, and the men were subsequently imprisoned for 10 years before being released in 1991.

Media investigations since the trial, such as for the ABC's Four Corners programme and The Sydney Morning Herald newspaper, suggested that much of the evidence on which the six were charged was fabricated and that the men were set up as part a sting operation by the Yugoslav foreign intelligence service, UDBA. Intelligence sources later confirmed that Dr Georgi Trajkovski, the Yugoslav Consul General in Melbourne, was a UDBA operative and a key player in the Croatian Six set up. Disgraced former detective Roger Rogerson, one of the arresting officers, later admitted that planting evidence during the 1970s and 80s was part of police culture. Australian investigative journalist Chris Masters revealed in 1991 that chief witness of the case, known by the name of Vice Vrkez, was actually UDBA's agent Vitomir Misimović, who infiltrated in Croatian community in Australia.

=== Faheem Khalid Lodhi ===
Faheem Khalid Lodhi is an Australian architect accused of an October 2003 plot to bomb the national electricity grid or Sydney defence sites in the cause of violent jihad. He was convicted by a New South Wales Supreme Court jury in June 2006 on terrorism-related offences, namely:

- Preparation for terrorist attack, by seeking information for the purpose of constructing explosive devices
- Seeking information and collecting maps of the Sydney electricity supply system and possessing 38 aerial photos of military installations in preparation for terrorist attacks
- Possessing terrorist manuals detailing how to manufacture poisons, detonators, explosives and incendiary devices

In his judgement, Justice Anthony Whealy illustrated that Lodhi's behaviour breached the rules under the Anti Terrorism Act 2004 (Cth), Crimes Act 1914 (Cth), the Criminal Code and the Crimes (Internationally Protected Persons) Act 1976 (Cth)

His intended targets were the national electricity supply system, the Victoria Barracks, HMAS Penguin naval base, and Holsworthy Barracks. Justice Anthony Whealy commented at sentencing that Lodhi had "the intent of advancing a political, religious or ideological cause, namely violent jihad" to "instill terror into members of the public so that they could never again feel free from the threat of bombing in Australia."

Accordingly, Whealy said the sentence to be imposed "must be a substantial one to reflect the important principles of deterrence and denunciation. In relation to count 2 the appropriate sentence, in my view, is one of imprisonment for a term of 20 years. The sentence is to commence on 22 April 2004 and to expire on 21 April 2024."

=== Neil Prakash ===
Neil Prakash is a former Buddhist from Melbourne who became a jihadist and changed his name to Abu Khaled al-Cambodi.

He was linked to a number of domestic terror threats, including an alleged Anzac Day terror plot in Melbourne and the shooting death of NSW police worker Curtis Cheng in western Sydney in 2015. Later, he fled to Syria and became a senior recruiter for the Islamic State in Iraq and Syria, appearing in propaganda videos and magazines with the intention of recruiting people to commit acts of terrorism.

Prakash was reportedly killed by a targeted US air strike in northern Iraq in May 2016. Australian Prime Minister Malcolm Turnbull commented: "Neil Prakash's death is a very, very positive development in the war against Daesh and the war against terror". The Herald Sun later reported that Australian security officials were "almost certain" that Prakash had not been killed in the airstrike and had continued to act as a recruiter for the group. In November 2016, Australian counter-terrorism officials confirmed that Prakash was still alive, and had been arrested after attempting to enter Turkey from Syria. On 16 March 2019, he was convicted in Turkey of membership in a terrorist organisation and sentenced to seven-and-a-half years in prison.

In early December 2022 Prakash was extradited back to Australia and charged in Melbourne Magistrates' Court with terrorism-related offences. He was due to reappear in court in late February 2023.

=== Sydney Five ===
Khaled Cheikho, Moustafa Cheikho, Mohamed Ali Elomar, Abdul Rakib Hasan and Mohammed Omar Jamal were found guilty of conspiring to commit a terrorist act or acts. They were jailed on 15 February 2010 for terms ranging from 23 to 28 years.

=== Benbrika Group in Melbourne ===
In September 2008, of an original nine defendants, five men including the Muslim cleric, Abdul Nacer Benbrika were convicted of planning a terrorist attack. During the trial, the jury heard evidence of plans to bomb the 2005 AFL Grand Final, 2006 Australian Grand Prix and the Crown Casino, as well as a plot to assassinate then Prime Minister John Howard.

Despite Benbrika having completed his sentence on 5 November 2020, the Department of Home Affairs applied to the Victorian Supreme Court to keep him detained, and he was, under an interim order from the court.

On 19 December 2023 Justice Elizabeth Hollingworth, in the Victorian Supreme Court, granted Benbrika release. He is to be kept on an extended supervision order for a year.

=== Holsworthy Barracks terror plot ===
On 4 August 2009, four men in Melbourne were charged over the Holsworthy Barracks terror plot, an alleged plan to storm the Holsworthy Barracks in Sydney with automatic weapons; and shoot army personnel or others until they were killed or captured. The men are allegedly connected with the Somali-based terrorist group al-Shabaab. Prime Minister Kevin Rudd subsequently announced a federal government review of security at all military bases.

In December 2011 Justice Betty King sentenced three of the men to 18 years in prison with minimum terms of thirteen-and-half years. She said that they were all "unrepentant radical Muslims and would remain a threat to the public while they held extremist views".

=== 2015 Anzac Day terror plot ===
Sevdet Besim was arrested on 18 April 2015. Aged 18 and born to parents of Albanian origin, he planned to drive a car into and kill, then behead, a law enforcement officer on Anzac Day in Melbourne. He was subsequently sentenced to 15 years' imprisonment on 5 September 2016.

=== 2017 airline bombing plot ===
In July 2017, Australian police thwarted a plot to bomb an airliner. In Sydney, four men were arrested by the Australian Federal Police and their properties were searched. On 17 December 2019 Khaled Khayat was sentenced to 40 years in prison (with a non-parole period of 30 years). Mahmoud Khayat was sentenced to 36 years (with a non-parole period of 27 years).

Amer Khayat was the third brother who was to, unknowingly, carry the bomb onto the plane. Amer was arrested overseas and spent two-and-a-half years in a Beirut prison. In September 2019 he was cleared of any involvement by a military tribunal.

=== Tamim Khaja ===
On 31 October 2017, Tamim Khaja plead guilty to planning a terrorist attack on targets in Sydney that included the Timor Army Barracks and Sydney West Trial Courts. He was arrested in May 2016 as he was attempting to obtain firearms, explosives and an Islamic State flag.

=== 2014 plot ===
On 3 November 2017 Sulayman Khalid, also known as "Abu Bakr", was sentenced to up to 22 years and 6 months' jail in the NSW Supreme Court by Justice Geoffrey Bellew. He was the leader among five of six conspirators who were sentenced in connection to a plot between 7 November and 18 December 2014 that targeted government sites, including the Lithgow Correctional Centre and an Australian Federal Police building in Sydney. Jibryl Almaouie, Mohamed Almaouie, Farhad Said and an unnamed teenager were all sentenced to jail terms for their part. Ibrahim Ghazzawy, the sixth conspirator was earlier in 2017 sentenced to a minimum of 6 years and 4 months. Khalid appeared on the SBS program Insight in 2014, where he said that Islamic State only wanted to bring "justice, peace and humanitarian aid to the people". He later stormed off the set. Khalid was arrested on 23 December 2014 by Joint Counter Terrorism Team members as part of Operation Appleby.

=== Joshua Ryne Goldberg ===
In 2015, Jewish American internet troll Joshua Goldberg was arrested for planning a bombing in Kansas City while posing as an Australian ISIS supporter. A 17-year-old Melbourne teenager who had been in contact with Goldberg pleaded guilty to preparing a terror attack, after bombs were found in his home. Goldberg's ISIS persona also attempted to incite mass shootings in Australia.

=== Victorian Trades Hall bombing plot ===
In 2016, Phillip Galea, a Victorian man associated with the far-right group Reclaim Australia, was arrested for planning bombings of various "leftist" organisations in Melbourne, including Trades Hall in Carlton, the Melbourne Anarchist Club in Northcote and the Resistance Centre in the Melbourne CBD. He was arrested in August 2016, after police raids of his home in November 2015 found cattle prods, mercury, information relating to home-made bombs and a document drafted by Galea called the "Terrorist's Cookbook", intended to be a how-to-guide for Right-wing terrorists.

Galea was convicted of plotting terrorist attacks and creating a document likely to facilitate a terrorist act in December 2019 and given a 12-year jail sentence. The Court was told that his aim were to eliminate the leaders of the left in Melbourne, blaming them for the "Islamisation" of Australia.

=== Federation Square attack plot ===
On 27 November 2017 an Australian man of Somali parentage was arrested for plotting a mass shooting. Twenty-year-old Ali Khalif Shire Ali from Werribee, Victoria was charged the next day in Melbourne Magistrates' Court with: preparing to commit a terrorist attack, and gathering documents to facilitate a terrorist act. Police believed that Ali planned to "shoot and kill as many people as he could" in Federation Square, Melbourne on New Year's Eve.

In May 2019 Ali pled guilty to preparing a terrorist attack. On 21 May 2020 he was sentenced to ten years' jail, with a seven-and-a-half-year non-parole period. In December 2020 his sentence was increased to sixteen years, with a non-parole period of twelve years. Ali's brother was 30-year-old Hassan Khalif Shire Ali, who committed a stabbing attack in Melbourne in November 2018. Hassan killed one person, and was then shot and killed by police.

=== Peter Dutton assassination plot ===
In August 2024 a 16-year-old was arrested by Australian Federal and Queensland Police for plotting the assassination of leader of the opposition Peter Dutton with a drone and homemade explosives at his private residence, north of Brisbane. The attack was allegedly planned over two months, from 21 May to 15 July 2024, in which the 16-year-old researched different bomb-making instructions, purchased explosives ingredients, tested thermal chemical reactions, and tested multiple homemade explosives.

== Counterterrorism efforts ==
=== Australians joining external conflicts ===
The Islamic State of Iraq and the Levant (ISIL), proscribed by the government as a terrorist organisation, has targeted Australian Muslims for recruitment. Making use of social media, recruiters target those vulnerable to radicalisation, and encourage local jihad activities. Some of those targeted have been minors, including a 17-year-old who was arrested in Melbourne in May 2015 for plotting to detonate home-made bombs, and sentenced to 7 years' jail. In June 2014, the government claimed that roughly 150 Australians had been recruited to fight in the conflicts in Syria and Iraq. A list released in April 2015 showed that most were young males who have come from a range of occupations, including students. It was also reported at the time that 20 Australians had been killed fighting overseas for terror groups, with 249 suspected jihadists prevented from leaving Australia. The Australian Border Force Counter-Terrorism Unit, tasked with stopping jihadists from leaving the country, had cancelled more than 100 passports by the end of March 2015. Several jihadists have expressed the desire to return to Australia, but Prime Minister Tony Abbott has said that any who do would be prosecuted on their arrival.

In May 2016, in what became known as the 'Tinnie terror plot', five men were arrested as they towed a boat in the Northern Territory. A sixth was arrested in Melbourne. The group was charged with "making preparations for incursions into foreign countries to engage in hostile activities." They had intended to go by sea to help Islamic insurgents in the Philippines overthrow their government. All six men were jailed. As of April 2020 two of them had been released. The leader, Musa Cerantonio was sentenced to seven years.

On 1 September 2016 Hamdi Alquidsi was sentenced to 8 years' jail (6 years minimum) by Justice Christine Adamson. In July he was found guilty of seven counts of "supporting engagement in armed hostilities" in Syria. Two men who he helped travel to Syria were killed there, two others have returned to Australia. The fate of another two is unknown, while the last never left. Alqudsi will be eligible for release in July 2022.

=== September 2014 AFP raids (Operation Appleby) ===
==== Raids in Sydney and Brisbane (18 September 2014) ====
In the early hours of 18 September 2014, large teams of Australian Federal Police (AFP) and other security agencies conducted search operations in both Sydney and Brisbane. Australian Prime Minister Tony Abbott has alluded to an alleged plot aimed at conducting a random act of terrorism as the reason for the police action. This action is described as the largest in Australian history to date. One man arrested, from Guildford, allegedly conspired to commit a "horrifying" terrorist act with a man believed to be the most senior Australian Islamic State leader.

==== Melbourne raids (30 September 2014) ====
On 30 September 2014 there were more raids in Melbourne. The AFP executed seven search warrants in Broadmeadows, Flemington, Kealba, Meadow Heights and Seabrook. Over 100 officers from Federal and State police forces took part. A man from Seabrook will be charged with "intentionally making funds available to a terrorist organisation knowing that organisation was a terrorist organisation", AFP Assistant Commissioner Gaughan said. The man is alleged to have provided money to a United States citizen who was fighting in Syria.

=== February 2015 Sydney raid ===
On 10 February 2015 two men were arrested in Fairfield, New South Wales, and charged with "Acts done in preparation, for, or planning terrorists acts". On the morning of 10 February police were informed the two were planning a terrorist attack. They were quickly placed under surveillance and tracked. When they purchased a hunting knife from a store about 3:00 pm, NSW Joint Counter Terrorism Team (JCTT) forces decided to intervene and soon after 4:00 pm the men were arrested.

The men were a 24-year-old student from Iraq, and a 25-year-old nurse who moved from Kuwait in 2012. The two were unknown to police until the tip-off. The men's residence, a vehicle and places of work were searched. They were found with a machete, a hunting knife, a homemade Islamic State flag and "a video which depicted a man talking about carrying out an attack", according to NSW Police Deputy Commissioner (Specialist Operations) Catherine Burn. One of the men arrested appeared in the video.

Burn also said: "We will allege that both of these men were preparing to do this act yesterday" and "We believe that the men were potentially going to harm somebody, maybe even kill somebody ...".

The JCTT investigation has been given the code name Operation Castrum.

=== May 2015 Melbourne ===
On 8 May 2015 a 17-year-old was arrested in Greenvale, Melbourne for plotting to detonate home-made bombs. He was charged with:

engaging in an act in preparation for, or planning, a terrorist act contrary to section 101.6 of the Criminal Code(Cth) and possess things connected with a terrorist act, contrary to section 101.4 of the Criminal Code (Cth)

Three alleged improvised explosive devices were found and rendered safe in a park by controlled detonation. The teenager appeared in court on 11 May and was remanded to reappear on 26 May. 'Operation Amberd' was formed, and investigations made for 9 days, after a call to a security hotline. AFP and Victorian police of the Melbourne Joint Counter Terrorism Team (JCTT) carried out the raid. AFP Deputy Commissioner Mike Phelan said: "We can absolutely guarantee we have stopped something."

=== December 2016 Christmas terror plot ===
On 23 December 2016 seven people were arrested in Melbourne for plotting an attack on Christmas Day. Properties were raided at Campbellfield, Dallas, Victoria, Flemington, Gladstone Park and Meadow Heights. The would-be terrorists planned to attack Federation Square, Flinders Street railway station and St. Paul's Cathedral, three landmarks clustered in the centre of Melbourne. An explosive device and other weapons were to be used. Abdullah Chaarani, Ahmed Mohamed and Hamza Abbas were found guilty 2 November 2018 in the Supreme Court of Victoria of plotting an attack in the name of the Islamic State. The trio smiled, laughed and made thumbs up as the verdict was announced. The police brought the weapons the trio had purchased to kill people who did not adhere to their radical version of Sunni Islam.

=== February 2017 Young ===
In late February 2017 a man was arrested at Young, New South Wales after an 18-month investigation. The man is a 42-year-old electrician and Australian citizen. He is alleged "... to have been researching how to develop laser missile detection equipment for IS and helping the extremists develop their own destructive missile arsenal". He appeared the same day at Young Local Court charged with two foreign incursion offences, and a count of "failing to comply with an order to assist access to data".

=== New South Wales in 2019 ===
==== March 2019 in Coffs Harbour and Maclean ====
On 15 March 2019 an Australian terrorist killed 51 people in Christchurch New Zealand. On 18 March 2019, the Australian Federal Police conducted raids on the homes of the terrorist's sister and mother near Coffs Harbour and Maclean in New South Wales. Police said the raids were carried out to assist New Zealand Police with their investigations into the shootings, adding that the terrorist's sister and mother were assisting the investigation. The terrorist streamed video of the attacks on social media. The attack inspired numerous copycat attacks and was used in ISIS propaganda calling for retaliation. On 19 March 2019, an Australian man who had posted on social media praising the shootings was indicted on one count of aggravated possession of a firearm without a licence and four counts of using or possessing a prohibited weapon. He was released on bail on the condition that he stay offline. The man pleaded guilty in Magistrates Court to four counts of possessing a prohibited weapon.

==== July 2019 in Western Sydney ====
On 2 July 2019 the JCTT carried out raids in Western Sydney, including in Canada Bay, Chester Hill, Greenacre, Green Valley, Ingleburn and Toongabbie. Three men aged, 20, 23, and 30-year were arrested.

One of them, Radwan Dakkak, now 25, was jailed for 18 months in December 2020 for "associating with a member of a terrorist organisation", that person being another of those arrested, Isaac El Matari, a member of Islamic State (IS). Dakkak was the first Australian to be prosecuted for this offence. Dakkak was released in January 2021 as he had already served most of his time in custody, waiting for court proceedings to conclude. Weeks later he was rearrested for allegedly breaching a control order.

In October 2021 IS member Isaac El Matari now aged 22, was jailed for preparing a terrorist attack. He received a maximum term of 7 years and 4 months, with a five-and-a-half-year non-parole period. El Matari previously served 9 months in jail in Lebanon for attempting to join IS, after which he returned to Australia in June 2018. He was under surveillance into 2019 and spoke with associates about establishing an IS insurgency in Australia.

== Threats ==
=== Far-right terrorism ===
In the wake of the 2019 Christchurch mosque terrorist attacks at Al Noor Mosque and Linwood Islamic Centre in Christchurch, New Zealand, in which 51 people were murdered, by Australian Brenton Harrison Tarrant from Grafton, a self-described "Ethno-nationalist", "Eco-fascist", "Kebab removalist" "racist", New South Wales Police Commissioner Michael Fuller identified the likelihood of right wing lone wolf terrorist attacks in Australia as "an emerging risk" and indicated he will consider boosting resources into the anti-terrorism squad focused on right-wing extremists. Recent examples of such right wing extremist 'lone wolves' include white supremacist Michael Holt, jailed for weapons and child pornography offences after threatening to carry out a mass shooting at a shopping centre on the NSW Central Coast, and Phillip Galea, convicted of terrorism charges relating to planned bombings of left wing organisations in Melbourne.

In 2015 the New South Wales Police Force's Counter Terrorism and Special Tactics Command assessed that members of the anti-government sovereign citizen movement posed a potential terrorist threat. At the time there were reported to be 300 members of this movement in the state. While there had been no incidents of violence associated with sovereign citizens in Australia at that time, the NSW Police were concerned that members of the movement were becoming radicalised and could commit attacks such as those made by sovereign citizens in the United States.

=== Islamic State ===
A number of incidents relating to the Islamic State of Iraq and the Levant (ISIL) terrorist group have involved Australians and garnered the attention of the Australian public. ISIL is a militant Sunni group which has been proscribed by Australian authorities as a terrorist organisation.

In 2014, two Australian Islamic extremists made a propaganda video encouraging Australians to join the ISIL, According to the Australian government, up to 150 Australians "have been or are currently overseas fighting with extremists in Iraq and Syria". Some of their activities are thought to be war crimes. Australian man, Khaled Sharrouf, posted a picture of himself, and another of his son, holding a decapitated soldier's head.

ISIL recruited Australian nationals for terror attacks in the Middle East including suicide bombings as late as March 2015. Eighteen-year-old Jake Bilardi, known as Jihadi Jake, converted to Sunni Islam. He died on 11 March 2015 when he carried out a suicide bombing against the Iraqi Army in Ramadi, Iraq.

In 2015 it was reported that more than 20 Australians who have fought with ISIL have returned and are being monitored by security agencies. Then Foreign Minister Julie Bishop has said, "there is a risk they will come back as battle-hardened experienced terrorists ... and try to carry out terrorist attacks".

The Attorney-General Senator George Brandis has expressed concern that those fighting jihad, then returning from the Middle East, represent, "the most significant risk to Australia's security that we have faced in many years." The Australian Security Intelligence Organisation (ASIO) is concerned that Australians fighting jihad may return home to plan terror attacks. In October 2014, ISIL published an online video in which a teenage Australian Jihadi, Abdullah Elmir, threatened the United States and Australia, naming U.S. President Barack Obama and Australian Prime Minister Tony Abbott as targets.

On 18 April 2015, at least 200 police officers conducted a series of raids in Melbourne, frustrating a terror plot planned for ANZAC Day. During the raids Sevdet Besim was arrested, and in June 2016 pleaded guilty to planning a terrorism attack, in which he planned to behead a police officer. In October 2015, a British minor from Blackburn was found guilty and sentenced to life in prison for being the mastermind of the plot. In January 2021, the Parole Board said that "considerable progress that had been made" in his rehabilitation, and that he was suitable for release.

According to witnesses, some years later, some the officers committed some abuses during the raid; they had thrown a suspect into a fridge, causing a deep cut, made repeated racial slurs to an Aboriginal man and assaulted him. The Australian federal police spent years denying these accusations.

On 6 September 2016 ISIL published a new online magazine in which they urged "lone wolves" to carry out attacks:

Kill them on the streets of Brunswick, Broadmeadows, Bankstown, and Bondi. Kill them at the MCG, the SCG, the Opera House, and even in their backyards,

The same statement was published in other languages naming locations in France, Germany and Indonesia.

Two days later on 8 September a man was detained at the Sydney Opera House after acting suspiciously. He was later charged with "threatening to destroy or damage property."

== Anti-terrorism legislation ==
=== 20th century legislation ===
Prior to the 1960s, there had not been any act in Australia that could accurately be deemed "terrorism" in the modern political and strategic sense of the word. Politically motivated violent incidents were rare, usually isolated, and for the most part driven by issues arising from political legislation, greed, or individuals being singled out, such as the attempted assassination of Australian Labor Party Leader Arthur Calwell in 1965 over his Vietnam War stance. Likewise the 1968 attack on the US Consulate in Melbourne was also regarded to be an isolated incident protesting the US involvement in Vietnam. The two exceptions to this state of affairs would be the assassination attempt on the Duke of Edinburgh in 1868 by an Irish Nationalist named Henry O'Farrell, who was later executed for his crime, and an attack in Broken Hill in 1915 by Afghan supporters of the Sultan of Turkey.

Although it had known sporadic acts through its history, and examples of modern terrorism for almost a decade, Australia did not introduce terrorism specific laws into Parliament until the late 1970s. In 1977, after a three-year inquiry into Australia's intelligence services, Justice Robert Hope delivered his Royal Commission on Intelligence and Security (RCIS). The RCIS recommended amongst other things that the Australian Security Intelligence Organisation (ASIO) areas of investigation be widened to include terrorism. A further Protective Security Review by Justice Hope in 1978 following the Sydney Hilton bombing designated ASIO as the government agency responsible for producing national threat assessments in the field of terrorism and politically motivated violence.

=== 21st century legislation ===
Successive governments have reviewed and altered the shape of both legislation and the agencies that enforce it to cope with the changing face, threat and scope of terrorism. It was not until after the attacks of 11 September 2001, however, that Australian policy began to change to reflect a growing threat against Australia and Australians specifically. Until then the view held from the 1960s had been that terrorist actions in Australia were considered as a problem imported from conflicts overseas and concerned with foreign targets on Australian soil.

==== Listed Terrorist organisations ====
The Security Legislation Amendment (Terrorism) Act 2002 was passed by the Australian Parliament and inserted a range of terrorist organisation offences into the Criminal Code Act 1995 (Cth). For example, the Act made it an offence to provide support to a terrorist organisation.

Since November 2016, there have been 20 organisations designated as terrorist organisations. Organisations can be so designated by a court or a government department. All but one of those organisations are Islamist. Identification of an organisation as a terrorist organisation may result from a prosecution for a terrorist offence, or from a listing determined by the Attorney-General of Australia. The Australian list does not correspond to similar lists of other countries or international organisations.

==== 2004 and 2005 ====
In 2004, the Howard government introduced into Parliament three anti-terrorism bills, collectively called the Australian anti-terrorism legislation, 2004, and in 2005 the Australian Anti-Terrorism Act 2005 was passed.

Before 2006, the last legislation to be brought into effect was the Anti-Terrorism Act (No. 2) 2005.

The Anti-Money Laundering and Counter-Terrorism Financing Act 2006 (Cth) came into law on 12 December 2006, and extends the regulatory regime imposed by the Financial Transaction Reports Act 1988.

==== 2014–2015 ====
New anti-terror laws were introduced in three stages in 2014:

- In July 2014, the National Security Legislation Amendment Bill (No. 1) 2014 was passed by Parliament on 25 September 2014.
- In September 2014 the Counter-Terrorism Legislation Amendment (Foreign Fighters) Bill was introduced by Attorney-General George Brandis, passed on 29 October 2014, and assented to on 3 November 2014. As part of this Bill the Crimes (Foreign Incursions and Recruitment) Act 1978 was repealed.
- In October 2014 the Telecommunications (Interception and Access) Amendment (Data Retention) Bill 2014 was introduced to amend the Telecommunications (Interception and Access) Act 1979, and then referred to the Parliamentary Joint Committee on Intelligence and Security. The Senate passed the bill as the Telecommunications (Interception and Access) Amendment (Data Retention) Act 2015 on 26 March 2015. Assent was received on 13 April 2015.

==== Control orders ====
In the wake of 2 October 2015 shooting death of a civilian police employee, the New South Wales government requested legal changes to allow control orders on people aged 14 and over. Attorney-General George Brandis agreed to the changes. The NSW Council for Civil Liberties criticised the proposal. The councils president Stephen Blanks said: "The proposed laws are undoubtedly going to be in breach of human rights standards,"

==== Shooting policy ====
In November 2015 it was stated that New South Wales police were being retrained to "...shoot terrorists on sight rather than try to contain them and negotiate...".

==== Stripping citizenship from Australians accused of terrorism ====
In August 2018 five Australians who had travelled to fight with the Islamic State were stripped of Australian citizenship and barred from reentering Australia. This was possible because they had another citizenship, because international law does not permit the measure being used on individuals with only one citizenship. The five brought the total to six for Australians stripped of citizenship for acts "contrary to their allegiance to Australia".

== Social impact ==
=== Croatian Australians ===
In the late 20th century Croatian Australians were stereotyped as terrorists, and fascist extremists. This based on events that mostly occurred overseas, and continuing animosity from Croatians siding with Germany in WWII. Many of them had engaged in non-violent activism for Croatian independence. There were some incidents credibly linked to the movement, such as the Sydney Yugoslav General Trade and Tourist Agency bombing. However a later alleged plot, by the Croatian Six was based on evidence fabricated by NSW police and a Serbian man, pretending to be Croatian who was working for Yugoslav intelligence.

=== Muslim community ===
Researchers have observed that Muslims in Australia have become a "stigmatised minority", subject to increased surveillance by state authorities as well as public discourse that constructs Muslims as a potential terrorist threat. Researchers term this the "suspect community" thesis. Researchers study how Muslims perceive themselves as a suspect community and how this influences their support for counter-terrorism efforts.

=== Jewish community ===
Terrorism in Australia has impacted the Australian Jewish community. After the 2001 terrorist attacks in the United States, the Australian Jewish community became a prime target of Al-Qaeda terror cells. Notable terrorist incidents impacting the Jewish community in Australia include the 1982 bombing of a Jewish centre in Sydney, the 2024 firebombing of a Melbourne synagogue, and the Bondi Beach shooting.

== Australians overseas ==
=== Terrorist attacks targeting Australians overseas ===
- 2002 Bali bombings – Terrorist attacks in Indonesia

=== Terrorist attacks committed by Australians overseas ===
- 1969 Al-Aqsa mosque fire in East Jerusalem, Israel (Denis Michael Rohan)
- 15 March 2019, Christchurch mosque shootings – Brenton Tarrant, an Australian, killed 51 people in Christchurch, New Zealand.

=== Australians accused of terrorism overseas ===
The following Australians were not convicted of any specific terrorist attacks:

- David Hicks – Australian who trained with Al-Qaeda and was later detained at Guantanamo Bay

== Terrorist groups in Australia ==
A number of terror organisations and terror cells have operated in Australia, with their activities including fund-raising and providing material support for terror activities overseas, as well as plotting and executing domestic terrorism. The following table includes a selection of these groups.

Name of group	Type	Leadership	Years active	Description	Notable incidents
"Ahmed Y" group	Islamist	"Ahmed Y"	2000s	Ahmed Y, an Algerian man who arrived in Australia in the late 1980s, established a small militant group in Australia in 2001 and supported the idea of establishing an Islamic State in Australia and the use of violence against Australians.	
Al-Shabaab	Islamist	Local groups with ties to the Somali-based Al-Shabaab	2007–2009	Individuals based in Sydney and Melbourne aligned with Al-Shabaab were investigated by police. Five Melbourne men were charged with plotting an attack on the Holsworthy Barracks. Following this incident, the group was listed as an outlawed terrorist organisation.	Holsworthy Barracks terror plot
Australian Nationalist Movement	Far-right	Jack van Tongeren	1980s and 2000s	The Australian Nationalist Movement was based in Perth and influenced from the neo-Nazi National Action, and developed a specific racist ideology targeted against Asian migrants.	The group orchestrated violent campaigns against Asian-owned businesses in Perth, primarily in the 1980s, culminating in a bombing attack in 2004.
Benbrika Jama'ah (Benbrika group)	Islamist	Abdul Nacer Benbrika, an Algerian cleric	2000s–2005	A Melbourne group led by Abdul Benbrika was active until Australian police arrested its members in 2005.	
Cheikho group	Islamist	Khaled Cheikho	2000s–2005	A group led by Khaled Cheikho was active in Sydney until the Australian police arrested its members in 2005 under Operation Pendennis.	
Croatian Revolutionary Brotherhood	Far-right		1963–1972	The Croatian Revolutionary Brotherhood was a fascist/right-wing inspired terrorist group made up of Croatian emigre. The group succeeded the Ustashe who were responsible for taking part in the Serbian Genocide and Holocaust during World War II. From 1963 to 1972, the CRB set up training camps in both NSW and Victoria and were responsible for numerous attacks against targets affiliated with the then-Socialist Federal Republic of Yugoslavia.	
Islamic State				2025 Bondi Beach shooting	
Jabhat al-Nusra	Islamist		2010s	ABC News reported that the Al Qaeda group Jabhat al-Nusra was likely to be active in Sydney owing to the quick rise in ranks of Abu Sulayman al-Muhajir, a Sydney man who joined the group in Syria. Abu Sulayman was designated as a "Specially Designated Global Terrorist" by the United States in 2016.	
Lashkar-e-Taiba	Islamist		2000s	Lashkar-e-Taiba, a proscribed terrorist organisation based out of Pakistan, set up a terror cell in Australia. French convert to Islam, Willie Brigitte, accused of planning an attack in Australia, was trained by Lashkar-e-taiba.	
Mantiqi 4 (Jemaah Islamiah)	Islamist	Abdul Rahim Ayub, with support from Jemaah Islamiah in Indonesia	1990s–2000s	A terror cell known as Mantiqi 4 existed in Australia for several years. The group was sponsored by Jemaah Islamiah (JI), a terrorist group known for their attacks in Indonesia, and was established by Abdul Rahim Ayub, a member of Jemaah Islamiah. Ayub resided in Perth during the late 1990s all while being an active JI member, travelling and attending the group's leadership conferences in Indonesia. In contrast to the Jemaah Islamiah's other cells in Southeast Asia, the Mantiqi 4 cell was less of a focus for the organisation. The activities of the Australian branch of JI included fundraising among the local Indonesian community in Australia. Jemaah Islamiah leadership also expressed intent on identifying targets in Australia to be attacked by Al Qaeda.	The group plotted to bomb the Israeli Embassy in Canberra, resulting in the arrest of the group's recruit Jack Roche.
National Action (Australia)	Far-right	Jim Saleam and David Greason	1982–1989	National Action was an Australian white supremacist militant group founded by Jim Saleam and former neo-Nazi David Greason in 1982. The group disbanded following the murder of a member in the group's headquarters at Tempe.	The group was responsible for an attempted assassination of African National Congress representative Eddie Funde in 1989.
Syrian syndicate	Islamist		2010s	A group referred to as the "Syrian syndicate" was investigated for recruiting Australian Muslims to fight in the Syrian Civil War. Australian Counterterrorism Police also investigated Wassim Fayad in connection to an attempt to ram an ATM during the 2011 Auburn riots. It is suspected that the funds were to be used in connection to local efforts of involvement in the Syrian conflict.	
True Blue Crew	Far-right (Anti-Islam)				
Ustaše in Australia	Far-right Croatian nationalism				Foreign fighters in the Croatian War of Independence

== See also ==
- 2012 Burgas bus bombing, an Australian was convicted
- ANZUS § Afghanistan and Iraq, Australian involvement in the "war on terror"
- Martin Bryant, worst mass shooter in Australia
- Crime in Australia
- Hindu terrorism
- List of disasters in Australia by death toll
- List of assassinations in Lebanon
- List of major terrorist incidents
- Right-wing terrorism
- Terrorism in Indonesia, Australia's neighbour and ally
