= Tasnime Akunjee =

British lawyer and political commentator

- Born: Mohammed Tasnime Akunjee; December 1977 (age 48); London, England
- Occupations: Criminal law; human rights lawyer; political commentator
- Known for: Tommy Robinson defamation case, Almondbury Community School bullying incident, Shamima Begum citizenship deprivation case

Mohammed Tasnime Akunjee (born December 1977) is a British criminal law and human rights lawyer, and a political commentator. He specializes in terrorism and related fields, and his notable works includes the 2019 defamation case against Tommy Robinson, the Almondbury Community School bullying incident, and the citizenship deprivation case between the British government and Shamima Begum. In January 2024, he declared intention to run as an independent candidate for a Member of Parliament for the newly drawn Bethnal Green and Stepney constituency in East London, though he did not do so in the general election that July.

== Early life ==
Akunjee was born and raised in London after his family moved from Bangladesh to the United Kingdom in the 1970s fleeing the Bangladesh liberation war. Coming from a family of doctors, he entered the legal profession when he was 22 years old. He lives in North London, and takes an active part in several activist causes, most notably immigration rights, displacement, citizenship deprivation and Palestinian statehood.

== Notable cases ==
=== Huddersfield case ===
In late 2018, a viral video of one of the physical attacks brought national attention to the severe bullying of Syrian refugee children in a school in Huddersfield, West Yorkshire. The Almondbury community school, West Yorkshire police, Kirklees education services, Ofsted and the Department for Education were all alerted to the violent and racially motivated nature of the bullying. Solicitors were instructed to examine the safeguarding shortcomings of the school, given that the majority of the attacks occurred on school grounds and were recorded on its CCTV. Several attempts by the victim, a 15-year-old child who can only be named as Jamal, added to the liability of the institution.

Condemning the treatment, local MP Barry Sheerman, personally approached by Jamal for help, stated: "This young boy grew up in disturbed circumstances in a very dangerous environment and he came to England thinking it would be a haven of peace and instead found himself a victim of bullying.". The then-Prime Minister, Theresa May, called the scenes in the recorded attack "terrible" and "sickening" and praised the public support Jamal and his family were shown. Most notably, this included a GoFundMe for the family, which soon raised over £158 000, described by her as demonstrative of "the real spirit of the British people." Akunjee and his team declined to take payment for the work, pursuing the case pro bono. In 2021, Akunjee noted that due to the severity of the abuse, the priority of the legal team was to ensure that the child and his family could relocate themselves away from the situation, and accepting any of the funds was therefore unthinkable.

=== Tommy Robinson Defamation case ===
Following the outpouring of support towards the victim of the Almondbury Community School bullying incident, the far-right activist and English Defence League founder Tommy Robinson made a series of claims regarding the victim's character and actions, all of which he had since admitted were false. Under a threat of legal action by Akunjee, Robinson deleted the media in question from his social networks, however following a short reprieve resumed his attacks on the victim and his family.

In a subsequent defamation case against Robinson and Facebook in the High Court, likewise pro bono, Akunjee and Catrin Evans QC succeeded in securing £100,000 in damages for the victim, which bankrupted Robinson. Following the win, Akunjee stated: "Robinson's free speech is not being blocked in any way. He is being held to account for lying about a child."

=== Bethnal Green Girls case ===
In February 2015, four teenage girls from Bethnal Green Academy, Amira Abase, Sharmeena Begum, Kadiza Sultana and most famously, Shamima Begum, left their homes in East London, emerging 3 days later in Raqqa, Syria, having been groomed by the Islamic State. Akunjee became involved with the case due to association with the Bethnal Green area, the East London Mosque, and involvement with the repatriation of what he termed 'regrettees': people lured under false pretences into joining foreign terrorist groups, now seeking a return to their home countries. In 2015, Akunjee was tasked with negotiating the release and repatriation of a young British woman held in the custody of Al-Qaeda, and succeeded in reuniting her with her family.

Several institutional shortcomings led to the disappearance of the Bethnal Green Trio, and the Metropolitan Police later issued an apology to the families, who have been since the beginning of the saga in 2015 to the present day represented by Akunjee.

In the four years between the disappearance and the fall of the so-called caliphate in March 2019, Shamima Begum is the only surviving Bethanal Green girl. She was discovered in the Al Hawl refugee camp in Northern Syria by British war correspondent Anthony Loyd, having lost two children to malnutrition and nine months pregnant with her third, and her subsequent interviews led to a drop in public sympathy. Her citizenship has been revoked by the then-Home Secretary Sajid Javid on the grounds of her supposed right to apply for Bangladeshi citizenship given her ethnic background. However, Begum was born and raised in the United Kingdom and had no direct right to Bangladeshi citizenship, the Home Secretary's decision therefore rendering her stateless. Few days later, Akunjee, representing the Begum family, confirmed that Begum's newborn son had died from pneumonia, highlighting the conditions in the Kurdish-run camp, at that point severely overcrowded due to lack of alternative infrastructure.

Akunjee attempted to reach Begum in Syria to secure her signature for the appeal against the citizenship revocated, and was held back by Syrian forces guarding the Al Roj camp she had been relocated into for her safety following the series of interviews in which she expressed the wish to return to the UK and denounced ISIS's ideology and crimes. The legal case challenging the citizenship deprivation is ongoing.
