= Alba Sotorra =

Spanish film director (born 1980)

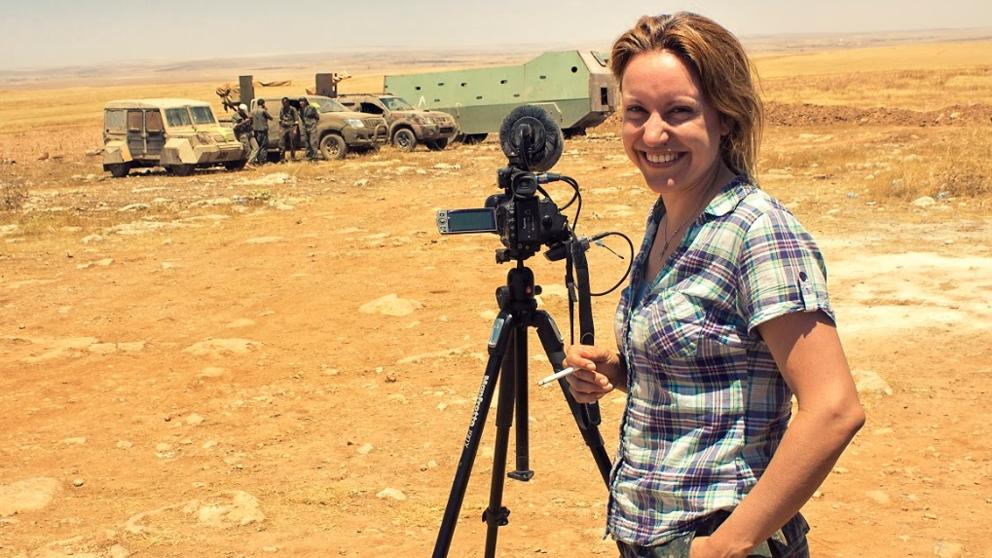
Alba Sotorra in Syria

Alba Sotorra (born 22 May 1980, Reus, Spain) is an independent film-director and producer of several documentaries. She has her own production company based in Barcelona.

== Education ==
Alba Sotorra grew up in Reus, Tarragona. She studied film at the Complutense University of Madrid, from where she graduated in 2004. Her last year she studied in Puerto Rico. She obtained a European Masters in Cultural Education from the University of Rovira i Virgili in 2007.

== Professional career ==
Unveiled Views of 2008 is a documentary which portrays five women Alba Sotorra met while hitchhiking from Spain to Pakistan.

Game Over was released in 2015, and treats the life of a man who is trapped in his internet world and in attempts to come free of it. It won the Gaudì Award of Catalonia for best documentary in 2016.

Comandante Arian was released in 2018 and is about a Kurdish female commander of the Women's Protection Units, who leads her troops towards Kobanî aiming for a defeat of the Islamic State. She is also a member of the Dones Visuales.

The Return: Life after ISIS of 2021 portrays Shamima Begum, Hoda Muthana or Kimberly Polman who had joined ISIS. It contains news coverage of the defeat of ISIS at Baghuz and has a focus on the de-radicalization of the ISIS adherents. It was nominated to the Goya Awards in 2022.

== Personal life ==
She has resided in Tarragona, Madrid, Berlin and Barcelona where she is currently based. Following her graduation in 2004, she hitchhiked to Pakistan. From Reus in Spain, the journey took her about a year and inspired her for her documentary Unveiled Views.

== Awards ==
- 2016 Best new filmdirector by the Colegio de Directores de Cataluña.
- 2016 Best Documentary for Game Over at the Gaudi Awards
- 2022 Best Documentary at the 50th International Emmy Awards for The Return: Life after ISIS
