= Begum v Home Secretary =

2021 Supreme Court of the United Kingdom case

- Court: Supreme Court of the United Kingdom
- Full case name: R (on the application of Begum) (Appellant) v Special Immigration Appeals Commission (Respondent); R (on the application of Begum) (Respondent) v Secretary of State for the Home Department (Appellant); and Begum (Respondent) v Secretary of State for the Home Department (Appellant)
- Decided: 26 February 2021
- Citation: [2021] UKSC 7
- Transcript: Judgment

Case history
- Prior actions: Court of Appeal (King LJ, Flaux LJ, Singh LJ [2020] EWCA Civ 918

Court membership
- Judges sitting: President Lord Reed, Deputy President Lord Hodge, Lady Black, Lord Lloyd-Jones and Lord Sales

Case opinions
- The Supreme Court unanimously allows the Secretary of State's appeals in each of the proceedings, and dismisses Begum's cross-appeal. Her leave to enter appeal, her application for judicial review of the leave to enter decision, and her application for judicial review of the Special Immigration Appeals Commission's preliminary decision in the deprivation appeal, are all dismissed.

Begum v Home Secretary [2021] UKSC 7 is the short name of three closely connected proceedings considered together in the Supreme Court of the United Kingdom, R (on the application of Begum) v Special Immigration Appeals Commission; R (on the application of Begum) v Secretary of State for the Home Department; and Begum v Secretary of State for the Home Department, concerning Shamima Begum, a woman born in the United Kingdom who at the age of 15 travelled to Syria to join the Islamic State of Iraq and the Levant (ISIS). Her intention to return to England in 2019 resulted in a public debate about the handling of returning jihadists.

The case was heard on 23 and 24 November 2020, and in a judgment delivered on 26 February 2021 the Supreme Court unanimously found in favour of the Home Secretary on her appeal against an Order of the Court of Appeal that Begum should be given leave to enter the United Kingdom, which it overturned. It also dismissed Begum's applications for judicial review of the leave to enter decision and of the Special Immigration Appeals Commission's preliminary decision in a deprivation of citizenship appeal. It considered that Begum's challenge to her loss of British citizenship could only be stayed until such time as she is in a position to play an effective part in it without the safety of the public being compromised.

== Facts ==
The daughter of Bangladeshi parents, Begum was born in London in 1999 and grew up in Bethnal Green, attending the Bethnal Green Academy. She held British citizenship under section 1 of the British Nationality Act 1981, as both her parents were settled in the United Kingdom when she was born. In a preliminary decision, the Special Immigration Appeals Commission (SIAC) found that as a matter of Bangladeshi nationality law she also holds Bangladeshi citizenship through her parents, as a result of section 5 of the Citizenship Act, 1951.

With two friends, Begum left Britain in February 2015 to go to Syria to join ISIS. A few days after her arrival there, she married Yago Riedijk, a Dutch-born ISIS fighter.

On 13 February 2019, Anthony Loyd of The Times interviewed Begum at the al-Hawl refugee camp in Syria, with the newspaper calling this "a major scoop". On 19 February 2019, British Home Secretary Sajid Javid decided to use his power to deprive Begum of her United Kingdom citizenship, relying on information not to be made public on the grounds of national security. He later said she would never be allowed to return. She was nine months pregnant at the time, and gave birth to a son within hours. Begum gave an interview to Sky News the same day, claiming she was only a housewife. Her case turned into a cause célèbre, and it was argued on her behalf that she was a minor when she left home, so should not be held to the same standards of behaviour as those who were of full age. On 3 March, Begum's Dutch husband said he wished them to live in the Netherlands, but he was then in a Kurdish detention centre in Syria, and if he were to return to the Netherlands he could face imprisonment for belonging to a terrorist organisation.

On 15 April 2019, it was reported that Begum had been granted legal aid to fight the revocation of her British citizenship. Foreign Secretary Jeremy Hunt described the Legal Aid Agency's decision as "very uncomfortable", but said that the United Kingdom was "a country that believes that people with limited means should have access to the resources of the state if they want to challenge the decisions the state has made about them".

On 3 May 2019 Begum applied for leave to enter Britain outside the Immigration Rules, under section 3 of the Immigration Act 1971 and section 113 of the Nationality, Immigration and Asylum Act 2002. She relied in part on Article 2 and Article 3 of the European Convention on Human Rights. On 13 June 2019, Javid refused this application, giving as reasons that Begum had not supplied a photograph of her face and a copy of her fingerprints and that the European Convention on Human Rights did not apply to her, or if it did there was no evidence that refusing her entry would breach her Convention rights. This further decision by Javid was later referred to as the "leave to enter decision".

In August 2019, under the Terrorism Act 2000, the Metropolitan Police asked the media organisations which had interviewed Begum, including the BBC, ITN News, Sky News, and The Times, to surrender any unpublished material they held about her to assist them in preparing a prosecution.

== Court of Appeal judgment ==
The three Lords Justices, Dame Eleanor King, Sir Julian Flaux, and Sir Rabinder Singh, were dealing with judicial review applications as well as appeals. On some of the issues before them they sat as a Divisional court, on others as the Court of Appeal of England and Wales.

On 16 July 2020, the Court decided that Begum could not have a fair hearing as a result of the SIAC preliminary decision on Articles 2 and 3 of the European Convention on Human Rights, so her claim for judicial review of that decision succeeded. The judgment said "Fairness and justice must, on the facts of this case, outweigh the national security concerns, so that the leave to enter appeals should be allowed." Begum's counsel had asked the Court to allow the deprivation of citizenship appeal and to quash the Home Secretary's decision, but instead the Court remitted that issue to SIAC to be decided de novo. This was reported by the BBC as "Shamima Begum can return for UK citizenship fight."

In reaction to this, the United Nations special rapporteur on Counter-Terrorism, Fionnuala Ní Aoláin, welcomed the decision, commenting "I commend the UK Court of Appeal for grasping the essential and absolute importance of the right to meaningfully participate in the proceedings depriving a person of their citizenship". The Court of Appeal ordered the Home Secretary to grant Begum leave to enter the United Kingdom and to provide her with the travel documents she needed.

== Home Secretary's appeal to the Supreme Court ==
The Home Secretary appealed to the Supreme Court on three matters:

1. The decision to allow Begum's application for judicial review of SIAC's decision on the Secretary of State's policy;
2. The decision to allow Begum's appeal against SIAC's decision dismissing the leave to enter appeal, and to order that leave to enter the United Kingdom be granted;
3. the decision allowing Begum's appeal against Elisabeth Laing's decision to dismiss the application for judicial review of the leave to enter decision, and again to order that leave to enter be granted.

Begum filed a cross-appeal, claiming the Court of Appeal had been wrong to reject her argument that her appeal on the deprivation of citizenship should automatically be allowed if it could not be fairly and effectively pursued due to her being prevented from entering the United Kingdom.

== Hearing and counsel ==
The Supreme Court hearing took place on 23 and 24 November 2020. Lord Pannick QC, Tom Hickman QC, and Jessica Jones, instructed by Birnberg Peirce, represented Begum. Sir James Eadie QC, Jonathan Glasson QC, and David Blundell QC were instructed by the Government Legal Department. There were also three Intervenors. Richard Hermer QC and Ayesha Christie were instructed by the advocacy group Liberty, and Felicity Gerry QC and Eamonn Kelly by JUSTICE, the British section of the International Commission of Jurists. The United Nations special rapporteur on Counter-Terrorism, Fionnuala Ní Aoláin, was represented by Guglielmo Verdirame QC, Jason Pobjoy, and Belinda McRae, who made written submissions and did not appear in court.

== Supreme Court judgment ==
On 26 February 2021, the Supreme Court, comprising President Lord Reed, Deputy President Lord Hodge, Lady Black, and Lords Lloyd-Jones and Sales, published a judgment settled by Lord Reed and agreed unanimously by the other justices which found that the Court of Appeal had erred in four respects:

1. It misunderstood the role of the Special Immigration Appeals Commission and the courts on an appeal against the Home Secretary's decision to refuse leave to enter the United Kingdom. The scope of an appeal in such cases is limited to whether the decision is in accordance with section 6 of the Human Rights Act, a question which did not arise in Begum's appeal.
2. It erred in its approach to the appeal against the dismissal of Begum's application for judicial review of the Home Secretary's refusal of leave to enter, making its own assessment of the requirements of national security, despite having no relevant evidence before it or any relevant findings of fact. Its approach failed to give the Home Secretary's assessment the respect it should have received.
3. It was mistaken in its finding that, when an individual's right to a fair hearing of an appeal came into conflict with the requirements of national security, the right to a fair hearing must prevail. If a vital public interest, such as public safety, makes it impossible for a case to be fairly heard, then it cannot ordinarily be heard. The appeal should therefore be stayed until the appellant is in a position to play an effective part in it without public safety being compromised. In this case, it was not known how long it might be before that was possible.
4. It mistakenly treated the Home Secretary's policy, intended for the guidance of Sajid Javid in the exercise of his discretion, as if it were a rule of law which must be obeyed and applied the wrong approach to considering whether the Home Secretary had acted lawfully.

In his reasoning, Lord Reed quoted from the judgment of Flaux LJ in the Court of Appeal decision, "Fairness is not one-sided and requires proper consideration to be given not just to the position of Ms Begum but the position of the Secretary of State." He underlined this by another quotation: "As Eleanor Roosevelt famously said, justice cannot be for one side alone, but must be for both."

== Reactions ==
Priti Patel, who had taken over from Javid as Home Secretary in July 2019, said the Supreme Court decision "reaffirmed the home secretary's authority to make vital national security decisions".

In Syria, Shamima Begum was reported to be "angry, upset and crying" and refusing to speak to friends in the refugee camp where she was living. ITV News filmed her walking around the camp at Al-Roj, but she would say nothing to them.

Sajid Javid, who had taken the decisions being challenged, welcomed the Supreme Court judgment and said

The Home Secretary is responsible for the security of our citizens and borders, and therefore should have the power to decide whether anyone posing a serious threat to that security can enter our country ... any restrictions of rights and freedoms faced by this individual are a direct consequence of the extreme actions that she and others have taken, in violation of government guidance and common morality.

Another Conservative politician, David Davis, said on Twitter

Disappointing verdict in the Supreme Court. Regardless of what individuals like Shamima Begum have done, the UK cannot simply wash our hands of Brits in the Syrian camps. The correct approach would be to return them to the UK to answer for their crimes.

Maya Foa, director of Reprieve, writing in The Guardian, stated that Begum was a victim of human trafficking and had been "reduced to a caricature". In an editorial, the newspaper disagreed with the judgment, claiming that "For Britain to offload Ms Begum ... is an abuse of position and of history."

In The Daily Telegraph, Patrick O'Flynn welcomed the judgment, commenting that it was a victory for common sense and came as a surprise, as judges rarely "cite the desire of the British public not to be placed in danger when the apparently inalienable right of some scumbag or other to a family life or to avoid the risk of persecution in another land is at stake."

Begum's lawyers issued a statement earlier in the day to say that if she could not receive a fair hearing, she should win her case to keep her British citizenship, relying on the finding of the Court of Appeal in July 2020 that Begum could not make her case from the camp where she was. The BBC's home and legal affairs correspondent Dominic Casciani said the imminent decision had "potentially major implications for Ms Begum's case and others like it."

In reporting the decision, The Washington Post said Begum's was the citizenship revocation with the highest profile and the case had divided the British on matters of extremism and human rights. The paper saw impacts on many other British women who had joined ISIS and were now in refugee camps in Syria with their children, noting a report by the group "Rights and Security International" which claimed the British government had a "systematic policy of depriving women in the camps of their citizenship". However, The Washington Post noted that France, Belgium, the Netherlands, and Denmark had also taken citizenship away from their nationals who had fought for the Islamic State.

CNN reported the Supreme Court's decision, quoting at length from its judgment, and added

The decision to revoke Begum's citizenship has come under fire from human rights campaigners and legal experts alike who argue that the revocation rendered her stateless and compromised her right to a fair appeal.

== See also ==
- Bethnal Green trio
- Brides of ISIL
