= The Return: Life After ISIS =

2021 British-Spanish documentary film

- Official poster
- Directed by: Alba Sotorra
- Produced by: Alba Sotorra; Vesna Cudic; Carles Torras
- Cinematography: Gris Jordana; Lara Vilanova; Núria Roldos
- Edited by: Xavi Carrasco; Michael Nollet
- Music by: Mehmed Berazi; Josefina Rozenwasser
- Production companies: Met Film Production; Alba Sotorra Productions; Ronachan Films; TV3 (Catalonia); Creative Europe
- Distributed by: Sky Documentaries
- Release dates: 17 March 2021 (SXSW); 15 June 2021 (United Kingdom)
- Running time: 90 minutes
- Countries: United Kingdom; Spain
- Language: English

The Return: Life After ISIS is a 2021 British-Spanish documentary film directed and co-produced by Alba Sotorra. It follows Shamima Begum and Hoda Muthana as they leave ISIS and attempt to return to their countries.

It had its world premiere at South by Southwest on 17 March 2021. It was released in the United Kingdom on 15 June 2021, by Sky Documentaries.

== Synopsis ==
Shamima Begum, Hoda Muthana, Kimberly Gwen Polman, among other women leave ISIS and attempt to return their home countries.

== Production ==
In February 2021, it was announced Alba Sotorra had directed the film, with Sky Documentaries set to distribute in the United Kingdom.

== Release ==
The film had its world premiere at South by Southwest on 17 March 2021. It also screened at the Hot Docs International Film Festival on 29 April 2021. It was released in the United Kingdom on 15 June 2021.

== Reception ==
Variety said, "These stories are harrowing, but the manner in which they’re revealed is gently optimistic, a testament to the patience and efficacy of Sevinaz, the energetic activist who runs workshops that encourage the women to confront the past and find solidarity in one another."

POV Magazine said, "speaks to generations affected by these conflicts and leaves us both informed and no less certain about what the just solution to the situation of these survivors should be."
