= Julian Flaux =

British Chancellor of the High Court

The Right Honourable Sir Julian Flaux
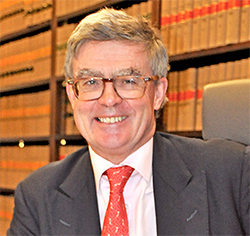
- The Chancellor of the High Court of England & Wales

Chancellor of the High Court
- In office 3 February 2021 – 1 November 2025
- Monarchs: Elizabeth II; Charles III
- Preceded by: Sir Geoffrey Vos
- Succeeded by: Sir Colin Birss

Lord Justice of Appeal
- In office 2016–2021

Personal details
- Born: 11 May 1955 (age 71)
- Education: Worcester College, Oxford

Sir Julian Martin Flaux PC (born 11 May 1955) is a British judge who was Chancellor of the High Court between 2021 and 2025.

== Early life ==
Flaux was born on 11 May 1955 and was educated at the King's School, Worcester. He studied law at Worcester College, Oxford, graduating as an Oxford MA and a Bachelor of Civil Law. He became an Honorary Fellow of Worcester College in 2017.

== Career ==
He was called to the bar by Inner Temple in 1978 and appointed as King's Counsel in April 1994.

He was appointed a Recorder in 2000, a Deputy Judge of the High Court of Justice in 2002, and a Judge of the High Court sitting on the King's Bench in 2007. He was a Presiding Judge on the Midland Circuit from January 2010 to December 2013, later appointed as a Legal Member of the Special Immigration Appeals Commission in 2013. Following a spell as Judge in Charge of the Commercial Court, he was appointed a Lord Justice of Appeal in December 2016 and sworn of the Privy Council. He was appointed Chancellor of the High Court on 3 February 2021.

In 2020, Flaux delivered the Court of Appeal's judgement in Begum v Home Secretary, granting Shamima Begum judicial review of the Home Secretary's decisions to revoke her British citizenship and to refuse her leave to enter the UK from Syria, where she had joined the Islamic State. The decision was reversed by the Supreme Court.

In December 2022, in a case brought by Alexander Darwall (owner of 4,000 acres (16 km^{2}) of land in southern Dartmoor National Park), he controversially ruled that a previously assumed right to wild camp without landowners' permission was legally wrong and that permission was needed. This proved to be a flawed decision: it was overturned on appeal in July 2023 and the appellate court judges' judgments made clear that they thought the initial ruling a peculiar one with Underhill LJ commenting that it is “a perfectly natural use of language to describe [camping] as a recreation, and also as occurring in the open air, notwithstanding that while the camper is actually in the tent the outside air will be to some extent excluded”.

He also led the panel that decided the extremely controversial "Freshwater Five" case, a judgment that met with widespread controversy.
