= Hodan Abby =

Australian teenager who joined Islamic State

- Born: 1996 (age 29–30)
- Other name: Umm Osama
- Citizenship: Australia
- Known for: One of the first Australian women to join the Syrian jihad
- Children: 1

Hodan Abby (born 1996) is an Australian woman who traveled to Syria to join the Islamic State of Iraq and the Levant in December 2014. She was 18 years old at the time and accompanied by a female friend; they were the first Australian women to travel independently to the conflict zone in Syria. As of July 2026, Abby was the last known ISIL-linked Australian woman living in Syria. She has been issued a permit to return to Australia.

== Departure for Syria ==
Abby lived in Lakemba in Western Sydney, New South Wales. She left Australia in December 2014, accompanied by her best friend, 20-year-old Hafsa Mohamed. Both young women were members of Sydney's Somali-Australian community. After her disappearance, Abby called home and spoke to her parents and refused to come back. Her parents and Mohamed's uncle traveled to the Middle East to try to find the two women and bring them home, but they were not successful.

== ISIL and after ==
Hafsa Mohamed was killed in Syria in 2015. While in ISIL, Abby took the nom de guerre "Umm Osama". She married to a jihadi fighter with the nom de guerre Abu Osama, and gave birth to their daughter in August 2016.

She has been accused of abusing a Yazidi girl known by the pseudonym Sara, who was about nine or ten years old when she was enslaved in Abby and Abu Osama's home in 2016. Sara only knew Abby by her nom de guerre, but after she was freed she found out “Umm Osama” was an Australian national, and she subsequently identified Abby as her enslaver. Sara stated she was sold eight times between different ISIL households during her years in captivity, and that Abby beat her and treated her the worst of every enslaver she had, and that she was raped by Abu Osama. Another Yazidi woman corroborated Sara’s story.

Abu Osama was eventually killed. Abby was wounded by shrapnel and still has a piece in her chest. Her daughter was also wounded and has shrapnel in her head, neck and hip.

After ISIL lost the last of its territory at the Battle of Baghuz Fawqani in March 2019, Abby was sent to the al-Roj Refugee Camp. Former diplomat Peter Galbraith described her as "very radical" and a "true believer" in ISIL ideology. She had allegedly attacked another woman with a hammer in 2021, and she admitted to receiving instructions and orders from ISIL commanders and passing them on to others within al-Roj. Because of her behavior, Abby was in the camp "prison" twice, in 2021 and 2022.

In 2024, Abby wrote a series of letters to the Australian authorities asking them to let her return there, saying she had been "tricked and trafficked" into Syria and forced to marry an ISIL fighter. She stated she’d gone to the caliphate at Hafsa Mohamed’s request and to defy her mother, not to join ISIL, and that “stupidity is not a crime.” Her father also pleaded with the Australian government to let her return there, saying Abby had renounced Islamic extremism and regretted having gone to Syria.

In February 2026, the Australian government issued Abby with a temporary exclusion order, which is designed to prevent someone who poses a terrorism or security threat from returning to Australia. In May, a group of seven Australian women and twelve children left the al-Roj camp and went to Syria’s capital of Damascus in an effort to return home. Abby was part of that group, but unlike the others, she was not permitted to get on the flight to Australia because of the exclusion order. She had the option of sending her daughter to Australia alone, since the exclusion order did not apply to the child. Abby chose to keep her daughter with her.

The exclusion order was supposed to remain in force until February 2028, but it was later revoked, and in June 2026 Abby was issued a permit to return home under strict conditions. As of July 2026, she remains in Syria with her daughter, who is now nine years old.

== See also ==
- Zehra Duman
- Amira Karroum
- Khaled Sharrouf
