= Zehra Duman =

Australian-born Turkish Islamist

- Born: 1993 (age 32–33); Melbourne, Victoria, Australia
- Citizenship: Turkish (by descent); Australia
- Known for: using social media to recruit volunteers for jihadism

Zehra Duman (born 1993) is an Australian woman who traveled to Islamic State of Iraq and the Levant territory, where she married a jihadi fighter.

Duman was a friend of Tara Nettleton, who traveled from Australia with her five children to join her jihadi husband Khaled Sharrouf in ISIL territory in 2014. Duman's online recruiting activities have been the subject of scholarly attention. Her Australian citizenship was revoked in 2019, but it was restored in 2023 after an appeal.

== Early life ==
Duman was born in Melbourne, a third-generation Australian of Turkish descent. She described her childhood as difficult and said her parents were divorced and she suffered from depression in her early teens. She attended Sirius College, a private school in Keysborough. Her school principal later said the staff "did not notice any extremist tendencies" in Duman. She did not grow up as a practicing Muslim, but became one by her later teens.

At age fourteen, Duman briefly dated a local boy named Mahmoud Abdullatif. After that relationship ended, she had no contact with him for years. In 2014, Abdullatif reached out to Duman again over social media and told her he would give her "a beautiful life." By this time, he was 23 years old and in ISIL territory, and Duman went there to marry him. She traveled to Syria in November 2014 at the age of 19, without telling anyone in advance of her decision, taking only a few sets of clothes with her. She later said her parents were "shocked, as I never have been public with my jihadi views. But also heartbroken" by her decision.

== Life under ISIL ==
Duman said that in Syria, she initially had to stay in one of ISIL's houses where unmarried women lived together. They took her phone and passport, and women were not allowed to leave the house until someone married them. After a month, Mahmoud Abdullatif married her and took to Raqqa, ISIL's Syrian capital, where they lived in a compound with other Australians he knew, including Tara Nettleton and Khaled Sharrouf and their children. The couple announced their union online on December 11, 2014, with a photo of Duman's dowry: an assault rifle.

She took the nom de guerre Umm Abdullatif Australi. Both she and her husband posted images from Syria on social media, including photos of people posing with guns. Duman often posted photos that included Nettleton and Sharrouf's children. One of her posts featured a photo of the couple's oldest son posing with a gun; Duman wrote she hoped the boy would have a "beautiful death". She also taunted Australian authorities, tweeting, "Catch me if you can." Photos Duman tweeted of herself and four other women, clad head to toe in black, holding AK-47 rifles, and posing over an expensive sports car, have been widely republished.

Duman has been described as an active recruiter of volunteers, a jihad supporter who claimed to want to personally undertake a suicide mission or engage in combat. She advised women who wanted to join ISIL to either travel there with a mahram such as their father or brother, or to commit attacks at home if they were unable to travel to the ISIL caliphate. When asked what she missed about Australia, she tweeted back a number zero by way of reply.

In an interview with SBS World News conducted over Twitter, Duman said people who were killed by ISIL deserved their fate: "Dawla would never harm anyone who hasn't did [sic] anything wrong." Her Twitter account was suspended in 2015, after she called for violence against non-Muslims, saying "stab them and poison them. Poison your teachers. Go to haram restaurants and poison the food in large quantities."

Duman's husband was killed in action five weeks after their marriage. After her husband's death, Duman said on her Ask.fm account that "alhamdulillah I have my sisters whom I love for the sake of Allah always at my house" and so she wasn't lonely. She told an SBS News reporter she was "actually so happy" for Abdullatif when he was killed because that was what he had wanted, and that she wanted martyrdom for herself as well.

According to her later statements, following the death of Abdullatif, Duman was immediately pressured to remarry and traveled to Mosul in ISIL-occupied Iraq. After her religiously mandated widow's mourning period was over, she married a man named Nedol, who was killed in an airstrike in 2016. By the time of his death, she was pregnant with their son. Seven months after the boy's birth, Duman says, she tried to flee ISIL territory and was jailed by them for three months, accused of spying and threatened with execution. A man named Baran offered to have her released from jail on the condition that she marry him and that she never use the internet again. She agreed, and she and Baran married. They had a daughter in late 2018.

Duman's third husband was killed in battle near Baghouz in January 2019. After his death, Duman left ISIL territory with her two children. By this time, her son was almost four years old, and her daughter was an infant.

== After the defeat of ISIL ==
In February 2019, the Australian Broadcasting Corporation obtained a video of Duman in the Al-Hawl refugee camp in northeast Syria. She said she had been living with Tara Nettleton when Nettleton died in 2015, and that Nettleton's three surviving children remained in ISIL-occupied territory and were "fine" the last time she saw them.

On 28 February, Dateline interviewed Duman's mother, who had recently heard from her. Her mother told Dateline that, by 2017, Duman had grown disenchanted with ISIL and wanted to come home to Australia, but could not because of ISIL's intense scrutiny of those living in its territory. She said Duman and her children were being held in poor conditions and that Duman had expressed suicidal thoughts.

On 14 March 2019, the Australian Broadcasting Corporation reported that an Australian woman who declined to identify herself, but who was believed to be Duman, was staying in the Al Hawl refugee camp, trying to return to Australia with her two children. She described a significant shortage of food, and she feared her six-month-old daughter would starve to death.

The New Daily reported that Duman and other Australian citizens had been taken from the Al Hawl camp in mid 2019. The Australian citizens were hooded, so they would not know where they were. They reported that the other Australians were taken to Iraq, where they met with Australian officials, while Duman was detained in an unknown location. There was speculation that she was removed for her own protection as the most devout followers of the ISIL philosophy in the camp disapproved of signs she had abandoned radicalism. In particular, she had stopped covering her head, and had taken up smoking cigarettes. She was returned to the camp without any explanation.

On 7 October 2019, Duman's Australian citizenship was revoked. In December 2019, the Herald-Sun cited Duman as an example, when it quoted an American official who called on US allies, like Australia, to repatriate their citizens instead of stripping them of citizenship. The official argued that stripping citizens of citizenship can backfire and trigger them to acts of violence.

That same year, Duman escaped from Al-Hawl and was detained when she entered Turkey at the border crossing at Tell Abyad. In September, a Turkish court in Sanliurfa sentenced her to six years and ten months in prison for being a member of an armed terrorist group. She denied having ever played an active role in ISIL and said she simply lived in areas controlled by the group. Two months later, she appeared before a court in Gaziantep and was ordered released from custody, because there was no one else to look after her children.

As of June 2021, Duman was living with her children in an unknown location in Turkey. She appealed the loss of her Australian citizenship and also sought Australian citizenship for her children. In August 2023, her citizenship was restored to her.

== See also ==
- Hodan Abby
- Shamima Begum
- Bird of Jannah
- Brides of the Islamic State
- Sophie Kasiki
- Amira Karroum
- Aqsa Mahmood
- Khaled Sharrouf
