= Al-Roj refugee camp =

Al-Roj refugee camp مخيم الروج للاجئين
- Refugee camp
- Location in Syria
- Coordinates: 37°03′46″N 42°05′34″E
- Country: Syria
- Governorate: Al-Hasakah Governorate

Population (2026)
  - Total: 2,300
- Primarily displaced persons from Syrian Civil War
- Time zone: UTC+2 (EET)
  - Summer (DST): UTC+3 (EEST)

The Al-Roj refugee camp (Arabic: مخيم الروج للاجئين), also known as the Al-Roj camp or simply the Roj camp, is a refugee camp in northern Syria, close to the Syria-Iraq border. Like the former Al-Hawl refugee camp, which was larger, it holds individuals displaced from the Islamic State of Iraq and the Levant, who were held captive at the camp by the Syrian Democratic Forces.

As highlighted on the Global Peace Index 2025, the camp is considered a significant source of stability for the ISIL group, as thousands of radicalized fighters and family members held within these sites facilitate the organization's persistence through recruitment and ongoing guerrilla operations.

== Background ==
Originally established in 2014 to accommodate Iraqi refugees, Roj camp in northeastern Syria underwent an expansion in 2020 to facilitate transfers from the larger al-Hawl camp, growing to house over 2,500 residents—primarily children and displaced Syrian families—by 2021.

By late 2023, nearly 100 third-country national families had been relocated to the facility as part of ongoing efforts to manage the region's displaced populations. While international observers, such as former UN Special Rapporteur Fionnuala Ní Aoláin, noted that living conditions in Roj were marginally better than those in al-Hawl, the camp continued to face significant humanitarian challenges, including restricted access to potable water, medical services, and educational resources.

Due to widespread financial depletion and harsh environmental conditions, residents often lack basic necessities, prompting large-scale humanitarian interventions. UNICEF—supported by international donors including Canada, Japan, Switzerland, and the European Union—has executed distribution programs providing winter clothing kits to people across the region.

It is considered a closed site, meaning individuals cannot leave without permission from camp administrators. As of 2026, it houses roughly 2,300 people, 60% of whom are children. Almost all the residents are foreign nationals; people there come from 60 different countries. The camp is entirely dependent on aid.

During the first half of 2026, accusations mounted of deteriorating conditions and abuses at the camp. By this time it was the only remaining camp in Syria for alleged family members of ISIS fighters, after al-Hol camp was lost by the SDF and closed.

== Notable residents ==
- Shamima Begum, a British-born woman who entered Syria to join the Islamic State in February 2015, at the age of 15. Her British citizenship was consequently revoked and she was refused re-entry to the United Kingdom with the decision upheld in the ensuing legal proceedings, Begum v Home Secretary. As of 2026, Begum is still in al-Roj.
- Zahra Halane, a Danish citizen who left her family home in Britain with her twin sister Salma to join the Islamic State, was transferred to a high security section of Al-Roj after trying to escape from the Al-Hawl refugee camp. Zahra and her son have been repatriated to Denmark. Salma is still in Syria.
- Ugbad and Rahma Sadiq, two of the earliest Norwegians to voluntarily travel to ISIL territory in Syria, were in Al-Roj. They have since been repatriated.
- Hoda Muthana, a U.S.-born Yemeni woman who emigrated from the United States to Syria to join ISIL in November 2014. She surrendered in January 2019 to coalition forces fighting ISIS in Syria and has been denied access back to the United States after a U.S. court ruling rejected her claim to American citizenship. The court ruled that when she was born, her father was a Yemeni diplomat, making her ineligible for American citizenship by birth. As of 2026, Hoda lives in Al-Roj with her son.
- Hodan Abby, the last known ISIL-linked Australian woman living in Syria. In 2026 she was issued with a permit to return to Australia.
- Gailon Su, a woman from Trinidad and Tobago who claims she was tricked into taking her son Su-lay to Syria by her new husband, Anthony Hamlet. Gailon has left Islam and is one of the few women in Al-Roj who do not wear an abaya.

== Repatriation efforts ==
Russia, Kazakhstan and some countries in eastern Europe have repatriated large numbers of their nationals from Al-Roj. France has taken back a few hundred people.

=== Australia ===
In early December 2025, The Guardian Australia reported that the Albanese government had declined an American offer to help repatriate about 40 Australian citizens from camps near the Syrian-Turkish border including Roj camp. These individuals are the wives, widows and children of dead and imprisoned Islamic State fighters. In June 2025, Home Affairs Minister Tony Burke had met with Save the Children CEO Mat Tinkler and repatriate advocate Kamalle Dabboussy, who expressed concerns that these individuals were being radicalised. In August 2025, Tinkler and Dabboussy confirmed that the US government had offered to facilitate the repatriation of the 40 Australians. While the Australian government has previously repatriated several nationals from Syria in 2019 and 2022, the Albanese government had declined the American offer due to concerns of a backlash from certain constituents during the lead-up to the 2025 Australian federal election.

A Guardian news report from 16 February 2026 stated that 34 Australian families would be released from the camp. Even though there were no criminal charges against the families, they might face charges when landing in Australia. The Australian government said no repatriation efforts were made by them, making it unclear where the families will go. On 17 February, it was reported that Australian government would not repatriate the 34 women and children released from the camp.

In late April 2026, a group of four Australian women and nine children left the Al-Roj refugee camp and headed to Damascus with the intention of returning to Australia. According to a Syrian official, their repatriation had been delayed by the Australian government for two weeks while they "put procedures in place" to receive the group. On 6 May, the Australian government confirmed that the group had departed Syria and landed in Australia on 7 May. As of July 2026, Hodan Abby was the last known IS-linked Australian woman living in Syria. She has been issued a permit to return to Australia.

=== United States ===
In July 17, 2021, former US diplomat Peter Galbraith organized rescue of Aminah Mohamad, an American orphan who had been hidden by radical ISIL women in Roj. Aminah's mother, Ariel Bradley, had taken the child to Syria when she joined the Islamic State. Ariel Bradley, who grew up as an evangelical Christian in Chattanooga, Tennessee before converting to Islam, died in a coalition airstrike in 2018.
