= Daniel Musser =

American Mennonite minister (1809–1877)

Dr Daniel Musser
- Born: November 2, 1809; Cumberland County, Pennsylvania
- Died: January 20, 1877 (aged 67); Lampeter, Lancaster County, Pennsylvania
- Occupations: Physician, Minister (1851), Bishop (1863)
- Spouse: Elizabeth (Betsey) Herr (m. 1832)
- Children: 2
- Parents: Henry Musser (father); Susanna Neff (mother)

Daniel Musser (1809–1877) was a medical doctor and a bishop at the Longenecker's Reformed Mennonite Church in Lancaster County, Pennsylvania, USA. He is best known for his 1864 book "Non-Resistance Asserted", from which Leo Tolstoy quoted extensively in his 1894 book "The Kingdom of God is Within You".

Musser belonged to the Reformed Mennonites, one of the smallest and strictest Mennonite groups, formed in 1812 and which, by 1906, had 2,079 members in 34 congregations, mainly in Pennsylvania, Ohio, and Ontario. The Church adopted the sixteenth century Anabaptist practice of banning and shunning to reform members.

Musser was unusual in being a physician in a community largely dominated by farmers and artisans. As a writer, he wrote with remarkable style and was well-read. American Mennonite historian Theron Schlabach described him as "the most systematic theologian of any nineteenth-century Mennonite group". However, John Funk was highly critical of Musser's book The Reformed Mennonite Church and her accusers.

Although Musser and Tolstoy agreed on nonresistance, Musser's views on government and human nature differed sharply from those of Tolstoy: Musser saw humans as basically evil, needing governments to control them; Tolstoy, on the other hand, saw governments as inherently evil, and humans as essentially good.

== See also ==
- Nonresistance
- Reformed Mennonite
- Mennonites
- Nonviolence
- Peace churches
- Tolstoyan
