= Kimberly Gwen Polman =

Canadian-American ISIS sympathizer

- Born: September 29, 1972 (age 53); Hamilton, Ontario, Canada

Kimberly Gwen Polman (born September 29, 1972) is a dual Canadian-U.S. citizen who travelled to ISIS occupied territory in 2015 and married an ISIS militant she had befriended online. In 2019, after she surrendered to forces allied with the United States, Polman told reporters that she deeply regretted her actions.

Polman was repatriated to British Columbia, Canada, in October 2022 and was placed under a series of bail conditions. She has been subject under a terrorism peace bond since November 7, 2023.

== Early life ==
Polman was born September 29, 1972, in Hamilton, Ontario, to an American mother and a Canadian father. She was raised as a Reformed Mennonite but later converted to Islam.

In 2011, the Soroptimist International issued her a Women's Opportunity Award. Her citation said she was working on a diploma in Legal Administration, and planned to work as a children's advocate.

== Time in Syria ==
Polman had taken an interest in nursing, and her online penpal, who said his name was Abu Aymen, told her that her nursing skills were needed in the caliphate. The two later married.

In early 2015, Polman travelled from Vancouver to Istanbul on her US passport. She told her family, including her three adult children, that she was going to Austria for two weeks.

Polman says she had grown disenchanted with ISIS by 2016 and tried to escape. She says she was captured and imprisoned in Raqqa, where she endured brutal interrogation and rape.

Polman was held in the al-Hawl refugee camp in Syria, where she was held with New Jersey-born Hoda Muthana. Polman's siblings told The New York Times that she had a hard life and that they had been unable to help her. Howard Eisenberg, an immigration lawyer in Polman's home town, told local reporters for CHCH-TV that he anticipated that her journey back to Canada could be a very lengthy one. Polman was arrested by Canadian authorities upon her arrival in Montreal, Canada, from Syria on October 26 under Section 810 of the Canadian Criminal Code. Her lawyer said authorities are seeking a peace bond.

Ian Austen, one of The New York Times's Canadian correspondents wrote about Polman, after discussing her with Rukmini Callimachi, The New York Times reporter who first found her in the refugee camp in Syria. He wrote that Callimachi speculated that Polman first identified herself as a Canadian to her American captors because she would be treated more leniently as a Canadian, only to realize that Canadians were much more likely to become stuck "in limbo". She further speculated that Polman then started to identify as an American as she realized that while Americans might face prosecution upon repatriation, at least they were being repatriated.

Polman's case was one profiled in a study by the International Center for the Study of Violent Extremism to examine whether individuals had been recruited to join ISIS solely through online coaching. Her interviews revealed she was lonely and vulnerable following a brutal gang rape that left her alienated from her children and community. She believed her recruiter, who promised her she could restore her honour and purity if she came to ISIS to volunteer her nursing skills.

== See also ==
- Bird of Jannah
- Islamic State Health Service
- Tareq Kamleh
- Aqsa Mahmood
- Hoda Muthana
