= Fionnuala Ní Aoláin =

Irish legal academic and U.N. Special Rapporteur on Human Rights

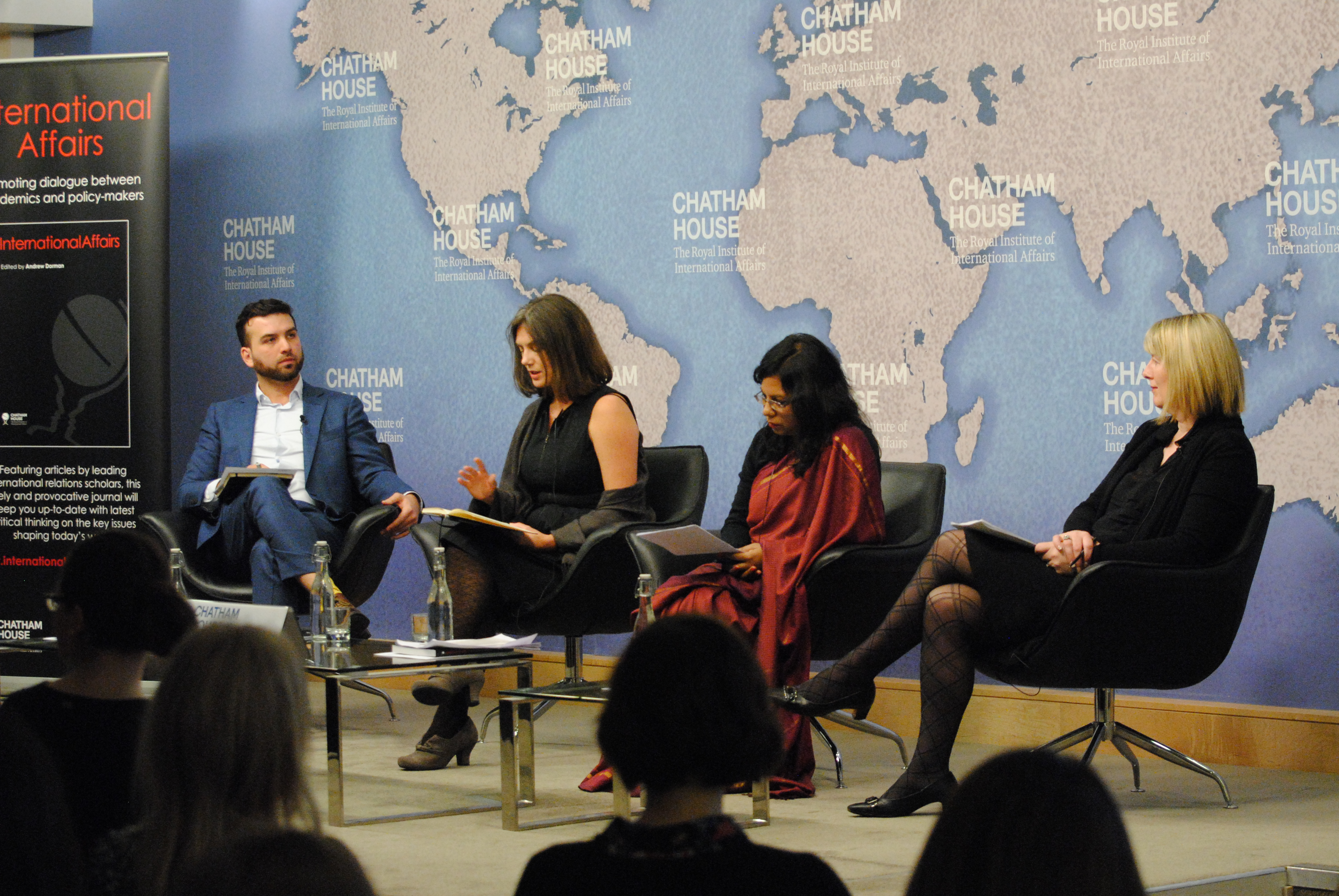
- Fionnuala Ní Aoláin on a panel in 2016 (far right)

Council of State
- Incumbent
- Assumed office 31 March 2026
- Appointed by: Catherine Connolly

Special Rapporteur for Counter Terrorism and Human Rights
- In office 1 August 2017 – November 2023

Personal details
- Born: 1967 (age 58–59) Galway, Ireland
- Education: Queen's University Belfast

Fionnuala Ní Aoláin (Irish pronunciation: [ˈfʲɪn̪ˠuəlˠə n̠ʲiː ˈiːlˠaːnʲ]; born 1967 in Galway) is an Irish academic lawyer specialising in human rights law. She was the Special Rapporteur on the promotion and protection of human rights and fundamental freedoms while countering terrorism for the United Nations Human Rights Council from 1 August 2017 - November 2023. In March 2026, she was appointed to the Irish Council of State by President Catherine Connolly.

== Career ==
Ní Aoláin graduated from Queen's University, Belfast (LLB 1990, PhD 1998), and Columbia Law School (LLM 1996).

She was a Visiting Fellow of Harvard Law School's Human Rights Program in 1994. At Columbia University, she was an Associate-in-Law at Columbia Law School from 1994 to 1996, and then a visiting professor at the School of International and Public Affairs, Columbia University from 1996 to 2000. She was appointed associate professor of law at Hebrew University in Jerusalem from 1997 to 1999. Returning to the United States in 2001, she was a visiting fellow at Princeton University from 2001 to 2002, at University of Minnesota Law School from 2003 to 2004, then returned to Harvard Law School as a visiting professor from 2012 to 2013.

Ní Aoláin was appointed by the Government of Ireland in December 2000 as a member of the Irish Human Rights Commission, the creation of which was mandated by the Good Friday Agreement. She was a consultant to the UN Women and the Office of the United Nations High Commissioner for Human Rights's Study on Reparations for Conflict Related Sexual Violence, 2011–2012. She is the Chair of the Board of the Open Society Foundations International Women's Program, and was Co-Chair of the Annual Meeting of the American Society of International Law 2014, with Oona A. Hathaway and Larry D. Johnson.

She served as chair of the Open Society Foundations International Women's Program, from 2011-2017.

She was an executive member of the American Society of International Law from 2009 to 2012, and of the Committee on the Administration of Justice (CAJ), in Northern Ireland. She is a member of the Irish Council for Civil Liberties, and was appointed by the Secretary-General of the United Nations as Special Expert on promoting gender equality in times of conflict and peace-making in 2003.

She was nominated by the Irish government in 2004 to the European Court of Human Rights, and was both the first woman and the first academic lawyer to be nominated.

She was concurrently professor of law at the University of Ulster, in Northern Ireland, where she teaches international law and international human rights law. She was the founder and associate director of the Transitional Justice Institute, with Dorsey & Whitney and as Professor of Law of the University of Minnesota Law School. She is married to Oren Gross, Irving Younger professor of law at University of Minnesota Law School.

In 2015 Just Security described her as concurrently serving as the Dorsey & Whitney Chair in Law at the University of Minnesota Law School and as a professor of law at the University of Ulster.

In 2017, Ní Aoláin became the Special Rapporteur for Counter Terrorism and Human Rights.

In November 2020, she intervened in the British Supreme Court case of Begum v Home Secretary, to do with Shamima Begum.

In June 2023, she released her final report on the Guantanamo Bay detention camp. The report concludes that prisoners endure "ongoing cruel, inhuman, and degrading treatment" and that the detention centre should be closed.

== Books ==
- Ní Aoláin, The Politics of Force – Conflict Management and State Violence in Northern Ireland (Blackstaff Press) (2000), ISBN 978-0856406683
- Ní Aoláin & Gross, Law in Times of Crisis – Emergency Powers in Theory and Practice (Cambridge University Press) (2006), ISBN 978-0521833516. This book was awarded the American Society of International Law's Certificate of Merit for its contribution to creative scholarship.
- Weissbrodt, Ní Aoláin, Fitzpatrick, and Newman, International Human Rights: Law, Policy and Process (2009) (Lexis Pub, 4th ed.) (2009), ISBN 978-1422411735
- Ní Aoláin, Weissbrodt, Rumsey & Others, Selected International Human Rights Instruments and Bibliography for Research on International Human Rights (LexisNexis, 4th ed.) (2009), ISBN 978-1422411742
- Ni Aoláin, Fionnuala, Hayes & Cahn, On the Frontlines: Women, War and the Post-Conflict Process (2011) (Oxford University Press), ISBN 9780195396652
- Ní Aoláin & Weissbrodt, Development of International Human Rights Law (2013), ISBN 978-1409441298 (Ashgate Publishing)
- Ni Aoláin (ed.), Gross (ed.), Guantánamo and Beyond: Exceptional Courts and Military Commissions in Comparative Perspective, (Cambridge University Press), (2013), ISBN 978-1107631717

== Awards and recognition ==
- Ní Aoláin was the recipient of 1992-1994: Lawlor Foundation Award, 1993-1994: Fulbright Scholarship, 1997-99: Teaching awards (Provost list of excellent teachers) - Hebrew University. Israel. Ranked among top 10% of all University teachers. 1996-97: Robert Schuman Scholarship (Civil Liberties Division of the European Parliament) 1998-2001: Yigal Allon (All Israeli University-wide Arard to a promising academic)
- Ní Aoláin was elected a member of the Royal Irish Academy in May 2019.
