= Khaled Sharrouf =

Australian-born Jihadist

- Born: February 23, 1981; Auburn, New South Wales, Australia
- Died: August 11, 2017 (aged 36); Raqqa, Syria
- Cause of death: airstrike
- Citizenship: Lebanon; Australia (1981-2017)
- Known for: Islamic State of Iraq and the Levant member, 2012 Sydney protests
- Movement: Islamic State of Iraq and the Levant
- Spouse: Tara Nettleton (1999–2015) (deceased)
- Children: 5: Abdullah (deceased), Zarqawi (deceased), and 3 living

Khaled Sharrouf (23 February 1981 – 11 August 2017) was an Australian jihadist who in 2013 travelled to Syrian territory to fight in the Syrian Civil War on the side of Islamic State of Iraq and the Levant (ISIL, also known as Islamic State). Born in Sydney, Australia to Lebanese parents, in 2017 he was the first Australian dual-national to have his Australian citizenship revoked under anti-terror legislation passed in 2015. In 2014, he posted an image to the Internet showing his nine-year-old son holding the severed head of a Syrian soldier, an act that was widely condemned.

Australian government officials confirmed he was killed in a coalition airstrike on 11 August 2017. The surviving members of his family were repatriated to Australia in 2019.

== Life, radicalization and death ==
Growing up in the 1980s, Sharrouf had a dysfunctional childhood. His father was physically abusive. When he was in primary school, his father took a second wife, who lived with Sharrouf and his mother. He was abandoned by his father for a period and expelled from Chester Hill High School in Year 9 for assaulting another student. During his teens he used LSD, ecstasy, and amphetamines for a sustained period of time. Sharrouf also became involved with petty crime, receiving minor convictions.

Growing up, Sharrouf used the given name "Carl". He did not begin calling himself by his birth name, Khaled, until he became a practicing Muslim. He did not grow up practicing the faith, but became introduced to Islam in his teens. By 17, he had married Tara Nettleton, a 15-year-old convert to Islam whom he had met at Chester Hill High School. They had four children between 2001 and 2005. In 2011, his youngest child was born.

After his marriage he associated with Islamic extremists, including the cleric Abdul Nacer Benbrika, who stayed at his home when visiting Sydney. His daughters called Benbrika "their sheikh." Imam Sheikh Taj El-Din Hilaly described Sharrouf "as an empty vase, which could be filled with anything, and it was filled with rubbish ideology".

In 2005, Sharrouf was arrested at his home in Wiley Park along with eight others during an Australian anti-terror investigation code-named Operation Pendennis. He was charged with possessing items to be used for a terrorist act (the items being six clocks and 140 batteries) and was viewed as a peripheral player in the terror plot. He said he wanted to leave Australia, saying, "Australian law get stuffed, finished… I swear I'd rather be locked up and tortured and everything in a Muslim country rather than be locked up one day in this country."

Psychiatrists said Sharrouf suffered from mental illness, likely caused by his drug use, with severe symptoms including delusions and paranoia. One psychiatrist testified that he sought comfort in Islam to cope with his mental illness which had led to his radicalization. Jamal Rifi, a local GP, said that Sharrouf was initially diagnosed as having depression, and later diagnosed with schizophrenia, an illness his brother also suffers from. Sharrouf was initially judged unfit to plead due to his mental illness. He was ultimately sentenced to three years and eleven months in prison; the judge later described his crime as "pathetic" and called him a "very sad, pathetic figure."

Sharrouf was released on parole in 2009 after a judge and psychiatrist "cautiously believed" that he would "abandon his radical beliefs". After his release from prison, Sharrouf was employed for some time by George Alex; Alex was later convicted of money laundering and tax evasion during this period. Sharrouf received disability payments for his mental illness following his release from prison, but subsequently fell back into radical Islam and into crime, reportedly carrying out violent exortions. The director of the Sydney prayer center Sharrouf attended in 2011 said Sharrouf was his close friend; he stated Sharrouf had always wanted to leave Australia and fight for Islam.

Sharrouf was involved in planning the 2012 Sydney protests regarding the film Innocence of Muslims.

=== In Syria ===
Sharrouf travelled from Sydney Airport to Turkey on 6 December 2013 using his brother's passport, and then travelled to the Islamic State. His activities received wide coverage in Australia in August 2014 after he posted a photo on social media of his son holding a severed head. The incident was condemned by Australian leaders and by the public. The incident raised concerns about Australian Muslims being recruited for terrorist activity abroad, and the possibility that the recruits would return to Australia and conduct attacks.

Sharrouf's wife and children followed him to Syria. While in the caliphate, Sharrouf purchased a Yazidi woman as his sexual slave. She later said she was one of seven Yazidi women enslaved in the house, which was on the outskirts of Raqqa, ISIL's Syrian capital. She said Sharrouf's children called the Yazidi women "infidels" and threatened to kill them. The Yazidis later sought damages under New South Wales's victim compensation scheme for their enslavement by Sharrouf, seeking to be compensated out of his assets, which had been frozen by the Australian government in 2014. They lost the case in 2019, as the victims' compensation scheme was limited to offenses that occurred in Australia, and because their enslavement was not a criminal offense in ISIL-ruled Syria or northern Iraq at the time.

Sharrouf was reported to have been killed on 19 June 2015 by a drone strike. His death was not confirmed, and later reports indicated he was alive and making threatening phone calls to people in Sydney. With his Australian best friend and son-in-law Mohamed Elomar, Sharrouf posted photographs of severed heads or dead and mutilated bodies. In February 2017, he was the first person to have his Australian citizenship revoked under new anti-terror laws passed in 2015.

On 11 August 2017, he was killed by a coalition airstrike while driving near Raqqa, Syria, along with two of his sons. When questioned, Department of Immigration and Border Protection Minister Peter Dutton said that Sharrouf's death would be nothing to mourn.

== Fate of family under ISIL ==
Sharrouf was married to Tara Nettleton, an Australian woman who had dropped out of high school, left home, and converted to Islam to marry him. At the time of their marriage, she was 15 and Sharrouf was 17. Their daughter was born in 2001. Her mother, Karen Nettleton, said Tara seemed happy in her marriage and practiced a strict form of Islam, wearing the hijab and going into a different room when her husband's brothers came to visit. The couple's two daughters also began wearing the hijab when young.

In 2014, Tara, her children, and Karen went on a vacation to Malaysia, where Tara told her mother she was taking the children for a visit to Turkey. They parted ways in Malaysia, and Karen did not know of Tara's plans to take the children to ISIL. After arriving in Turkey, Tara brought her five children to the Islamic State in Syria: two daughters and three sons, the oldest of the children being about twelve. Tara took the Muslim name "Ayesha". The family lived in a compound with other Australians and their families, including her friend Zehra Duman.

She and the children kept in touch with Karen in Australia over messaging apps. Tara said she wanted to return with her children to Australia, but her oldest son Abdullah did not want to leave and she would not leave without him. Tara’s youngest daughter secretly communicated with Karen about the possibility of escaping.

Tara Nettleton died in 2015, which her mother learned about January 2016. She died in Syria or Iraq following complications from abdominal surgery, at age 31; she reportedly had appendicitis or a perforated intestine. Her children posted a memorial video tribute to their mother online, consisting of family photos. Twice after Tara's death, Karen flew from Australia to Turkey to try to arrange for her grandchildren's passage out of Syria, but both times her efforts failed and she had to return home without them. Sharrouf also had a second wife in ISIL territory, a Moroccan-born woman, whom he married shortly before his death.

The two oldest Sharrouf sons, Abdullah and Zarqawi, began attending ISIL training camps after arriving in Syria. They posed for photos posted to their father's social media, sometimes with guns and ammunition. In one image, Abdullah, then age nine, held up the severed head of a Syrian government soldier. Sharrouf posted it with the comment, "That's my boy!"

In April 2017, Sharrouf posted a video showing him asking his youngest son, then six years old, about how to kill non-Muslims and Australians. The boy demonstrated with a Glock pistol and a machine gun how he'd carry out the killings. Several days later, Sharrouf made another post showing his six-year-old son standing in front of a man's dead body which had been cable-tied to a metal cross. The sign around the man's neck said, in Arabic, that he had been helping Christians.

Sharrouf’s oldest sons, Abdullah and Zarqawi, were killed alongside their father in the August 2017 Raqqa airstrike. Abdullah was twelve years old and Zarqawi was eleven at the time of their deaths.

Sharrouf's eldest daughter was married at thirteen years old, about a year after her arrival in Syria, and gave birth to a child at fourteen. The husband and father was Mohamed Elomar, an Australian ISIL fighter and friend of her father. Elomar was killed in an airstrike three months into their marriage. Sharrouf’s daughter married another friend of her father’s, a Lesbanese-born man, after Elmoar's death, and had another child.

Sharrouf’s younger daughter, who was 11 years old when she was taken to Syria, did not marry, but by the time she was 16 she was being pressured to do so. She was shot in the left leg in late 2017, leaving her with difficulty walking.

At ISIL's last territorial stand in Baghuz in March 2019, during a ceasefire, the three surviving children of Khaled Sharrouf fled together with the oldest daughter’s two children. They resurfaced in a detention camp in April. The oldest daughter said they had wanted to flee ISIL for a long time, but had been afraid to leave because they had heard terrible things about what happened to those who left. The Sharrouf children said they wanted to return home and live a normal life and posed no risk to Australia.

In April 2019, the children were reunited with their grandmother Karen Nettleton in the Al-Hawl refugee camp in Syria, and said they wanted to return to Australia. Australian Prime Minister Scott Morrison at the time said such an extraction was too dangerous, while Australian Opposition Leader Bill Shorten called for the children to be allowed home.

On 24 June 2019, it was reported that eight Australian children had been evacuated from a Syrian refugee camp, including the three surviving children and two grandchildren of Khaled Sharrouf. The Australian government evacuated the children secretly while working with aid groups. The oldest daughter, who turned 18 the day before her return to Australia, was heavily pregnant with her third child at the time of her evacuation. Her sister turned 17 the day the siblings arrive in Australia. Their only surviving brother was 8 at the time of his repatriation, and Sharrouf’s two granddaughters, a 3-year-old and a 2-year-old, were evacuated with their mother and the rest of the family.

Also evacuated were the three orphaned children of Australian ISIL fighter Yasin Rizvic and his wife, Fauzia Bacha. Scott Morrison issued a statement about the evacuation, saying, "The fact that parents put their children into harm's way by taking them into a war zone was a despicable act. However, children should not be punished for the crimes of their parents."

At the time, The Australian said that around 70 Australians were in refugee camps or detention centers in northern Syria. Around 50 were women and children, many "sick and injured." Officials said they would be psychologically analyzed before being brought to Australia and repatriated.

== See also ==
- Christchurch mosque shootings – 2019 massacre in Christchurch, New Zealand, by an Australian terrorist.
- David Hicks – Australian who trained with Al-Qaeda and was later detained at Guantanamo Bay
- Zehra Duman
- Tomasa Pérez Molleja
