= Sirius College =

Location
- Goulburn Street; Melbourne, Victoria; Australia

Information
- Former name: ISIK College
- Type: Private
- Motto: Reach for the stars
- Established: 1997
- Executive principal: Ahmet Yamakoglu
- Grades: Prep/Foundation to Year 12
- Colour

Sirius College, formerly known as ISIK College, is a private school established in 1997. Based in Melbourne, Victoria, the school, which has over 3000 students, has campuses in Keysborough, Broadmeadows, Dallas, Sunshine West and Shepparton. The college is a non-denominational school and accepts pupils from any ethnicity or religion.

== History ==
The school began in the 1980s as a community association and later a boarding house for disadvantaged Australian Turkish children. Its founders were linked to the Gülen movement. This developed into ISIK College in 1997. Additional campuses were added in Geelong, Mildura and Keysborough. The school changed its name to Sirius College in 2013.

== Notable alumni ==
- Zehra Duman, ISIS bride
