= Amira Karroum =

Australian jihadist killed in Syrian Civil War

- Born: 1992; Australia
- Died: January 2014 (aged 21–22); Aleppo, Syria
- Other name: Amira Ali
- Education: St. Hilda's School, Queensland University of Technology
- Known for: Leaving Australia to die in the Syrian jihad

Amira Karroum, also known as Amira Ali (1992–2014), was an Australian woman who traveled to war-torn Syria at age 21, after her husband Tyler Casey went there to be a jihadi fighter. Shortly after her arrival, she was killed alongside Casey in Aleppo. She was the first Australian woman to die in the Syrian civil war. Her brother-in-law, Guy Staines, is also reported to have died there, in 2017.

== Early life and radicalization ==
Amira was born and raised in Queensland in the Gold Coast area. Her father, Mohamed Karroum, was Lebanese-Australian and her mother was New Zealand-Australian. Mohamed, a non-practicing Muslim, operated a kebab shop. After graduating St. Hilda's School in 2009, Amira studied graphic design at the Queensland University of Technology. She became more religious upon reaching adulthood and began wearing a face veil.

In 2012, Amira moved to Sydney. She met Tyler Casey while he was working for Street Dawah, proselytizing Islam on the streets of Sydney. Street Dawah has been described as "extremist Islamist" by Greg Barton, the Director International of the Global Terrorism Research Center at Monash University. Amira's cousin was also part of Street Dawah.

Casey was a joint USA-Australian citizen who spent his teenage years in Colorado in the United States, where he became involved with gangs, then converted to Islam, became radicalized and worked with Al Qaeda. He was an international emissary for Al Qaeda and was trained for warfare in Egypt and Yemen, and received religious training in South Africa.

Amira married Casey in April 2013. After her marriage, Amira listed her occupation as "Slave of Allah" on her Facebook page. Her profile image was a picture of a garden with the phrase "Jannah is the motive".

In June 2013, Amira's husband Tyler Casey, who had adopted the name Yusuf Ali, flew to Singapore and then travelled to Syria. He said he was going to do humanitarian work, but some of the other worshippers at his mosque believed he was joining a jihadist group. One of the other worshippers at the mosque the couple attended later described Casey as "a very quiet, very gentle, a good natured person" and said "he wanted to go and help" in the Syrian conflict. He said he had heard Casey had secured housing in Syria and sent for Amira and said that the couple knew the situation in Syria was dangerous.

A few days before Amira's departure from Australia, her parents visited her for a few hours. Amira cried, and when Mohamed asked what was wrong, she told him she hated Australia. After she left her half-brother said the family had "no idea" how she came to be in Syria.

== Travel to Syria and death ==
After her husband Tyler Casey’s departure, a man named Hamdi Alqudsi became close to Amira, and promised to give her a new car and a thousand Australian dollars in cash, telling her, "I want you to feel like I'm your older brother." He would later be charged with recruiting seven men and assisting them in their travels to Syria to fight with Jabhat Al Nusra and other jihadist groups.

On 17 December 2013, Amira left Australia. She told her family she would be visiting friends, then doing humanitarian aid work after that. She spent a week in Copenhagen, then joined Casey in Syria and they settled in Aleppo. At the time, Casey was working for Jabhat Al Nusra. Neil Gaughan, the counterterrorism manager for Australian Federal Police, said Karroum was one of "a couple of women who have gone over as fighters--shooting guns--in Syria."

Three weeks after Amira left Australia, Amira and Casey were killed together in their house in Aleppo. Initial reports said the couple was killed by the Free Syrian Army, but later reports said they had in fact been killed by militants affiliated with the Islamic State of Iraq and the Levant, Jabhat Al Nusra's rival. Their bodies were reportedly dismembered after death. Casey and Amira were both 22 years old.

== Aftermath and legacy ==
Amira was the first Australian woman to die in the Syrian civil war. Her sister, Rose, said the family would attempt to bring Amira's body back to Australia.

Rose and Amira had been close to each other prior to her departure to Syria, and both were devout Muslims. Rose had been aware of her sister's plans to go to Syria, and had chosen not to share them with anyone. The Masjid Noor mosque in the Sydney suburb of Granville held a memorial service for Amira and Casey, at Rose's request.

Her family issued a statement saying, "Publicity and harassment of family and friends, which seems to be fuelled by the media, adds to our trauma and distress and does not help with our grieving process," and asked the media to not sensationalize the tragedy. Amira had left a life insurance policy worth $300,000, which the insurance company refused to pay due to her terrorist links. Her father argued the policy should be paid out because, he said, his daughter had been "tricked" into travelling to Syria and that it was not illegal at the time for an Australian to travel to Syria.

In an interview with A Current Affair in December 2014, Mohamed Karroum also announced plans to sue the Australian federal government and then-Prime Minister Tony Abbott over his daughter's death, saying "They are responsible," and "The Australian Federal Police and ASIO are not doing their job. It is a fact." He said Casey had been under surveillance but had been allowed to leave the country, and that federal police had raided Amira's home and seized her phone, tablet and computer, but did not prevent her from leaving the country one day later. Mohamed claimed his daughter Amira was "used as bait" to help catch senior Al Qaeda figures.

Her sister Rose was married to Guy Staines, a man who had embraced radical Islam while serving a prison sentence for murder. In 2015, less than two years after his release from prison, Staines left Australia and disappeared. He was thought to have travelled to Syria or Iraq. In July 2016, his family in Australia said they had not heard from him in over a year. In the spring of 2017, Staines was reported to have been killed in a drone strike.

Between June and October 2013, Amira’s associate Hamdi Alqudsi helped seven people travel to Syria to join the civil war there. In connection with this, he was charged with providing services with the intention of supporting hostile acts in Syria. He was not, however, charged with recruiting Amira. In 2016, Alqudsi was sentenced to eight years in prison. While still in prison, in 2019, he was charged with knowingly directing the activities of a terrorist organisation called the "Shura" which discussed terror attacks in Sydney. He was convicted in September 2022 and sentenced to fifteen years in prison.

== See also ==
- Shamima Begum
- Sharmeena Begum
- Zehra Duman
- Aqsa Mahmood
