= Reformed Mennonite =

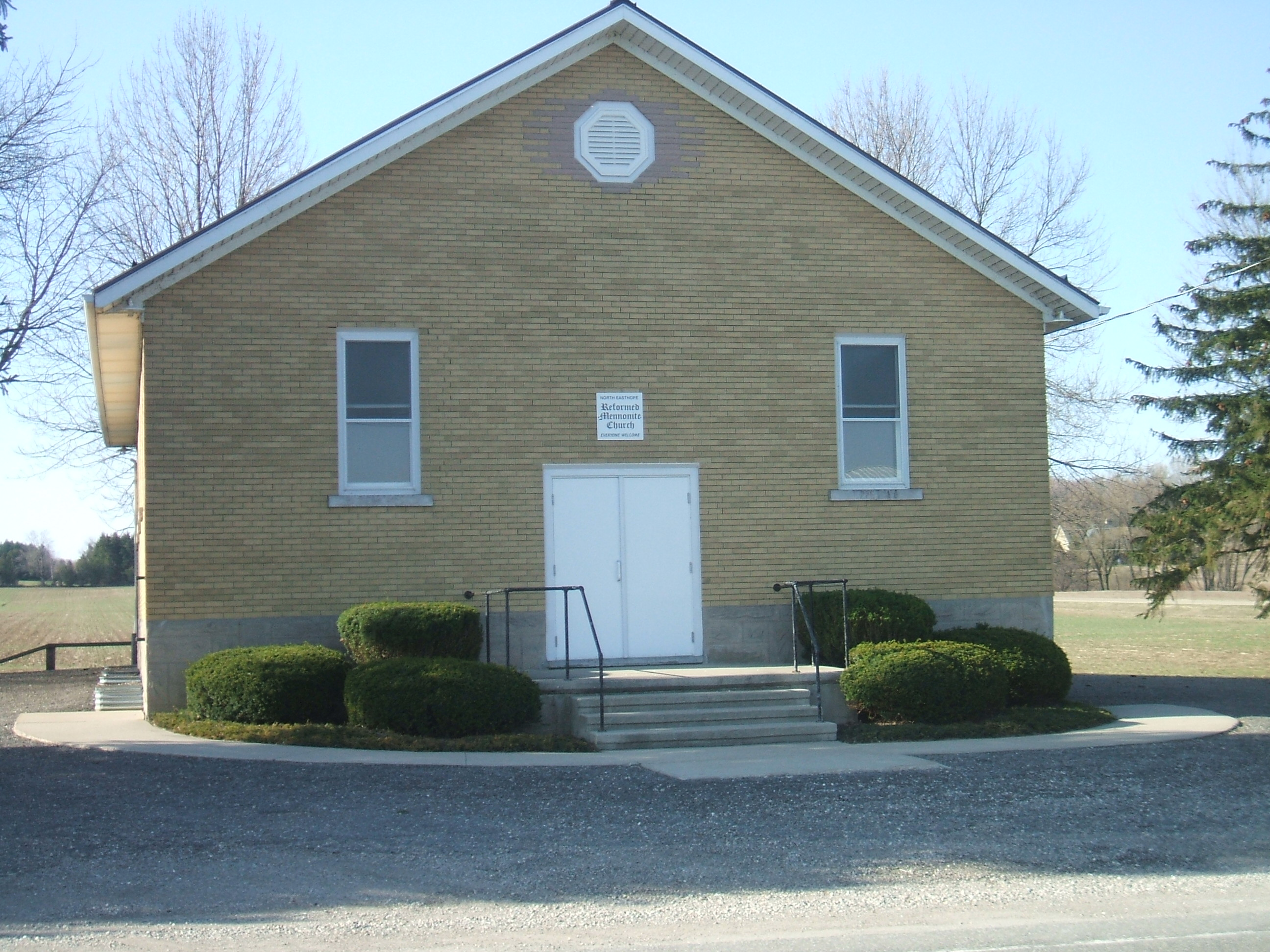
The Reformed Mennonite Church in North Easthope, Ontario

The Reformed Mennonite Church is a Conservative Anabaptist denomination of Christianity that officially separated from the main North American Mennonite body in 1812.

== History ==
The Reformed Mennonite Church was founded on May 30, 1812, in Lancaster County, Pennsylvania, under the leadership of John Herr, the son of Francis Herr, a Mennonite who had been expelled from the church. Herr split from the main Mennonite Church on the premise that the Church leaders were deviating from the original teachings of Menno Simons, and thus deviating from the true foundation of Jesus Christ. The new denomination retained the name "Mennonite" and identified itself as the only true Mennonite movement. Others, however, referred to followers of Herr as "New" Mennonites or "Herrites", and subsequently as "Reformed" Mennonites, which eventually became the denomination's official name.

The Church reached its peak membership in the mid-nineteenth century, at which time it included up to 3,000 members in Ontario and eight U.S. states.

It has experienced two divisions in its nearly 200-year history. In 1917, three congregations located in Huron, Richland, and Lucas counties in Ohio (along with a few members in Ontario) formed the New Reformed Mennonite Church under the leadership of Minister John Miller. The cause for the split was disagreement over whether funerals should be held in cooperation with non-Reformed Mennonite ministers and over the Church's support of the American Red Cross during the First World War.

The second split occurred in 1975 under Minister Willis Weaver, who organized the United Mennonite Church. In 1987, the group had 17 members located in Lancaster County in Pennsylvania.

== Practices ==
Reformed Mennonites see themselves as true followers of Christ's teachings and of the teachings of the New Testament. They have retained the name taken from Menno Simons as they believe what he practiced and wrote are in the true Spirit of Christ and the teachings in the New Testament. They have no church rules, but they rely solely on the Bible and a prayerful appeal to Christ and His Spirit as their guide. The Reformed Mennonites practice nonresistance and therefore do not go to war, practice self-defense, or sue at the law. They practice the Lord's Supper and believer's baptism on confession of faith. Upon meeting, members greet with a kiss of charity as taught in 1 Peter 5. They practice feet washing as taught by Christ in John 13. They insist on strict separation from other denominations, and excommunicate former members. This practice is considered by them to be out of love and concern for the former member's soul, and to be meant to remind those who have left the faith of what they have lost spiritually. The women members dress in conservative plain garb that preserves 18th-century Mennonite details at all times, the men members do so at meetings, church gatherings, and other official functions. Regular day wear for the men is modern conservative clothing. The men do not wear beards. Higher education is not frowned upon and members are encouraged to attend university and trade school. They permit the use of automobiles, radio, television, telephones, cell phones, computers, and internet.

== Membership ==
The membership of the Reformed Mennonite Church has been mostly declining since the death of founder John Herr in 1850.

The 1890 U.S. Census reported a membership of 1,655 in 34 congregations. By 1948, these figures had fallen to 733 and 24, respectively, and in 1958, the Church had only 616 members. By 1987, membership had further declined to 257 and in May 2000, it reached 171. A similar decline occurred in Ontario, which in 1948 had 6 congregations with 217 members. In May 2000, this figure stood at 131.

As of 2000, the single largest congregations were in North Easthope and Stevensville, Ontario, with 73 and 58 members, respectively. Congregations in Illinois, Michigan, Ohio, Pennsylvania, and Tennessee were considerably smaller.

Current estimates place total membership in the Reformed Mennonite Church at less than 300 serviced by no more than 10 churches.

Milton S. Hershey's mother was a Reformed Mennonite. Robert Bear, a Pennsylvania farmer who was excommunicated and shunned in 1964 and again in 1972 has since been actively and publicly attacking the church. This was still ongoing in 2017 at 87, he was given prison time for vandalism and disorderly conduct. His daughter, Patty Bear, wrote an autobiography that discusses his use of a public relations firm to control the narrative around the family and conceal his violence.

== Literary portrayal ==
Reformed Mennonites have been depicted in a variety of literature from the late nineteenth and early twentieth centuries.

Leo Tolstoy, in his book The Kingdom of God is Within You, praised the religious pamphlet Non-Resistance Asserted by Reformed Mennonite bishop Daniel Musser.

Helen Reimensnyder Martin harshly portrayed the Reformed Mennonite Herrites and other Pennsylvania Dutch groups in her novel Tillie: a Mennonite Maid (1904), a novel which provoked cries of misrepresentation from those who resented her depictions. Early in the story a young girl of Pennsylvania Dutch, but not Mennonite, background, joins a Reformed Mennonite group after listening to a funeral sermon but is excommunicated within a few years for allowing curls of hair to peek from her bonnet. The chapter depicting the funeral scene makes much of the Herrite prohibition of attendance at funerals of other faiths; to accommodate them, two separate funeral sermons are preached, and the conclusion of the first sermon by a Reformed Mennonite minister is the signal for the Reformed Mennonites to depart.
