= Hoda Muthana =

American-born former ISIS recruit (born 1994)

- Born: October 28, 1994 (age 32); Hackensack, New Jersey, U.S.
- Citizenship: Yemen
- Known for: Seeking repatriation to the US after joining ISIS

Hoda Muthana (Arabic: هدى مثنى; born October 28, 1994) is a U.S.-born Yemeni woman who emigrated from the United States to Syria to join the Islamic State in November 2014. She surrendered in January 2019 to coalition forces fighting ISIS in Syria and said she regretted joining ISIS, but has been denied access back to the United States after a U.S. court ruling rejected her claim to American citizenship. The courts ruled that when she was born, her father was a Yemeni diplomat, making her ineligible for American citizenship by birth.

== Early life ==
Muthana was born in Hackensack, New Jersey on October 28, 1994. Her father was a Yemeni diplomat, although it is disputed whether he was a diplomat at the time of her birth or whether he resigned months before. Muthana was raised in Hoover, Alabama and graduated from Hoover High School in 2013. She had a strict upbringing and her parents did not allow her to have a cell phone growing up. Her father gave her a cell phone for her high school graduation, which she used to set up a secret Twitter account, where over time she got thousands of followers and her online persona was that of a very pious Muslim. Over time her family noticed she became increasingly religious, but did not know that she had "met" ISIS members over social media and become radicalized. She attended the University of Alabama at Birmingham as a business major before leaving the United States to join ISIS in November 2014, using funds that her parents had provided for her college tuition.

== Time in ISIS ==
In December 2014, after a month in an ISIS guest house, Muthana married Suhan Rahman, an Australian ISIS fighter who went by the name Abu Jihad Al-Australi. On Twitter, she advocated for terror attacks against civilians in the United States and encouraged more residents to travel to ISIS-controlled territory and support their "caliphate". The Guardian would report years later that Muthana claimed her Twitter account had been hacked by others, and in a different interview ABC News, when she was asked about a tweet in which she called for the murder of Americans at Veterans and Memorial Day parades, Muthana would reply "I can't even believe I thought of that."

BuzzFeed conducted an interview with Muthana, her father, and a friend in 2015. Her father expressed regret at having failed to realize her plans in time to stop her, and described trying to convince her to come back. Muthana herself continued to express support for ISIS in her communications with the journalist. The friend said that there was a gulf between Muthana's real world self and the more radical persona she adopted on Twitter, offering as an example that Muthana claimed she had worn modest jilbābs and abayas since eighth grade, when she had only adopted modest dress recently.

Muthana's husband, Rahman, was killed in Syria in March 2015. She then married a Tunisian ISIS fighter and gave birth to a son. Muthana would later state that she began to question her allegiance to the caliphate around this time, but when she talked to the other foreign-born women about leaving, they were shocked. Her second husband was killed fighting in Mosul in 2017, and she fled from Raqqa to Mayadin to Hajin and finally to Shafa in eastern Syria. She married and divorced a third man around this time. Muthana befriended Kimberly Gwen Polman, a dual Canadian-U.S. citizen, when the ISIS enclave had shrunk to just a few square miles. Food was so scarce that they were reduced to boiling grass for nourishment. They agreed to try to escape the enclave, although Polman said that her first attempt to defect had led to her being imprisoned, tortured and raped. Muthana escaped from Shafa and surrendered to American troops on January 10, 2019. Both Muthana and Polman were placed in the Al-Hawl refugee camp in Syria. In February 2019, Muthana expressed her desire to return to the United States, said she "deeply regrets" joining ISIS, and told an interviewer that she had joined ISIS under a misguided sense of obligation as a Muslim to travel to the group's "caliphate". She described herself as having been "brainwashed".

In an interview with The New York Times, Muthana described how newly arrived female sympathizers like her were made to surrender their cell phones, and confined to locked barracks, where they were held available as potential brides for ISIS fighters.

== Citizenship ==
In January 2016, the Obama Administration revoked Muthana's passport, and stated in a letter that she was not a birthright citizen in spite of her US birth, because her father's termination of diplomatic status had not been officially documented until February 1995. She had been issued two US passports during the course of her life.

Donald Trump instructed Secretary of State Mike Pompeo to not allow her back into the country. Pompeo released a press statement that read: "Ms. Hoda Muthana is not a US citizen and will not be admitted into the United States. She does not have any legal basis, no valid U.S. passport, no right to a passport, nor any visa to travel to the United States. We continue to strongly advise all U.S. citizens not to travel to Syria." Her lawyer, Charles Swift disputes the government's argument regarding birthright citizenship, asserting her father was discharged from his diplomatic position a month before she was born. On February 21, 2019, Muthana's father filed an emergency lawsuit, asking the federal government to affirm Muthana's citizenship and allow her to return to the United States.

In November 2019, a federal judge ruled that she did not have American citizenship. In 2021, the DC Circuit Court of Appeals upheld the decision of the District Court, ruling that Muthana is not a US citizen. In 2022, the United States Supreme Court declined to hear her appeal. Her legal team called it "a sad day for the Muthana family, and for the sanctity of United States citizenship in general."

== Later developments ==
In April 2021, her sister Arwa Muthana was arrested for attempting to join ISIS with her husband, James Bradley. In September 22, Muthana’s sister and brother-in-law pleaded guilty to attempting to provide material support to a foreign terrorist organization. Arwa was sentenced to nine years in prison and Bradley was sentenced to eleven years in prison.

As of June 2024, Muthana and her seven-year old son were being held in the Al-Roj detention camp (along with over 65,000 suspected Islamic State members and their families) in north-east Syria by US-allied Kurdish forces. At this time she was well-known in the camp for being outspoken. She did not wear a face veil and scrawled F-ISIS on the wall outside her tent. She told CNN that "all she wanted" was to return to the US, and that she would prefer to serve time in an American prison.

In February 2026, Muthana and her son were still at al-Roj, and in an interview she expressed her desire to be "repatriated" to the US and face prosecution according to due process. She stated if she was ever allowed back in the United States, she would try to help de-radicalize young people. Muthana was interviewed by the Middle East Eye in August 2026, accusing live fire by Syrian Democratic Forces (SDF) soldiers of coming dangerously close to her child during a confrontation between the SDF personnel and some of the other women held at al-Roj camp. She communicated a series of accusations of brutality and bad faith on the part of the camp's personnel.

That same month, filmmaker Andrew Drury told the Daily Express that he was contacted from inside al-Roj in connection with a plot to smuggle Muthana and Shamima Begum, a British-born IS bride, out of the camp. He said Muthana contacted him and asked him for five thousand American dollars and/or British pounds, using code names for the currencies, to pay people smugglers. The plan was for the women to travel to Turkey after escaping from al-Roj; they believed if they could reach their respective embassies in Turkey, that they would be repatriated. Drury said he didn't send the women any money and instead informed the MI5 and his local MP about the escape plot. As of February 2026, Muthana is one of only about 2,000 people left at al-Roj; the camp had, at its maximum, held tens of thousands of people, almost all of them women and children.

== See also ==
- John Walker Lindh, an American Taliban fighter
- Shamima Begum, British girl who joined ISIL a few months after Muthana, and was later found in the same Al-Hawl refugee camp.
- Yaser Esam Hamdi, an American citizen that joined al-Qaeda. He was the subject of a U.S. Supreme Court case, Hamdi v. Rumsfeld. Hamdi was eventually deported to Saudi Arabia but only after renouncing his U.S. citizenship.
