= Mulberry Academy Shoreditch =

Location
- Gosset Street; Bethnal Green; London, E2 6NW; England
- Coordinates: 51.52739°N 0.06959°W

Information
- Type: Academy
- Department for Education URN: 137789 Tables
- Ofsted: Reports
- Executive Principal: Ruth Holden
- Gender: Coeducational
- Age: 11 to 19
- Website: http://www.mulberryacademyshoreditch.org

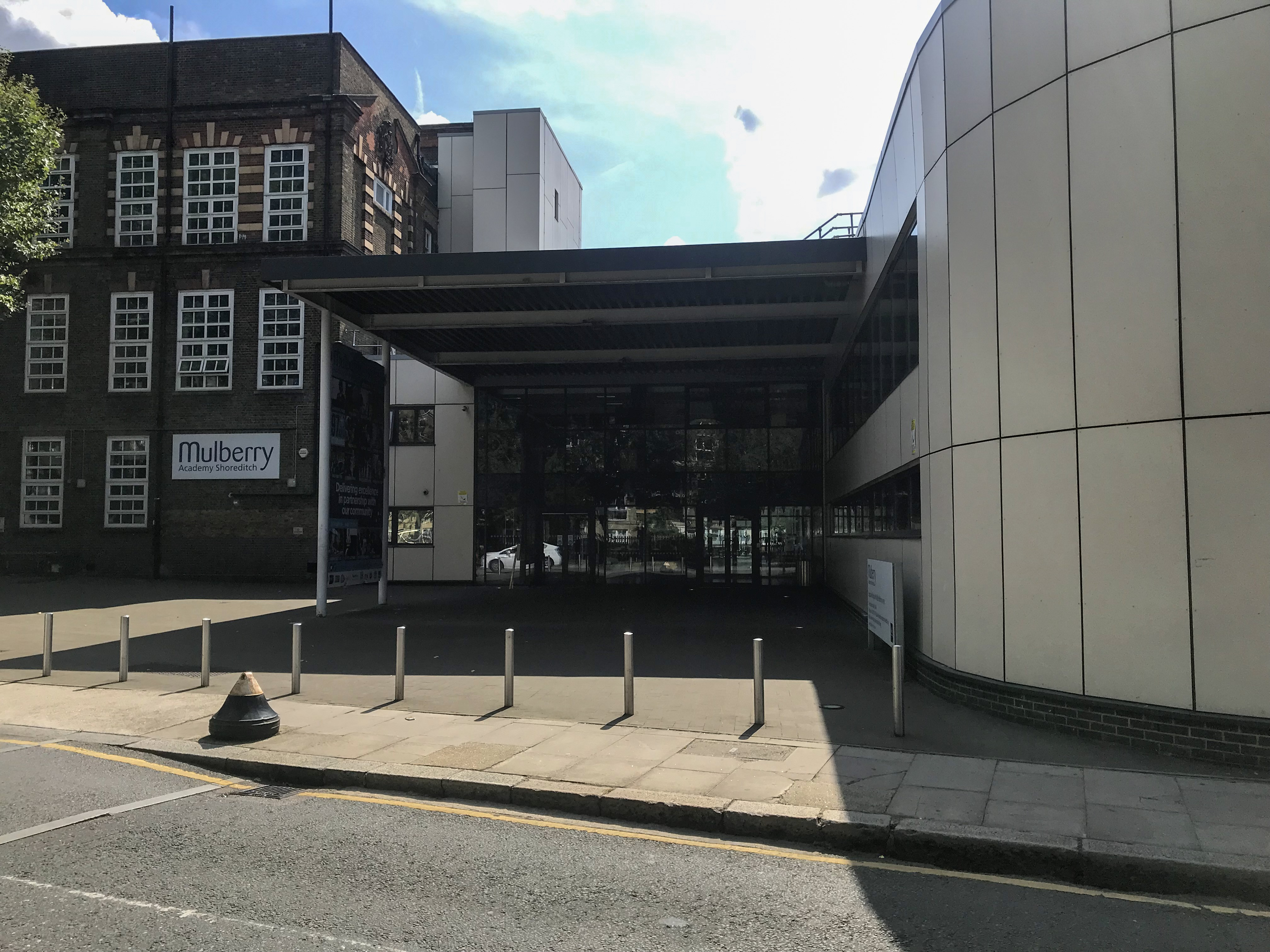
The main entrance of Mulberry Academy Shoreditch, on Gosset Street in London.

Mulberry Academy Shoreditch is a comprehensive co-educational academy for students aged between 11–18 in the Bethnal Green neighbourhood of the Borough of Tower Hamlets in East London.

The school was founded in 1959 as Daneford School, as a result of the merger of Mansford Secondary School and Daniel Street School. Beginning in 1997, the school used different names including Bethnal Green High School, Bethnal Green Technology College, Bethnal Green Academy and Green Spring Academy Shoreditch before adopting its current name in 2018.

== History ==
Mulberry Academy Shoreditch originated as Mansford Secondary School, which was founded in 1896, and Daniel Street School, founded in 1900. In the 1940s, the Kray twins attended Daniel Street. In 1959, the two schools merged to create Daneford School (a portmanteau of Daniel and Mansford), a secondary modern on Gosset Street. In 1965, Daneford acquired new buildings designed by London County Council, and became a single-sex school for boys. It acquired comprehensive status in 1973.

From the late 1970s, the area of East London around Daneford started experiencing increasing racial tensions, and Bangladeshi students at Daneford experienced racist attacks. The Campaign Against Racism in Schools (CARS) was set up at Daneford, and teachers took part in demonstrations campaigning for the Inner London Education Authority (ILEA) to adopt an anti-racist policy. In 1982, The Daneford Trust was founded at the school, a charity that facilitates youth overseas exchanges.

In 1997, Daneford School became Bethnal Green High School when it became co-educational and started accepting female students. Shortly after, its name changed again to Bethnal Green Technology College. In 2005, the school went into special measures as a result of an Ofsted inspection. The headteacher resigned and was replaced by an interim headteacher, Keith Holt. Mark Keary was appointed headteacher in June 2006 and in 2007 the school came out of special measures. Keary was praised by Charles, Prince of Wales in a 2008 visit for the use of teachers from the Teach First scheme in the school.

=== Adoption of academy status ===
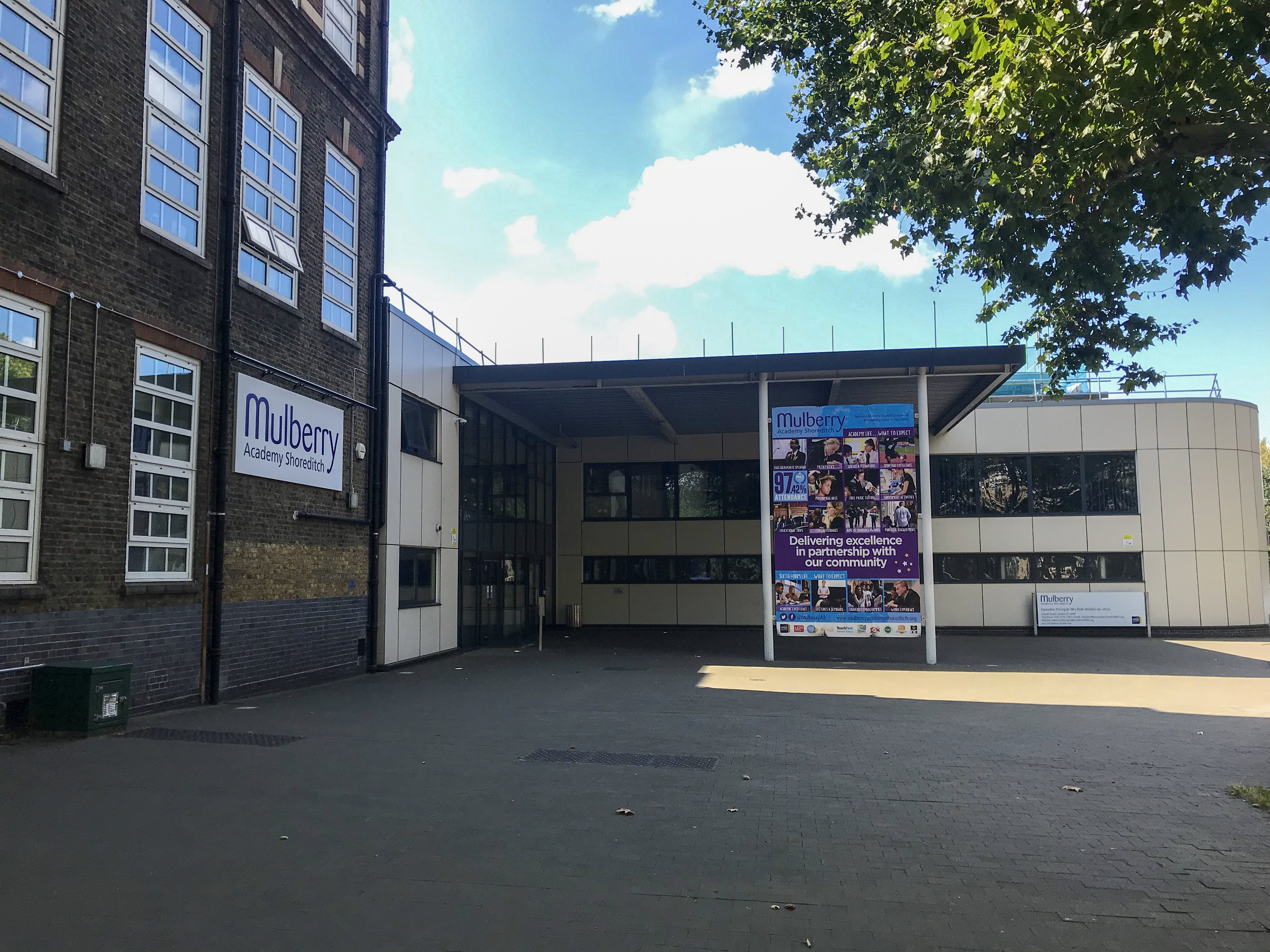
A side view of the main entrance of Mulberry Academy Shoreditch.

In 2010, the school benefitted from a £17 million refurbishment with money from the Building Schools for the Future scheme. Controversially, in July 2011 the governors of the school voted to adopt academy status. The decision was said to split the local Labour Party group on Tower Hamlets London Borough Council. The school became Bethnal Green Academy in January 2012 and a sixth form was opened in September that year. Bethnal Green Academy was rated 'Outstanding' in an Ofsted inspection in December 2012.

In December 2014, a female pupil at the school, Sharmeena Begum, left the UK to join the Islamic State of Iraq and the Levant (ISIL). In February 2015, three more female pupils known as the Bethnal Green trio - Shamima Begum, Amira Abase, and Kadiza Sultana - left via Turkey to join ISIL. Five further female pupils at the school were subject to a travel ban and were made wards of court to prevent them leaving the country. Counter-extremism officers from the Department for Education investigated the school.

In order to shake off the negative associations, the school was renamed Green Spring Academy Shoreditch in 2015. At the request of the AQA and Pearson exam boards, an independent investigation was launched into allegations of exam-fixing at the school. Its conclusion led to several staff, including the headteacher Mark Keary, being suspended in February 2017. Several teachers left following the disciplinary process. Keary launched an Employment Tribunal claim in response, arguing wrongful dismissal and disability discrimination. In 2019, he was cleared of any wrongdoing by the Teaching Regulation Agency.

In September 2018, the school was transferred to the control of the Mulberry Schools Trust and renamed Mulberry Academy Shoreditch.

== Notable alumni ==
- Shamima Begum – British teenager who went to ISIL controlled lands to be a bride of ISIL member
- Sharmeena Begum – former bride of ISIL member (unrelated to above)
- Anwar Choudhury – diplomat
- Micky Flanagan – comedian
- Andrew Johnson – actor and original castmember on EastEnders
- Isaac Julien – artist and filmmaker
- Kray twins – gangsters
- Michael McMillan – writer and curator
- John H. Stracey – former professional boxer
- Shafique Uddin – artist
- Michael Watson – former professional boxer
