= Anthony Loyd =

English author and journalist

- Born: Anthony William Vivian Loyd; 12 September 1966 (age 59)
- Education: Eton College
- Occupations: Journalist; war correspondent
- Employer: The Times
- Spouse: Lady Sophia Hamilton (m. 2002; div. 2005)

Anthony William Vivian Loyd (born 12 September 1966) is an English journalist and war correspondent, best known for his 1999 book My War Gone By, I Miss It So. He gained prominence in February 2019 when he tracked down a British ISIL bride, Shamima Begum.

== Biography ==
Loyd attended Eton College and the Royal Military Academy Sandhurst.

=== War correspondent ===
He went to school for journalism and then went to Bosnia with a vague plan to cover the ongoing war. He started taking pictures but almost by accident an American reporter offered to buy some that he saw. So Loyd became a war photographer supporting himself by selling photos for 50 Deutsche Marks per photograph. Much later Loyd was traveling taking photos with British forces around Travnik, central Bosnia and Herzegovina about 90 km west of Sarajevo. While covering a fire fight a French correspondent who was writing for The Daily Telegraph was wounded by a claymore mine set off by the Croat HVO forces. The wounded correspondent asked Loyd to fill in until the paper could send a replacement, Loyd agreed and so started his first job as a journalist. Afterwards he was put on retainer by The Times of London and regularly sent to war zones around the world.

Among the wars he has reported on are the conflicts in Bosnia, Kosovo, Chechnya, Afghanistan, Sierra Leone and Iraq. Loyd was noted for the risks he took in pursuing his stories. Based in Baghdad, he went out on patrol with both the American and Iraqi forces. His reporting was also carried by The New Statesman.

=== Shamima Begum ===
In 2019, Loyd found ISIL bride Shamima Begum in the Al-Hawl camp in Northern Syria. Loyd taped an interview with her where she stated she had no regrets about moving to ISIL-controlled territory.

=== Ukraine ===
When the Russians invaded in February 2022, Loyd was in Ukraine, and reported from there.

=== Author ===
My War Gone By, I Miss It So, is a book based on his experiences in Bosnia and Chechnya. In the book Loyd staggers chapters about war in Bosnia, Chechnya, and boredom tinged with heroin addiction in London.

He published a second volume of autobiography, Another Bloody Love Letter, in 2007. It covered his experiences in the former Yugoslavia, Sierra Leone, Afghanistan and Iraq.

=== Awards ===
In the British Press Awards, Loyd won foreign correspondent of the year five times. He twice won the Prix Bayeux-Calvados for war correspondents.

=== Personal life ===
Loyd married Lady Sophia Hamilton, daughter of James Hamilton, 5th Duke of Abercorn in 2002 at Baronscourt, the Duke's 5,500 acre (22 km²) ancestral estate, near Omagh, County Tyrone, Northern Ireland. They were divorced in 2005, on an amicable basis, occasioned by Loyd's frequent absences reporting on wars. He remarried in 2007 and, as of 2008, was based in Devon with his wife, daughter and stepdaughter.

While reporting in Northern Syria (2014), he was shot twice in the leg by Syrian rebels to stop him running away.

=== Family ===
His paternal grandfather was Captain Vivian Loyd MC (1894-1972), a British army Captain and inventor and manufacturer of tanks and military vehicles. His maternal great-grandfather was Lieutenant General Sir Adrian Carton de Wiart (1880–1963). His great-grandfather was not only a highly decorated British soldier, he was also one of the most wounded (eleven times, which included the loss of an eye and a hand).

== Bibliography ==
=== Books ===
- My war gone by, I miss it so. September Publishing. 1999.
- Another Bloody Love Letter. Headline Review. 8 March 2007. ISBN 978-0-7553-1479-9.

=== Articles ===
- "'We have just defeated a superpower'". Letter from Afghanistan. New Statesman. 149 (5514): 50–51. 3–23 April 2020.

=== Book reviews ===
Year	Review article	Work(s) reviewed
2014	"The enemy at my table". New Statesman. 143 (5237): 49. 21–27 November 2014.	Powell, Jonathan (2014). Talking to terrorists : how to end armed conflicts. London: Bodley Head.

== Sources ==
- Eden, Richard (20 January 2013). "Kate Rothschild makes new marriage vow". The Telegraph.
