= Leave to enter =

Immigration status in the United Kingdom

Leave to enter is the permission given by British immigration officers for entry to the United Kingdom and the Crown Dependencies.

Under the Immigration Rules (a key piece of immigration legislation in the UK), anyone who does not have right of abode requires leave to enter. Generally, only British citizens (though not all British nationals) and some Commonwealth citizens have right of abode. Under the Common Travel Area provisions, Irish citizens do not require leave to enter or remain, unless they have been excluded from this right by the UK Government. Leave to enter is required at any point of entry, including through the Channel Tunnel and the land border with Ireland.

A person who has been granted leave to enter does not necessarily have the automatic right to enter Britain. The ultimate decision of entry is made by an immigration officer at the port of entry under paragraph 2A of Schedule 2 to the Immigration Act 1971.

== Process and conditions ==
Non-visa nationals may seek leave to enter on arrival in the UK if they are visiting the UK for a period not exceeding six months. Visa nationals – and non-visa nationals who wish to enter other than to visit, or to visit for more than six months – must have entry clearance in advance of departing the UK, or they will not be granted leave to enter on arrival.

=== Conditions ===
Leave to enter grants a person subject to immigration control permission to enter Britain for a limited period only, and may be subject to a number of conditions:

1. a restriction on employment or occupation in the United Kingdom;
2. a condition requiring the person to maintain and accommodate himself, and any dependants of his, without recourse to public funds; and
3. a condition requiring the person to register with the police.

The time limit of any leave to enter depends upon individual circumstances and is provided to the applicant in person.

== Crown Dependencies ==
The Immigration Act 1971 was extended to Jersey, Guernsey and the Isle of Man. Each territory has their own Immigration Rules that mirror those made by the UK Government, and therefore leave to enter the United Kingdom or one of the territories is also leave to enter any of them, regardless of where they are granted. Where required, entry clearance must be obtained from the UK Government in order to travel to any of the three territories.

== Common Travel Area ==
The Common Travel Area is an open border agreement between the United Kingdom, Ireland, the Isle of Man and the Channel Islands. Leave to enter is not required to enter the UK or the other British islands within the area from Ireland, except for those only in transit through Ireland or who require a visa to enter to the UK. Leave to enter is also required for those in Ireland unlawfully or who are excluded from the UK by direction of the UK Government.

== Leave outside the Immigration Rules ==
On their discretion, the Secretary of State has the power to grant leave outside the Immigration Rules (LOTR) from the residual discretion under the Immigration Act 1971.

LOTR on compelling compassionate grounds may be granted where the decision maker decides that the specific circumstances of the case includes exceptional circumstances. These circumstances will mean that a refusal would result in unjustifiably harsh consequences for the applicant or their family, but which do not render refusal a breach of ECHR Article 8, Article 3, refugee convention or other obligations. (Note: Text reused under the Open Government Licence v3.0.)

== See also ==
- Visa policy of the United Kingdom
