= Al-Hawl refugee camp =

Refugee camp in Syria

Al-Hawl refugee camp مخيم الهول للاجئين
- Refugee camp
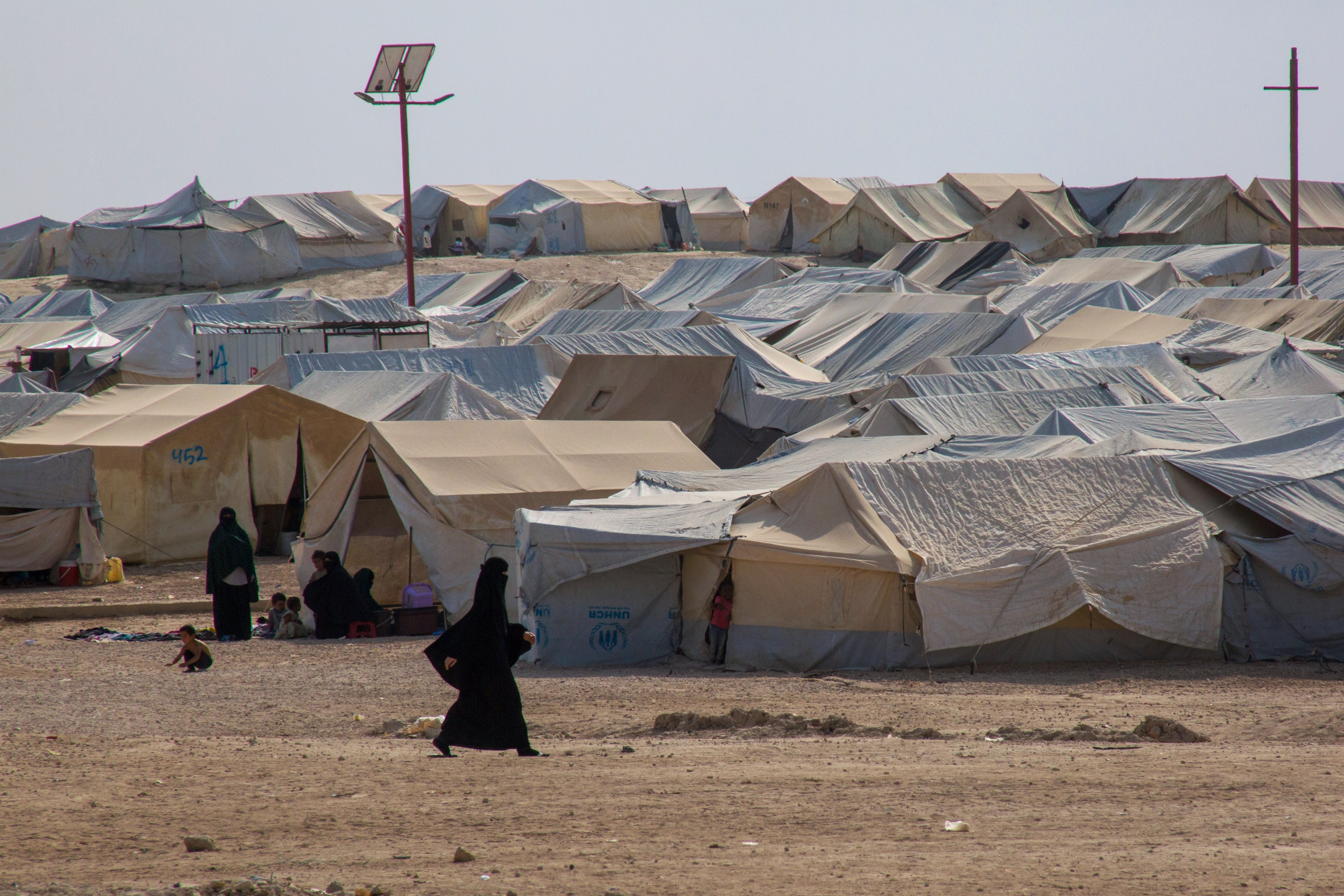
- The camp in October 2019

- Location in Syria
- Coordinates: 36°22′32″N 41°08′55″E
- Country: Syria
- Governorate: Al-Hasakah Governorate
- District: Al-Hasakah District
- Established: 1991
- Disestablishment: 22 February 2026
- Time zone: UTC+2 (EET)
  - Summer (DST): UTC+3 (EEST)

The Al-Hawl refugee camp (also Al-Hol refugee camp or simply Al-Hawl camp, Arabic: مخيم الهول للاجئين, Kurdish: کەمپی ھۆڵ, romanized: Kempa holê) was a refugee camp on the southern outskirts of the town of al-Hawl in northern Syria, close to the Syria-Iraq border, which held individuals displaced from the Islamic State of Iraq and the Levant (ISIL).

== Background ==
The camp was originally established for Iraqi refugees in early 1991, during the Gulf War, and was later reopened after the 2003 invasion of Iraq as one of three camps at the Iraqi–Syrian border.

== Demographics ==
At the beginning of 2019 the camp held about 10,000 people, but then its size increased dramatically with the collapse of ISIL. An estimate in September 2019 indicated that the camp held about 20,000 women and 50,000 children from the former Islamic State of Iraq and the Levant (ISIL), guarded by 400 SDF militia fighters. Their husbands and teenage sons were not present, being held at other camps.

In February 2021, the camp's population was more than 60,000 having grown from 10,000 at the beginning of 2019 after the SDF took the last of the Islamic State's territory in Syria in the Battle of Baghuz Fawqani. The refugees were women and children from many countries, primarily Syria and Iraq.

In mid-2023, the camp population had fallen below 50,000 due to repatriations. In 2024, it was reported that the majority of the camp's residents were children, and that more than half of those were 11 years old or younger. Boys were to be isolated from their mothers once they turned 14 according to SDF policy, though some were separated at as young as 11.

By late 2025, the camp population had fallen to 25,183 people, mostly due to repatriations to Iraq.

It was estimated that around 1,000 European citizens were in the Syrian internally displaced persons camps, located almost exclusively in Al-Hawl, of whom more than 600 are children.

== Administration and conditions in the camp ==
In the context of the Syrian Civil War and the takeover of al-Hawl by the SDF, the camp, alongside the Ayn Issa refugee camp became a center for refugees from the fighting between the SDF and ISIL during the SDF campaign in Deir ez-Zor and the camp held approximately 10,000 refugees in early December 2018. In April 2018, a typhoid outbreak killed 24 people in the camp.

During the Battle of Baghuz Fawqani in December 2018, the camp saw a massive influx of refugees in a series of massive civilian evacuations, with people fleeing the fierce fighting between the SDF and ISIL. Conditions along the road to the camp, including in screening centers for ISIL operatives, have been described as "extremely harsh" with limited food, water, shelter and no health services. As of 4 February 2019, at least 35 children and newborns had also reportedly died either en route or shortly after arriving in the camp, mostly due to hypothermia. Aid organizations feared dysentery and other diseases could break out from the overflowing camp. The UN stated that 84 people, mostly children, died on the way to al-Hawl since December 2018. Families of ISIL fighters were kept at a separate guarded section of the camp after repeated violent incidents between them and other members of the camp.

Voice of America report on the al-Hawl refugee camp, 7 February 2019

In February 2019, Zehra Duman, an Australian who married an Australian jihadi fighter shortly after her arrival, told her mother she and her two young children were living in the camp. She told her mother that there was a terrible shortage of food, and she feared her six-month-old daughter would starve to death. In early 2019, pregnant ISIL member Shamima Begum was found in the al-Hawl camp. Her newborn son died within weeks of birth. In March 2019, the former American citizen and former ISIL member Hoda Muthana and her 18-month-old son were also reported to be living in the camp.

At least 100 people have died during the trip, or shortly after arriving at the camp since December 2018.

In April 2019, women and girls at the camp told a female journalist, "Convert, convert!" urging her to recite the shahada. They told her, "If you became Muslim and cover (your body and face) like us and became a member of our religion, you would not be killed". Many of them prayed for the caliphate of ISIL to return. The women justified the genocide of Yazidis by ISIL and ISIL's taking of Yazidi sex slaves. An Iraqi woman said, "If they don't convert to Islam and they don't become Muslim like us and worship Allah, then they deserve it."

In a report published in April 2019, BBC journalist Quentin Sommerville described the camp as "an overflowing vessel of anger and unanswered questions", where some women "cling to their hate-fuelled ideology, others beg for a way out - a way home." Quentin quoted a Moroccan-Belgian woman, a former nurse who grabbed her niqab saying: "This is my choice. In Belgium I couldn't wear my niqab - this is my choice. Every religion did something wrong, show us the good." The woman saw there was no need to apologise for the ISIL attack in Brussels in 2016 and blamed the West and its air-strikes on Baghouz for their dire conditions.

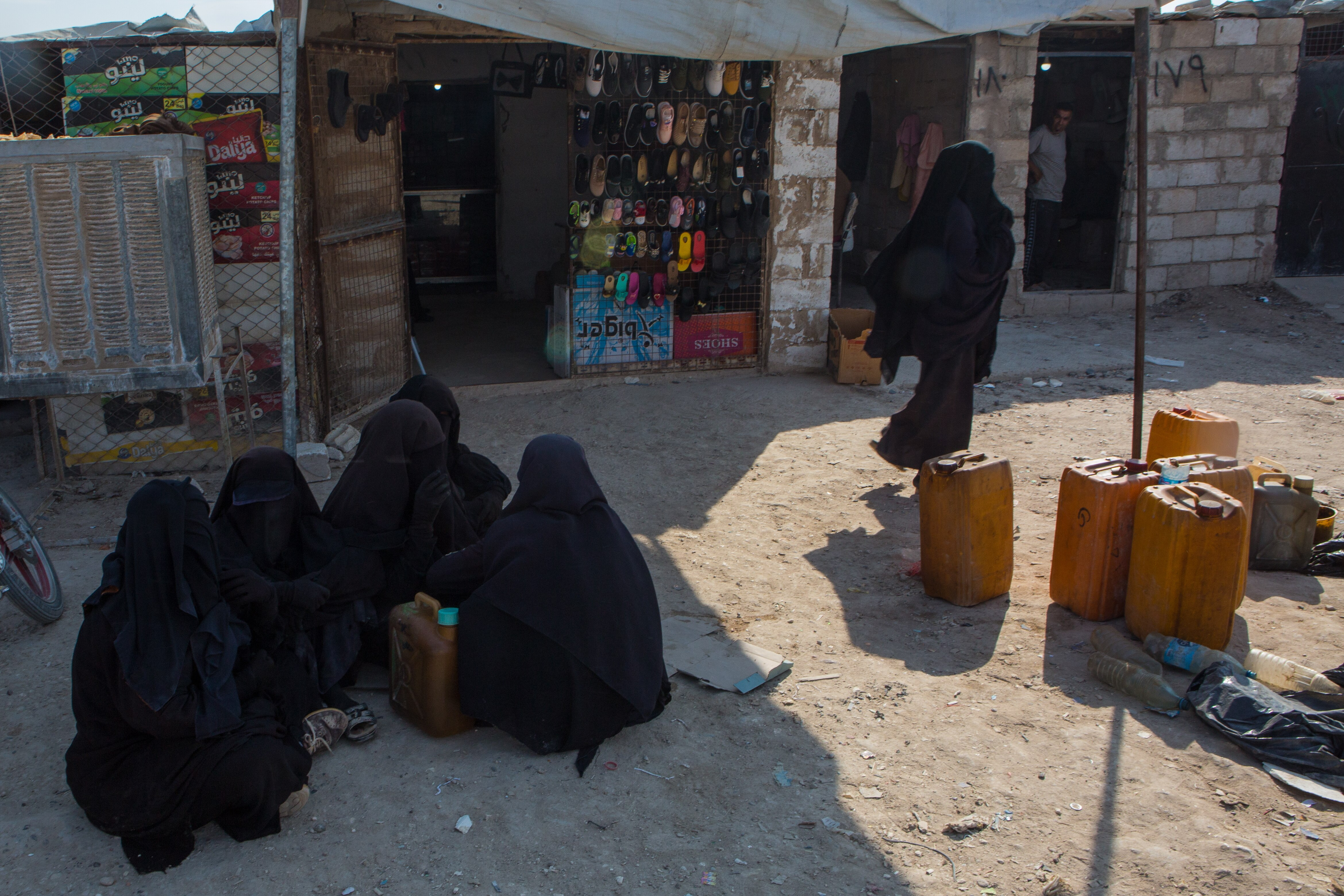
Refugees at the camp on 16 October 2019.

A report in The Washington Post from September 2019 describes the increased radicalization within the camp where conditions are dismal, security lax, and people who do not follow ISIL ideology live in fear.

On 28 November 2019, the Syrian Arab Red Crescent announced that over 36,000 of the camp's inhabitants had received aid from the organization at clinics established in the camp and via a mobile medical team there. In October 2020, in an attempt to address the situation of the overpopulation of the camp, it was announced that the authorities of the Autonomous Administration of North and East Syria (AANES) decided to release all the Syrian nationals from the camp, which account for about half of the population of the camp. There would still remain over 25,000 Iraqi and 10,000 people from other nationalities in the refugee camp.

In October 2020, SDF announced plans to free thousands of Syrians held at the Al-Hawl refugee camp. The process was slow, at the beginning of 2022 there were still around 56,500 people living in the camp.

During January and February 2021, 21 people were killed by cells of the Islamic State of Iraq and the Levant which was more than triple the number of people killed in previous months in what the Syrian Observatory for Human Rights described as the "Al-Hawl mini-state."

A 2021 Pentagon report said that much of the camp was run by Islamic State of Iraq and the Levant, who used the camp for indoctrination and recruitment purposes.

Operations at the camp were adversely affected by the 2025 suspension of US foreign aid. In September, a mass escape attempt involving 56 camp residents was thwarted by Kurdish authorities. The Pentagon's Inspector General reported that, by the end of 2025, over 23,000 people remained in the camp.

On 20 January 2026, the SDF withdrew from the prison following an offensive from the Syrian transitional government forces. A day later, the US Central Command launched a mission to transfer up to 7,000 ISIL prisoners from Al-Hasakah Governorate to a secure location in Iraq, reportedly at the request of Iraqi officials. The transitional government entered the camp that same day. On 22 January, the United Nations said it would take over administration of the camp.

The Wall Street Journal reported in February that the "vast majority" of people remaining in Al-Hawl escaped after the Syrian government took control in January. US intelligence assessed that between 15,000–20,000 escaped, while "Western diplomats in Damascus assessed that more than 20,000 people fled the camp in a matter of days earlier amid rioting and a surge of escape attempts." A diplomat said only 300–400 families remained in the camp by 15 February; the Syrian government said remaining families would be moved to another camp in northwest Syria. UNHCR's representative to Syria said Al-Hawl was "practically empty".

== Repatriation efforts ==
2021 VOA report about violence in the camp

Repatriation is difficult as many camp residents have become radicalized and pose a potential threat to their home country. Sommerville indicated that "western governments prevaricate" or may not have plans to take people back.

It was reported in September 2020 that Kurdish authorities had transferred 50 Australian nationals from al-Hawl camp to the smaller Roj camp where, it was claimed that there was more of a focus on re-education and rehabilitation. The Australian government has lacked the political will to repatriate its nationals from Syria in fear of bringing radicalized individuals into the country.

In 2023, Finland said that it was unable to repatriate remaining children that have a Finnish parent mainly due to their mothers' lack of cooperation.

In October 2025, it was reported that two Australian women and four children escaped from the camp, reached Lebanon without Australian government help, secured documents in Beirut, and flew to Victoria. Their return intensifies pressure to repatriate about 40 Australians still in Syrian camps.

== Evacuation and closure ==
Amid the 2026 northeastern Syria offensive, the United States began transferring suspected ISIL members from detention sites in Syria to Iraq. On 22 February 2026, Syrian authorities evacuated the last residents of al-Hawl camp, leading to its closure after years of housing families linked to ISIL.

== See also ==
- Al-Hawl
- Al-Roj refugee camp
- Deir ez-Zor campaign (2017–2019)
- Battle of Baghuz Fawqani
- Brides of ISIL
