= Shamima Begum =

British-born woman who joined the IS

- Born: 25 August 1999 (age 27); London, England
- Education: Mulberry Academy Shoreditch
- Spouse: Yago Riedijk (m. 2015)
- Children: 3 (all deceased)

Shamima Begum (born 25 August 1999) is a British-born woman who entered Syria to join the Islamic State in February 2015, at the age of 15. Her British citizenship was later revoked, and she was refused re-entry to the United Kingdom, with the decision upheld in the ensuing legal proceedings, Begum v Home Secretary.

While enrolled at Bethnal Green Academy, Begum and two schoolmates travelled to Syria. The journey was facilitated by an IS smuggler who was also providing information to Canadian intelligence. Ten days after her arrival, Begum married a 23-year-old IS fighter; the marriage produced three children, who all died young.

In February 2019, Begum was discovered alive at the al-Hawl refugee camp in Northern Syria by war correspondent Anthony Loyd. The following day, British Home Secretary Sajid Javid revoked her British citizenship, stating that Begum would never be allowed to return to the United Kingdom. Begum initiated legal proceedings challenging the lawfulness of this decision. British courts ruled that Javid's decision had been lawful, with the Supreme Court refusing Begum's final attempt for permission to appeal on 7 August 2024. At the present time, Begum can launch no further legal challenge within the UK legal system, but has, through her lawyers, intimated an intention to take the case to the European Court of Human Rights (ECtHR). As of 2026, she was living in al-Roj detention camp in Syria.

== Background ==
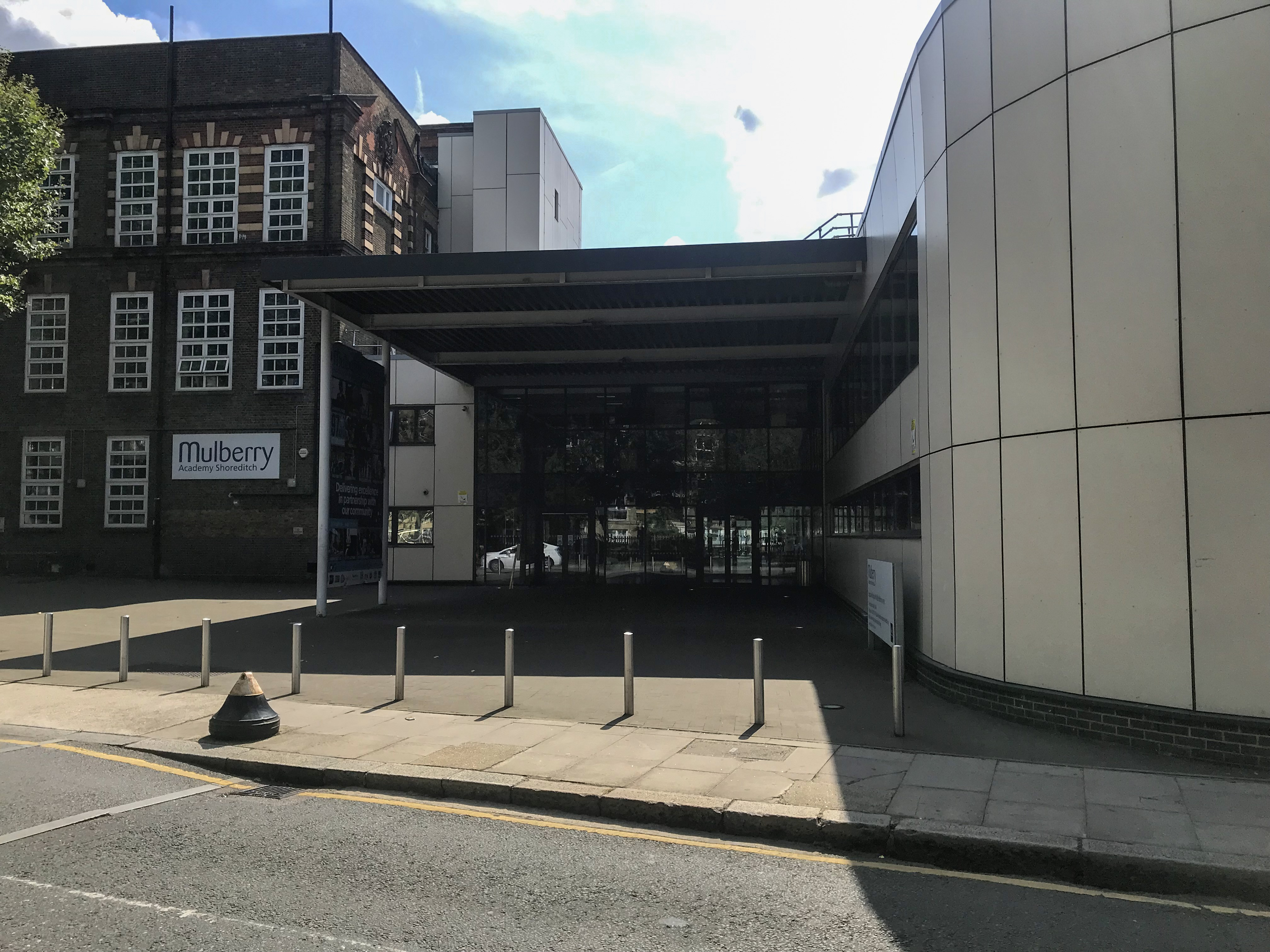
The main entrance of Mulberry Academy Shoreditch, known at the time of Begum's disappearance as Bethnal Green Academy

Shamima Begum was born on 25 August 1999 in London to Bangladeshi Muslim immigrant parents. She was raised in the Bethnal Green area of Tower Hamlets in East London, where she received her secondary education at the Bethnal Green Academy.

== Islamic State membership ==
=== Travel to Syria ===
Together with her friends Amira Abase and Kadiza Sultana, she left the UK in February 2015, at age 15. They travelled via Turkey to join ISIS in Syria.

Shortly after her departure, Begum's sister expressed hope that she and her school friends had travelled to IS territory only to bring back their friend Sharmeena Begum (no relation), who had travelled there in 2014.

Education Secretary Nicky Morgan said in February 2015 that everyone hoped and prayed for the safe return of the three girls to the UK.

=== Activities in Syria ===
Ten days after arriving in Syria, Begum married Dutch-born Yago Riedijk, a convert to Islam who had arrived in Syria in October 2014. This marriage may not be recognised under Dutch law since she was underage at that time. She gave birth to three children, all of whom died young; her youngest child was born in a refugee camp in February 2019 and, by March 2019, had died of a lung infection.

The Daily Telegraph reported that Begum had been an "enforcer" in ISIS' "morality police", and had tried to recruit other young women to join the jihadist group. The report said that she was allowed to carry a Kalashnikov rifle and earned a reputation as a strict enforcer of IS' laws, such as dress codes for women. An anti-IS activist was also reported by The Daily Telegraph as saying that there were allegations of Begum stitching suicide bombs into explosive vests so they could not be removed without detonating. None of this has been proven, and much of what has been reported is denied by Shamima Begum. Later, investigative journalist Josh Baker posed as an ISIS member and was able to speak with Sharmeena Begum, the person responsible for convincing Shamima to join the group. Sharmeena described Shamima as a "shy misfit" whose role has been greatly exaggerated in the media.

=== Role of Canadian intelligence ===
In 2022, investigative journalist Josh Baker retraced her route through Turkey and uncovered a vast ISIS people-smuggling network that facilitated Begum's travel to Syria. He also received hundreds of pages of secret files on the smuggler that revealed the man at the heart of the network, Mohammed Rashed, was conducting an intelligence operation. A serving senior intelligence officer confirmed to Baker that Rashed was a Canadian asset.

Canadian Prime Minister Justin Trudeau said, "Obviously we know we live in a particularly dangerous world, the fight against terrorism requires our intelligence services to continue to be flexible and to be creative in their approaches but every step of the way they are bound by strict rules, by principles and values that Canadians hold dear... and we expect that those rights be followed. I know there are questions about certain incidents or operations of the past and we will ensure to follow up on those."

Separately published in August 2022, Richard Kerbaj's book The Secret History of the Five Eyes claimed that Mohammed Rashed, who helped her travel to Syria, was passing information to Canadian intelligence, which became known to the Metropolitan Police after her arrival in Syria. This link was not acknowledged by British or Canadian authorities. Canadian intelligence was using Rashed for information on the Islamic State while allowing him to help people to travel to Syria to work for them. Kerbaj said that he had interviewed many Canadian intelligence officers, who confirmed the timeline of events.

== Attempted return ==
=== Media appearance ===
In February 2019, The Times' war correspondent Anthony Loyd found Begum at the al-Hawl refugee camp in Northern Syria. She was pregnant with her third child and said that she wanted to return to the UK to raise her children but did not regret her decision to join IS. Begum said she had been unfazed by seeing the head of a beheaded man as he was "an enemy of Islam", but believed that IS did not deserve victory because of their corruption and oppression.

When asked if she would be extracted from Syria, Security Minister Ben Wallace said, "I'm not putting at risk British people's lives to go and look for terrorists or former terrorists in a failed state." Three days after Loyd found her, Begum gave birth to a boy. His name was Jarrah.

Begum was interviewed by BBC correspondent Quentin Sommerville on 18 February 2019. During the interview, Begum asked for the UK's forgiveness and claimed that she still supported "some British values". She said she had been partly inspired to join IS by videos of fighters beheading hostages and also of "the good life" under the group. When asked about the Manchester Arena bombing, she said she was shocked and didn't "know about the kids", then said it was wrong to kill innocent people, but that IS considered it justified as retaliation for the coalition bombing of IS-held areas. When questioned about the rape, enslavement, and murder of Yazidi women, she claimed, "Shia do the same in Iraq".

Begum's frequent visits from journalists at al-Hawl earned the attention of female Tunisian IS camp members, who threatened her if she spoke out against IS ideology. On 1 March 2019, her lawyer confirmed that Begum had been moved to al-Roj refugee camp for her safety.

In 2021, Begum cooperated with investigative journalist Josh Baker and gave what she claims is her full account of what happened. It is investigated in the podcast The Shamima Begum Story as series 2 of I'm Not a Monster. She is also featured in a film of the same name.

=== Citizenship ===
In 2019, UK Home Secretary Sajid Javid announced that he had made an order depriving Begum of British citizenship. Under international law, the UK government could not deprive her of British citizenship if such deprivation would leave her stateless. However, the UK government contended that Begum was a dual national, also holding citizenship of Bangladesh, and was not therefore made stateless by the decision. The government of Bangladesh stated that Begum did not currently hold Bangladeshi citizenship and, without it, would not be allowed to enter Bangladesh. However, the British courts later accepted the argument that Begum was indeed a citizen of Bangladesh from birth (see below).

Under British law, Begum had the right to appeal against the Home Office's decision to revoke her UK citizenship. Javid's decision was criticised by Begum's immediate family members, but her brother-in-law, Muhammad Rahman, urged the public to support the government decision. He said, "The information they have is to the best of their ability and the British people should support it." Begum said that she might consider applying for Dutch citizenship.

In February 2019, her father, Ahmed Ali, said, "If she at least admitted she made a mistake then I would feel sorry for her and other people would feel sorry for her, but she does not accept her wrong." Begum reacted by stating that she regretted speaking to the media and said the UK is making an example out of her.

On 3 March 2019, Yago Riedijk, her husband, a member of IS, was interviewed by the BBC in a Kurdish detention centre in Syria. He said that he wished to return to the Netherlands with Begum. The Dutch government stated that they were not going to repatriate him.

It was reported in August 2022 that Begum's lawyer claims the British authorities knew that Begum was helped to travel to Syria to join the Islamic State by a Canadian intelligence agent – as claimed by Richard Kerbaj in his book The Secret History of the Five Eyes – a factor that had not been brought to the attention of the Supreme Court. Tasnime Akunjee, lawyer for the Begum family, said he had obtained a hearing in November 2022 to challenge the removal of Begum's citizenship on the basis that, as Home Secretary, Sajid Javid had failed to consider that she was a victim of human trafficking.

On 22 February 2023, it was reported that the Special Immigration Appeals Commission (SIAC) had ruled that the revocation of her citizenship was lawful.

=== Death of third child ===
On 8 March 2019, Syrian Democratic Forces announced that Begum's son Jarrah, whose imminent birth had apparently motivated her desire to return to the UK, had died in hospital the previous day. The cause of death was certified as pneumonia. The baby was buried in an unmarked grave outside al-Roj. Former Shadow Home Secretary Diane Abbott and human rights lawyer Clive Stafford Smith criticised the UK government's decision to block Begum's return to the UK.

A government spokesman said that, "The death of any child is tragic and deeply distressing for the family". Foreign Secretary Jeremy Hunt reiterated the position stated by Ben Wallace concerning risks to operatives who might be sent to recover her. He said, "Shamima knew when she made the decision to join Daesh, she was going into a country where there was no embassy, there was no consular assistance, and I'm afraid those decisions, awful though it is, they do have consequences". He said that the Foreign Office and the Department for International Development were trying to rescue IS brides and that the decisions to deprive individuals of UK citizenship were based on evidence.

=== Legal case against the British Government ===
In 2019, Begum was stripped of her UK citizenship by Sajid Javid while he was Home Secretary for the Conservative Party government.

Making citizens stateless is unlawful under the British Nationality Act 1981, section 40, and is also contrary to the United Nations Convention on the Reduction of Statelessness, of which the UK is a signatory. Begum was born a British citizen under United Kingdom law, as her father (despite having already left the UK) had indefinite leave to remain and so had the "settled in the United Kingdom" status that the British Nationality Act 1981 describes as being a satisfactory prerequisite to allow Begum to be born a British citizen. However, the Special Immigration Appeals Commission found that as a matter of the Bangladeshi nationality law, Begum also holds Bangladeshi citizenship through her parents, under section 5 of the Citizenship Act, 1951.

In April 2019, it was reported that Begum had been granted legal aid to fight the revocation of her British citizenship. Hunt described the Legal Aid Agency's decision as "very uncomfortable", but said that the UK is "a country that believes that people with limited means should have access to the resources of the state if they want to challenge the decisions the state has made about them".

In May 2019, Bangladeshi Foreign Minister Abdul Momen repeated his position on Begum and added that if she entered Bangladesh, she would face the death penalty due to the nation's "zero tolerance policy" towards terrorism.

In August 2019, the Metropolitan Police requested media organisations that had interviewed Begum—the BBC, ITN, Sky News, and The Times—to surrender any unpublished material they may hold about Begum. They sought disclosure under the Terrorism Act 2000 in order to prepare a potential prosecution against Begum.

Her lawyer, Tasnime Akunjee, travelled to Kurdish-controlled Syria to meet Begum but was turned away.

In July 2020, the Court of Appeal ruled that Begum could return to the UK to contest the government's decision to rescind her British citizenship. It was unclear how she would return to the UK to plead her case, as the British government had previously stated that it would never let her return. The Home Secretary appealed the decision to the Supreme Court of the United Kingdom; in February 2021, the court ruled in Begum v Home Secretary in favour of the Home Secretary on all grounds.

On 22 February 2023, the Special Immigration Appeals Commission rejected her appeal against the revocation of her British citizenship, which effectively prohibits her from entering the United Kingdom. Begum's lawyers said they would appeal the decision. On 23 February 2024, the Court of Appeal unanimously rejected a further appeal from her against the commission's decision.

On 7 August 2024, the Supreme Court of the United Kingdom ruled she will not be allowed to challenge the removal of her British citizenship as the grounds of her case "do not raise an arguable point of law". The ruling was unanimous. Her case has been appealed to the European Court of Human Rights.

In February 2026, filmmaker Andrew Drury, who has interviewed Begum six times, told the Daily Express that he was contacted from inside al-Roj in connection with a plot to smuggle Begum and a US-born IS bride, Hoda Muthana, out of the camp. He said Muthana contacted him and asked him for five thousand American dollars and/or British pounds, using code names for the currencies, to pay people smugglers. The plan was for the women to travel to Turkey after escaping from al-Roj; they believed if they could reach their respective embassies in Turkey, that they would be repatriated. Drury said he didn't send the women any money and instead informed the MI5 and his local MP about the escape plot. As of February 2026, Begum is one of only about 2,000 people left at al-Roj; the camp had, at its maximum, held tens of thousands of people, almost all of them women and children.

== Media coverage ==
=== Guest House for Young Widows: Among the Women of ISIS by Azadeh Moaeveni ===
Shamima Begum and her friends were among the women discussed in Azadeh Moaveni's book about women from the UK, Germany, Tunisia and Syria who joined IS, tried to or married IS-supporting men.

=== I'm Not a Monster BBC podcast series ===
Begum was the central figure in the second series of the BBC's I'm Not a Monster podcast, called "I'm Not a Monster: The Shamima Begum Story", by BBC Sounds and BBC Radio 5 Live. And a follow up second series in 2024 called "The Shamima Begum Story, Series 2: The Court Decides". The first series was about Samantha Sally, who is from the United States and also traveled to Islamic State territory with her husband and children.

=== Shamima Begum: The Blame Game ITV News podcast series ===
The 2022 series attempts to determine who was responsible for Begum’s successful trip to Syria. The Financial Times said, “What is clear from the series is that apportioning sole blame is impossible since Begum’s actions were the result of a confluence of events and failures.” Begum stated in the podcast that she befriended the Mannan family, who were from Luton, before their deaths and tried to flee Islamic State territory with them.

=== Brides film ===
Begum's journey to Syria inspired the 2025 film Brides, with the fictionalised story including the bus station in Turkey where Begum and her friends waited.

== See also ==
- United Kingdom and the Islamic State
- Brides of the Islamic State
- Hoda Muthana
- Yaser Esam Hamdi
- Yusra Hussien and Samya Dirie
- Ahmed, Salma and Zahra Halane
- Tareena Shakil
- Jack Letts
- Suhayra Aden
- Samantha Lewthwaite
- 2016–17 all-female UK terror plot
