= Bruce Mathieson =

Bruce Mathieson may refer to:

- Bruce Mathieson (businessman) (born 1943/1944), Australian businessman
- Bruce Mathieson Jnr, Australian businessman, son of billionaire Bruce Mathieson

== See also ==
- Bruce Mathison (born 1959), American football player
