= Simon Hannes =

Australian businessman

- Born: 1960
- Conviction: Insider trading

Simon Gautier Hannes (born c.1960) was an Australian senior executive of Macquarie Bank convicted of insider trading over call options bought prior to the takeover of TNT (to whom Macquarie was an advisor) by the Dutch postal service (KPN) in 1996.

The options were bought in the name of Mark Booth and cost about $90,000. After the takeover bid they were worth over $2 million. Hannes vehemently denied he was this Booth, or that he had inside information anyway. The prosecution had good indirect evidence of both, which the jury accepted at an initial trial and again at a retrial ordered on appeal.

Hannes was also convicted of offences under the Financial Transaction Reports Act 1988 (FTR) relating to the way he had split cash transactions at multiple bank branches to stay under the AUSTRAC reporting threshold of $10,000. Hannes' sentence at the trial in 1999 was 2 years and 2 months imprisonment and $110,000 in fines. He served 15½ months of an 18-month non-parole period before being granted the retrial. At the retrial in 2002 the sentence was 2 years 6 months and $100,000 in fines, with a non-parole period of 20 months, making a further 4½ months to serve.

== Inside information ==
TNT (now part of PostNL) was an Australian transport and logistics company with significant operations in Europe. It was a client of investment bank Macquarie Bank and in May 1996 TNT and their Macquarie advisors, from the Corporate Advisory Division of Macquarie Corporate Finance (MCF), had a meeting in Hong Kong with Royal PTT Nederland NV (KPN), the Dutch postal service, concerning a possible friendly takeover of TNT by KPN. Back in Sydney, the Macquarie advisors put together what they called "project Tennis", and those in this "Tennis team" were to keep the project confidential.

Hannes was an executive director of MCF, but not in the team, and so did not know directly of the proposed transaction. But he became aware something was happening, since in July 1996,

- One of his junior staff, Murdoch, was working on a valuation of TNT, which Murdoch told Hannes would be between $2.20 and $3.20 (which Hannes thought rather high).
- At a board meeting which Hannes attended, the subject of project Tennis came up, though the board was told only it concerned a major restructure of TNT.
- At a company conference in Mount Buller a slide referred to project Tennis and a possible fee of $5 to $10 million for Macquarie.

From 1 August 1996, Hannes took permanent leave from the bank, but kept keys to the MCF offices, since he would still be doing work for at least one client. Before and after taking leave, Hannes made a number of late night visits; the prosecution alleged that on those occasions he looked at the work of project Tennis.

On 2 September 1996, TNT announced it has made an agreement, with certain conditions, to sell its stake in Air New Zealand to Ansett Transport Industries. The prosecution alleged Hannes learnt from project Tennis was that KPN wasn't interested in TNT's shares in Air New Zealand, and that the prospect of a takeover would be greatly increased if TNT could sell them. It seemed that with this impediment removed Hannes took action, two days later.

== Insider trading ==
On 4 September 1996, Hannes transferred $200,000 from his Leveraged Equities account at stock broker Ord Minnett to a bank account in his name at the Commonwealth Bank (CBA).

On 5 September 1996, one "Mark Booth" rented a mailbox at Mail Boxes Etc in Mosman, subsequently used for correspondence and grandly called "Suite 140, 656 Military Road".

In the later trial, the court accepted the prosecution's allegation that this Booth was Hannes and everything done as Booth was done by Hannes. For the description below the distinction will be preserved, to show where the identification could (or could not) be made. The name "M. Booth" was apparently from Hannes' sister Mignon Booth (her married name). Hannes said in a police interview about one of the bank cheque applications "M. Booth" that it was to have been "in the name of my sister." But there was no suggestion his sister was involved in any way.

On 6 September 1996, Hannes withdrew cash of $10,000, $10,000 and $20,000 from his CBA account, each withdrawal at a different branch. All were over the AUSTRAC cash transactions reporting threshold. The first two were reported electronically, without Hannes' knowledge. At the third branch it was done manually on a form the teller asked Hannes to sign. It seemed only at that point did he learn of that rule.

That same day, "Booth" obtained a bank cheque for $9,000, paid with cash, for stock brokers Ord Minnett and deposited with them. It seemed money that had started at Ord Minnett was going back there, under a different name.

On 9 September 1996, Hannes made further cash withdrawals from his CBA account, this time $9,900, $6000, and four of $9,000, again each from a different branch. This brought the total withdrawn to $91,900.

That same day, Booth obtained nine bank cheques, paid with cash, for Ord Minnett and deposited there. Those cheques were obtained all at different bank branches, of the CBA, NAB, ANZ and Westpac. Some of those branches were just metres away from each other. There were eight cheques of $9,000 and one of $9,900. This brought the total deposited to $90,900.

On 17 September 1996, Booth phoned Ord Minnet and spoke to stockbroker Andrew Staehli. Booth identified himself as a marketing consultant from the UK staying at the InterContinental Hotel. (The hotel later gave evidence they'd had no guest of that name.)

Booth got a quote for TNT call options expiring November with a strike price of $2.00. The quote was between 1c and 2c per share, since TNT was then trading for just under $1.60 and there was only 2 months to expiry. Staehli advised this would be a risky trade and required written instructions, plus the usual options client agreement and CHESS sponsorship agreement. Booth arranged to pick up those documents in person from the Ord Minnett office.

On the morning of 18 September 1996, the completed documents were on Staehli's desk. Booth had come to the office, but Staehli never met him in person (and therefore could not subsequently identify him). The options agreement was witnessed by one "Alexi Voltraint" of 52 Railway Rd, Petersham. It later turned out there was no such person, but at number 51 was Patricia Myers whom Hannes had met at a book club meeting that month.

Booth's written instruction was to buy November $2.00 TNT call options for up to 2c each, as many as could be had (including brokerage expense) for the money on account. Staehli did this that day the 18th and then the 19th at prices of 1.5c or 2c per share, totalling about 5,000 options contracts (on 1,000 shares each).

On 19 September 1996, Booth opened a voicemail service at Voicemail National in Surry Hills. He phoned Staehli to give him that number, and Staehli advised the options had been bought and $1,500 remained in the account. It apparently annoyed Booth that not all the money had been applied.

On 2 October 1996, KPN announced its takeover bid, for $2.45 per share. This was generally regarded as rather high at the time, some commentators even suggested the Dutch had miscalculated the exchange rate or something, but the TNT business in Europe was highly desirable for them and the bid had the backing of the TNT board.

Staehli talked to Booth that afternoon, telling him he'd become a millionaire. The options were now worth roughly the difference between the strike $2.00 and the bid $2.45, an amount over $2 million. On 3 October 1996, Staehli received a letter from Booth instructing him to hold the position until 4 November 1996 in case a rival bidder made a higher offer, then sell.

== Investigation ==
Not surprisingly, this big win immediately raised suspicions at the exchange and the following day (October 3) the Australian Securities Commission (ASC) began an investigation. On 4 October 1996, the ASC got a court order freezing the account. The options were still sold per Booth's instructions, for a total $2,039,710, but that amount was held in the account.

In November 1996, Booth faxed instructions to Staehli directing the firm to pay monies under the direction of the ASC so the investors he had bought from wouldn't suffer losses. Maybe Hannes realised he was in trouble and hoped to extricate himself. In any case such payments were in fact made, with the writers of the options compensated.

The ASC investigated many people from Macquarie, TNT and KPN who might have been Booth, using good old-fashioned perseverance. They also used NetMap software developed by NetMap Analytics. NetMap was designed to look at large data sets for unusual links between people or groups in their communications or financial dealings, to identify possible wrongdoing. After a three-week run it proposed several people, of whom Hannes was one.

On 17 January 1997, a search warrant was executed at Hannes home and documents, his computer, an anorak, a black bag and glasses were seized. The anorak and bag were similar to ones in bank security tapes from when Booth obtained bank cheques.

In a voluntary police/ASC interview that day, Hannes asserted the options had been bought without his authority, by a person he did not wish to name but with whom he had formed an investment syndicate. This person was known as Mr X.

== Prosecution ==
The ASC charged Hannes,

1. Under the corporations act, for insider trading in the options purchase (as Booth).
2. Under the FTR act, for splitting the cash withdrawals (in his own name).
3. Under the FTR act, for splitting the cash used for bank cheques (as Booth).

The trial in the District Court of New South Wales was long and complex. The prosecution called 42 witnesses and 3 expert witnesses and offered 200 exhibits. Justice Backhouse's summing up took four days. The identification of Hannes as Booth relied on witnesses from the banks, Mail Boxes Etc, and handwriting analysis from documents by Booth and indentations on paper found at Hannes home. Among those indentations was a page of apparent practice signatures "M. Booth", and notes about the mailbox and voicemail.

Hannes' defence was what he said in the police/ASC investigation, namely that he had been in an investment syndicate with an English friend who was wealthy and knowledgeable about finance and invited him to invest. The friend had then made the options purchases without Hannes' authority, but also without any special knowledge about TNT. And further that when the alleged insider trading became public knowledge Hannes and the friend agreed to return the monies. Hannes also indicated that he was due to meet his English friend in London to clarify the situation, however he could not find him.

After eight days deliberation, the jury returned guilty on the FTR charges, and after further instructions from the judge and another two days they reached guilty on the insider trading charge.

Justice Backhouse handed down a sentence of 2 years 2 months imprisonment and $100,000 fine for the insider trading, and 4 months each for the FTR offences, but with those terms to all be served concurrently, and fines of $5,000 for each FTR offence in lieu of the terms being cumulative. She set a recognisance release period of 18 months.

An appeal by Hannes in the NSW Court of Criminal Appeal was upheld on the grounds of certain directions given by Justice Backhouse to the jury. The conviction was quashed and a retrial ordered. Hannes had by that time served 15½ months of his sentence and was released pending the outcome of the retrial.

The retrial in the Supreme Court of New South Wales at Darlinghurst reached the same conclusion as the first, guilty on all charges. Justice James handed down the same sentence of 2 years 2 months and $100,000 fine for insider trading, and 4 months each for the FTR offences. But he made those FTR terms cumulative on the insider trading (but concurrent with each other) for a total 2 years 6 months. He set a recognisance release period of 20 months, which accounting for time already served meant a further 4½ months in prison for Hannes.

Justice James decided for cumulative sentences on the basis that the FTR offences were a separate criminality from the insider trading, and if they were not cumulative then the sentence would be manifestly inadequate.

On 13 May 2008, Hannes won an uncommon second hearing in the High Court, to make an argument for special leave to appeal. A similar application was rejected in March 2008.
