= Outlawed terror organisations in New Zealand =

Outlawed terror organisations in New Zealand include the designation of terrorist entities as a measure the New Zealand Government has established under the Terrorism Suppression Act 2002 (TSA). The list of outlawed organisations aims to contribute to the international campaign against terrorism. The Act provides for a list of terrorist entities to be established and maintained. The New Zealand Police are responsible for coordinating any requests to the Prime Minister for designation as a terrorist entity. Implications for such designation include outlawing the financing of, participation in and recruitment to, terrorist entities. Designation under New Zealand legislation results in the freezing of any assets of terrorist entities; it is a criminal offence to participate in or support the activities of the designated terrorist entity.

== List of designated terror organisations ==
As of February 2024, the following groups (and all associated individuals or organisations) are designated as terrorist entities:

- Al-Aqsa Martyrs' Brigades
- Al-Shabaab
- The Base
- Continuity Irish Republican Army (CIRA)
- Ejercito de Liberacion Nacional
- Euskadi Ta Askatasuna
- Hamas
- Harkat-ul-Jihad-al-Islami Bangladesh
- Indian Mujahideen
- Islamic Resistance in Lebanon
- Islamic State – Sinai Province
- Izz al-Din al-Qassam Brigades (IQB)
- Jaish ul-Adl
- Jamaah Ansharut Daulah
- Kurdistan Workers' Party (PKK)
- Maute group
- New People's Army/Communist Party of the Philippines
- Palestinian Islamic Jihad
- Proud Boys
- Real Irish Republican Army (RIRA)
- Revolutionary People's Liberation Party/Front
- Shining Path

== See also ==
- Outlawed terror organisations in Australia
