= Star Entertainment Group =

Australian resort and casino company

The Star Entertainment Group Limited
- Type: Public
- Traded as: ASX: SGR
- Industry: Gambling, tourism
- Predecessor: Tabcorp
- Founded: 2011; 15 years ago
- Headquarters: De-centralised (corporate staff located across Sydney, Brisbane, Gold Coast casino sites)
- Area served: Australia
- Key people: Soo Kim (chairman); Bruce Mathieson Jnr (CEO)
- Net income: ▲A$−1,690,000,000 (FY2024)
- Number of employees: 9,000
- Divisions: The Star Grand, Brisbane; The Star, Sydney; The Star Gold Coast; Gold Coast Convention and Exhibition Centre
- Website: StarEntertainmentGroup.com.au

The Star Entertainment Group Limited is an Australian gambling and entertainment company. The company was formerly known as Echo Entertainment. Star is Australia's biggest listed casino group.

Following a money laundering scandal and 3 years of massive losses, it was seeing massive slumps in it share price with fears that it will go into voluntary administration and/or be forced to close or sell off its assets. On 3 March 2025, ASX suspended the company from trading for contravening listing rules by not lodging its half-yearly report, making the second trading halt in a week, as the company tried to find or complete a refinancing deal to ensure it could continue as a going concern. On 7 April 2025, Star Entertainment Group and Bally's Corporation reached an agreement where Bally's and potentially poker machine billionaire Bruce Mathieson through his company Investment Holdings Pty. Ltd., would acquire a 56.7% controlling stake in the company. In June 2025 the takeover was approved by Star shareholders. In November 2025, the NSW casino regulator (NICC) and Queensland regulator (OLGR) approved the transaction and thus resulted in Bally's holding around 38% and Investment Holdings Pty. Ltd. with a roughly 23% holding of Star shares..

== Properties ==
The Star Entertainment owns and operates three properties: The Star Gold Coast, The Star Grand Brisbane and The Star, Sydney. Star Entertainment holds one out of Queensland's four casino operation licenses.

The group also manages the Gold Coast Convention and Exhibition Centre on behalf of the Queensland Government. Star owned a 50% stake in the Sheraton Mirage resort on the Southport Spit, that it sold in 2023 for $192 million.

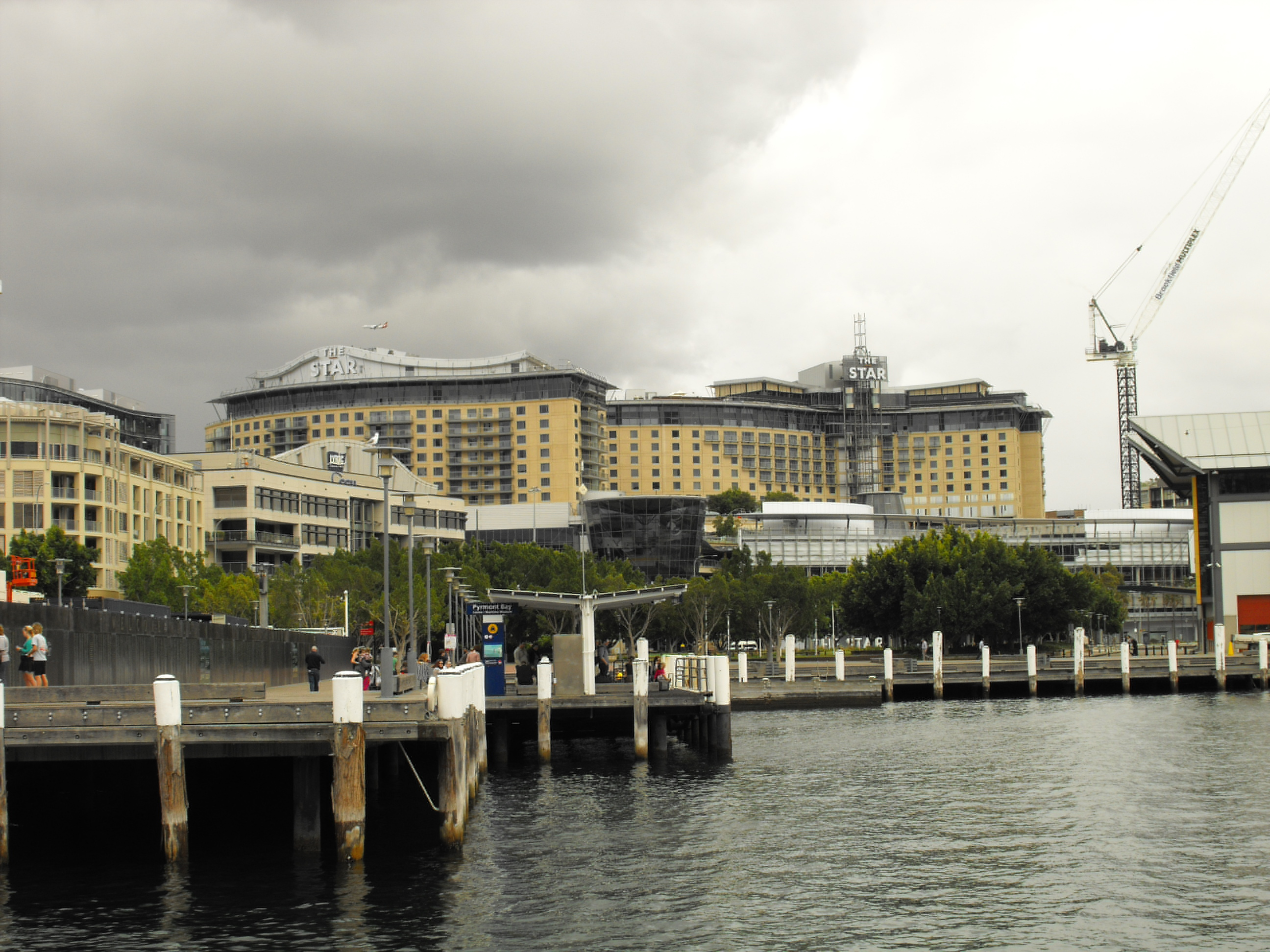
The Star, Sydney

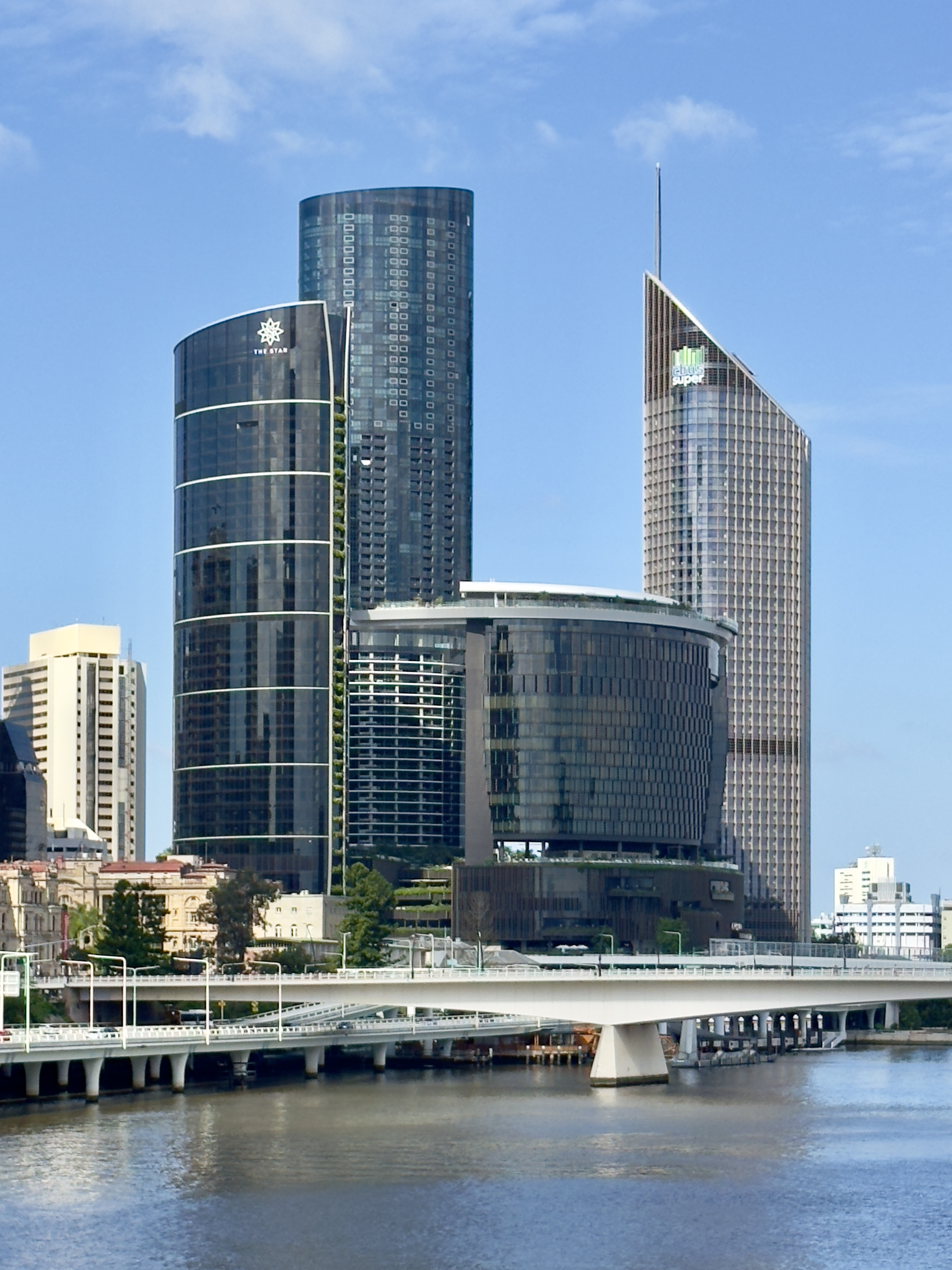
The Star Grand, Brisbane

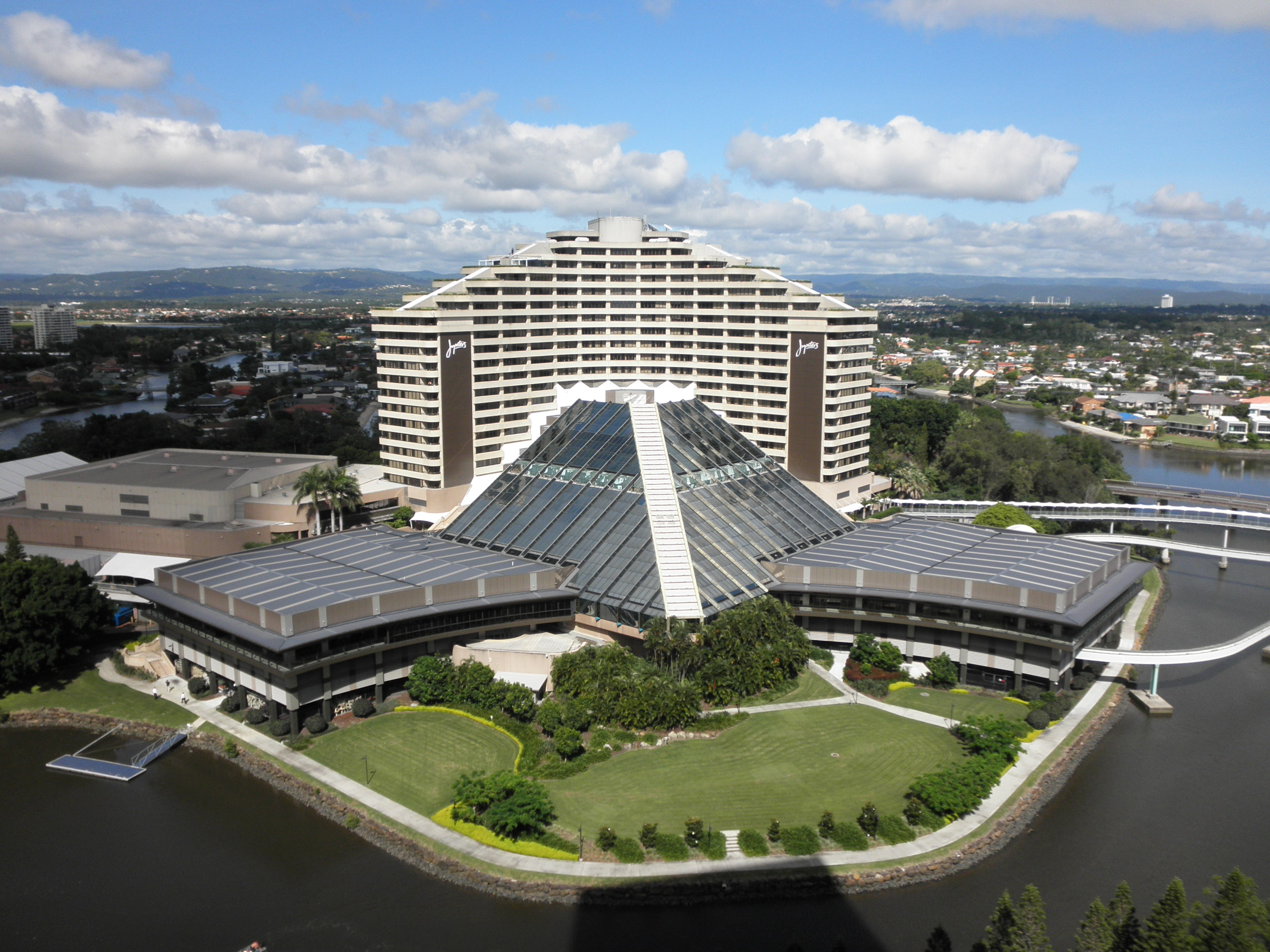
The Star, Gold Coast

In January 2026, Star announced it would be closing its Brisbane CBD corporate office as part of a cost-cutting initiative. The company re-deployed corporate staff to offices at its casino sites in Sydney, Gold Coast, and Brisbane.

=== Queen's Wharf Brisbane ===
The Queensland Government announced on 20 July 2015 that Echo Entertainment as 50% joint venture partner of the Destination Brisbane Consortium was the preferred tenderer for Queen's Wharf, Brisbane, beating rival Crown Resorts. Echo has two Hong Kong–based joint venture partners Chow Tai Fook Enterprises and Far East Consortium. The two joint venture partners will each contribute 25% of the capital to develop the integrated resort and will also jointly pay for the apartment and broader Queen's Wharf developments. Prior to the Bally’s deal, Star Entertainment was initially looking to sell its stake in the property to Chow Tai Fook Enterprises and Far East Consortium as part of a deal to keep Star Entertainment afloat. Star Entertainment eventually sold their stake in the property on 12 August 2025.

== Controversies ==
In 2021 a joint report by the Sydney Morning Herald the Age, and the television program 60 Minutes, found that Star management had been warned that its anti-money laundering controls were inadequate and that between 2014 and 2021 Star had attempted to recruit high rollers who were allegedly linked to criminal or foreign-influence activities. In response to the report Star stated that it was "concerned by a number of assertions within the media reports that it considers misleading." And also stated that it would take steps to address the allegations with Australian authorities. Following the report shareholders began forming a class action lawsuit against Star and inquiries were launched by Queensland's, Western Australia's, Victoria's, and New South Wales's state gaming regulators.

On 13 September 2022 the NSW Independent Casino Commission (NICC) published a report finding The Star unsuitable to hold its Sydney casino license because of its conduct relating to money laundering risks. It had 14 days to respond. The company was fined A$100m ($62m) as a result. Star's gambling license was suspended and operations were placed under a new manager Nicholas Weeks.

In late 2022, the Queensland Government also found Star unsuitable to hold its dual state casino licences. Former Court of Appeal Judge Robert Gotterson conducted an independent review of the matter. Queensland Attorney-General Shannon Fentiman found Star misled regulators and failed in its anti-money laundering duties. The company has been served a statement of claim for a securities class action in the Supreme Court of Victoria. The class action alleges that Star breached disclosure obligations and acted against the best interests of the shareholders. Star was fined $100 million on 9 December 2022. Casino licences for the Treasury Brisbane and the Star Gold Coast will be suspended for 90 days, with this action deferred until 1 December 2023. The deferment gives Star an opportunity to remediate its management and operations. In addition to these issues with their properties in Queensland, in New South Wales, The Star, Sydney has been under government supervision. This will remain in effect through September 2025 at the earliest.

In April 2024, the chair for The Star Star Entertainment Group Limited David Foster resigned from his post less than a week after giving evidence to the ongoing inquiry into the license suitability of the company's The Star Sydney property. Foster reportedly found his efforts increasingly frustrated by office politics and, in particular, the relationship between the company's Chief Executive Officer, Robbie Cooke, and the independent manager appointed to help implement an official state-mandated remediation plan, Nicholas Weeks. Foster's departure came after he told the official inquiry his company was currently unsuitable to operate a casino in New South Wales. There was ‘not a scenario’ in which it would be able to run the property unsupervised. He was additionally quizzed over a series of ‘heat of the moment’ texts with Cooke in which the pair allegedly discussed getting rid of Weeks by having shareholders launch a class-action lawsuit against the government-appointed manager.

As of January 2025, AUSTRAC is currently calculating a fine for breaching counterterrorism and anti-money laundering laws. The company has deposited $150 million for the fine, and it is reported that shareholder Bruce Mathieson is refusing to pour more money into the company until a fine is agreed upon.

On 10 February 2025, ASIC is proceeding to sue the former board of the company in the High Court of Australia for failing to keep track of money laundering. It already settled with and withdrew CFO Harry Theodore on misleading the National Australia Bank on its ATMs being used to funnel the money, with the penalty yet to be calculated.

In August 2026, news media reported that a fine of $2.25 million was issued to Star Casino due to a 16 year old boy gambling and drinking alcohol. It is explicitly illegal for individuals under 18 years old to drink alcohol and gamble within Australia.

== Losses ==
During the 2022-23 financial year Star lost $2.44 billion. In the 2023-24 financial year the company sustained losses of $1.69 billion. In the following years, the company has continued to struggle. There has been speculation that they could be acquired by a larger company or they could go into administration.

=== Takeover attempts & sale of assets ===
In May 2024, it was reported that multiple suitors were looking to acquire Star Entertainment and their assets. Hard Rock International was said to be weighing a bid for the struggling company, but they subsequently stated that they were not looking into acquiring Star Entertainment.

On 29 January 2025, as part of possible sales of non-core assets of the company, the company announced it would sell The Star Sydney Event Centre and unspecified spaces within the complex to Foundation Theatres in order to raise $60 million. The sale of the Star Sydney Events Centre was complete in April 2025.

On 10 February 2025 Star announced it knocked back 'several' inquiries from prospective foreign investors for Queen's Warf, citing that they undervalued the asset, but is in talks with CTFE and FEC on whether to relinquish its stake in Queen's Warf. Later in February, it was reported that Blackstone Group was mulling an acquisition of Star Entertainment Group. Blackstone already is in the global casino business and owns Australian rival Crown Resorts so it may not go through on anti-competition concerns, though reports speculate authorities' stance may be soften in this special case. The group has particular interest in the company's gambling machine assets. It is also specualated Blackstone will only intervene if the company collapses.

In order to attempt to keep Star afloat, the company attempted to sell its stake in The Star Brisbane. The company had also secured a $200 million loan. Chow Tai Fook and Far East Consortium would have assumed Star’s stake in The Star Brisbane and will also assume all debts incurred by the property. Chris Wallin was also planning to give Star Entertainment the $200 million loan which would have been intended to help keep the company solvent for the time being. On 7 March the company agreed to sell its stake in Queen’s Wharf for only $53m in installments, but the deal collapsed.

==== Acquisition by Bally’s Corporation ====
Bally's Corporation emerged as a possible bidder for the company in February 2025. It had been reported that they sent representatives to meet with Star officials in Australia. Bally’s does not run any properties outside of the US.

In March 2025, Bally's Corporation submitted a bid to rescue Star Entertainment. Ballys was offering $250 million for a 50.1% stake in the company. By April 2025, Star was looking to Ballys to rescue the company.

On 7 April 2025, Star Entertainment and Bally’s reached an agreement where Bally's will acquire a controlling 56.7% stake in the company, effectively rescuing Star Entertainment from collapse. The $180 million deal will allow Star to keep all three of their properties and will allow Bally's to expand outside of the US for the first time in the company’s history. On 25 June 2025, shareholders approved the Bally’s takeover bid.

=== 2025: Bankruptcy speculations ===
The share price saw a catastrophic 40% sell-off between 8 and 11 January 2025, becoming the worst performing business on the ASX, only selling for over a dime. This followed a release of a very bleak financial report over the previous quarter, particularly that it burned through $100 million in the quarter, and fears the company has a 50-50 chance of collapsing into voluntary administration by the end of February. Angus Hewitt, an equity analyst at Morningstar, Inc., cites weak consumer sentiment and restrictions such as mandatory carded play as significant factors. There are also fears that its portfolio will be divested or shuttered, with the Queen's Wharf, Brisbane precinct opening just the previous August, as well as that the company collapsing will wipe out investors or workers. The Queensland Government has said that it is in talks to support the South East Queensland workers should something happen, but has ruled out intervening on the actual company. Two out of three Star properties operate in Queensland.

The share price bumped up to $0.13 on 13 January after mystery speculators bought up shares of the company, amid an otherwise dismal day on the stock market after inflationary revelations.

On 17 January as part of last minute negotiations with stakeholders to prevent collapse, the company has asked the NSW and Queensland Governments for tax breaks - which they have previously denied the company - and placed itself in safe harbour, a move that protects the directors from insolvent trading whilst they grapple with refinancing the company without using an external administrator.

By February 2025, it was reported by Sky News Australia that Star Entertainment “could enter administration within a week”. The company has been unable to secure enough cash to offset it’s liquidity crisis. Ross Greenwood who is the business editor at Sky News reported “Sources close to the financially troubled Star Entertainment have revealed to us that the company could enter administration within a week as its cash reserves again run dry”. The company would need an immediate cash injection in order to remain solvent. Later that month Oaktree Capital Management offered a $650 million loan to help refinance the company's debt.

==== Trading halt ====
On 28 February 2025, Star Entertainment Group was forced into a brief trading halt "pending a further announcement", after not posting its overdue half-yearly financial results until it received "liquidity proposals [which are feasible in] determining whether the Company can continue as a going concern...and the ASX determines that the Company’s shares should be reinstated to quotation [on Monday]".

On Monday 3 March, the company was placed into a compulsory second trading halt by the ASX after not posting its half-yearly earnings in the end, putting such deals in jeopardy as a result and thousands of jobs at risk as a collapse is potentially imminent. It reportedly has spent $50 million in a month over just $75 million cash at hand in the previous report. The company is reported to be waiting for access to proceeds from its asset sales, which are currently waiting for state approval, as well as a separate "bridge loan", before it can refinance itself. If it cannot get the funds, it will be forced into administration. With the company asking for financial support from the states, the states have reiterated their hesitancy to contribute, with NSW premier Chris Minns saying they are not using their taxpayer money on casinos rather than roads, EDs and schools.

The company was at risk of entering administration in early March before securing a $200 million loan. The company was also able to sell Queen's Warf, receiving multi million dollar installments and fees to stave off administration, following conflicting reports of collapsed negotiations.

== See also ==
- Gambling in Australia
- List of integrated resorts
- List of casino hotels
