= Bruce Mathieson (businessman) =

Australian businessman

- Born: 1943 or 1944 (age 82–83); Cobden, Victoria, Australia
- Occupation: Hotelier
- Children: 3; including Bruce Mathieson, Jnr

Bruce Mathieson, born in Cobden, Victoria, is an Australian businessman, sometimes referred to as a 'billionaire pub baron'. He is known for his influence in the Australian pub, hotel, and gambling sectors.

As of 2022, Mathieson and his family collectively own 45% of all poker machines in the state of Victoria. Mathieson reportedly owns 15% of Endeavour Group, a company that owns 340 pubs as well as the Dan Murphy's and BWS liquor chains. In 2022 Mathieson retired from directing that group, and was replaced by his son, Bruce Mathieson Jnr.

== Career ==
Mathieson purchased his first hotel in the mid-1970s, and expanded his portfolio under the Bruce Mathieson Group. By year 2000 he was operating 35 venues in Victoria. In 2000 he negotiated a joint venture with Woolworths that subsequently purchased the ALH Group in 2004 for A$1.4 billion. Many of the venues owned by ALH Group operate poker machines. As a result of the venture, Woolworths and Mathieson jointly became the largest poker machine operators in Australia.

Mathieson partly owns stockbroker Ord Minnett.

In 2023 Mathieson took a 10 per cent stake in the Star Entertainment Group. His stake fell to 6.35 per cent after a September 2023 equity raise. Mathieson purchased about A$3 million of Star shares in October 2023. In February 2024, Mathieson increased his stake in Star to 8.21 per cent.

== Personal life ==
Mathieson has multiple children. His son, Bruce Mathieson, Jnr, succeeded him as director of Endeavor Group and ALH Group. He has two daughters, who own a significant number of poker machines. Due to his family members ostensibly owning the poker machines independently, their ownership does not exceed the 35% cap on state-wide poker machine ownership.

Mathieson was diagnosed with myeloma in 2023.

=== Net worth ===
In 2013, Mathieson's net worth was estimated by Forbes at over US$1.00 billion.

Year	Financial Review Rich List		Forbes Australia's 50 Richest	
Year	Rank	Net worth (A$)	Rank	Net worth (US$)
2020	63 ▲	$1.54 billion ▲		
2021	61 ▲	$1.81 billion ▲		
2022				
2023	59 ▼	$2.13 billion ▼		
2024		$1.70 billion ▼		
2025	130 ▼	$1.27 billion ▼		

Legend
Icon	Description
Steady	Has not changed from the previous year
▲	Has increased from the previous year
▼	Has decreased from the previous year

== See also ==
- ALE Property Group
