= The Star Gold Coast =

Casino and hotel in Gold Coast, Australia

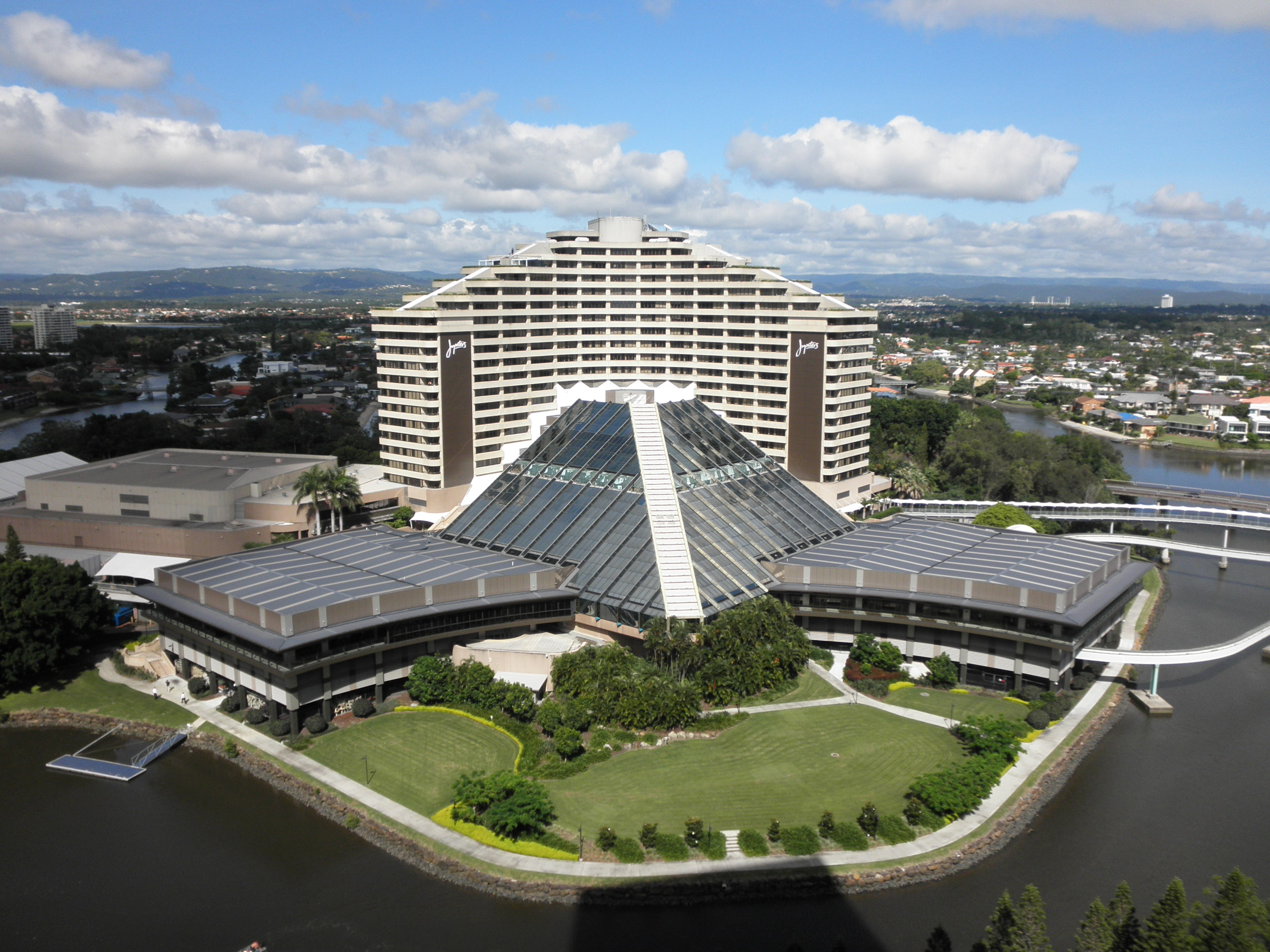
- The resort as seen in 2010 prior to recent expansions
- Interactive map of The Star Gold Coast
- Location: Gold Coast, Queensland; Broadbeach Island, Broadbeach; 28.031607°S 153.428750°E
- Opened: November 1985 (dry run); February 1986 (official)
- No. of rooms: 1,171
- Gaming space: 65,000 sq ft (6,000 m^{2})
- Signature attractions: Jupiters Theatre
- Casino type: Land-based
- Owner: Star Entertainment Group
- Previous names: Conrad Jupiters, Jupiters Hotel & Casino
- Renovated in: 2006, 2012, 2017
- Website: www.star.com.au/goldcoast

The Star Gold Coast (formerly Jupiters Hotel and Casino) is an integrated resort located in the suburb of Broadbeach on the Gold Coast in Queensland, Australia. The casino, which was Queensland's first, is situated next to the Nerang River and is operated by Star Entertainment Group. It opened in November 1985 as Conrad Jupiters. In 2017 it was rebranded as The Star, Gold Coast.

One per cent of the casino's gross gaming revenue is deposited in the Gambling Community Benefit Fund. This fund was established in 1987, supports non-profit community-based groups and is administered by the Government of Queensland.

The seven acre complex includes eight bars, seven restaurants, conference facilities, a ballroom, theatre, health spa and gym. The hotels on the property have a combined 1,171 rooms. The resort is connected to the adjacent Gold Coast Convention and Exhibition Centre. The original building stands 66 metres (216 feet) and has 21 floors. The complex is governed under the Jupiters Casino Agreement Act.

== Theatre ==
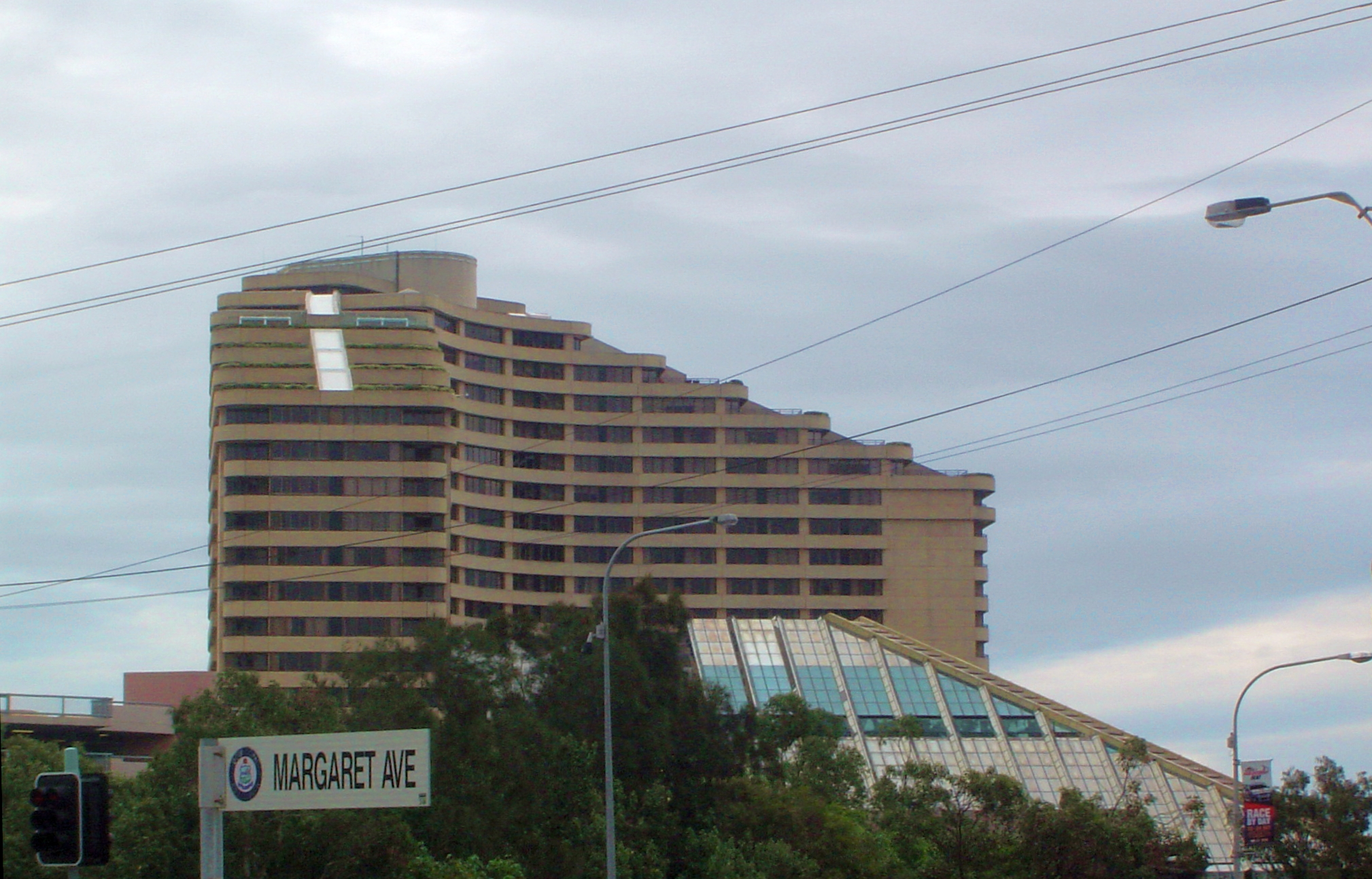
Building seen from Margaret Avenue

Jupiters Theatre underwent a $20 million makeover and expansion and re-opened in June, 2012. The redevelopment of the theatre resulted in the capacity more than doubling to accommodate 2,000 seated or 2,300 general admission guests and the theatre viewing experience will be improved through state-of-the-art technologies and architecture.

The theatre redevelopment includes the creation of a balcony level with up to 300 seats, VIP Hospitality rooms for pre- and post-event functions, new bars on the balcony and orchestra level, new toilets on the balcony and orchestra level, purpose built integrated movie projection booth, multi-purpose mechanical thrust stage, the enhancement of disability access to all areas, and increased dressing room space.

In 2008, Jupiters ceased producing shows in-house and now presents international shows such as Mother Africa, ABBA Revival, Burn The Floor, Dance of Desire, and STOMP.

== History ==
Conrad Jupiters Casino opened on 22 November 1985 with 10,000 people in attendance, properly branded as Conrad International Hotel and Jupiters Casino. The build was undertaken by Jennings Construction Services at a cost of AU$210 million. It was Australia's largest hotel at the time. Originally operated by Conrad Hotels and Jupiters Limited, the asset was included in the November 2003 merger of Jupiters with Tabcorp In April 2010 it was rebranded as Jupiters Hotel & Casino. In 2011 it became part of Echo Entertainment Group when Tabcorp listed its casino assets.

The company 'Jupiters' was named after an Australian Aboriginal man, Jupiter Mosman, who discovered a large quantity of gold in North Queensland in 1871. Conrad Hotels was named after its founder, Conrad Hilton, and owned by Hilton Worldwide.

Jupiters Hotel & Casino made headlines in 1995 when then Brisbane Broncos Rugby League player Julian O'Neill urinated on the carpet under a black jack table on two separate occasions. Both Jupiters Hotel & Casino and the Treasury Casino in Brisbane were used for money laundering by welfare recipients on behalf of organised crime syndicates, from May 2006 to November 2007.

Between 1993 and 2001, the casino was defrauded of $5.7 million when corrupt casino staff and food suppliers fabricated food orders and invoices. In 2009, a court heard that senior management tried to prevent a proper investigation and that the police major fraud squad became involved in 2003.

In 2008, security staff at the casino and other venues took part in a trial of head mounted cameras which were worn over the ear. The devices were used to record video and audio evidence of incidents and raised privacy concerns due to a lack of laws regarding their use. In 2009, Office of Gaming acting executive director Barry Grimes criticised the casino's internal controls and procedures relating to excluded persons gaining entry to the casino.

=== Renovations and expansions ===
The complex underwent renovations in 2006. $53 million was spent on refurbishment of the casino. The two gaming floors are now one and the size is just over double of what it was. Level Two became the brand new Gold Club room. A new restaurant, balconies, and two new bars were included in the renovation. By 2008, 442 of the hotel rooms were completely refurbished at the cost of $16 million. The hotel front office and lobby bar were also renovated.

In August 2015, work commenced on a $345 million redevelopment of the casino including the construction of a 17-storey tower.

In recent years, the property has been expanded to include new hotels which are part of The Star Gold Coast. The Star Grand still has the most hotel rooms of the property, with 592 guest rooms. An all-suite hotel, The Darling added a new building with 56 luxury suites. The opening of the Dorsett hotel added 313 new guest rooms.

By 2025, the Epsilon will be complete and will open the same year. The 63 storey building will include 210 hotel rooms as well as 457 residential apartments.

== See also ==
- Tourism on the Gold Coast
- List of integrated resorts
