= Control order =

A control order is an order made by the Home Secretary of the United Kingdom to restrict an individual's liberty for the purpose of "protecting members of the public from a risk of terrorism". Its definition and power were provided by Parliament in the Prevention of Terrorism Act 2005. Control orders were also included in the Australian Anti-Terrorism Act 2005.

The control orders section of the Prevention of Terrorism Act provides for extremely limited rights of appeal and the absence of double jeopardy restrictions (i.e. if a recipient managed to win an appeal in the Court of Appeal or other tribunal, the Home Office could simply re-apply the same order again). This has led to many court rulings highly critical of the orders.

The Prevention of Terrorism Act and control orders were repealed in December 2011 by the Terrorism Prevention and Investigation Measures Act 2011.

== Powers ==
The list of possible restrictions and obligations that can be included in a control order is long. It can place restrictions on what the person can use or possess, their place of work, place of residence, whom they speak to, and where they can travel. Furthermore, the person can be ordered to surrender their passport, let the police visit their home at any time, report to officials at a specific time and place, and allow themselves to be electronically tagged so their movements can be tracked.

In short, it provides for a graduated scale of technological "prisons without bars" that are intended to work within the European Convention on Human Rights.

When the control order crosses the line and "deprives liberty", rather than "restricts liberty", it is called a derogating control order because it infringes Article 5 of the ECHR. This can only happen if there is a derogation according to Article 15, and the Home Secretary must apply to a court for the authority. Derogation is only allowed when there is a "war or other public emergency threatening the life of the nation". Part 76 of the Civil Procedure Rules 1998 regulates the process of applying for a derogating control order.

The ECHR states that the government cannot deprive any person of their liberty without due process of law. This process must include informing the person of the accusation against him, giving him access to legal assistance to prepare his defence, and giving him the right to have his case heard and decided in public before a competent court.

The government has claimed that the terrorist allegations against certain individuals are of such a nature and from such sources that they cannot be prosecuted "because that would mean revealing sensitive and dangerous intelligence".

=== List of restrictions ===
- Possession and/or use of specified objects and substances.
- Use of specified services and/or facilities.
- Certain occupations and employment.
- Carrying out specified activities.
- Restriction on association and communications with specified people, or people in general.
- Restriction of place of residence, and visitors to the residence.
- Movements at certain times of the day, or to certain places.
- Passport must be surrendered.
- A requirement to admit specified persons to certain premises.
- A requirement to allow specified persons to confiscate and/or scientifically examine any object on premises owned by the subject.
- A requirement to allow electronic surveillance to be carried out and photographs taken.
- Any other restrictions whatsoever for up to 24hrs, when it is deemed necessary.

== History ==
The power to make control orders was voted through Parliament on the evening of 11 March 2005 after a famously long session of Parliamentary ping-pong. The ten detainees being held under Part 4 of the Anti-terrorism, Crime and Security Act 2001 were released from Belmarsh and were immediately subject to control orders.

On March 24, 2005, one of the men, Abu Rideh, gave a newspaper interview where he denied having any connection with terrorism, and was able to outline the contents of his order.

- He is not allowed to make arrangements to meet anybody, but he can meet them if he does so unannounced
- He cannot attend any prearranged meetings or gatherings, but was present at the anti-war demonstration at Hyde Park the previous Saturday. He says he stumbled across it while playing football in the park with his children
- He is banned from having visitors to his home unless they are vetted in advance, but he is allowed to arrange to attend group prayers at a mosque

On April 16, 2005, it was reported that all 10 control orders had been printed with the same reason, connecting individuals with the Wood Green "ricin plot". This was blamed on a "clerical error".

On 23 May 2011, following a Government Review of Counter-Terrorism and Security Measures published in January 2011, the Home Office announced the scheme intended to replace the control orders: Terrorism Prevention and Investigation Measures (TPIM). Although intended to be more flexible and to focus more on the investigation of the individual suspected of terrorism-related activity with increased judicial oversight, they have been dubbed as mere re-brandings of control orders.

== Timeline of ministerial statements and legal challenges ==
Section 14 requires the Home Secretary to make a statement to Parliament every three months reporting about their exercise of the control order powers.

- 11 March 2005 - The act came into force and 11 orders were in place, all against former Belmarsh prisoners who had been held under the previous Anti-terrorism regime.
- 16 June 2005 - Nothing had changed, except that 3 of the orders were varied to take account of change of address.
- 10 October 2005 - 9 orders had been revoked, one new one in made against a British national. Therefore, there were 3 in operation.
- 12 December 2005 - 5 new orders made, making the total 8.
- 15 February 2006 - both the House of Commons and the House of Lords agreed to renew the legislation on the terms of the sunset clause.
- 13 March 2006 - 11 control orders were in place, 3 of which were on British nationals.
- 12 April 2006 - A court ruled that the review procedure for the control orders was not compatible with Article 6 of ECHR (Right to a fair hearing), however the then Home Secretary Charles Clarke was undeterred in his stance on Control Orders.
- 12 June 2006 - 14 control orders in force, 5 on British nationals.
- 29 June 2006 - a High Court judge nullified six of these orders as being incompatible with the ECHR, saying: "I am left in no doubt whatsoever that the cumulative effect of the order has been to deprive the respondents of their liberty, in breach of article 5. I do not consider that this is a borderline case."
- 11 September 2006 - 9 new orders were made; 2 were against British citizens on 19 June and 5 September, the rest against foreign nationals, one on 31 July and the other 6 on 1 August. There were now 15 orders in force, 6 of which are against British citizens.
- 16 October 2006 - the Home Office revealed that two men who are subject to control orders had absconded and were on the run. One suspect had escaped some months previously and the second had gone missing in the last two weeks, but authorities had kept these security breaches out of the public domain until this date.
- 17 November 2006 - Lord Carlile made his first annual review of control orders and recommended that more information be included in the ministerial statements.
- 11 December 2006 - 16 control orders were in force, 7 on British nationals.
- 31 October 2007 - Supreme Court of the United Kingdom rules on three cases involving control orders. They ruled that 18-hour curfews are a deprivation of liberty but that 12- and 14- hour curfews are acceptable.
- 11 September 2007 - 9 new orders were made; 2 were against British citizens on 19 June and 5 September - 14 control orders in force, 8 in respect of British citizens. There were 3 absconders.
- 21 February 2008 - Parliament renewed the Act for another year
- 3 March 2009 - Parliament approved again for another year.
- 10 June 2009 - In the case of Secretary of State for the Home Department v AF and another (2009) UKHL 28, the House of Lords rules 9-0 that sufficient detail of the allegations must be disclosed to suspects to enable them to give effective instructions to the special advocates representing them.

== See also ==
- Security Certificate of Canada
- Anti-Terrorism Act 2005 (Australia)
