= Australian Transaction Reports and Analysis Centre =

Australian government agency

Agency overview
- Formed: 1989
- Headquarters: Level 2, 4 National Circuit, Barton, Australian Capital Territory
- Employees: 312 (2017–2018)
- Minister responsible: Tony Burke, Minister for Home Affairs
- Agency executive: Mr Brendan Thomas, Chief Executive Officer
- Website: austrac.gov.au

Australian Transaction Reports and Analysis Centre (AUSTRAC) is an Australian government financial intelligence agency responsible for collecting and analysing financial transaction reports to identify suspected money laundering, organised crime, tax evasion, welfare fraud and terrorism financing. AUSTRAC was established in 1989 under the Financial Transaction Reports Act 1988. It implements in Australia the recommendations of the Financial Action Task Force on Money Laundering (FATF), which Australia joined in 1990.

AUSTRAC's existence was continued under the Anti-Money Laundering and Counter-Terrorism Financing Act 2006 (Cth) (AML/CTF Act). The AML/CTF Act came into effect on 12 December 2006, and extended the existing monitoring regime to cover terrorism financing and designated terrorist organisations. Under Division 103 of the Criminal Code Act 1995 (Cth), it is illegal to finance terrorism. The list of designated terror organisation is maintained by the Attorney-General's Department. In 2014 AUSTRAC released a report, Terrorism financing in Australia 2014, which says, "Terrorism financing poses a serious threat to Australians and Australian interests at home and abroad."

AUSTRAC is a member of the Egmont Group of Financial Intelligence Units and an observer in the Camden Assets Recovery Interagency Network (CARIN) and is a member of FATF and the Global Forum on Transparency and Exchange of Information for Tax Purposes. It is also a member of the Asset Recovery Interagency Network Asia Pacific.

Certain classes of financial services are required to be reported to AUSTRAC, in particular bank cash transactions (i.e., notes and coins) of A$10,000 or more, as well as suspicious transactions and all international transfers. The reporting requirements extend to digital currency transactions. Reports to AUSTRAC must be made within 10 business days. The information that AUSTRAC collects is available for use by law enforcement, revenue, regulatory, security and other agencies.

== Operation ==
The transactions that "reporting entities" are required to report to AUSTRAC include:

- cash transactions of A$10,000 or more, or foreign currency of that value,
- international funds transfer instructions, either into or out of Australia, of any amount, and
- suspicious transactions of any kind, being transactions the dealer may reasonably suspect of being part of tax evasion or crime, or might assist in a prosecution.

Australia's cash controls require travellers to report to AUSTRAC when they carry $10,000 or more (or equivalent in a foreign currency) of cash (or equivalent) into or out of Australia, which can be done on forms available from the Border Force at airports and sea ports. The Border Force attempts to detect evasion of this requirement. Airlines are not liable for what their passengers carry. Cross-border movement of bearer negotiable instruments of any amount must also be reported if requested by a Border Force or police officer.

Digital currency exchanges are required to monitor transactions and report any suspicious activity or transactions over $10,000.

It's an offence under the Act for anyone to split a transaction into two or more parts if the dominant purpose is to avoid reporting rules and thresholds.

Certain classes of transactions are exempt, or may be exempted on application. For example, established customers transacting amounts typical of their lawful business, such as payroll transactions and retail or vending machine takings. Motor vehicle traders are specifically not eligible for exemption, as are boats, farm machinery and aircraft traders.

Under the Freedom of Information Act 1982, any person can access records held by AUSTRAC, subject to certain exemptions.

== Reporting entities ==
Entities which are required to report transactions to AUSTRAC are called "reporting entities", which are specified in the AML/CTF Act. These entities deal in cash, bullion, cryptocurrencies and financial transactions, and include:

- banks and similar financial institutions, such as building societies
- corporations
- insurance companies and intermediaries
- securities dealers, such as stock brokers
- unit trust managers and trustees (but cash management trusts transacting only by cheque or similar are exempt)
- traveler's cheque or money order issuers
- cash carriers and payroll preparation businesses
- casinos
- bookmakers, including totalisator agencies
- bullion dealers
- solicitors, acting on their own behalf (e.g., their trust fund, or originated mortgages)
- digital currency exchange providers.

== Identification ==
Reporting entities must identify their customers using the 100-point check system. Accounts may be opened without identification, but can only be operated (i.e., withdrawals made) by an identified customer, and an unidentified customer is blocked from making withdrawals. Generally, identification can be transferred from one account to another, so that for instance a person once identified does not need to produce documents again when opening a second account at the same institution.

For banks and similar reporting entities, identification requirements are determined by a risk-based approach, which may differ for each reporting entity.

It's an offence to open or operate an account with a reporting entity under an alias or false name, punishable by a fine or up to 2 years imprisonment.

== Other agencies ==
The information that AUSTRAC collects is also available to a large number of government agencies, including:

- Australian Taxation Office (ATO)
- State and territory revenue offices
- Services Australia
- Australian Federal Police (AFP), and which may then communicate information to foreign law enforcement agencies, with appropriate undertakings
- State and territory police services
- Australian Security Intelligence Organisation (ASIO)
- Australian Border Force
- Australian Criminal Intelligence Commission
- Australian Securities and Investments Commission (ASIC)
- Department of Home Affairs, Australia
- State commissions and royal commissions against corruption –
  - Crime and Corruption Commission, Queensland
  - Corruption and Crime Commission, Western Australia (added in 2004)
  - Independent Commission Against Corruption, New South Wales
  - New South Wales Crime Commission
  - Law Enforcement Conduct Commission, New South Wales
- Foreign countries, with appropriate undertakings.

== Breaches ==
One prominent attempted evasion of the AUSTRAC rules took place ahead of the Dutch takeover of TNT (see TNT N.V.) in 1999. Simon Hannes was an executive at Macquarie Bank, which was advising TNT, and he bought about $90,000 of TNT call options under the name "Mark Booth" to profit when the bid was announced. He was convicted of insider trading but also of two offences under the Financial Transactions Reports Act since he had made multiple cash withdrawals and deposits each just under the $10,000 threshold, apparently to avoid that reporting. His sentence for those transactions was 4 months jail.

In March 2017, AUSTRAC fined Tabcorp Holdings Limited $45 million for breaches of anti-money laundering and counter-terrorism financing laws. Tabcorp were found to have failed to make reports of suspicious behaviour on 108 occasions over more than five years. In the agreed facts put forward to the Federal Court by AUSTRAC and Tabcorp, Tabcorp directors were not made aware of any significant deficiencies in the company's AML/CTF program, until such matters were raised directly with Tabcorp by AUSTRAC, in 2014.

On 3 August 2017, AUSTRAC took action against the Commonwealth Bank alleging that it did not report cash transactions over $10,000 within the required 10 business day period, or at all. The alleged breaches involved over 53,700 transactions over $10,000 through a type of ATM that allowed anonymous cash deposits up to $20,000. In June 2018, the Commonwealth Bank agreed to pay a $700 million fine to settle the action, with CBA admitting to a host of breaches, including that millions of dollars were laundered through its ATMs by criminals including drug and firearms importers and that CBA failed to properly file more than 53,000 reports to Austrac over cash deposits of more than $10,000 in its ATMs. CBA also admitted that 149 “suspicious matter reports” were filed late, or not at all.

In November 2019, AUSTRAC took action against Westpac alleging "systemic non-compliance" with AML/CTF 23 million times and covering $11 billion of transactions, involving the failure to properly vet thousands of transactions that could be linked to child exploitation and live child sex shows in the Philippines and other parts of south-east Asia.

A Crown Resorts executive authorised the transfer of $500,000 to a drug trafficker and nightclub operator in January 2017, which was not reported to AUSTRAC for a year.

== See also ==
- List of Australian Commonwealth Government entities
- Terrorism financing
- Terrorism in Australia
