= Bruce Mathieson Jnr =

Australian businessperson

Bruce Mathieson Jnr is an Australian businessman and scion of billionaire Bruce Mathieson Snr.

He is currently the chief executive officer of Star Entertainment Group, a role he commenced shortly after the Mathieson family partners with Bally's Corporation, to gain control of the Australian casino group.

Mathieson Jnr is also a director of the Bruce Mathieson Group, the hospitality empire built by Bruce Mathieson, and a non-executive director of stock broking firm, Ord Minnett.

Mathieson Jnr and his family collectively own 45% of all pokies in the state of Victoria.

== Career ==
In 2011 he was serving as Woolworths' ALH Group's chief executive. His tenure at the company coincided with a scandals of high volume pokie machine players being targeted by venue staff.

In 2021 he stepped down from his role as managing director of hotels at Endeavor Group. He later returned to the company after being appointed to replace his father as director of both Endeavor and ALH Group, however amid tensions between the Mathieson Family and Endeavour Group management, he again stepped down from the role in 2024, however Mathieson Jnr's family still owns 15 per cent of Endeavour.

He frequently worked together with his father while his father was actively involved with the industry.

Mathieson Jnr continues to be actively involved in The Australian hospitality and gaming industry following his father's retirement.

== Personal life ==
Bruce Mathieson Junior is one of three adult siblings born to Bruce Mathieson Snr and his wife Jill Mathieson.

In 2020, Mathieson Jnr purchased the most expensive home sold that year on the Gold Coast.

== See also ==
- Woolworths Group
