= Australian anti-terrorism legislation, 2004 =

Counter-terrorism Acts of the Parliament of Australia in 2004

Three anti-terrorism bills were enacted in the Australian Parliament in 2004 by the Howard Coalition government with the support of the Labor Opposition. These were the Anti-terrorism Bill 2004, the Anti-terrorism Bill (No 2) 2004 and the Anti-terrorism Bill (No 3) 2004.

== Anti-terrorism Bill 2004 ==
The Attorney-General, Philip Ruddock, introduced the Anti-terrorism Bill 2004 on 31 March 2004. He described it as "a bill to strengthen Australia's counter-terrorism laws in a number of respects – a task made more urgent following the recent tragic terrorist bombings in Spain." He said that Australia's counter-terrorism laws "require review and, where necessary, updating if we are to have a legal framework capable of safeguarding all Australians from the scourge of terrorism."

The main provisions of the Bill were:

- to extend the fixed investigation period (that is, the period for which a suspect can be questioned before being either charged or released) under Part 1C of the Crimes Act for investigations into suspected terrorism offences, from 4 to 24 hours. Any such extension would have to be authorised by a magistrate or other judicial officer.
- to permit law enforcement agencies to reasonably suspend or delay questioning of a person suspected of committing a terrorism offence to make overseas inquiries to obtain information relevant to that terrorism investigation.

Ruddock said that the government recognised the need to "ensure that appropriate safeguards are put in place to maintain the balance between security and individual rights and freedom." Existing safeguards in part 1C of the Crimes Act continue to apply to terrorist suspects being investigated in accordance with the Crimes Act regime. These safeguards include:

- a suspect's right to communicate with a legal practitioner, friend or relative, an interpreter or a consular office
- a suspect's right to remain silent
- requiring the tape recording of any admissions or confessions made by a suspect as a pre-condition for admissible evidence, and
- a suspect's right to a copy of recorded interviews.

The Bill amended a number of Acts:

- the Crimes (Foreign Incursions and Recruitment) Act to make it an offence for a person to commit hostile activities while serving in any capacity in or with the armed forces of a foreign state.
- the Criminal Code to make it an offence for a person to be a member of an organisation found by a court to be a terrorist organisation, and gave the government the power to prescribe organisations for the purposes of the Act. A further amendment to section 102.5 of the Criminal Code introduced new offences of providing training to or receiving training from a terrorist organisation.
- the Proceeds of Crime Act to extend the operation of the Act to foreign indictable offences beyond proceeds derived in Australia, to also cover proceeds that have been derived elsewhere and then subsequently transferred to Australia. The Bill defined "foreign indictable offence" to include an offence triable by a military commission of the United States under a specified military order.

The Bill was referred to the Senate Legal and Constitutional Committee, which recommended some amendments to strengthen safeguards in the Bill. The Labor Opposition then indicated that it would support the Bill if it were amended in accordance with the committee's recommendations. The Bill was passed by the House of Representatives without opposition on 13 May. In the Senate the government accepted most, but not all, of the committee's amendments. The Australian Democrats, the Australian Greens and independent Senator Meg Lees opposed the Bill in the Senate. The Bill was passed by the Senate with the support of the Opposition on 24 June, was assented on 30 June and came into force on 1 July 2014 as the Anti-terrorism Act 2004.

== Anti-terrorism Bill (No 2) 2004 ==
Ruddock introduced the Anti-terrorism Bill (No 2) 2004 on 17 June, to amend a number of pieces of legislation to bring them into conformity with the Anti-Terrorism Act described above. "Under the new offence," Ruddock said, "what must be proved is that the person communicates or meets directors, members or promoters of a listed terrorist organisation and in doing so provides support intended to assist the expansion or continued existence of the organisation."

The Bill amended a number of Acts:

- the Criminal Code under the Crimes Act was amended to make it an offence to "intentionally associate with a person who is a member or who promotes or directs the activities of a listed terrorist organisation where that association provides support that would help the terrorist organisation to continue to exist or to expand."
- the forensic procedure laws in part 1D of the Crimes Act was amended to ensure that if a terrorist attack or other mass-casualty disaster were to occur within Australia forensic services from all jurisdictions in Australia would be able to work together, using the national DNA database system, to identify the victims of the disaster and conduct a criminal investigation.
- the Passports Act was amended to give Australian authorities, such as the Australian Federal Police or the Australian Security Intelligence Organisation (ASIO), the power to request an order for the surrender of a person's foreign passport.
- the Australian Security Intelligence Organisation Act was amended to give ASIO the power to demand a person surrender their Australian and foreign passports if the person is subject to a request for consent to apply for a questioning warrant.
- the Administrative Decisions (Judicial Review) Act 1977 was amended to make decisions of the Attorney-General on security grounds exempt from the application of the Act.

The Bill passed Parliament and was assented to on 16 August 2004 as the Anti-terrorism Act (No. 2) 2004.

== Anti-terrorism Bill (No 3) 2004 ==
Ruddock introduced the Anti-terrorism Bill (No 3) 2004 on 24 June which reintroduced the provisions of the Anti-terrorism Bill (No 2), 2004, relating to the amendment of Part 1D of the Crimes Act, the Passports Act and Australian Security Intelligence Organisation Act (described above), which had been separated from that Bill at the request of the Opposition to allow a speedy passage of these non-controversial sections of the Bill.

The Bill was supported by the Opposition and was passed by the House of Representatives on 24 June without opposition. The Bill was then referred to the Senate Legal and Constitutional Committee and was debated in the Senate after the Committee reported. The Bill passed Parliament and was assented to on 16 August 2004 as the Anti-terrorism Act (No. 3) 2004.

== Criticisms of the legislation ==
The Australian Democrats and the Australian Greens opposed the bills on the grounds that they unacceptably abridged the rights of persons and organisations. Some civil liberties organisations also opposed all or parts of the bills. The Castan Centre for Human Rights Law at Monash University said: "No evidence is offered to support this claim that the investigation of terrorist offences is sufficiently complex as to warrant a doubling of the total permitted time of detention from 12 to 24 hours. Indeed, given the breadth of the definition of 'terrorism offences', it is difficult to see how such evidence could be produced. The potential subject matters of investigation are simply too varied."

The New South Wales Council for Civil Liberties said: "The Council is in general concerned about any extension of the power to detain people as proposed by this bill." The Civil Rights Network said: "We are concerned that this proposal does not seem to have arisen from any real, practical difficulty which has been experienced. Further, there has been a complete absence of debate as to the reasons for and necessity of this amendment. When changes to Australia's legal system which have the potential to severely impact on individual's liberty and rights are proposed it is fundamentally important that the community is properly consulted and informed before our elected representatives act."

The Law Council of Australia also expressed concerns about some aspects of the bills. "The Law Council is not convinced of the need for this legislation," the council's submission to the Senate inquiry said. "Indeed in our submission the new laws have the potential to operate harshly and will unfairly target members of minority groups, especially those of the Islamic faith."

== See also ==
- Australian Anti-Terrorism Act 2005
- Outlawed terror organisations in Australia
- Terrorism in Australia#Anti-terrorism legislation
