= Australian sedition law =

Criminal law of Australia

Australian sedition law was an area of the criminal law of Australia relating to the crime of sedition.

Effectively defunct for nearly half a century, these laws returned to public notice in 2005 when changes were included in an Anti-terrorism Bill announced by Prime Minister Howard prior to a "counter-terrorism summit" of the Council of Australian Governments on 27 September.

The Bill was introduced on 3 November and passed into law on 6 December 2005 after government amendments adding some protection for the reporting of news and matters of public interest were introduced in response to community pressure.

== History ==
Early prosecutions for sedition in Australia include:

- the conviction of Henry Seekamp for seditious libel over the Eureka Rebellion in 1854;
- the conviction of 13 trade union leaders of the 1891 Australian shearers' strike for sedition and conspiracy; and
- the action against radical Harry Holland, jailed for two years in 1909 over his advocacy of violent revolution during the Broken Hill miners' strike.

During the First World War Sedition laws were used against those who opposed conscription and war, in particular the Industrial Workers of the World (IWW) in Australia. In 1916 members of the IWW in Perth were charged with sedition including 83-year-old Montague Miller, known as the grand old man of the labour movement. Miller was released after serving a few weeks of his sentence but was re-arrested in 1917 in Sydney at the age of 84 and sentenced to six months jail with hard labour at Long Bay Gaol on the charge of belonging to an unlawful association. The Sydney Twelve were all charged and convicted with various offences including sedition.

Lance Sharkey, then General-Secretary of the Communist Party of Australia, was charged that, in March 1949 he:

uttered the following seditious words: "If Soviet Forces in pursuit of aggressors entered Australia, Australian workers would welcome them. Australian workers would welcome Soviet Forces".

The last prosecution was in 1960, when Department of Native Affairs officer Brian Cooper was prosecuted for urging "the natives" of Papua New Guinea to demand independence from Australia. He was convicted, and committed suicide four years later, after losing his appeal.

=== Recent cases ===
The Australian government in 2006 investigated Islamist books found in Lakemba and Auburn in Sydney promoting suicide bombings, anti-Australian conspiracies and racism, but the Australian Federal Police found in 2006 they did not breach Commonwealth Criminal Code or NSW Crimes Acts 1900.

== Previous Law ==
Colonial legislation, for example the Queensland Criminal Code (1899), first established sedition in Australian law.

The Federal offence of sedition was created in the Federal Crimes Act (1914).

=== Seditious Intention ===
Section 24 defined a seditious intention as [a]n intention to effect any of the following purposes:

(a) to bring the Sovereign into hatred or contempt;
(d) to excite disaffection against the Government or Constitution of the Commonwealth or against either House of the Parliament of the Commonwealth;
(f) to excite Her Majesty's subjects to attempt to procure the alteration, otherwise than by lawful means, of any matter in the Commonwealth established by law of the Commonwealth; or
(g) to promote feelings of ill-will and hostility between different classes of Her Majesty's subjects so as to endanger the peace, order or good government of the Commonwealth;

=== Seditious Enterprises ===
Section 24B defined a seditious enterprise as an enterprise undertaken in order to carry out a seditious intention, and Section 24C specified that [a] person who engages in a seditious enterprise with the intention of causing violence, or creating public disorder or a public disturbance, is guilty of an indictable offence punishable on conviction by imprisonment for not longer than 3 years, although Section 24D(2) provided that [a] person cannot be convicted of any of the offences defined in section 24C or this section upon the uncorroborated testimony of one witness.

=== Seditious Words ===
Section 24B defined seditious words as words expressive of a seditious intention, and Section 24D(1) specified that [a]ny person who, with the intention of causing violence or creating public disorder or a public disturbance, writes, prints, utters or publishes any seditious words shall be guilty of an indictable offence punishable by [i]mprisonment [sic?] for 3 years.

=== Summary Prosecution ===
Section 24E allowed that, while an accused person might elect to be committed for trial, sedition could, with the consent of the Attorney-General, be prosecuted summarily, in which case the applicable penalty would be imprisonment for a period not exceeding 12 months.

=== Good Faith ===
Section 24F specified that nothing in the preceding provisions made it unlawful:

(a) to endeavour in good faith to show that the Sovereign, the Governor-General, the Governor of a State, the Administrator of a Territory, or the advisers of any of them, or the persons responsible for the government of another country, has or have been, or is or are, mistaken in any of his or their counsels, policies or actions;
(b) to point out in good faith errors or defects in the government, the constitution, the legislation or the administration of justice of or in the Commonwealth, a State, a Territory or another country, with a view to the reformation of those errors or defects;
(c) to excite in good faith another person to attempt to procure by lawful means the alteration of any matter established by law in the Commonwealth, a State, a Territory or another country;
(d) to point out in good faith, in order to bring about their removal, any matters that are producing, or have a tendency to produce, feelings of ill-will or hostility between different classes of persons; or
(e) to do anything in good faith in connexion with an industrial dispute or an industrial matter.

In considering a good faith defence, it was specifically noted that the Court might consider whether the case involved the safety or defence of the Commonwealth; assistance to countries or organisations at war with the country or its allies, or to enemies of its allies (whether or not they are enemies of Australia); traitors or saboteurs; or the intention of causing violence or creating public disorder or a public disturbance.

=== Unlawful Organisations ===
Section 30A declared that any body of persons, incorporated or unincorporated (or [a]ny branch or committee of an unlawful association, and any institution or school conducted by or under the authority or apparent authority of an unlawful association) which by its constitution or propaganda or otherwise advocates or encourages (or which is, or purports to be, affiliated with any organization which advocates or encourages) sabotage; damage to property used in cross-border trade or commerce; revolution or war against either any civilised country or organised government; or the doing of any act having or purporting to have as an object the carrying out of a seditious intention was an unlawful association for the purposes of the Act.

The Act went on to criminalise members (deemed, in the absence of evidence to the contrary, to include attendees at a meeting, those speaking in public in advocacy of an association or its objects or distributing its literature), officers, representatives and teachers in any institution or school conducted by or under the authority or apparent authority, of an unlawful association, as well as persons printing or selling material produced by, or intentionally permitting a meeting in their premises of, such an association.

== Howard-era Laws ==
Schedule 7 of the Anti-Terrorism Bill (No. 2) 2005, passed by the Upper House on 6 December 2005, repealed Sections 24A to 24E of the Crimes Act (1914) and reintroduced them, along with several new classes of offence, in a Division 80—Treason and sedition. Crimes in this division now attract a maximum penalty of seven years' imprisonment.

=== Seditious Intention ===
The definition of "seditious intention" originally in Section 24A has become (as amended):

An intention to effect any of the following purposes:

(a) to bring the Sovereign into hatred or contempt;

(b) to urge disaffection against the following:

(i) the Constitution;

(ii) the Government of the Commonwealth;

(iii) either House of the Parliament;

(c) to urge another person to attempt, otherwise than by lawful means, to procure a change to any matter established by law in the Commonwealth;

(d) to promote feelings of ill-will or hostility between different groups so as to threaten the peace, order and good government of the Commonwealth.

=== Sedition ===
Subdivision 80.2 of the proposed legislation (as amended) specifically criminalises Urging the overthrow of the Constitution or Government:

(1) A person commits an offence if the person urges another person to overthrow by force or violence:

(a) the Constitution; or
(b) the Government of the Commonwealth, a State or a Territory; or
(c) the lawful authority of the Government of the Commonwealth.

Similarly, it introduces the offence of [urging] another person to interfere by force or violence with lawful processes for an election of a member or members of a House of the Parliament, and Urging violence within the community:

(a) the person urges a group or groups (whether distinguished by race, religion, nationality or political opinion) to use force or violence against another group or other groups (as so distinguished); and
(b) the use of the force or violence would threaten the peace, order and good government of the Commonwealth.

Additionally, it is now specifically illegal to [urge] a person to assist the enemy:

(a) the person urges another person to engage in conduct; and
(b) the first-mentioned person intends the conduct to assist~~, by any means whatever,~~ an organisation or country; and
(c) the organisation or country is:

(i) at war with the Commonwealth, whether or not the existence of a state of war has been declared; and
(ii) specified by Proclamation made for the purpose of paragraph 80.1(1)(e) to be an enemy at war with the Commonwealth.

or to [urge] a person to assist those engaged in armed hostilities:

(a) the person urges another person to engage in conduct; and
(b) the first-mentioned person intends the conduct to assist~~, by any means whatever,~~ an organisation or country; and
(c) the organisation or country is engaged in armed hostilities against the Australian Defence Force.

except where such urgings are by way of, or for the purposes of, the provision of aid of a humanitarian nature.

These new crimes are all punishable by Imprisonment for 7 years.

=== Good Faith ===
The new legislation, in subsection 80.3 Defence for Acts done in Good Faith, updates the circumstances for good faith exemption in a fashion similar to the definition of seditious intention, above.

=== Extraterritoriality ===
The new law specifies, under section 80.4 Extended geographical jurisdiction for offences, that:

Section 15.4 (extended geographical jurisdiction – category D) applies to an offence against this Division

Originally introduced into Australian law as a consequence of Australia's acceptance of the International Criminal Court, Section 15.4 of the Criminal Code Act (1995) provides that offences under category D apply:

(a) whether or not the conduct constituting the alleged offence occurs in Australia; and

(b) whether or not a result of the conduct constituting the alleged offence occurs in Australia.

Category D — initially applicable only to such crimes as genocide and crimes against humanity — specifically omits provisions restricting its scope to Australian citizens, and therefore applies to any person in any country, giving Australia universal jurisdiction over the crime of sedition.

=== Amendments ===
The following amendments were introduced to the Bill prior to its passage.

- (68) Schedule 7, item 4, page 109 (line 14), after an intention, insert to use force or violence.
- (69) Schedule 7, item 12, page 111 (line 11), omit subsection 80.2(2), substitute:

(2) Recklessness applies to the element of the offence under subsection (1) that it is:

(a) the Constitution; or
(b) the Government of the Commonwealth, a State or a Territory; or
(c) the lawful authority of the Government of the Commonwealth;

that the first-mentioned person urges the other person to overthrow.

- (70) Schedule 7, item 12, page 112 (lines 6 and 7), omit , by any means whatever,.
- (71) Schedule 7, item 12, page 112 (lines 18 and 19), omit , by any means whatever,.
- (72) Schedule 7, item 12, page 113 (line 29), at the end of subsection 80.3(1) (before the note), add:

; or (f) publishes in good faith a report or commentary about a matter of public interest.

=== Penalties and Scope ===
The new laws more than double the maximum penalty for sedition from three years imprisonment to seven, and allow certain convictions relating to the use of force or violence on the basis of recklessness rather than proven intent.

However, the amended laws no longer include specific penalties for uttering seditious words, nor provisions relating to seditious enterprises, although the definition of seditious intent continues to apply in the determination of unlawful organisations. Additionally, all prosecutions for sedition (no longer just summary prosecution) now require the approval of the Attorney-General, although this does not apply to arrests.

=== Implications ===
The principal changes to sedition law in the proposed bill seem to involve:

- the inclusion of sedition along with the separate crime of treason under their new joint heading;
- an increase in the maximum penalties from three to seven years;
- the introduction of the concept of recklessness;
- the inapplicability of seditious intention to individuals not associated with an unlawful organisation;
- its extension to foreign citizens.

Perhaps most importantly, the "modernisation" of the laws seems to indicate that the government, apparently in the expectation of an increase in seditious activity, now intend to actively enforce laws which had been allowed to fall into disuse.

=== Review ===
The Anti-Terrorism Bill (No 2.) 2005 included provisions for a five-year review, and has a ten-year sunset clause. In addition, the Coalition backbench committee, in response to significant public outcry about the potential for the new legislation to stifle free speech and despite the government's claims about a new and imminent threat necessitating the passage through both houses of the limited and specific Anti-Terrorism Bill 2005, successfully lobbied the government to introduce an earlier review of the sedition provisions and accept certain minor amendments.

The majority Senate committee report into the Bill, delivered on 28 November 2005, recommended amongst 52 proposed changes that the sedition provisions be removed from the Bill until after a review, claiming they were poorly drafted and undermined free speech, and that the existing law negated any urgency for their introduction. The report's recommendations were dismissed by the government.

==== ALRC Review ====
In December 2005, The Attorney-General Phillip Ruddock foreshadowed an independent review of the amended sedition laws, and provided the Australian Law Reform Commission (ALRC) with formal Terms of Reference for this purpose on 2 March 2006. In particular, the ALRC has been asked to examine:

- whether the amendments, including the sedition offence and defences in sections 80.2 and 80.3 of the Criminal Code, effectively address the problem of urging the use of force or violence;
- whether "sedition" is the appropriate term to identify this conduct;
- whether Part IIA of the Crimes Act, as amended, is effective to address the problem of organisations that advocate or encourage the use of force or violence to achieve political objectives; and
- any related matter.

In carrying out its review, the ALRC will have particular regard to:

- the circumstances in which individuals or organisations intentionally urge others to use force or violence against any group within the community, against Australians overseas, against Australia's forces overseas or in support of an enemy at war with Australia; and
- the practical difficulties involved in proving a specific intention to urge violence or acts of terrorism.

On 20 March 2006 the ALRC, "committed to consulting as widely as possible, within the short timeframe provided", released an Issues Paper and opened submissions until 10 April 2006 to feed the drafting of a discussion paper including legislative options and a final report with recommendations for tabling by the Attorney-General.

In May 2006 the Discussion Paper was released. Responsive public submissions to the inquiry closed on 3 July 2006.

=== Opposition to the Provisions ===
Despite almost unconditional support for the remainder of the Anti-Terrorism Bill, by mid-November the main opposition Australian Labor Party (including two of the Premiers involved in the original COAG meeting) had joined several prominent Coalition backbenchers in calling for the removal of the Bill's sedition provisions, and committed itself to their repeal in the event it gained government.

== Repeal ==
The Government accepted the recommendations of the ALRC report Fighting Words: A Review of Sedition Laws in Australia, which included removing the term 'sedition' and replacing it with the phrase 'urging violence' and clarifying and modernising elements of the offences. The term 'sedition' was removed from in the National Security Legislation Amendment Bill 2010.

== Incitement ==
At common law it is unlawful to incite a crime. Additionally, the Criminal Code Act (1995) specifically details the crimes of incitement and conspiracy, making it an offence to:

- incite, urge, aid or encourage; or
- print or publish any writing which incites to, urges, aids or encourages;
  - the commission of offences against any Federal or Territory law or carrying on of any operation for or by the commission of such offences.

Incitement of or conspiracy to commit an act of sedition would therefore be punishable as a crime, although incitement to incite sedition is specifically not a criminal act under the Code.

== See also ==
- Australian Anti-Terrorism Act 2005
- Sedition Act of 1918, US Law
