= ALE Property Group =

- Traded as: ASX:LEP
- Fate: acquired

ALE Property Group (ASX: LEP) was an Australian-based publicly listed property funds management company that acted as the responsible entity for the Australian Leisure and Entertainment Property Trust (ALE Trust).

Prior to its acquisition the entity owned 82 pubs across Australia, all of which were leased to Endeavour Group's ALH Group, a leisure and entertainment operator owned by Bruce Mathieson.

In December 2021 the company was acquired in a joint bid by Hostplus and Charter Hall.

== See also ==
- Woolworths Group
- Australian Pubs
