= The Star, Sydney =

Casino in Sydney, New South Wales, Australia

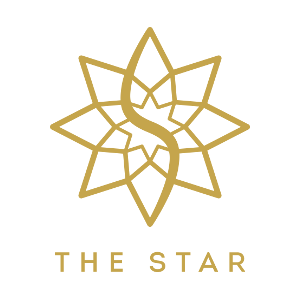

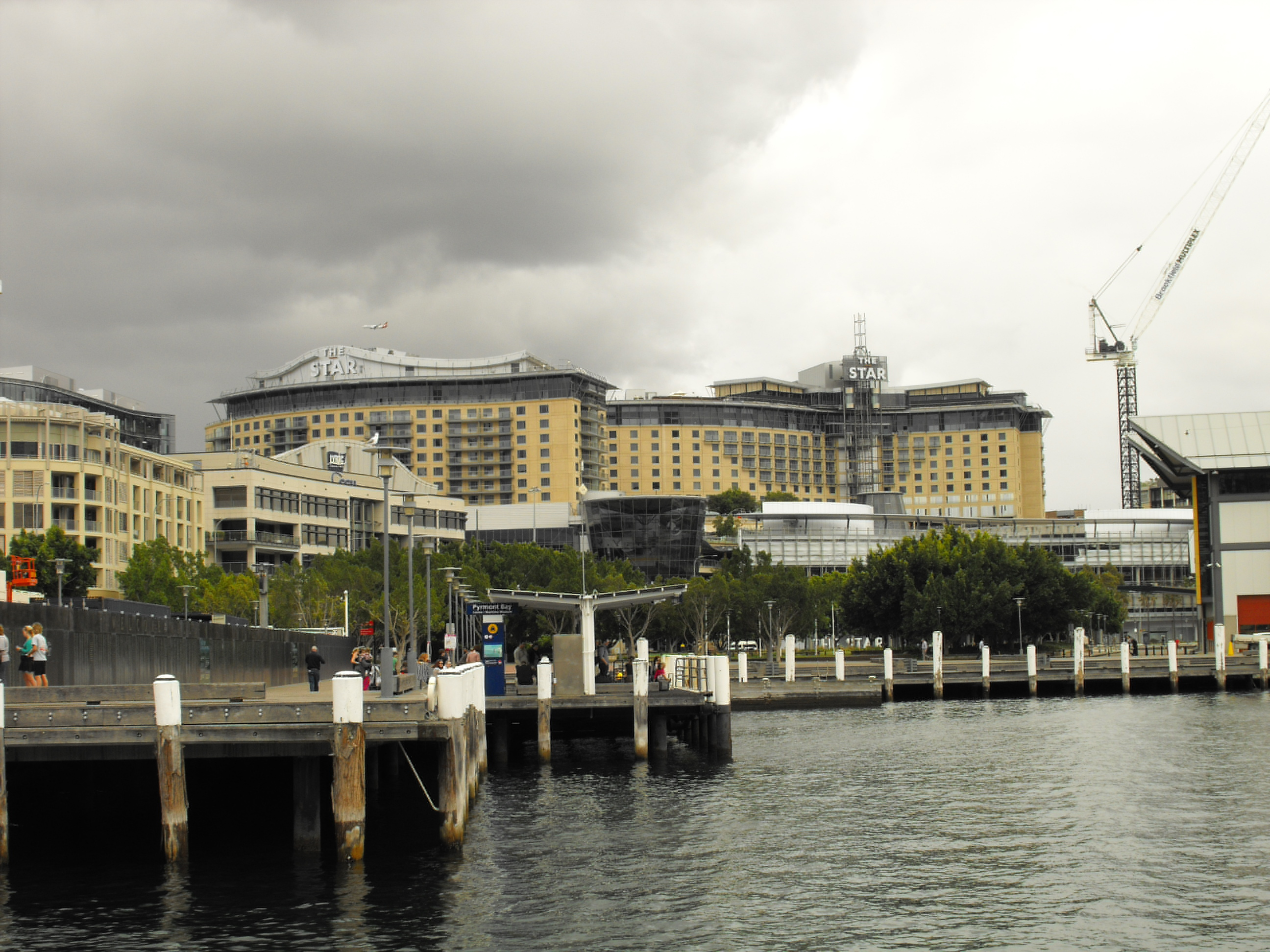
- The Star complex in 2011
- Interactive map of The Star, Sydney
- Location: Pyrmont, Sydney, Australia; 33°52.1′S 151°11.7′E
- Opened: 13 September 1995
- No. of rooms: 351
- Casino type: Land-based
- Owner: Star Entertainment Group
- Architect: Philip Cox
- Previous names: Star City Casino; Sydney Harbour Casino
- Renovated in: 2009–2011 A$961 million
- Website: www.star.com.au/sydney

The Star Sydney (formerly Star City Casino and prior to that, Sydney Harbour Casino) in Pyrmont, Sydney, is the second largest casino in Australia after Melbourne's Crown Casino. Overlooking Darling Harbour, The Star, owned by Star Entertainment Group features two gaming floors, one bar, 3 restaurants, 351 hotel rooms and 130 serviced and privately owned apartments. It also includes the 2,000 seat Sydney Lyric theatre, 360 seat Foundry Theatre and 3,000-seat Event Centre. Its gaming operations are overseen and controlled by the New South Wales Casino Control Authority and is licensed to be the only legal casino in New South Wales. In late 2007, it was granted a 12-year extension of its exclusivity and licence.

In December 1994, a consortium of Leighton Properties and Showboat was announced by the NSW Casino Control Authority as the successful applicant for New South Wales' first casino licence. A temporary casino was opened by Acting Prime Minister Kim Beazley on 13 September 1995 on the site of former wharves 12/13. The permanent casino, designed by Sydney architect, Philip Cox, in joint partnership with American architect, Hillier, opened on 27 November 1997, was one of the largest building projects ever carried out in Australia. The complex is now owned by Star Entertainment Group.

On 29 January 2025, as part of possible sales of non-core assets of the cash-strapped owner The Star, The Star announced it would sell the Event Centre Complex and unspecified spaces within the Complex to Foundation Theatres in order to raise $60 million. The Star is currently under government supervision which will remain in place until September 2025.

== Gaming ==
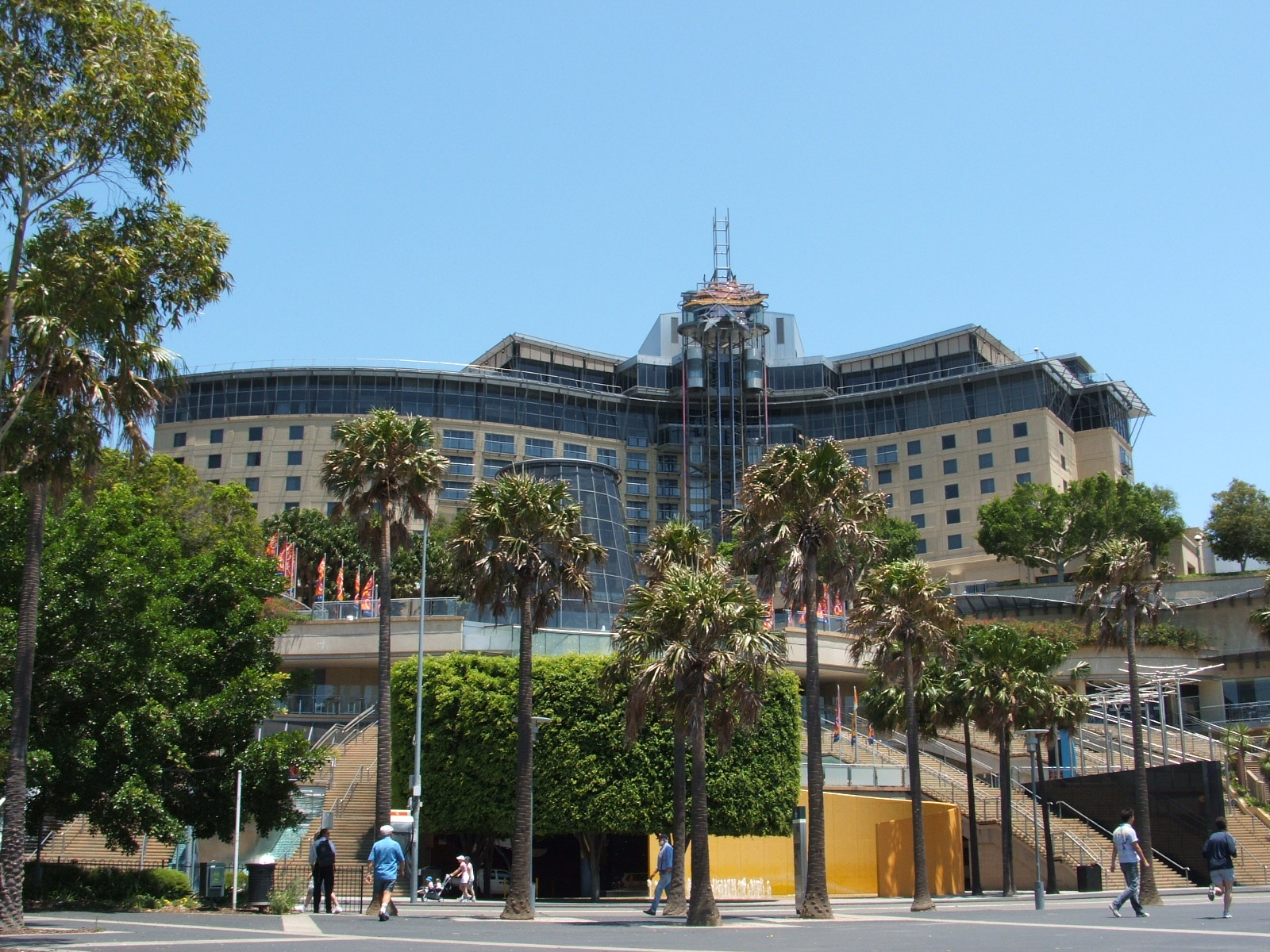
Star City Casino in 2007, prior to its redevelopment

The casino features two gaming floors — the main gaming floor on level one for general entry and the Sovereign Room on level three. The Sovereign Room table bet ranges from $25 to $75,000 and also contains the Inner Sanctum, with table bet ranges of $100 to $500,000. The two areas are only available to high rollers and international guests following an application for membership and review by The Star's management. The Inner Sanctum pits are frequently used for junket players. Star City returned to junket play in 2005 after taking a number of large losses in 2002.

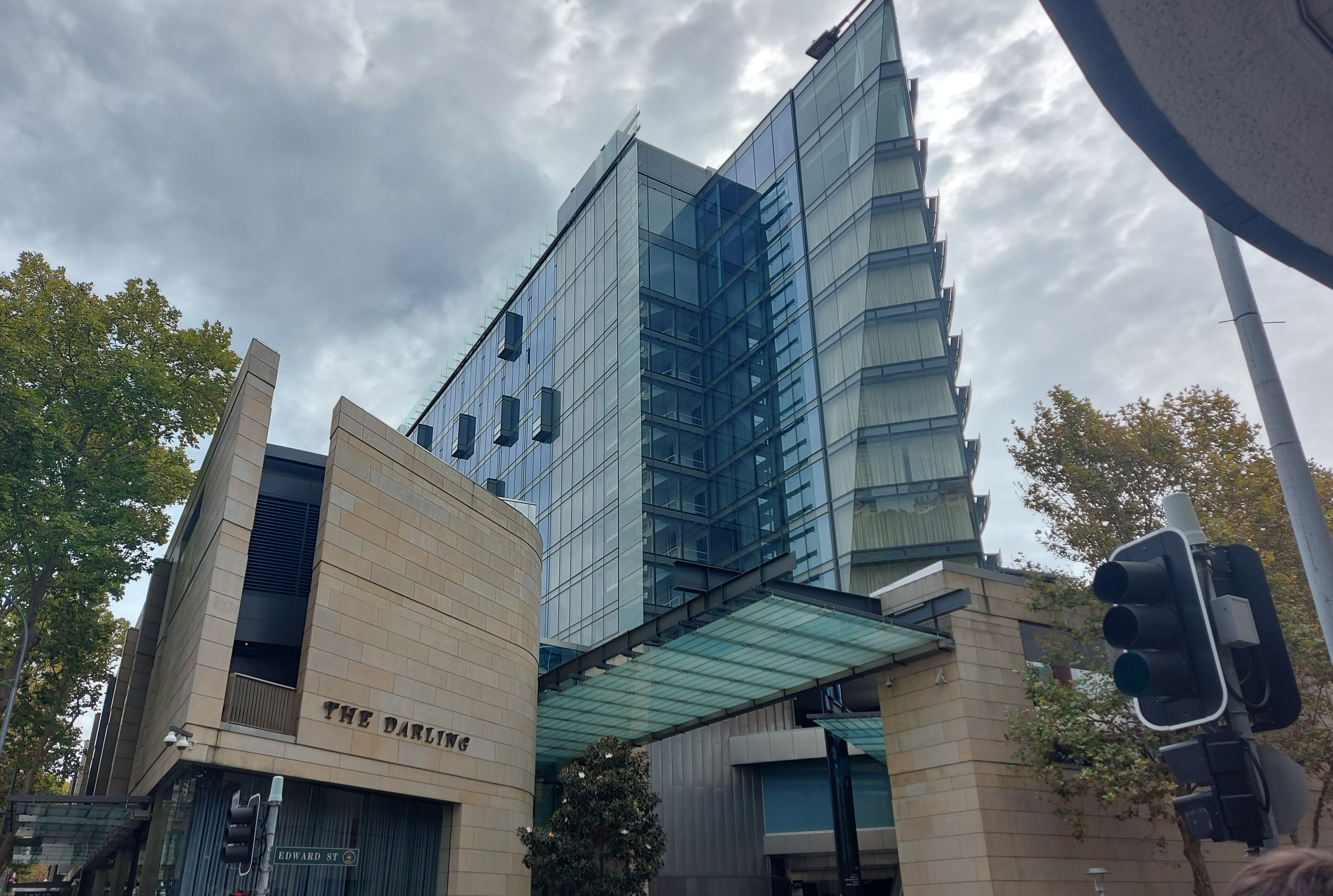
The Darling Hotel, a recent addition to the complex

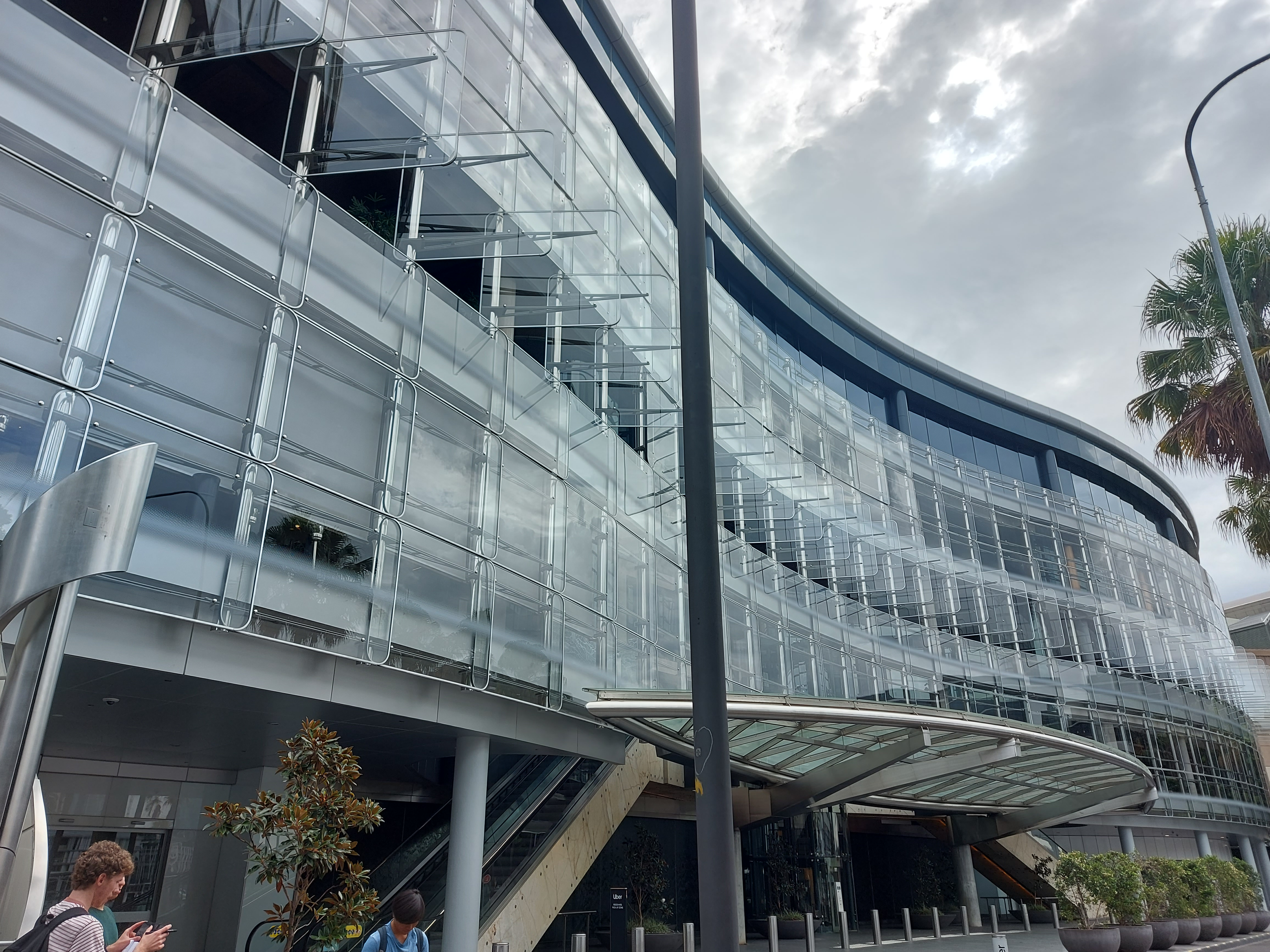
The extension of the complex completed in 2012

Recent rebuilding works have added extra gaming areas for the main gaming floor with the addition of the Oasis Lounge and the 36 Degrees Bar although these new areas have not increased the number of tables or machines available in total. The main gaming floor is divided into three major parts — Table Games, Electronic Gaming, and Poker. The number of poker tables has been steadily increased and now stands at 40 tables.

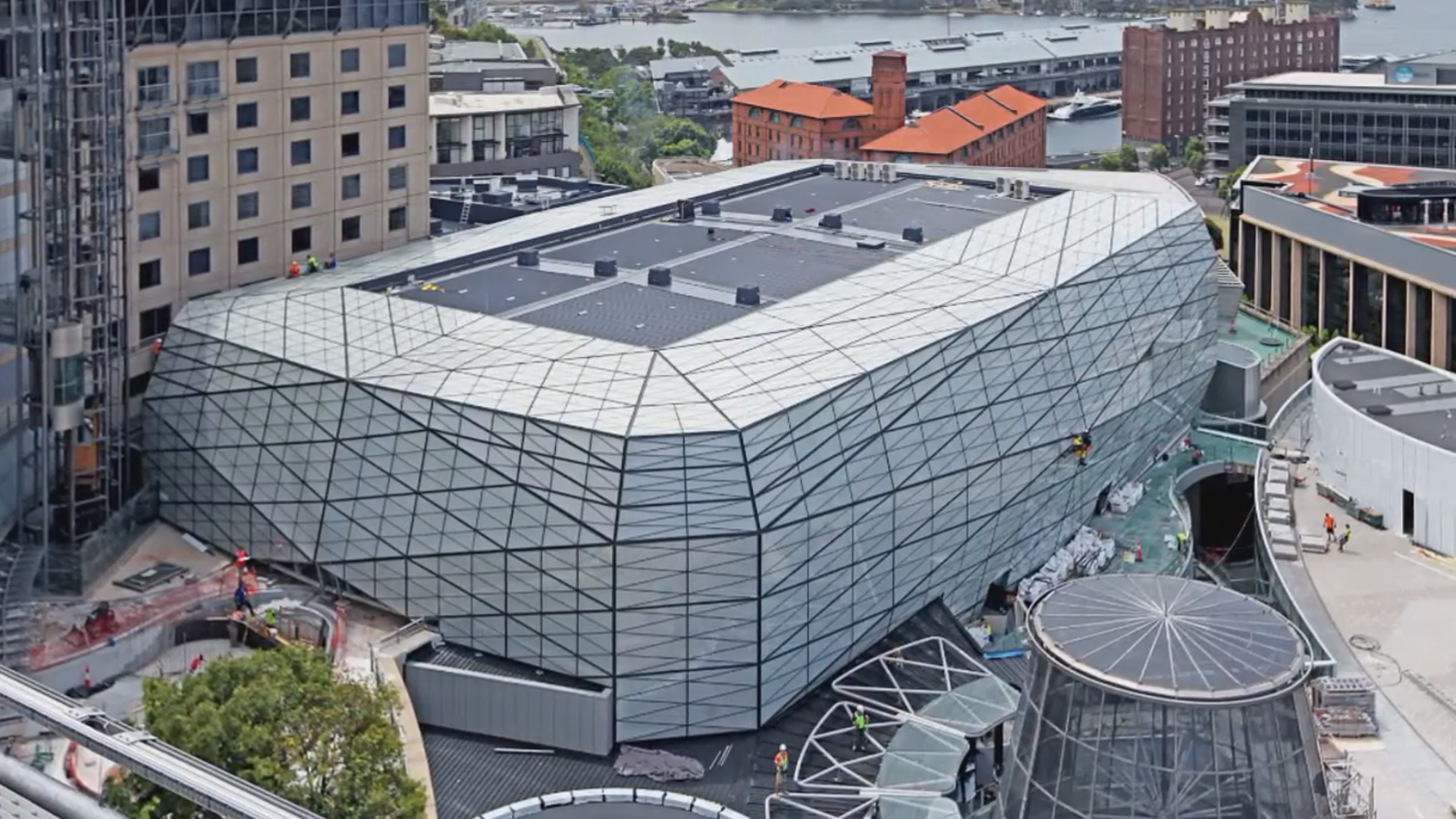
The Star Event Centre

The Sovereign Room has been upgraded and now includes four additional private gaming rooms and extra dining and lounge amenities. These extensions have an estimated cost of $7,000,000. Another recent upgrade is the addition of a new "ultra exclusive" area directly above the Sovereign Room called the Chairmans Lounge. This is accessed by invitation only, and there are currently fewer than 500 Diamond Card Members that are entitled to use the Chairmans Lounge. Star City has recently opened the sports bar as well.

=== Table games ===
The Star provides many traditional casino games, including Mini Baccarat, Blackjack, Caribbean Stud, Craps, Pai Gow, Poker, Pontoon, Roulette, Rapid (semi-electronic) Roulette, Sic Bo and Three card poker

Two-Up was available at Star City but was removed at the end of October 2003 as the game was not considered to be economically viable. The pit typically required three dealers and two games supervisors, consequently management felt that returns were not as high as they could be and with Tabcorp insisting on large reductions in overheads and increased profit, this iconic game was closed.

In December 2005, a new game Double-Chance was trialed but was discontinued soon after; Players, referring to the game's high house advantage, dubbed the game 'No-Chance'.

At the end of 2006, Star City introduced a new game, three card baccarat, following minor reorganization of its main gaming floor in preparation for the smoking ban in July 2007 and planned extensions to its gaming floors. This game was also removed from the floor shortly after due to lack of interest from players.

=== Electronic gaming ===
The Star provides a selection of electronic gaming machines, including slot machines, bingo, rapid roulette and video poker machines. Rapid Big Wheel was introduced in early 2006 to replace the often slow-paced table game version, which has now been reintroduced, and the Rapid Big Wheel removed in August 2007. The Star has just over 1490 electronic gaming machines but is limited to a maximum 1500.

=== Security ===
As in most casinos, the gaming floors of the venue are constantly monitored by a security camera system. Cameras mounted on the roof and in the table signs are used to ensure that all actions are logged. The footage can be used to settle player disputes, identify cheating, and be used in the Australian court system for prosecution.

$500 chips were removed from the casino after fraudulent chips were found. Some chips did make their way into the bank due to limited security features on the chips.

== Restaurants and bars ==
The Star has a large variety of restaurants including five star fine dining. Not all the restaurants are managed by The Star with a number of outlets being privately managed. The Star's Harvest Buffet is known for its all you can eat buffet with seafood buffet over the weekend.

The Star operates eight bars within the complex with a further two outlets designated as bars and another two external independent outlets able to serve alcohol. Bars within the gaming area are not accessible to minors (persons under 18). Some bars have live entertainment, mostly on weekends. The Lagoon Bar and Glo Bar closed in 2009 as part of the refurbishment project.

== Marquee ==
A new nightclub, known as the Marquee, opened on 31 March 2012.

== Redevelopment ==
In 2009, Tabcorp, the then-owners of Star City, announced an A$475 million refurbishment and expansion program called Project Star which involved the re-orientation of the casino towards Sydney Harbour, including a new "iconic" entrance as well as a drop-off zone on the harbour side of the casino site. Work began in late 2009 and was completed late 2012. Despite initial cost estimates, according to Echo Entertainment Group CEO, Larry Mullin the final cost was estimated to be around A$961 million. On 16 September 2011, the casino reopened under the name "The Star".

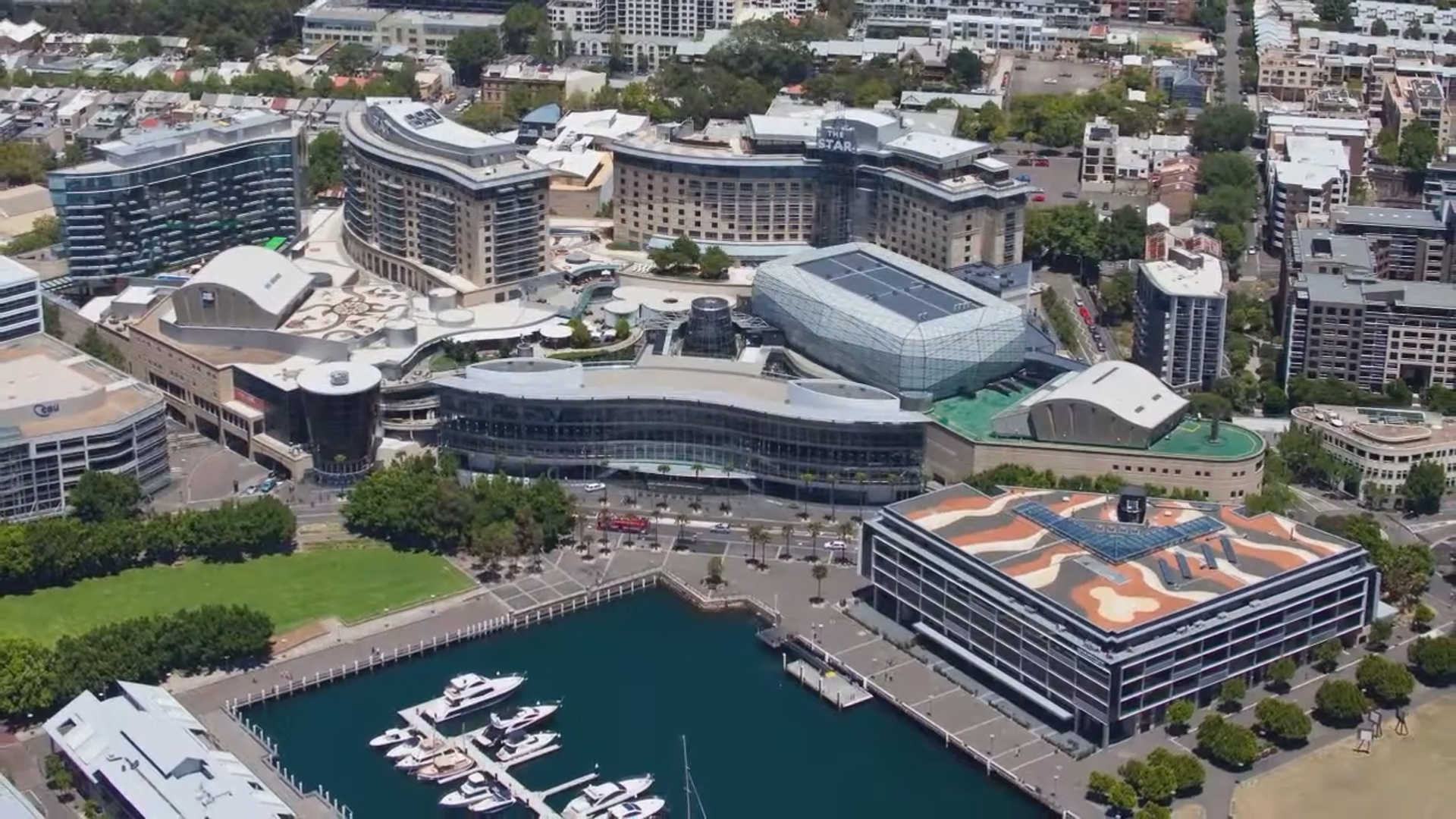
An aerial view of The Star complex after its refurbishment and expansion

== Popular culture ==
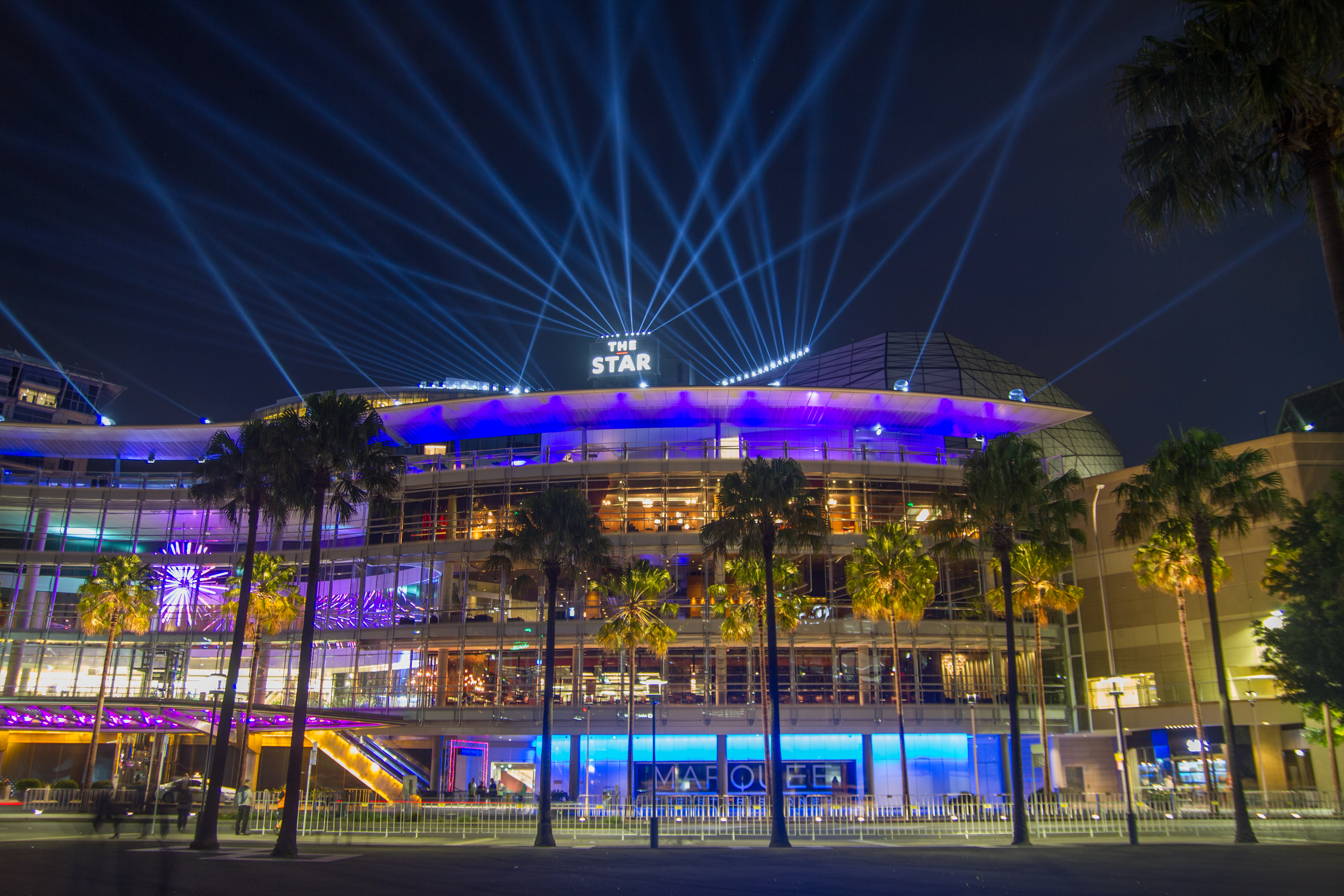
The Star during Vivid, 2015

The venue has featured awards nights including playing host to the annual film and television AACTA Awards. The first 12 episodes of the 2005–2006 Australian television series Joker Poker was filmed in a private gaming room at the casino. The game was dealt by experienced The Star croupiers; however the show was not a success. Also filmed there were several episodes of Beauty and the Geek Australia. The now defunct Ralph magazine shot its swimsuit model of the year competition at Turbines Health Club (pool and gym for the hotel and apartments).

== See also ==
- List of integrated resorts
