= Cash controls =

Cash controls are the regulations imposed by many countries at their national borders on the physical movement of currency (or an equivalent, such as traveler's cheques, promissory notes, money orders) into and out of the country. Often, the requirement is for the traveler to merely declare to customs that they have on them more than the maximum allowable unreported amount, and any attempt to bring more than this amount may lead to all of the cash being confiscated, besides other penalties. The requirement may be to obtain a permit from a government agency for such movements. Some countries do not have any border cash controls, though even countries like Switzerland now impose restrictions and a requirement to declare the large amount of cash. The most frequent threshold amount of cash (or equivalent) that may cross a national border without restriction is US$10,000, or some national equivalent, usually rounded to multiples of 1,000. Other types of cash control may include restricting the entry of national currency in a foreign country subject to embargoes, such as currently the case between the EU and Russia, where anybody exiting a Schengen borders towards the Russian Federation cannot carry any EU currency in cash (euro, Polish złoty, Czech crown, etc.).

== Purposes ==
The purpose of these regulations is part of a strategy to combat money laundering and to counter the financing of terrorism, and to combat other transnational crime, or it may be to stop the flight of capital to another jurisdiction.

On the other hand, some countries require travelers from a foreign country to show that they carry "sufficient funds" (including credit cards, cash, travelers checks, money orders etc.) when visiting their country to prove that they can cover their travel, lodging, entertainment, meals, etc. before they are admitted into the country.

== See also ==
- Money laundering
