= Organisations listed as terrorist organisations under Australia's Criminal Code =

In Australia, listed terrorist organisations are organisations that have been designated by the Australian Government as terrorist organisations under the country's Criminal Code. A list of terrorist organisations was first created under the Security Legislation Amendment (Terrorism) Act 2002, as part of the United States–led "war on terror". Most of the organisations on the list have never targeted Australia.

== History ==
The Security Legislation Amendment (Terrorism) Act 2002 was passed by the Australian Parliament and inserted a range of terrorist organisation offences into the Criminal Code Act 1995 (Cth). For example, the Act made it an offence to provide support to a terrorist organisation.

The paramilitary wing of Hamas, the Izz al-Din al-Qassam Brigades, was formerly listed as a terrorist organisation from 5 November 2003 until 2022. In July 2014, it was reported that the entirety of Hamas was being listed by the Abbott government; however, it did not appear on the list, and Izz al-Din al-Qassam Brigades was re-listed in 2015, 2018 and 2021. Hamas was listed in March 2022, replacing Izz al-Din al-Qassam Brigades.

Most of the listed organisations are Islamic. In 2021, the Australian Government listed for the first time two far-right neo-Nazi organisations, Sonnenkrieg Division and The Base, followed by the National Socialist Order in 2022.

In addition to The Base, the entirety of Hezbollah was added on 24 November 2021.

In 2025, the Australian Government announced that the Islamic Revolutionary Guard Corps (IRGC) would be listed after it was revealed Iran was responsible for at least two antisemitic attacks in Australia. On 27 November, the government listed the IRGC under a new category as a "state sponsor of terrorism" with the Criminal Code Amendment (State Sponsors of Terrorism) Act 2025. Restrictions on state sponsors of terrorism and the processes for listing are similar to those of terrorist organisations.

== Oversight and monitoring ==
The list of designated terror organisations is maintained by the Attorney-General's Department. For listing as a terrorist organisation, an organisation may be found to be such by a court as part of a prosecution for a terrorist offence, or the designation may be made by regulation upon the motion of the Attorney-General of Australia under Division 102 of the Criminal Code Act 1995. Listing, de-listing and re-listing follows a protocol that mainly involves the Australian Security Intelligence Organisation and the Attorney-General's Department. Such action in general is not made with reference to designations made or proposed by other countries or multinational organisations. Until 2023, listings would lapse after three years and an organisation would need to be re-listed. The Counter-Terrorism Legislation Amendment (Prohibited Hate Symbols and Other Measures) Act 2023 changed this so that listings now continue indefinitely.

Under Division 103 of the Criminal Code Act 1995, it is illegal to finance terrorism. The Australian Transaction Reports and Analysis Centre (AUSTRAC) monitors financial transactions involving listed terrorist organisations.

== Listed terrorist organisations ==
As of June 2025, the Australian Government lists 31 organisations as terrorist organisations:

| Name (as listed) | Date first listed |
|---|---|
| Abu Sayyaf Group (ASG) | 14 November 2002 |
| Al-Qa'ida (AQ) | 21 October 2002 |
| Al-Qa'ida in the Arabian Peninsula (AQAP) | 26 November 2010 |
| Al-Qa'ida in the Indian Subcontinent (AQIS) | 29 November 2016 |
| Al-Qa'ida in the Lands of the Islamic Maghreb (AQIM) | 14 November 2002 |
| Al-Shabaab | 22 August 2009 |
| Ansar Allah | 24 May 2024 |
| Boko Haram | 26 June 2014 |
| Hamas | 4 March 2022 (Note: Izz al-Din al-Qassam Brigades had been listed from 5 November 2003.) |
| Hay'at Tahrir al-Sham | 9 April 2022 (Note: The predecessor to Hay'at Tahrir al-Sham, Jabhat al-Nusra, was previously listed on 29 June 2013 and re-listed on 28 June 2016 and 9 April 2019.) |
| Hizballah | 10 December 2021 |
| Hurras al-Din | 9 April 2022 |
| Islamic State | 11 July 2014 (Note: Islamic State was first listed as "Al-Qa'ida in Iraq" on 2 March 2005 and later listed as "Islamic State of Iraq and the Levant" on 14 December 2013.) |
| Islamic State East Asia | 12 September 2017 |
| Islamic State in Libya (IS-Libya) | 29 November 2016 |
| Islamic State Khorasan Province | 3 November 2017 |
| Islamic State Sinai Province (IS-Sinai) | 29 November 2016 |
| Islamic State Somalia (IS-Somalia) | 17 September 2019 |
| Islamic State West Africa Province | 1 July 2020 |
| Jaish-e-Mohammed | 11 April 2003 |
| Jama'at Mujahideen Bangladesh | 9 June 2018 |
| Jama'at Nusrat al-Islam wal-Muslimin (Note: Formerly listed as Al-Murabitun.) | 5 November 2014 |
| Jemaah Islamiyah (JI) | 27 October 2002 |
| Kurdistan Workers' Party (PKK) | 17 December 2005 |
| Lashkar-e-Taiba | 5 November 2003 |
| National Socialist Order (NSO) | 18 February 2022 |
| Neo-Jama'at Mujahideen Bangladesh | 9 June 2021 |
| Palestinian Islamic Jihad | 3 May 2004 |
| Sonnenkrieg Division | 12 August 2021 |
| Terrorgram | 27 June 2025 |
| The Base | 10 December 2021 |

== Listed state sponsors of terrorism ==
As of November 2025, the Australian Government lists just one foreign entity as state sponsor of terrorism:

| Name (as listed) | Date listed |
|---|---|
| Islamic Revolutionary Guard Corps | 28 November 2025 |

== Terrorism financing laws ==
Australian anti-terrorism financing laws include:

- Criminal Code Act 1995 (Cth):
  - section 102.6 – getting funds to, from or for a terrorist organisation
  - section 102.7 – providing support to a terrorist organisation
  - section 103.1 – financing terrorism
  - section 103.2 – financing a terrorist, and
  - section 119.4(5) – giving or receiving goods and services to promote the commission of a foreign incursion offence.
- Charter of the United Nations Act 1945 (Cth):
  - section 20 – dealing with freezable assets, and
  - section 21 – giving an asset to a proscribed person or entity.

These offences sanction persons and entities under Australian and international law. The responsibility of prosecuting these offences in Australia rests with the Australian Federal Police, state police forces and the Commonwealth Director of Public Prosecutions.

== See also ==
- Anti-Terrorism Act 2005
- Australian anti-terrorism legislation, 2004
- List of designated terrorist groups
- Terrorism in Australia
