= Ord Minnett =

Financial services organisation

- Industry: Financial services
- Founded: 1951
- Founder: Charles Ord; Jack Minnett
- Headquarters: Sydney, Australia
- Key people: Karl Morris (Managing Director)
- Services: Wealth management; Financial advice; Corporate finance; Private capital; Stockbroking
- Website: www.ords.com.au

Ord Minnett is an Australian wealth management company.

== History ==
Ord Minnett was founded in 1951 by Charles Ord and Jack Minnett. In 1969, Bankers Trust and Ord Minnett formed BT-Ord, a merchant bank with Ord Minnett having a 60% shareholding. Ord Minnett sold out to Bankers Trust in 1972.

Westpac purchased a 50% shareholding in July 1984, before exercising an option to take full ownership in April 1987. Westpac sold out in August 1993, with Jardine Fleming and staff each owning 50%. Australian Wealth Management purchased a 70% shareholding in May 2008 with JPMorgan Chase, that had purchased Jardine Fleming, retaining 30%. In September 2019 Ord Minnett was sold in a management buyout.
