= Death of Abu Bakr al-Baghdadi =

2019 U.S. military operation in Syria

Operation Kayla Mueller
- Part of the United States intervention in Syria during the Syrian civil war, the War against the Islamic State and War on terror
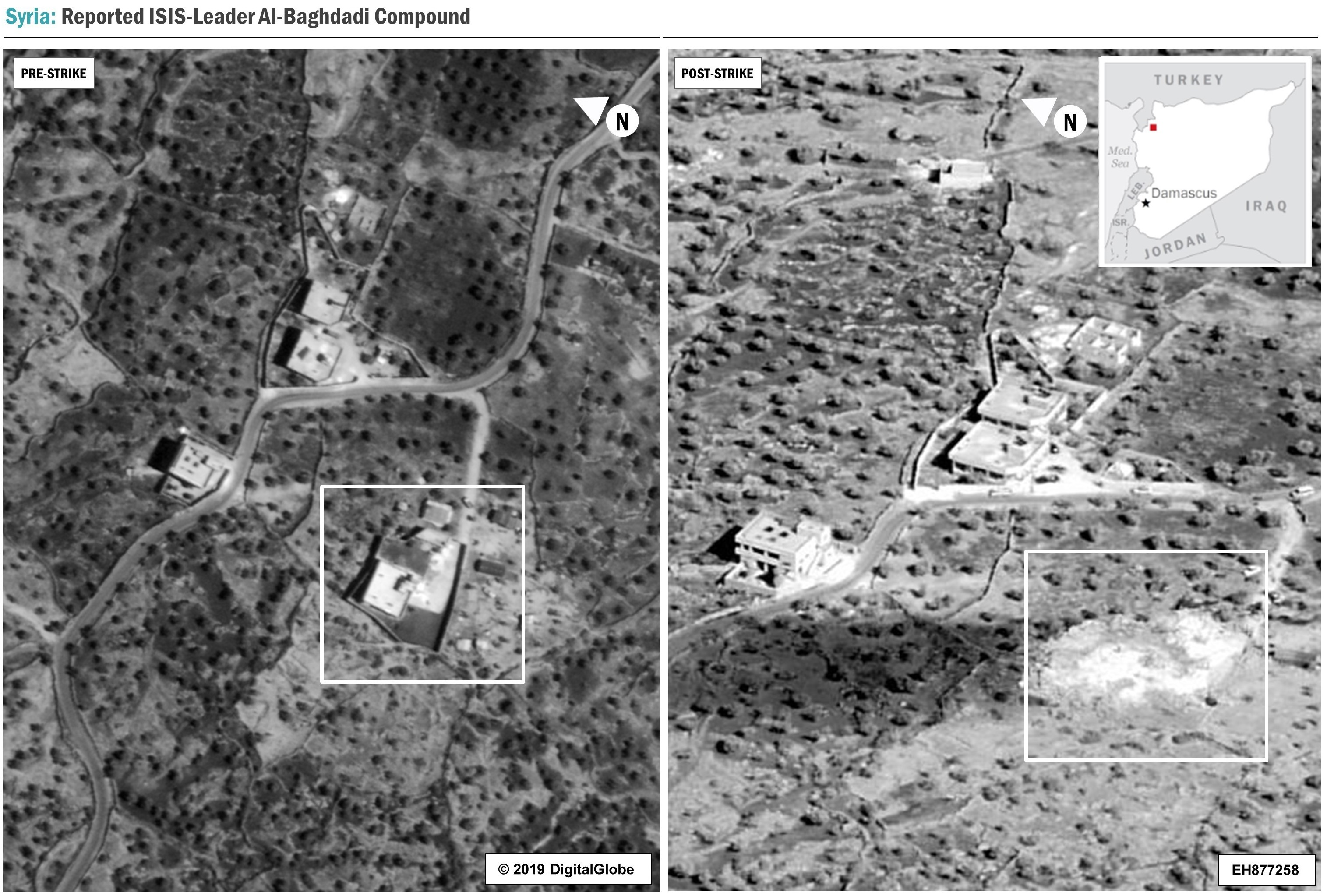
- Baghdadi's compound, before and after the U.S. special operations raid, 26–27 October 2019
Date	26–27 October 2019 (1 day)
Location	300 meters outside Barisha, Harem District, Idlib Governorate, Syria 36.1658°N 36.6274°E
Result	American victory: Successful raid on Abu Bakr al-Baghdadi's compound; Death of al-Baghdadi by suicide belt; Seizure of materials and captives from compound; compound later destroyed by U.S. fighter jets and drones

Belligerents
United States	Islamic State

Commanders and leaders
(United States) Donald Trump (United States) Mark Esper (United States) Kenneth F. McKenzie Jr. (United States) Mark A. Milley	Abu Bakr al-Baghdadi ‡‡

Units involved
Joint Special Operations Command (JSOC); A squadron, 1st SFOD-D (Delta Force); 160th Special Operations Aviation Regiment (Airborne); 75th Ranger Regiment	Military of the Islamic State

Strength
~100 JSOC operators 8 helicopters Unknown number of military working dogs and robots	Unknown

Casualties and losses
2 soldiers and 1 dog injured	16–21 killed: 6 IS members including Baghdadi; 10–15 non-IS militants; 2 militants captured
- 2 children died after Baghdadi detonated his vest 2 civilians killed and one injured by U.S. airstrikes
- Location of Barisha in Syria

On October 26–27, 2019, the United States conducted a military operation codenamed Operation Kayla Mueller that resulted in the death of Abu Bakr al-Baghdadi, the then-leader and self-proclaimed caliph of the Islamic State. The operation took place in the outskirts of Barisha, Idlib Governorate, Syria. According to General Kenneth F. McKenzie Jr., the United States Central Command (CENTCOM) commander who oversaw the operation, Baghdadi killed himself along with two children when he detonated a suicide belt while fleeing from U.S. forces during the raid.

The U.S. operation was named for Kayla Mueller, an American aid worker who had been captured by and died in the custody of the Islamic State.

== Background ==
The raid was launched based on an intelligence effort to locate the leader of IS by the CIA's Special Activities Center. The New York Times reported that, according to two U.S. officials, the CIA obtained the original intelligence on Baghdadi following the arrests of one of his wives and a courier, after which the CIA worked closely with Iraqi and Kurdish intelligence officials in Iraq and Syria.

The Guardian, however, reported Iraqi officials as saying that the break came after a smuggler (who had smuggled the wives of two brothers of Baghdadi and Baghdadi's children in the past), a woman thought to be his wife, and Baghdadi's nephew provided information on the routes and destinations.

Iraqi officials also stated that the arrest of Muhammad Ali Sajid al-Zobaie, Baghdadi's brother-in-law, helped them in finding a desert tunnel leading to two well-stocked hideouts near Al-Qaim, Iraq, and thereby penetrate a smuggling ring to find Baghdadi. A U.S. official disputed the Iraqi account that Iraq had provided the exact location of Baghdadi, and stated that the operation was triggered when he appeared in a monitored location.

=== Location ===
Reuters reported Iraqi intelligence officials as stating that the arrest of several Islamic State leaders was the key behind learning about Baghdadi's movements and hiding places. They said that Ismael al-Ethawi, believed to be a top aide to Baghdadi, was found and followed by informants in Syria, apprehended by Turkish authorities, and handed over to Iraqi intelligence agents to whom he provided information in February 2018. The Iraqis then gave the information to the CIA, who kept surveillance on the discovered location through a satellite and drones. They also said that in 2019 the United States, Turkish and Iraqi intelligence conducted a joint operation in which they captured several high-ranking IS leaders, including four Iraqis and a Syrian, who provided the locations where they met with Baghdadi inside Syria, after which they decided to coordinate with the CIA to deploy more sources inside these areas. An Iraqi official remarked that Baghdadi's "last moment to live" was when he and his family left the location that they were in for the first time in five months.

Ethawi and the other aides in an interview to The New York Times stated that they were blindfolded before being taken to meet their leader, in order to keep his whereabouts secret, they were then kept at the location for hours before being blindfolded again and driven away from the site.

Baghdadi's compound was located near GPS coordinates 36.1660, 36.6274, in Syria's Idlib Governorate. Although Idlib was dominated by the Islamic State's rival jihadist group Hayat Tahrir al-Sham (HTS), which had connections to al-Qaeda, the Institute for the Study of War warned that Idlib was nevertheless the focus of an IS strategy to raise the next cohort of IS and al-Qaeda recruits. HTS operatives had themselves been hunting for al-Baghdadi in the days prior to the US operation, raiding the town of Sarmin and eventually capturing a close aide to al-Baghadi, Abu Suleiman al-Khalidi, further reducing the IS leader's safety network.

In July 2019, Chairman of the Joint Chiefs of Staff Joseph Dunford explained that there were around 20,000–30,000 rebels in Idlib by that time in the ongoing Syrian civil war, many of them jihadists. U.S. deputy assistant secretary of defense for the Middle East Michael P. Mulroy said that "Idlib is essentially the largest collection of al-Qaeda affiliates in the world." In regard to Baghdadi's possible rationale for choosing the location, "We assess that he was hiding in Idlib province to avoid the intense pressure that had been put on ISIS in other areas of Syria," operational commander General Kenneth McKenzie later stated.

Documents later obtained by Al Aan TV's Jenan Moussa reportedly revealed that, from 1 February 2019 until the day of the U.S. raid, Baghdadi's compound had internet access and that the owner of the site paid the equivalent of an $8 monthly fee in cash to the regional ISP for service. According to Moussa, the username Baghdadi used was "mhrab." Baghdadi's compound was destroyed after the successful operation to be sure it would not become a memorial.

=== SDF role ===
The Kurdish-led Syrian Democratic Forces (SDF) reported that they provided direct and extensive support to the operation. Prior to the raid, the SDF, working with the U.S. government, had spent five months gathering intelligence on Baghdadi's location. A senior U.S. State Department official said that the Kurdish-led SDF "played a key role" in the raid on Baghdadi's compound and that the United States was in close communication with SDF commander General Mazloum Abdi about every aspect of their operation, and Abdi's statements about the raid, in reference to the joint intelligence cooperation on the ground, were accurate. Abdi said the operation had been delayed by a month due to Turkey's military build-up at the Syrian border and the Turkish incursion into northeastern Syria that followed.

The New York Times reported that unnamed U.S. intelligence, military, and counter-terrorism officials said that the abrupt withdrawal of U.S. forces from northern Syria by President Donald Trump had complicated the plans for the operation against Baghdadi, but the Syrian Kurds continued to provide information to the CIA amidst the Turkish offensive. One of the officials remarked that both the Syrian and Iraqi Kurds had provided more intelligence for the raid than any single country.

CENTCOM commander General Kenneth McKenzie later confirmed the SDF had provided intelligence to American forces prior to the raid in Idlib, but denied reports that President Trump's prior order to withdraw forces from north Syria had any impact on the timing or execution of the mission.

==== Embedded informant ====
The Washington Post reported that, according to a U.S. official, an IS militant-turned informant for the Kurds had provided critical intelligence about Baghdadi's location. The SDF commander, General Abdi, said that their informant was deep inside Baghdadi's inner circle as a security adviser and had provided a detailed layout of the complex, and was on-site during the operation, after which he left with the U.S. forces. SDF officials said that the informant had stolen Baghdadi's underwear and a sample of Baghdadi's blood, which was provided to the U.S. intelligence for DNA analysis and resulted in a positive match. U.S. and Middle East–based officials stated that the informant was a Sunni Arab IS operative, who served as a trusted facilitator and logistics aide to Baghdadi, but defected because IS killed his relative, after which he was cultivated as an intelligence asset by the SDF. They said that, after the SDF leadership handed control over the informant to U.S. intelligence, he was carefully vetted for several weeks by them and that the effort to begin exploiting this intelligence asset began in the summer of 2019. The informant was subsequently extracted from the region with his family two days after the raid and will likely receive at least some of the $25 million bounty.

== Prelude ==
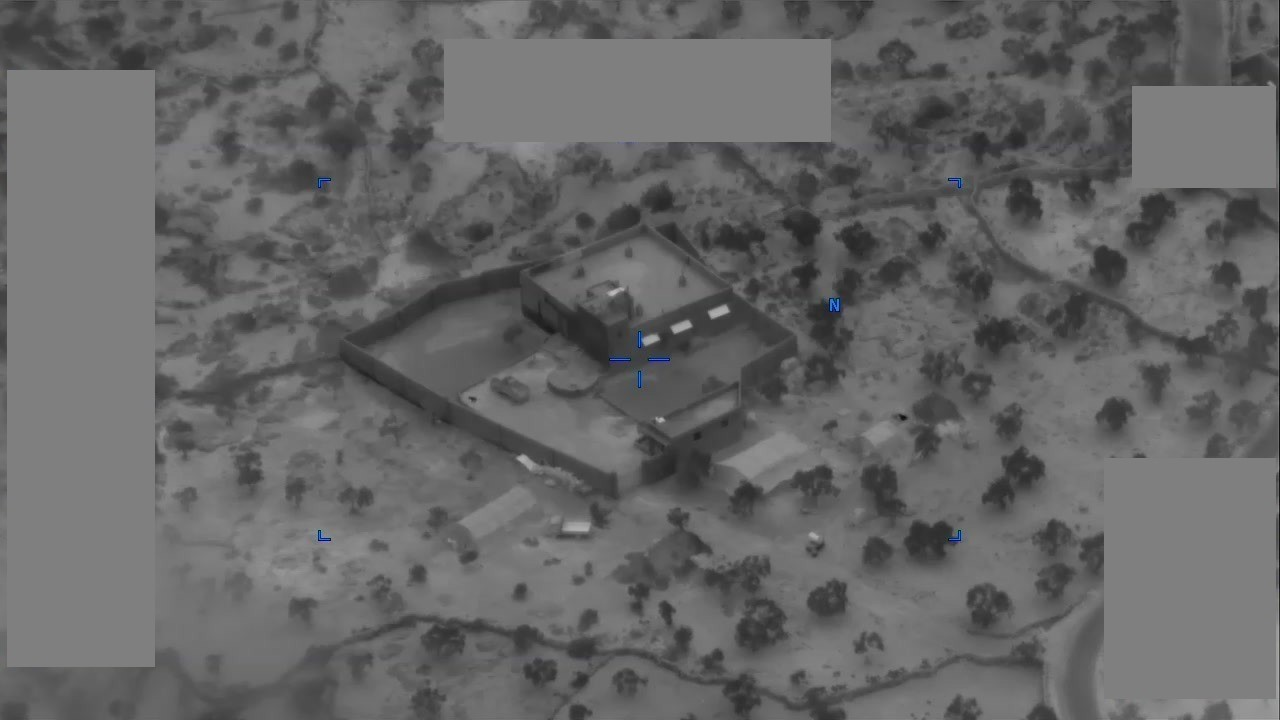
A U.S. drone view of Baghdadi's compound

Two U.S. officials stated that Baghdadi had been staying at the compound in Barisha since July 2019 and that it had been under surveillance since, but U.S. forces avoided assaulting it due to the presence of al-Qaeda affiliates and the airspace being controlled and monitored by Russia and the Syrian government. Some U.S. officials claimed that the Pentagon decided to carry out the mission after President Donald Trump ordered the withdrawal of U.S. forces from northern Syria in early October, as to not lose track of Baghdadi. However, CENTCOM commander Frank McKenzie stated that the north Syria pullout had "absolutely" no effect on the timing or execution of the operation. "We chose the time based on a variety of factors: weather, certainty, lunar data ... We struck because the time was about right to do it then given the totality of the intelligence and the other factors that would affect the raid force going in and coming out," General McKenzie added.

The Turkish Defense Ministry said that Turkish and U.S. military authorities exchanged and coordinated information ahead of the attack in Idlib. A U.S. official stated that Turkey was informed prior to the operation to avoid an unintended clash between their forces, but was not notified about the target due to concerns that the information would become compromised and did not provide any assistance to the operation. Turkish officials also informed Hayat Tahrir al-Sham, which controlled much of the area where the raid took place at the time, not to open fire on the helicopters that would be used in the operation; despite being informed, anti-aircraft fire by HTS was used, however, the operators were detained by HTS commanders afterward for not following orders.

General McKenzie briefed Defense Department leaders on the intelligence and the plan on October 25 and received the approval of Secretary of Defense Mark Esper and Chairman of the Joint Chiefs of Staff Mark Milley for the operation. President Trump was then briefed "on all aspects of the plan and the risks involved in its execution" and that Russia and Turkey were contacted ahead of the mission to avoid unintended clashes. With Trump's approval, McKenzie, as operational commander, gave the order for the mission to start October 26 around 9 a.m. EST.

=== Operational name ===
The operation was named after Kayla Mueller, an American aid worker who was abducted by IS in Syria in August 2013. During her captivity, she was reportedly forced into marriage with al-Baghdadi, during which time she was repeatedly raped, tortured, and physically abused. She was confirmed dead in early February 2015, reportedly murdered by al-Baghdadi himself.

The special forces that were to carry out the operation named their task force "Task Force 8-14", based on Mueller's birthday.

== Raid ==
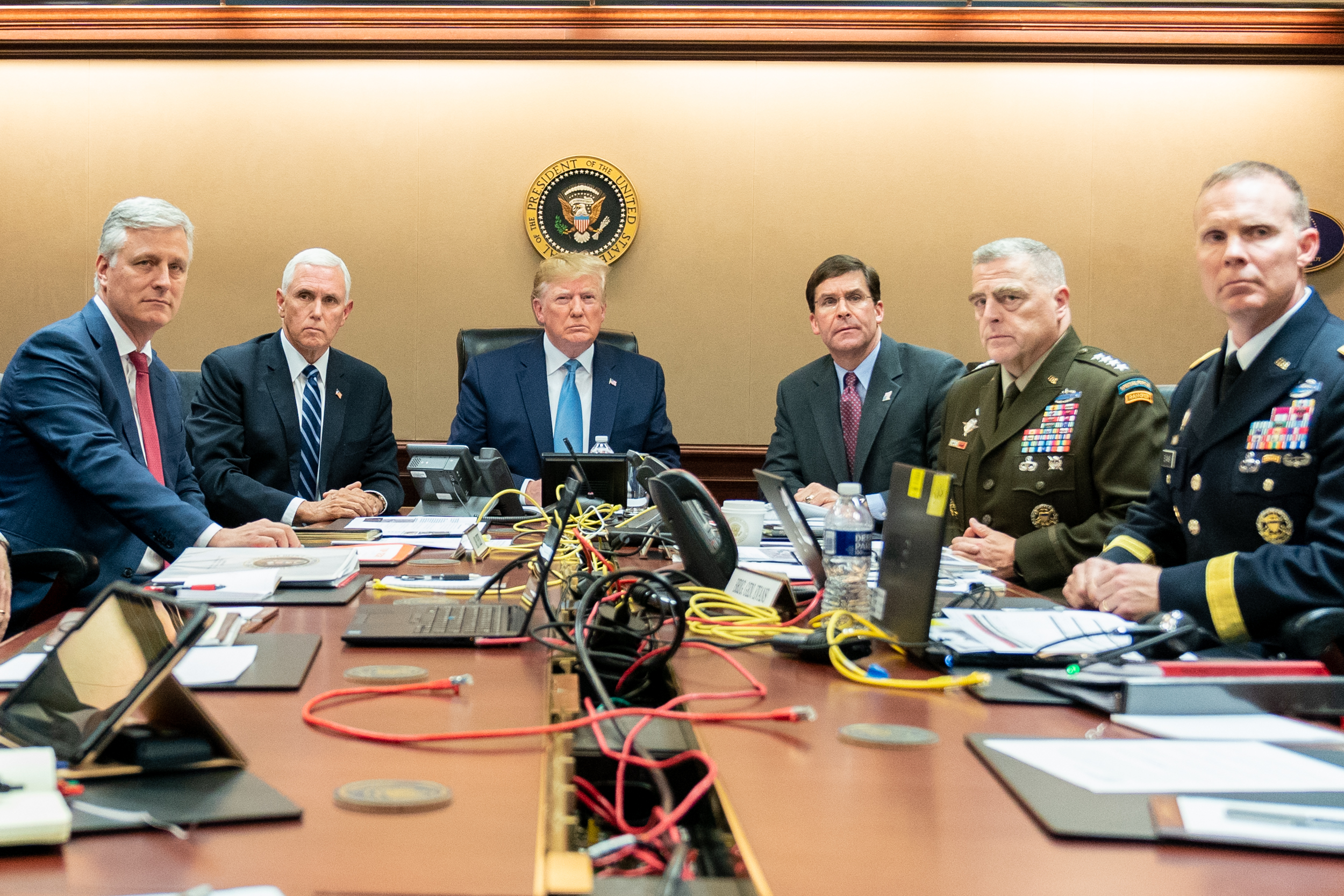
From left: U.S. National Security Advisor Robert O'Brien, Vice President Mike Pence, President Donald Trump, Defense Secretary Mark Esper, Chairman Mark Milley, and Brigadier General Marcus S. Evans observe the operation in the White House Situation Room, October 26, 2019

On October 26, 2019, shortly after U.S. president Donald Trump and a small team of key civilian and military leaders gathered in the White House Situation Room at around 5 p.m. EST (00:00 Syria time), U.S. Joint Special Operations Command's 1st SFOD-D (Delta Force) operators, along with U.S. Army Rangers from the 75th Ranger Regiment, departed Al Asad Airbase in Iraq. The operation used eight U.S. military helicopters, including MH-47 Chinooks and MH-60L/M Black Hawks, to conduct an air assault on an "isolated compound" 300 meters outside of Barisha village—located five kilometers (three miles) south of the border with Turkey in hostile rebel-held territory in Syria's Idlib Governorate—to kill or capture Baghdadi. The assault force reportedly flew through Turkish-controlled and Russian-monitored airspace towards the objective and landed after 70 minutes.

According to General McKenzie, who oversaw the operation, air cover for the assault included armed helicopters, multiple drones, and fighter aircraft providing close air support; they planned for multiple children/non-militants at the compound and tried to minimize casualties. As the heli-borne assault force approached Baghdadi's compound, the helicopters reportedly came under gunfire from two locations from non-IS militant groups that were outside the target building but in the area of operations; according to McKenzie, they were neutralized with two airstrikes from supporting helicopters. The Delta Force operators, supported by military working dogs and military robots, landed outside the compound and surrounded it, repeatedly calling on its occupants to come out peacefully in Arabic. "Those who came out of the building were checked for weapons and explosives and moved away," McKenzie said. "U.S. forces detained and later released the noncombatants. The group was treated humanely at all times, and included 11 children." Five IS members inside the compound—four women and one man—"presented a threat to the force" and were killed when they did not respond to commands to surrender, as they were suspected of wearing suicide vests. Believing the main entrance to be booby trapped, operators breached the compound's walls with explosives.

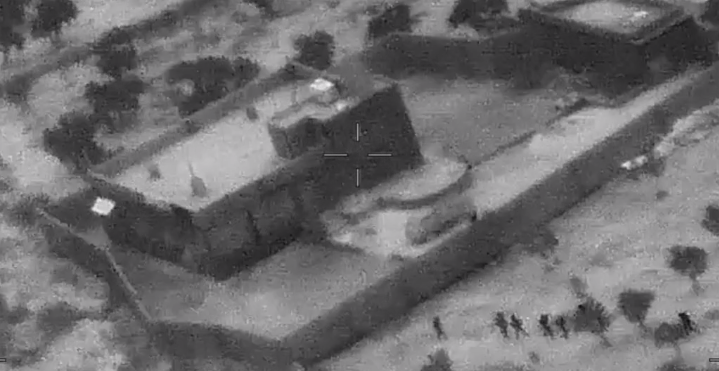
U.S. special operations personnel advancing on the target building

A UCAV bombards Baghdadi's compound following extraction of U.S. forces

Once Delta was inside the target building, Baghdadi fled into a tunnel network under the premises wearing a suicide vest and carrying two children with him. By the time he reached a dead end, an explosive ordnance disposal military robot and a dog (later identified as a male Belgian Malinois named "Conan") had been dispatched to subdue him. He detonated his vest, killing himself and the two children, and causing the tunnel to collapse. The children killed were believed to be younger than 12 years old. U.S. soldiers dug through the debris to retrieve some of Baghdadi's remains and lab technicians successfully conducted DNA profiling and biometrics tests within 15 minutes of his death via Defense Intelligence Agency analysis, confirming Baghdadi's identity. According to the White House, "a combination of visual evidence and DNA tests confirmed Baghdadi's identity." The quick DNA confirmation is attributed to special forces already possessing samples of Baghdadi's tissue, reportedly voluntarily provided by one of his daughters, according to a U.S. official. McKenzie, however, stated that they were obtained from his time in Camp Bucca.

Two adult male captives and a "substantial" amount of documents and electronic items were seized from the compound during the raid which, per U.S. officials, was a primary goal so they could understand the current leadership structure of ISIL. Items included 5–6 cellphones, 2–4 laptops and some USB flash drives. Just before 3:30 am Syrian time, U.S. helicopters departed the area for Iraq and the compound was then destroyed by airstrikes from overhead F-15 jets and MQ-9 Reaper drones, reportedly to prevent the site from becoming a "shrine" for sympathizers. According to Chairman of the Joint Chiefs of Staff Mark Milley, a wide variety of munitions, including AGM-158 JASSM cruise missiles, unspecified precision-guided bombs, and AGM-114 Hellfire guided missiles were responsible for leveling Baghdadi's compound.

McKenzie, who called the operation "exquisitely planned and executed," stated that the special forces who took part in the operation were based in Syria and that only U.S. personnel were involved in the raid on the compound itself. The entire operation lasted roughly two hours.

== Aftermath ==
General McKenzie called in and announced the mission's success to the team in the White House Situation Room, saying "Got him, 100 percent confidence, jackpot, over," according to National Security Advisor Robert O'Brien.

=== Trump press conference ===
Trump announces the raid to the press in the White House Diplomatic Reception Room on October 27, 2019.

At 9:23 p.m. EST, President Trump tweeted "Something very big has just happened!" with the White House subsequently announcing a planned press conference at 9 a.m. the next morning. At the press conference, Trump announced Baghdadi's death and went on to describe the successful operation against him in detail, reporting that U.S. forces used helicopters, jets, and drones through airspace controlled by Russia and Turkey.

He also said that they had Baghdadi "under surveillance for 'a couple of weeks' and 'two or three' raids had been canceled because of his movements". He continued: "The forces targeted the compound using eight helicopters, which were met with hostile fire. The commandos entered the building by blowing holes in the wall, avoiding the main door which was booby-trapped." Trump elaborated on the entrance to the building during a followup question:

And they did a lot of shooting, and they did a lot of blasting, even not going through the front door. You know, you would think you go through the door. If you're a normal person, you say, "Knock, knock. May I come in?" The fact is that they blasted their way into the house and a very heavy wall, and it took them literally seconds. By the time those things went off, they had a beautiful, big hole, and they ran in and they got everybody by surprise.

Trump announced that Baghdadi died by detonating a suicide vest after he was chased by U.S. military dogs and was cornered inside a tunnel. He and other officials initially stated that the explosion killed three of his children alongside him, however General McKenzie later said it had been confirmed only two were killed. Trump said Baghdadi died "like a dog and a coward" and "whimpering and crying and screaming", but JCS Chairman Milley and various Pentagon and administration officials either could not confirm, or outright denied, the "whimpering and crying and screaming" detail as Trump reportedly had only seen drone surveillance without live audio.

Reportedly, some U.S. officials said that Trump's press conference contained several pieces of information that were inaccurate, highly classified, or tactically sensitive.

Trump reportedly met with troops involved in the raid during a visit to Fort Bragg, North Carolina, on October 29, 2020. According to White House press secretary Kayleigh McEnany, Trump presented the operators with a Presidential Unit Citation and visited a Special Forces memorial at the base.

=== Casualties ===
JCS Chairman Milley said during a Pentagon briefing that the disposal of Baghdadi's corpse was "handled appropriately", initially adding that Washington had no plans to release images of his death, but later showed footage of the raid during a briefing on October 30. Baghdadi was buried at sea and afforded Islamic rites, three anonymous U.S. officials told Reuters and a Pentagon source told AFP. An aide of Baghdadi, who handled logistics, was the other man killed according to Iraqi officials. United States Secretary of State Mike Pompeo said that two wives of al-Baghdadi were also killed in the raid.

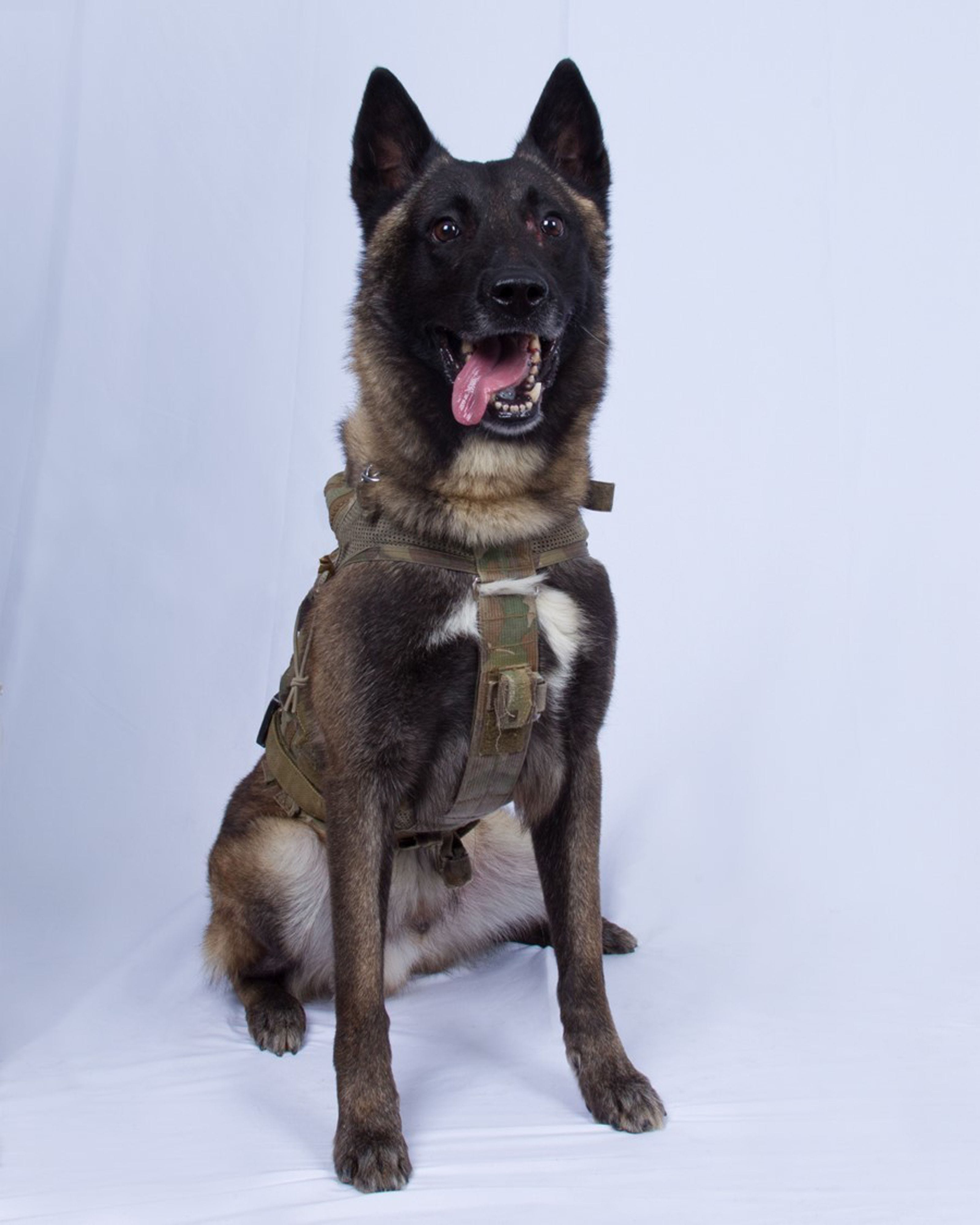
Conan, the American Special Operations Military Working Dog that chased after Baghdadi

Trump said no U.S. soldiers were injured, but Secretary of Defense Mark Esper said two had been lightly injured during the raid. An American Special Operations Military Working Dog (SOMWD), a male Belgian Malinois named Conan, who chased Baghdadi, was treated for his injuries and returned to work on October 28. During a news conference that day, Esper and Milley declined to identify him for security reasons; Trump released a declassified photograph of him later in the day. The dog was injured due to live electrical cables that were exposed, according to McKenzie.

According to the Syrian Observatory for Human Rights (SOHR) war monitor, nine people, including one child, two women, and some high-ranking IS leaders, died in the operation. Baghdadi's suicide vest killed two more children, reportedly his own. American forces captured two militants and rescued eleven children. General McKenzie said six IS members, which included four women and another man aside from Baghdadi, were killed in the operation. The raid also killed about 10 to 15 members of other groups who engaged American forces.

Delta also killed a local Hurras al-Din commander, identified as Abu Muhammad al-Halabi, the owner of the house Baghdadi was staying at. An Iraqi intelligence official and Hisham al-Hashimi have stated to The Independent that Halabi was also a smuggler, which is why the IS head and his family utilized his services. According to Der Spiegel, Baghdadi's host was Salam Haj Deen an IS sympathizer. The inhabitants of the village stated that he was a sheep seller, but rarely interacted with his neighbors. His other alias is believed to be Abu Mohammed Salama and his corpse was flown away by Delta Force after the raid according to Barisha's inhabitants. He, along with some other Hurras al-Din members, is also suspected to have been part of a pro-IS faction.

Based on a receipt book of ISIL found by associates of former American intelligence official Asaad Almohammad, analysts have stated that Baghdadi was paying the members of the group in exchange for hiding him. According to the receipt book, IS paid at least $67,000 to them from early 2017 to mid-2018, including $7,000 in summer 2018 to prepare bases for IS fighters from "al-Khair province", hinting that they helped in smuggling IS members. Aymenn Jawad Al-Tamimi pointed to the fact that the two groups were enemies, citing a warning by Hurras al-Din to its members in February 2019 to avoid contact with IS and the latter issuing the similar statement about the former in July. However, Tamimi also said that some of the receipts might be fabrications, except the ones from March to July 2018 that he was shown.

==== Civilian casualties ====
U.S. helicopters engage hostile targets in support of ground forces near Baghdadi's compound, October 26, 2019. Excluding the two children killed due to Baghdadi's suicide, the U.S. military initially said there were no civilian casualties during the operation.

Besides the two children killed by Baghdadi's suicide detonation, the U.S. military initially reported no civilian casualties during the operation.

A report by NPR released on December 3, 2019, cited a local farmer, Barakat Ahmad Barakat, as saying that his right hand and forearm were blown off and his two friends were killed by U.S. helicopter fire during the operation. According to Barakat's account, Khaled Mustafa Qurmo and Khaled Abdel Majid Qurmo, two cousins, were driving him home in Barisha on October 26 when helicopters fired on their white van. All three exited the vehicle, but one fell, his legs filled with shrapnel. A follow-up strike targeted the group again, killing the two cousins and blowing off a chunk of Barakat's right arm. The cousins died of shrapnel wounds to the chest, according to autopsy reports by a Syrian doctor with the Union of Medical Care and Relief Organizations, an international medical group. Several relatives said the cousins operated a van service and had no connection to IS or any armed group; Barakat said the van carried no weapons. Relatives provided video and photos of the scene and the destroyed van to NPR.

An unidentified U.S. defense official told NPR by email that it was the first civilian casualty report they received related to the raid, and that initial reports suggested that a white van in the vicinity had fired on U.S. helicopters. "Surveillance footage will be reviewed to determine if an investigation needs to be opened based upon this additional information," the official said. Former Pentagon intelligence analyst Marc Garlasco suggested the shrapnel damage at the scene resembled that caused by Hydra 70 rockets, a type used by U.S. military helicopters. Garlasco also suggested the secondary strikes on the men fleeing the van was consistent with a U.S. military practice of targeting "squirters"—people perceived to be hostiles running away from an attack.

In February 2020, U.S. Central Command launched a formal investigation, called a credibility assessment, into the allegations of possible civilian casualties. In July 2020, Central Command concluded that U.S. forces reacted appropriately to "actions against U.S. forces, which turned lethal after warnings were not heeded." According to CENTCOM, a helicopter fired a warning shot at the approaching van, but the van accelerated towards the helicopter until it was shot upon again, in which the men fled towards Baghdadi's compound without appearing to surrender, leading U.S. forces to perceive the men as hostile "enemy combatants". The men would not have been considered hostile if they did not run towards the compound, a spokesman said. CENTCOM investigators did not contact Barakat during the assessment and said they will not compensate the victims' families.

Retired U.S. Major General Dana Pittard commented that U.S. personnel were justified in protecting themselves against a Syrian vehicle approaching the area with unknown intentions, but said the cousins' response to the warning shot was also understandable, saying "I assume it was dark...What is your inclination? Just put your foot on the pedal and keep going." NPR questioned the military's account, saying it offered no evidence the men intended to threaten troops and speculated whether the military was deliberately portraying confused, fleeing civilians as retreating hostiles.

On December 8, 2021, NPR filed a lawsuit in the Southern District of New York against the U.S. Department of Defense, alleging that the Pentagon failed its legal obligation to provide documents of the investigation and respond to Freedom of Information Act requests in a timely manner. It obtained a redacted copy of the report of the Department of Defense in July 2023, verifying that the two people killed near the van during the raid were civilians and the U.S. military only fired warning shots seconds before targeting it.

== Analysis ==
An analysis by the Brookings Institution released on November 6, 2019, portrayed the raid's success as a reminder of the United States' "power and resolve" in the war on terror, remarking on three particular aspects of the operation: intelligence collection, international cooperation, and operational capability. Brookings asserted that it was a combination of U.S. hard power and soft power that secured cooperation with Turkey, Russia, Iraq and the Kurds and noted that a synergized combination of HUMINT, SIGINT, and visual intelligence gathering was the key to translating the IS informant's information into actionable operational intelligence, such as how the deployment of military dogs indicated U.S. forces were expecting close-quarters obstacles thanks to intelligence reports. The analysis stated that despite Baghdadi's eight years of experience evading capture or death, the operation succeeded due to the U.S. professionally utilizing the "Find, Fix, Finish" intelligence cycle standard: narrow down Baghdadi's suspected location (the Find), verify his identity and location and translate the intelligence into a feasible action plan (the Fix), and subdue the target (the Finish).

A Department of Defense Inspector General report on November 19, 2019, citing Defense Intelligence Agency assessments, stated that Baghdadi's death was "a significant blow to ISIS but would not likely end the ISIS threat" and that his demise "would likely have little effect on the ability of ISIS to reconstitute" itself as a potent transnational threat, according to open-source analysis. A report from the DIA in 2020 concluded that Baghdadi's death did not have an immediate impact on IS's abilities to operate, as the group's command structure was fairly decentralized by the time of the raid.

== Reactions ==
Statement by SDF spokesman Redur Khalil on Baghdadi's death

The Kurdish-led Syrian Democratic Forces said the raid was the outcome of intelligence sharing between parties on the ground and thanked those involved in the operation.

=== IS response and subsequent operations ===
News of the death of Baghdadi was ignored by official Islamic State channels for days and the group did not immediately confirm his death. Many IS supporters refused to believe he was dead, while some others accepted it. Supporters of IS's rival jihadist groups like Hayat Tahrir al-Sham and al-Qaeda praised his death because of his group's noted record for cruelty. Salafi cleric Abdullah al-Muhaysini celebrated Baghdadi's demise and called on IS members to defect. The activity of jihadist supporters in general temporarily decreased online as well.

IS's Amaq News Agency confirmed Baghdadi's death on October 31 and announced Abu Ibrahim al-Hashimi al-Qurashi as his successor. Abu Hamza al-Qurashi became their new spokesman after its prior spokesperson, Abul-Hasan al-Muhajir, was killed in an October 27 U.S. strike in northwest Syria following the Barisha raid. In an audio message, Hamza al-Qurashi described U.S. president Donald Trump as "a crazy old man" and warned the U.S. to "not rejoice" and that IS supporters would avenge Baghdadi's death.

Since Baghdadi's death several of the leaders operating under him have been killed or captured, along with some of his family members:

On November 4, Turkish communications director Fahrettin Altun stated that Rasmiya Awad, Baghdadi's lesser-known older sister, had been captured. According to Reuters, citing Turkish officials, Awad was captured in a raid on a shipping container in the Turkish-controlled Syrian border town of Azaz and that Turkish authorities were interrogating her husband and daughter-in-law who were also detained. When captured, she was also accompanied by five children. "We hope to gather a trove of intelligence from Baghdadi's sister on the inner workings of ISIS," Altun stated. Little independent information is available on Baghdadi's sister and Reuters was not immediately able to verify if the captured individual was her.

On December 3, Iraqi security forces announced the capture of Baghdadi's "deputy" who operated under the name "Abu Khaldoun". According to security officials, a police unit in Hawija, Kirkuk Governorate, Iraq, tracked down Khaldoun to an apartment in the March 1 area where he was hiding; he possessed a fake I.D. under the name of Shaalan Obeid when apprehended. Khaldoun was previously IS's "military prince" of Iraq's Saladin Governorate.

On December 26, ISWAP, the West African branch of IS, killed 11 captives in what the group called a "message for Christians" and a retaliation for the killing of Baghdadi and Abul-Hasan al-Muhajir.

=== International ===
Representatives of several countries, including Australia, France, Israel, and the United Kingdom, congratulated the United States and said that the death of Baghdadi marked a turning point in the fight against IS.

- Afghanistan: Afghanistan praised al-Baghdadi's killing as a significant blow and anticipated it would weaken IS's activities in Afghanistan.
- Bahrain: Bahrain lauded the raid and said it was a "fatal blow to the group."
- China: China said the death of al-Baghdadi is important progress, but the world should not rest on its laurels in the fight against terrorism.
- Egypt: Egypt said the death marked a significant achievement in the efforts to combat extremism. The country also advocated for a comprehensive approach that acknowledged the security, developmental, and theoretical dimensions in the battle against armed actors.
- European Union: The European Union said the death of al-Baghdadi was a major blow to the organization but warned that it still remains a major threat.
- France: The French government said that it was a hard blow to the Islamic State however, saying, that this was also just a stage and that the fight must continue.
- Germany: The German government took the time to reflect on the victims of IS after the raid. Government spokesman Steffen Seibert said al-Baghdadi can't order any more killings, but added that the fight against the organization will continue.
- Iran: Iran stated that al-Baghdadi's death was not significant and that the actions of the United States are responsible for the rise of IS. Iran said that the killing of Baghdadi did not mean the group's end, as sectarianism and terrorism still very much exist and are being exploited by countries like the U.S.
- Iraq: Iraq noted its part in locating al-Baghdadi and said it would continue to track and prosecute the organization.
- Israel: The State of Israel welcomed the death of al-Baghdadi, congratulating President Trump and reaffirming their stand on international terrorism and stating that the fight must continue on.
- Japan: Japan said the death of al-Baghdadi was a crucial turning point towards serenity and stability in the Middle East. However, the country also cautioned that the war against terrorism had not ended.
- Jordan: Jordan characterized al-Baghdadi's death as a major step in the battle against terrorists and their principles of hate. The country also said it will remain on the frontlines to eradicate extremism in partnership with its allies.
- NATO: NATO chief Jens Stoltenberg stated the raid was a great accomplishment in the efforts against global terrorism.
- Philippines: The Philippines said al-Baghdadi's death was only a temporary setback for the group because of IS's comprehensiveness and reach worldwide.
- Russia: Russian spokesman Dmitry Peskov said the raid's result, if confirmed, represented a serious contribution by the United States toward combating terrorism.
- Saudi Arabia: Mohammed bin Salman commended Trump on the killing of Abu Bakr al-Baghdadi, describing the event as a turning point in the fight against extremism. Saudi Arabia said Baghdadi had perverted the reputation of Islam and welcomed his death at the hands of US commandos. The kingdom said it is thankful to the US for its efforts to track members of this terrorist organization.
- Sri Lanka: The prime minister of Sri Lanka, Ranil Wickremesinghe congratulated President Donald Trump after the raid. He said that IS has been fomenting horror and dismay across the globe and that the operation makes the world a more secure place.
- Syria: In an interview with the French magazine Paris Match published on November 27, 2019, Syrian President Bashar al-Assad dismissed any suggestion the Syrian government had anything to do with the raid and affirmed his skepticism of the operation's success, calling it a "fantastic play staged by the Americans" and quipping, "was al-Baghdadi really killed or not?" Assad made similar remarks to Syria TV weeks prior, calling the operation "little more than a trick" and likening U.S. politics to Hollywood.
- Turkey: President Recep Tayyip Erdoğan said al-Baghdadi's killing was a turning point in the fight against terrorism.
- United Kingdom: The Foreign Secretary Dominic Raab said that the death of al-Baghdadi was a "significant milestone"; however, it was not the end of the threat with the UK Secretary of State for Defence Penny Mordaunt welcoming the death of al-Baghdadi.
- United Nations: U.N. Secretary-General António Guterres said the death of al-Baghdadi was a good time to remember the casualties of terrorism. U.N. deputy spokesman Farhan Haq said that IS had perpetrated wicked human rights violations and ushered in disaster and death to thousands of men, women, and children. Lastly, he added the world has made visible progress against IS.

== See also ==
- Assassination of Qasem Soleimani, targeted killing of Iranian Major General Qasem Soleimani in 2020.
- Battle of Baghuz Fawqani
- Death of Abu Ibrahim al-Hashimi al-Qurashi (2022)
- Killing of Osama bin Laden, similar raid that targeted al-Qaeda leader Osama bin Laden in 2011.
- List of United States special forces raids during the Syrian civil war
- Rojava–Islamist conflict
- Turkey–IS conflict
- Foreign policy of the first Trump administration
