= Dawa FFM =

Dawa FFM was an Islamist Salafi organisation based in Frankfurt, Germany that was founded in 2008. The most prominent preacher of the group was Abdellatif Rouali, who was under investigation by German authorities for recruitment of jihadists.

In June 2012, German police conducted a major raid against apartments and offices linked to the group along with other Salafi groups Millatu Ibrahim and Die Wahre Religion. After having been under investigation for years, Dawa FFM was banned in March 2013 and subsequently again raided by police.

Among the group's followers were Arid Uka, the perpetrator of the 2011 Frankfurt Airport shooting. The group has also been linked to Halil D., the suspected perpetrator behind a foiled terror bombing plot against a Frankfurt cycling race in May 2015.
