= Lizzie Phelan =

British war correspondent

- Born: Elizabeth Cocker c. 1986 (age 39–40)
- Occupation: Journalist
- Employer: redfish (Ruptly)
- Organization: redfish

Lizzie Phelan is a British war correspondent who is the managing director of redfish GmbH, a Berlin-based media company owned by Ruptly that focuses on creating short documentaries. Phelan was formerly employed as a reporter by RT, and specialises in reporting as a war correspondent, having reported on the First Libyan Civil War, the Syrian Civil War, and war on the Islamic State of Iraq and the Levant.

== Personal ==
Elizabeth Cocker took the name Phelan from her Irish grandmother and uses it for her professional work. Her great-grandfather was William Phelan, who was a member of the Irish Citizen Army. She did a postgraduate study in journalism. She is married to German journalist Hüseyin Doğru.

== Career ==
She first worked for the Daily Mail for experience before leaving after a few months for the Morning Star, under the byline Lizzie Cocker. Later she changed her byline to Lizzie Phelan. Lizzie Phelan is a freelance journalist, and her work has appeared in RT (formerly Russia Today) and the Iranian news network Press TV. In 2013, she was head of the newsroom at RT's Ruptly.tv, and worked later as RT's correspondent in Damascus, Syria.

=== Reporting from Libya ===
She was among the western journalists held captive by pro-Qaddafi forces during the siege of the Rixos hotel in the hours prior to the fall of Tripoli.

=== British regulatory response to reporting ===
In September 2012, UK broadcast regulator Ofcom, found that two Libyan dispatches broadcast by Phelan on RT in August 2011 were in breach of its code on accuracy and impartiality.

The channel responded to Ofcom's allegations insisting that "subsequent developments of the situation in Libya did however confirm", in their opinion "that Lizzie Phelan was correct in her assertions", referring to reports of civilian casualties by opposition and NATO forces by Amnesty International and the International Rescue Committee.

Ofcom ended the availability of Press TV in the United Kingdom in January 2012 because its licence was being controlled from Iran instead of from the UK. Phelan has worked for Press TV as a correspondent in Libya and then in Nicaragua. The Guardian said her Libyan reporting was "controversial".
