= Al Aan TV =

Satellite TV channel based in Dubai, United Arab Emirates

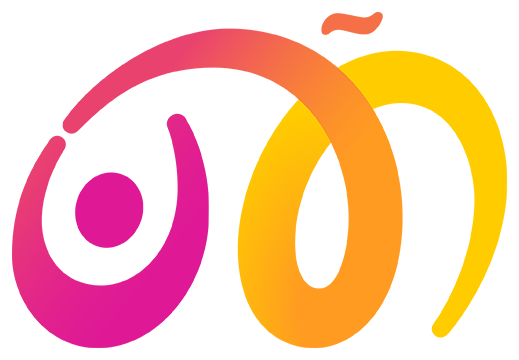
- Country: UAE
- Broadcast area: Pan-Arab Region
- Headquarters: Dubai, United Arab Emirates

Programming
- Language: Arabic
- Picture format: 576p (SDTV); 1080i (HDTV)

Ownership
- Owner: Tower Media Middle East

History
- Launched: 2006; 20 years ago
- Closed: June 29, 2026

Links
- Website: www.alaan.tv

Al Aan or Alaan TV (Arabic: تلفزيون الآن) was a pan-Arab infotainment satellite television station based in Dubai Media City, United Arab Emirates.

== History and profile ==
Al Aan broadcast from Dubai Media City.

Al Aan TV was free-to-air at Arabsat and Nilesat, mobile phones, radio and smartphone applications.

In 2019–2020, Jenan Moussa, a reporter covering the Syrian Civil War for Al Aan TV, published pictures obtained from the phone of Omaima Abdi, a female Islamic State member and the widow of Denis Cuspert. The pictures showed Abdi alongside her husband and holding a gun. She had since returned to Germany and was living freely in Hamburg. As a result of Moussa's reporting, Omaima Abdi was sentenced to three years and six months imprisonment in Germany.

The channel came into the spotlight when it aired a rare video of a woman being stoned to death by Taliban in Orakzai Agency, Pakistan.

Al Aan TV was the only TV station in the world to film and report the funeral of former Libyan leader Muammar Gaddafi after he died in the 2011 Libyan civil war.

Throughout 2025, Al Aan TV gradually scaled down its operations, moving to a fully digital operation. The channel's website announced that Al Aan TV "concluded" its operations as of 29 June 2026.

== Akhbar Al Aan ==
Al Aan presented a set of news programs, covering the Arab and international news, around the clock, including: reports, opinions and analysis of experts, culture, sport, economy and communities’ affairs in addition to special segments for journalism to reveal local issues and serious cases.

Al Aan TV had a network of reporters distributed around the Arab World, among them is the reporter and journalist Jenan Moussa.

== Logos ==
The old logo was replaced with the new one on 1 October 2021:

- New logo:
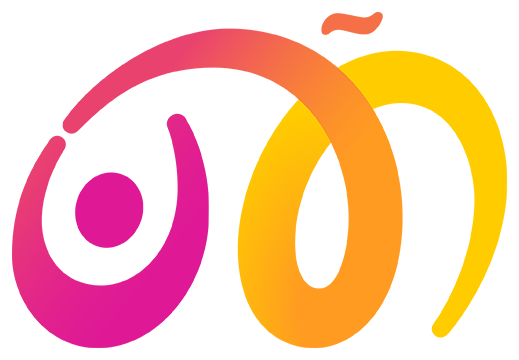
  Al Aan TV new Logo
- Old logo:
  Al Aan TV old logo

== See also ==
- Television in the United Arab Emirates
- Mass media in the United Arab Emirates
