= Hüseyin Doğru =

German-Turkish journalist

- Born: 28 May 1983 (age 43); Frankfurt am Main, Germany
- Occupations: Journalist and documentary filmmaker
- Known for: Founder of Red Media, sanctioned by the European Union in 2025
- Spouse: Lizzie Phelan
- Children: 3

Hüseyin Doğru (born 28 May 1983 in Frankfurt am Main) is a German journalist and documentary filmmaker based in Berlin. In 2023, he founded Red Media. In May 2025, he and his company AFA Medya A.Ş. were included on the European Union sanctions list in relation to activities that, according to the Council of the European Union, were linked to influence operations and information interference aligned with the interests of the Russian state. The EU has not presented any evidence of links between Doğru and Russia. Nor is it required to do so to adopt sanctions.

The German government, and German media such as taz and Deutsche Welle have reported about connections between Red Media, AFA Medya and Russian media RT and Ruptly. Tagesspiegel also accused Doğru of collusion with pro-Palestinian activists who occupied Humboldt University in Berlin. Doğru has rejected these accusations and stated that the sanctions are a punishment for his journalistic coverage of the war in Gaza, as well as the Palestinian genocide there.

Ninon Colneric, former judge of the European Court of Justice, law scholar Alina Miron and Doğru said the European sanctions have resulted in civil death, as they prohibit him from working, travelling, receiving money or gifts, and making any purchases or payments, not even to a lawyer or for renting a home. Red Media closed on 16 May 2025. All Doğru's bank accounts were frozen—as were, at times, those of his wife and, most recently, even his mother.

He is married to the British journalist Lizzie Phelan, they have three children.

== Accusations and sanctions ==
Red Media was an English-language media platform founded by Hüseyin Doğru and managed through AFA Medya A.Ş., a company owned by Doğru himself. It operated under the domain https://thered.stream/. Red saw itself as an independent left-wing media outlet.

According to the German newspaper Tageszeitung, the platform was developed from the digital infrastructure of Redfish, which had been financed through Ruptly, a news and video agency linked to RT. Following Russia's invasion of Ukraine in 2022 and the imposition by the European Union of restrictions and sanctions against media linked to the Russian state, Redfish ceased operations.

In July 2024, Doğru was accused by the Tagesspiegel newspaper of having colluded with the pro-Palestinian activists who occupied the Institute of Social Sciences at Humboldt University of Berlin to be the first to report on the event in May 2024 , and of belonging to a "Russian propaganda network".

The Council of the European Union stated in 2025 that the platform maintained "close financial and organizational connections with Russian state propaganda entities and actors" and disseminated "the narratives of radical Islamic terrorist groups such as Hamas", and therefore sanctioned both Doğru and AFA Medya within the framework of its "restrictive measures in view of Russia's destabilising activities." The Council did not provide any evidence, nor did it accuse Doğru of any crime.

Doğru said that the sanction is punishment for writing articles defending the Palestinian viewpoint during the Gaza war, and that Red Media was not funded by the Russian state or other governments.

According to the Frankfurter Allgemeine Zeitung, the EU has not (as of June 2026) presented evidence of links between Doğru and Russia. According to Doğru’s lawyer, Alexander Górski, the evidentiary documents submitted by the EU upon request consisted exclusively of publicly accessible statements made by Doğru, such as those on social media. The EU failed to demonstrate any concrete links to Russia, such as through financial transactions or emails.

== Consequences ==
Doğru is prohibited from working, traveling, receiving money or gifts (aside from given an allowance of up to €506 which was exempt under EU Sanctions), and making any purchases or payments, not even to a lawyer or for renting a home. Red Media shut down on 16 May 2025. In March 2026, the bank accounts of Doğru's wife were also frozen by the German government, arguing that she had taken out insurance for the family car after her husband's policy was cancelled.

Ninon Colneric, former judge of the European Court of Justice, and law scholar Alina Miron stated before the European Parliament that the sanctions against Doğru, adopted without trial and without the accused being able to defend himself, effectively amount to civil death and constitute a serious infringement of his fundamental rights.

On February 19, 2026, Doğru received solidarity from Francesca Albanese, who was also subject to harsh sanctions, in her case by the United States. Albanese criticized the EU Council for "crushing fundamental freedoms/human dignity to protect a genocidal state." The following month, BSW politician Sevim Dağdelen called for a broad mobilization in support of Doğru.

== See also ==
- Francesca Albanese
- Karim Khan
- Jacques Baud
