= Viory =

- Darpo Vision FZ LLC
- Formation: November 2023
- Founded at: Abu Dhabi, United Arab Emirates
- Type: Video news agency
- Legal status: Free-zone company
- Headquarters: Abu Dhabi, United Arab Emirates
- Region served: Worldwide
- Products: Raw video news footage, live streams, video archive
- Services: Video news production, live coverage, fact-checking and verification, translation and subtitling
- Official language: English, Arabic
- Owner: Darpo Vision FZ LLC
- Staff: 150+ (2023)
- Website: viory.video
- Remarks: Describes itself as "the video news agency of the Global South"

Viory is a video news agency headquartered in Abu Dhabi, United Arab Emirates, which describes itself as "the video news agency of the Global South". It supplies raw news footage, live streams and archive material to broadcasters and other media clients. Its legal entity is Darpo Vision FZ LLC, registered in an Abu Dhabi free zone. Several investigations by journalists and open-source researchers have alleged that Viory is a successor to Ruptly, the Berlin-based video agency formerly owned by the Russian state-funded broadcaster RT; Viory has denied any such connection.

== History ==
Viory formally launched on 14–15 November 2023 at the Global Media Congress in Abu Dhabi, presenting Abu Dhabi as its first international hub. At launch the company said it had more than 150 full-time staff, a network of over 3,000 video journalists, an archive of more than 150,000 video packages, and an output of about 50 video packages daily plus roughly 300 hours of live content per month, with staff speaking more than 38 languages. The agency said it would cover politics, technology, sports and entertainment, and would serve clients ranging from international media groups to regional outlets and individual citizen journalists.

At the same event, a representative of Viory signed a cooperation agreement with the Union of News Agencies of the Organisation of Islamic Cooperation.

In December 2025 Viory organised the inaugural Global South Video News Awards at the BRIDGE Summit in Abu Dhabi, with the Emirates News Agency (WAM), TRENDS Research & Advisory, Abu Dhabi University and the University of Sharjah named as UAE partners.

== Operations ==
According to the company's own description, Viory's main product is verified raw video footage gathered by a network of freelance video journalists. It reports publishing more than 60 news videos a day, streaming over 440 hours of live events per month, and maintaining an archive of more than 180,000 video packages. Other listed services include fact-checking and verification, multi-camera production, translation and subtitling. Novaya Gazeta Europe reported that, unlike Ruptly, Viory operates only in English and Arabic.

== Alleged links to Ruptly and RT ==
Ruptly was a Berlin-based video agency owned by RT's parent organisation, TV-Novosti. Following European Union sanctions on Russian state media after the 2022 invasion of Ukraine, Ruptly's German entity went into liquidation.

Reporting from several outlets has linked Viory to Ruptly:

- German media, including Der Tagesspiegel and RND, reported that Ruptly's former managing director, Dinara Toktosunova, was associated with the new venture, and that another former Ruptly executive, Ekaterina Mavrenkova, signed Viory's agreement with the OIC news agencies' union. The Tagesspiegel reported that neither Viory nor Ruptly could be reached for comment.
- A 2025 investigation by the group OSINT for Ukraine used social media and LinkedIn analysis to identify numerous former Ruptly employees working for Viory, and noted that Mavrenkova was listed as Viory's "Director of Content" at the 2024 Kazan Forum.
- A June 2026 Bellingcat investigation reported technical overlaps between the two organisations' web infrastructure, including a shared IP address, a security certificate registered to Ruptly, Ruptly sites sending performance data to a Viory-hosted project, and a Viory domain registered in December 2022 via a Russian registrar with a Moscow phone number. It concluded that the evidence pointed to a structural entanglement intended to bypass sanctions.

Bellingcat reports that both Viory and Ruptly have formally denied any operational or structural connection.

== See also ==
- Ruptly
- RT (TV network)
- Reuters
- Associated Press
- Media of the United Arab Emirates
