= Daniela Greene =

German-raised American woman (born 1980)

- Born: 1980 (age 45–46); Czechoslovakia
- Occupation: Translator
- Spouse(s): Matthew Greene; Denis Cuspert

Daniela Greene (born 1980) is an American translator and linguist. Born in Czechoslovakia, she was raised in Germany and became an American citizen after marrying a US Armed Services member. She earned her bachelor's degree in Oklahoma and a master's degree in history from Clemson University in 2008. In 2011, she joined the Federal Bureau of Investigation as a contract linguist with the help of her thesis supervisor, Alan Grubb. Greene was assigned to communicate with Denis Cuspert, an Islamic State member, during a covert FBI investigation in 2014. However, she secretly used an additional Skype account to communicate with Cuspert and traveled to ISIL-occupied Syria, where they married and she became a ISIL bride.

Within weeks of arriving in Syria, Greene came to regret her actions and managed to return to the US, where she was arrested and pleaded guilty. After cooperating with authorities, she received a lighter sentence than other similar cases and served two years in prison. Following her release, she moved to Syracuse, New York, and found employment at a hotel. In 2019, Greene was compared to Hoda Muthana, an Alabama widow who married a Jihadi fighter but was determined to have never had US citizenship.

== Biography ==
Greene was born in Czechoslovakia but raised in Germany. She earned a bachelor's degree in Oklahoma, and a master's degree in history at Clemson University in 2008.

Alan Grubb, her thesis supervisor, described her as one of his best students. Several years after her graduation, he wrote letters of recommendation that helped her get a job as a contract linguist with the FBI in 2011.

In 2014, the FBI was conducting a covert investigation into Denis Cuspert. As part of that investigation, Greene was assigned to communicate with him over Skype.

Unknown to her FBI superiors, Greene used an additional Skype account to communicate with Cuspert. Greene told her FBI superiors she was going to use a vacation to visit relatives back in Germany, when in reality she had used her third, unauthorized Skype account to plan to meet Cuspert in ISIL-occupied Syria. She told her FBI supervisors that she was leaving for Germany on June 11, 2014, and would return to Detroit on July 4, but actually travelled to ISIL-territory via Turkey instead.

Greene married Cuspert in ISIL-occupied Syria. CNN reported that Greene realized she had made a mistake within weeks of her arrival and found a way to return to the US, knowing she would face arrest and imprisonment. Commentators do not know how she was able to escape ISIL when many other people were not able to escape.

Greene was arrested, cooperated, and pleaded guilty. CNN reported that her charge and sentence was considerably lighter than those of other Americans who had merely made unsuccessful attempts to travel to ISIL territory. CNN quoted speculation that prosecutors asked for a light sentence to reward her for her cooperation.

Greene was released after serving a two-year sentence and relocated to Syracuse, New York, where she found employment as a hostess at a hotel.

In 2019, when ISIL's last enclave was collapsing, Greene was compared to Hoda Muthana, an Alabama widow who had married a Jihadi fighter and then escaped to a refugee camp, and was determined to have never had US citizenship.
