= Anissa Naouai =

American journalist

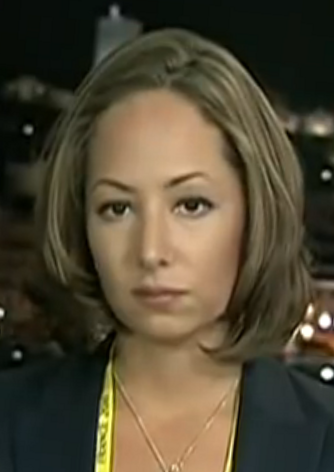
- Naouai in 2011
- Born: August 17, 1982 (age 44); New York City, U.S.
- Education: Hunter College; Moscow Art Theatre
- Occupation: Journalist
- Notable credit(s): In the Now; Maffick Media
- Children: 2

Anissa Naouai (born August 17, 1982) is an American journalist and former television presenter. She is the CEO of Maffick Media, a Berlin-based digital media company

== Early life ==
Naouai was born in New York City and is of Tunisian and German-American descent.

In 2000–2001, Naouai studied at Hunter College City University of New York. In 2001, at age 19, she entered the school-studio at Moscow Art Theatre (MAT), graduating in 2005. As a student she starred in performances as Bianca in The Taming of the Shrew (Shakespeare), Rose in The Rose Tattoo (Tennessee Williams), and Mom in True West (Sam Shepard).

== Career ==
=== Acting ===
Naouai was a member of the international theater company Studio 6 with the Moscow Art Theater. Naouai performed the audiobook The School for Scandal by Richard Brinsley Sheridan in English for Russian company ArdisBook.

=== Documentary filmmaking ===
She produced the documentary film Isklyuchitelism (Exceptionalism in English), which was shown on NTV. Zashto?, another work she co-produced, was awarded Best Documentary Film by Cubavision International.

=== Journalism ===
==== Russia Today ====
CNN reported that, according to her LinkedIn page, Naouai was a correspondent for RT from 2006, and a long-term friend of its Editor-in-Chief Margarita Simonyan. Naouai appeared on the program What's going on? on REN TV, anchored by Simonyan. From 2009, Naouai anchored the program In the Now for RT. The program brand has since expanded into a cross-channel digital platform that offers content via a variety of social media platforms (Facebook, Twitter, Instagram and YouTube).

On September 2, 2014, on her program In the Now, the general producer of the Ukraine Today channel Tetiana Pushnova accused RT of lying in her opening remarks before promptly leaving the interview, displaying the message "Russia Today Stop Lie." In an exchange with CNN's Christiane Amanpour, Naouai said RT's job was “closing the holes” in mainstream Western channels’ coverage, and said that the Kremlin funded it because Vladimir Putin “wants … Russia to be respected, mutually respected on an equal playing base, and he wants dialogue to prevail.”

In 2017, she told Christian Science Monitor, "I don't think I'm working for an adversary, despite some elements in the American media-political establishment trying to position RT as such... In fact, I think my work, and RT overall, helps improve public discourse in the US by completing the picture of current affairs and introducing diverse voices into the debate at large."

==== Maffick ====
Naouai was the chief executive officer of the Berlin-based media production company Maffick GmbH, which acquired In the Now in 2018. Maffick's majority shareholder was Ruptly, a subsidiary of the Russian RT network. Maffick Media's Facebook accounts were suspended in 2019 after investigations by CNN and T-online revealed ties to RT and Ruptly. Maffick was defended by RT, which said no official requests to explain the websites were filed with Maffick, and blamed CNN for the controversy, as well as by RT Editor-in-Chief Margarita Simonyan and Kremlin spokesman Dmitry Peskov. The pages were restored later that month after disclosing their ownership. For example, Soapbox's "About" section now read: "'Soapbox' is a political opinion brand of Maffick, which is owned and operated by Anissa Naouai and Ruptly GmbH, a subsidiary of RT". Naouai then founded Maffick LLC, incorporated in Summer 2019, after moving to Los Angeles and reincorporated its former channels in the new company. The disclosure about Russian state ownership was removed from Maffick's accounts after the new incorporation. In June 2020, Facebook labeled Maffick LLC's accounts "state-controlled" due to their connections to RT. The company sued Facebook in the Northern District of California in July 2020 for defamation and monetary damages from lost internet traffic. Maffick's case was dismissed after it was ruled that the company had not proven permanent damage and had largely not disputed Facebook's allegations. In July 2020, Twitter also started labelling Maffick content as “state-affiliated”; Naouai said she would contest this.

==== Resignation ====
On February 28, 2022, Naouai terminated Maffick's service agreement with RT and called for peace following the 2022 Russian invasion of Ukraine.

== Awards ==
New York Festivals finalist for Best News Analysis/Commentary for In the Now on RT (2016).

== Personal life ==
Naouai is married and has two children.
