= 2015 Eschborn-Frankfurt City Loop =

2015 UCI Europe Tour

Race details
- Dates: 1 May 2015
- Distance: 205 km (127 mi)

The 2015 Eschborn-Frankfurt City Loop (German: Rund um den Finanzplatz Eschborn-Frankfurt 2015) was scheduled to be the 54th edition of the Eschborn-Frankfurt City Loop semi-classic cycling race; it would have taken place on 1 May 2015. The race was cancelled the day before it was scheduled to take place because of a suspected terrorist plot similar to the Boston Marathon bombing.

== Planned event ==
The race was to have taken place on 1 May 2015 and was rated as a 1.HC event by the Union Cycliste Internationale (UCI). The planned route was 205 kilometres (127 miles) in length, starting in Eschborn and ending in Frankfurt; the course included several hills. The defending champion was Alexander Kristoff (Team Katusha). The favourites for victory included Kristoff and John Degenkolb (Team Giant–Alpecin), who had between them won Milan–San Remo, the Tour of Flanders and Paris–Roubaix.

=== Teams ===
22 teams were invited to take part in the race. Six of these were UCI WorldTeams; seven were UCI Professional Continental teams; eight were German UCI Continental teams; the last was a German national team.

UCI WorldTeams

- Team Katusha
- AG2R La Mondiale
- Team Giant–Alpecin
- Lotto–Soudal
- Team Sky
- IAM Cycling

UCI Professional Continental teams

- Team Roompot
- Bora–Argon 18
- Wanty–Groupe Gobert
- Cult Energy Pro Cycling
- Southeast Pro Cycling
- CCC–Sprandi–Polkowice
- Androni Giocattoli

UCI Continental teams

- LKT Team Brandenburg
- Team Stölting
- Bike Aid
- Team Kuota–Lotto
- Rad-Net Rose Team
- Team Stuttgart
- Team Heizomat
- MLP Team Bergstraße

National teams

- Germany

== Suspected terrorist plot and cancellation ==
On 30 April 2015, the day before the race was due to have taken place, local authorities announced that it had been cancelled due to "indications of a possible threat to the population". A couple, one of whom was described as a "suspected Islamic extremist", were arrested the previous day at their home in Oberursel, which is along the race route. The couple arrested were identified as Halil D., 35, a German citizen of Turkish origin, and Senay D., 34, thought to be a Turkish citizen.

Various items were found in their house, including a homemade pipe bomb, bomb-making materials, an automatic rifle, bazooka ammunition and a canister full of petrol. One of the couple had apparently bought hydrogen peroxide and alcohol at a hardware shop and had been seen exploring a forest along the race route. He had connections to Salafists in Frankfurt, including the group Dawa FFM. The German newspaper Die Welt suggested that he was involved with Al-Qaeda, specifically Al-Qaeda in the Islamic Maghreb (AQIM). According to German police the couple had also travelled to Spain to meet with members of Sharia4Spain. It has also been suggested that there may have been connections to Adem Yilmaz, one of those convicted as part of a bomb plot in 2007.

Security officials suggested that the couple may have been planning an attack similar to the Boston Marathon bombing in 2013. Halil D. was sentenced to two and a half years in prison in July 2016 for possession of illegal weapons and falsification of documents.
