= Musa Cerantonio =

Former Australian Muslim

Robert Cerantonio
- Born: 28 January 1985 (age 41); Australia
- Other name: Musa Cerantonio
- Known for: Australian jihadist preacher and ISIS supporter
- Children: 2
- Criminal charge: foreign incursion with the intent to engage in hostile activity
- Penalty: 7 years in prison

Robert "Musa" Cerantonio (born 28 January 1985) is a former ISIS propagandist who has been called perhaps "the most famous jihadist in Australia". Cerantonio converted to Islam in 2002, he became an Islamic preacher a few years later, then a supporter of the restoration of the caliphate, and of the Islamic State terrorist group. He has been arrested and deported once, and has been serving a prison sentence for trying to travel by boat from Australia to ISIS territory in the southern Philippines. He was due for release in May 2023.

== Early life ==
Cerantonio was born on 28 January 1985 in West Footscray, Melbourne, Australia to a Catholic family of six. He is of Italian and Irish heritage. He has described his upbringing as nominally Catholic. "We weren’t very practising, and whilst we were Catholic by name, we didn’t go to church except on Christmas or Easter, or when someone died or was getting married," he said.

He attended a Catholic primary school, and Footscray City College for secondary education. The College had an informal atmosphere and was "a very liberal school, influenced by the politics of socialism," according to Cerantonio. In 2000, at 15, he visited the Vatican. There, he began to question his belief, "I began to question the role of the Pope in the Catholic Church…and saw people praying to a dead body. There was idol worship at the home of my faith…and I felt in my heart that this was not right."

Cerantonio has two children from a marriage to "an Australian of Lebanese descent."

=== Conversion to Islam ===
In 2002, during the month of Ramadan and at age 17, Cerantonio converted to Islam. In 2005, he visited Medina in Saudi Arabia. Cerantonio later enrolled at Victoria University, Australia where he studied communications and history. While at the university he was President of the Islamic Society.

== Islamic activism ==
=== Early activity ===
He engaged in activism and preaching. In 2006, Cerantonio performed his first Hajj. As a convert to Islam he lectured at conferences in Australia, Italy, Germany, the Netherlands, India, Kuwait, Qatar, the UAE and the Philippines. He has authored dozens of articles on Islam. Journalist Graeme Wood, who has interviewed Cerantonio extensively, described him as a "neofundamentalist autodidact."

Cerantonio's religious interpretations differed in several respects from those of other Islamist preachers. He adhered to the Zahiri school of Islamic jurisprudence, considered music permissible under Islamic law, and opposed suicide bombings.

In 2011, Cerantonio was invited to Cairo, Egypt to become a televangelist by the Saudi-owned Iqraa satellite network. He presented the shows "Ask the Sheikh" and "Our Legacy". His TV presentations became "increasingly political" as he gravitated toward advocating "the establishment of a caliphate controlled by a single absolute leader and run strictly according to Sharia. He resigned from Iqraa after refusing to abandon preaching for the revival of the caliphate, and left Egypt in 2012.

=== Philippines 2012-June 2014 ===
According to Wood, Cerantonio's passion to establish the caliphate led him to the southern Philippines in 2013, where support for the idea was allegedly strong, and so it might be possible to establish a caliphate.

He fled to the Philippines and settled in Mindanao. While there, during fighting between the Philippine Army and the Moro National Liberation Front his apartment was bombed by warplanes. In February 2014, while in the Philippines, he lived with another convert to Islam, Joan Montayre, a 32 year old designer, in an apartment in the Cebu province.

An April 2014 report by the International Centre for the Study of Radicalization at King's College London, identified Cerantonio as one of the two most popular and influential clerics urging Muslims to immigrate to the Muslim lands and establish an Islamic state. Cerantonio's Facebook account had 12,000 followers when it was shut down in May 2014. He started began with translating speeches of various groups, including ISIS, into English around June 2014.

In mid-2014, Islamic State and Abu Bakr al-Baghdadi's declared the group had formed a new caliphate with al-Baghdadi as the new Caliph, and commanded all Muslims to pledge allegiance to al-Baghdadi and "make haste" to Syria to fight or help the jihad. While "ecstatic" over the announcement and urging his followers to obey the caliphate, (to the amusement of his critics), Cerantonio neither publicly pledged allegiance to al-Baghdadi nor traveled to Syria. Publicly swearing allegiance to al-Baghdadi was a violation of Australian law (Cerantonio agrees it is compulsory for Muslims to swear allegiance to someone who meets the qualifications for a caliph, and that al-Baghdadi meets those qualifications, but will not say if he has sworn allegiance to him); and according to Cerantonio, he and his partner had difficulty immigrating. In June 2014, a Facebook post on Cerantonio's account claimed he had arrived in Syria. Cerantonio says it was posted by another person in an attempt to throw the police off the search, and that he had not lied to his followers because another person had posted the claim.

Despite his efforts to stay offline and off the phone, in July 2014 Cerantonio was arrested in the central Philippines city of Lapu-Lapu for overstaying his visa and deported to Australia. Cerantonio claims he was denied access to a lawyer by Warden L’rev J. Del Cruz. "The warden was telling inmates not to talk to me because I was a terrorist,” he says. After two weeks in detention he was deported to Melbourne.

=== Australia May 2016 arrest - 'Tinnie plot' ===
In 2016, acting detective Sgt Adam Foley said that according to worldwide intelligence services Cerantonio was the second or third most influential jihadist preacher in the world.

In May 2016, Cerantonio was arrested in Queensland (along with four others) as the "ringleader" of a plot to flee the country in a boat, and for "making preparations for incursions into foreign countries to engage in hostile activities." The group planned to sail 3500 km to the southern Philippines, "overthrow" the government and "install Sharia Law". The members of the group planned to sail because they could not fly; they had all had their passports cancelled.

After his arrest Cerantonio was remanded in custody, with the trial delayed and expected in January 2018. The other four arrested were Paul Dacre, Anthony (Antonio) Granata, Kadir Kaya, and Shayden Thorne. Thorne is the brother of controversial Islamic preacher Junaid Thorne. A sixth man, Murat Kaya, brother of Kadir Kaya, was arrested separately at his Melbourne home. Police alleged that the group towed a seven-metre boat 3,100 kilometers from Melbourne, and had planned to travel by sea on it to West Papua, and finally to Syria, intending to join Islamic State. Later it was found they actually intended to stay in the southern Philippines allegedly to inspire Muslims to overthrow the government of the Southern Philippines.

Graeme Wood mused,

I tried to envision the improbable scene of five hairy mujahideen desperate not to look suspicious while hauling a deep sea fishing boat across the Outback. Did they want to get caught? After all they can now say they did what they could to reach the caliphate. And they will probably never have to leave Australia.

All those involved in the plot pled guilty and received prison sentences in February 2019. Thorne was sentenced to three years and ten months, but by then he had already served most of his minimum time. Dacre, Granata, and Kadir Kaya were each sentenced to four years in prison, three years non-parole period. Murat Kaya was sentenced to three years and eight months, two years and nine months non-parole.

== Criminal conviction ==
In May 2019, Cerantonio was sentenced to seven years in prison for his part in the 2016 plot. For his defense, his lawyer, Jarrod Williams, said that Musa "doesn’t always fit the profile of an Islamic extremist", as he enjoys music by the likes of AC/DC, Cold Chisel, Johnny Cash, Paul Simon and Rammstein.

In 2022, Cerantonio was alleged to have written to Graeme Wood from Port Phillip Prison and announced he had renounced both ISIS and Islam. He expressed regret for his support of ISIS and activity on their behalf, saying, "Seeing individuals dedicate themselves to tyrannical death cults led by suicidal maniacs is bad enough. Knowing that I may have contributed to their choices is terrible."

According to Wood, Cerantonio studied the Quran more closely while in prison, focusing on the account of Dhu'l-Qarnayn in its eighteenth chapter. Cerantonio reported noticing similarities with an Aramaic legend about Alexander the Great. After obtaining and translating the Aramaic text, he came to consider it more likely that the Quranic account drew on the legend than the reverse. He wrote to Wood: "Realizing that Dhu-l Qarnayn was not at all a real person but was rather based on a fictional account of Alexander the Great instantly left me with only one possible conclusion: The Quran was not divinely inspired"

=== Release ===
Murat Kaya was released under a control order in late January 2020, and Shayden Thorne in early March 2020 under an interim control order. In September 2021, the Murdoch-owned Herald Sun reported Cerantonio would soon be released from imprisonment but would be kept under surveillance. Unlike Kaya and Thorne, Cerantonio was ultimately released without any control orders.

== Bibliography ==
- Wood, Graeme (2017). "Musa Cerantonio". The Way of the Strangers : Encounters with the Islamic State. New York: Random House. pp. 88–139. ISBN 978-0-8129-8875-8.
