= Maffick =

American social media digital content company

Maffick LLC
- Industry: Digital media
- Predecessor: Maffick Media GmbH
- Founded: July 2019 in Los Angeles, California
- Founder: Anissa Naouai
- Headquarters: 2917 W Temple St. suite 102, Los Angeles, California
- Owner: Anissa Naouai
- Website: wearemaffick.com#home

Maffick LLC is a social media digital content company based in Los Angeles, California that has been labelled a Russian state-backed entity by Facebook, Twitter, TikTok and YouTube due to its connections to German-based Maffick Media GmbH, which was majority owned by RT (Russia Today) subsidiary Ruptly. In December 2021, Maffick LLC registered under the Foreign Agent Registration Act (FARA) as being financed by ANO TV-Novosti. It was incorporated in 2019, while its main channel is In the Now, launched in 2016.

On February 28, 2022, CEO Anissa Naouai terminated Maffick's service agreement with RT following the 2022 Russian invasion of Ukraine.

== Brands ==
According to CNN, Maffick "videos are generally critical of U.S. foreign policy and the mainstream American media, while largely avoiding criticism of the Russian government." Its content is targeted at American millennials.

The company operates three major channels: In the Now (ITN), Wasted-ED, and Soapbox. By mid-2018, In The Now had three million likes on Facebook; by mid-2020, it had five million followers. Maffick appears affiliated with a similar group, Maffick Moscow, which runs a Russian-language website and social media accounts.

Maffick launched a political podcast on Apple Podcast, Spotify, and Audible in October 2021, under the brand Maffick Podcasts, called Left Bitches (who are Right).

== History ==
=== In The Now ===
In The Now began as a programme on RT, fronted by Anissa Naouai, which became a stand-alone entity in June 2016. BuzzFeed News described it as "news served hot with a side of smile and a big dollop of propaganda". In The Now changed its Twitter handle from @InTheNowRT to @InTheNow_Tweet, but used the same IP address as RT.

NBC observed Maffick's content, for instance on the Syrian civil war, promoted pro-Russian geopolitical positions. Early viral hits included Canadian blogger Eva Bartlett defending the legitimacy of the 2014 Syrian presidential election, another attacking Syria's White Helmets civil defence volunteers, and one of Naouai describing messages from civilians in besieged Aleppo as "a coordinated PR campaign". Both videos were promoted by RT, Russian embassies, and then right-wing social media personalities, although RT stated that the platform was editorially independent from the main news channel.

According to the Atlantic Council's Digital Forensic Research Lab (DFRL), RT's parent company, ANO TV-Novosti, had registered In The Now's website. DFRL also reported that its audience in the US was concentrated among 18-24 year olds. The DFRL described the content as mostly non-ideological, but added that the 8% of content which was deemed ideological had a strong pro-Russian slant; the report alleged various inaccuracies in this content, such as the statement that NATO was involved in the Bosnian conflict to “surround Russia” or that Google censored anti-Hillary Clinton websites. In particular, the DFRL noted strong anti-Clinton bias in the 2016 U.S. presidential election coverage, including running several stories previously debunked by fact-checking website Snopes.

=== Maffick Media ===
Maffick Media GmbH was a Berlin-based subsidiary of Ruptly, which has been accused of being under editorial control of the Russian government. Maffick Media was 51% owned by Ruptly and 49% by Anissa Naouai. It shared an address in Berlin with Ruptly and with Redfish, another RT spin-off brand. It was originally set up as a holding company for In The Now. Maffick ran three other Facebook pages: Soapbox, focusing on current affairs, Waste-Ed, on environmental issues, and Backthen, a history channel. The three pages had over 30 million video views in the first months. From September 2018, it hired several contractors in Los Angeles.

In summer 2018, its video of Anna Dovgalyuk, a Russian social media star, campaigning against manspreading was watched by millions, but the European Union's EUvsDisinfo website alleged that it had been staged as a Kremlin propaganda operation, and it was removed by YouTube. EUvsDisinfo also accused the channel of promoting disinformation about the Douma chemical attack, including the screening of an interview with a child in Russian military custody.

Maffick Media's Facebook accounts were suspended in 2019 after investigations by CNN and T-online revealed ties to RT and Ruptly. Maffick was defended by RT, which said no official requests to explain the websites were filed with Maffick, and blamed CNN for the controversy. It was also defended by RT Editor-in-Chief Margarita Simonyan and Kremlin spokesman Dmitry Peskov. The pages were restored later that month after they began disclosing their ownership. For example, Soapbox's "About" section now read: "'Soapbox' is a political opinion brand of Maffick, which is owned and operated by Anissa Naouai and Ruptly GmbH, a subsidiary of RT".

The vimeo account for Maffick Video, the account that carried Maffick Media video clips, continues to carry Maffick LLC productions, and as of March 2021, the account continues to refer to itself as "a video startup based in Berlin"

Maffick Media continued to be registered in Germany with Naouai as the head until May 7, 2021, when the company was liquidated.

== State propaganda accusations ==
=== Maffick and Russian state ownership ===
Maffick LLC was incorporated in Summer 2019 by Maffick Media CEO and minority shareholder Anissa Naouai. Naouai founded Maffick LLC in 2019 after moving to Los Angeles and reincorporating its former channels in the new company. The disclosure about Russian state ownership was removed from Maffick's accounts after the new incorporation.

=== State media label and Facebook lawsuit ===
In June 2020, Facebook labeled Maffick LLC's accounts "state-controlled" due to their connections to Maffick Media. The company sued Facebook in the Northern District of California in July 2020 for defamation and monetary damages from lost internet traffic. Maffick's case was dismissed after it was ruled that the company had not proven permanent damage and had largely not disputed Facebook's allegations.

In July 2020, Twitter also began labelling Maffick content as “Russian state-affiliated”. Naouai said she would contest this.

== Reception ==
NBC describes Maffick as platforming

sophisticated English-language video and text content for years that experts say is edited and curated in a way designed to exacerbate American political tensions. A lot of it is aimed at younger viewers and the political left, designed to peel them off from the Democratic party, experts say. Some is tailored to gin up outrage on the right.

Franklin Foer in The Atlantic says that In the Now "build[s] audiences with ephemera (“Man Licks Store Shelves in Online Post”), then hit[s] unsuspecting readers with arguments about Syria and the CIA."
