= Mohammed Junaid Thorne =

Mohammed Junaid Thorne is an Australian Islamic preacher of Aboriginal heritage from Perth, Western Australia. Thorne is noted for his controversial views on Islamic militant groups including Islamic State of Iraq and the Levant. Thorne is a member of the Australian branch of Millatu Ibrahim, a Salafi organisation banned in Germany. In August 2015 Thorne was sentenced to between four and eight months jail for travelling on an aircraft under a false name, and using fake ID to obtain his ticket.

== Personal life ==
Junaid Thorne was born to a Noongar Aboriginal man named Graham Thorne and to a Malaysian Muslim woman. His parents divorced and Junaid's mother remarried a Moroccan Muslim. In 1996, when Junaid was five he was taken to Saudi Arabia to live as his stepfather secured work there. Junaid lived and studied in Saudi Arabia and became transcultured as a Muslim Arab. He stayed in Saudi Arabia until the age of twenty three.

His older brother Shayden was sentenced by Saudi authorities to four and half years on terrorism charges. Junaid was deported from Saudi Arabia to Western Australia in July 2013 after protesting his brother's imprisonment. For his part in the 2016 "Tinnie terror plot", Shayden Thorne was sentenced to three years and ten months jail. Shayden was released in early March 2020, under an interim control order. In November 2014, Junaid Thorne moved from Perth to Sydney.

Thorne is on the Australian Federal Government's terrorism watchlist for his inflammatory social media posts and for lectures indicating support for Islamic State.

On 15 January 2015 Thorne's home in Bass Hill, New South Wales was raided by Australian Federal Police (AFP) officers. He was served with a notice to appear at court in Perth. When traveling between Sydney and Perth, with Omer Issak and Mostafa Shiddiquzzaman, they all used false names. All three pleaded guilty to the charges. Shiddiquzzuman was sentenced to four months in custody, while Issak received a "community-based order" earlier the same year in Perth. On 15 June 2015 Thorne was sentenced to nine months' jail. He was released on bail pending an appeal of his sentence. In August Thorne was sentenced to eight months, with a minimum of four. He is being held in segregation at Goulburn Correctional Centres supermax facility after being classified with the most secure rating, AA.

In 2019 Thorne was charged with drug- and firearm-supply offences.

== Activities ==
Thorne has been an active Islamic preacher in the Muslim community of Australia; he has given a series of lectures at local Islamic centres known for their hardline views of Islam including the iQraa Islamic centre in Brisbane, the (now-closed) Al Risalah Islamic centre in Bankstown, and the (now closed) Al Furqan Islamic centre in Melbourne.

According to Thorne, teenager Numan Haider, who was shot and killed after stabbing two officers from the Joint Counter Terrorism team outside the Endeavour Hills police station in Melbourne, attended a number of his lectures, and he met with the teenager several times. Thorne claimed Haider was "innocent" and had been "murdered in cold blood".

=== Millatu Ibrahim ===
Junaid Thorne has become a member of the Millatu Ibrahim branch in Perth; Millatu Ibrahim has been banned in Germany. According to Thorne, Millatu Ibrahim means "to follow the path of Ibrahim (Abraham)," who is considered a prophet in the Islamic faith. Thorne has claimed that no connection exists between the Australian and German Millatu Ibrahim groups, stating "just because the name is the same... doesn't imply that they're the same or that they know each other."

=== Ruqyah healing ===
Following his move to Sydney in November 2014, Thorne turned toward an Islamic form of spiritual healing known as ruqyah; Thorne, collaborating with a Sydney-based healer, Abu Hamza, began a series of lectures on the subject of spirits in Islam or jinn.

== Views ==
Islamic State of Iraq and the Levant (ISIL)

"If I were to vocalise my complete support to them [Islamic State], I would get in trouble... If I was to say that [I] don't support them at all, that would be untrue... I may support them [on] certain issues, while I disagree with them in other issues."

Democracy and Sharia

"As Muslims, we do reject democracy, we reject other, we look to Sharia, Sharia law, as our main way of governmental system. Not that we are like trying to impose it here or anything. It's just that what we as Muslims want. Me personally, I want, I would love for Sharia law to be implemented here, but it doesn't mean that I'm going to impose it on anyone. But if there was an Islamic state where Sharia law was being implemented I would happily move there. Because as a Muslim, all Muslims, we see that Sharia law is our salvation, or our solution to the problems that we see nowadays."

Charlie Hebdo shooting

Thorne has been critically cited in the media for providing justification for the terrorist attack on the French Charlie Hebdo magazine in Paris, in which 12 people were killed.

== Victim of trolling ==
In 2015, Thorne was the victim of Jewish American online troll, and convicted bomber Joshua Ryne Goldberg, who set up a fake account in the name of the preacher with the intention of smearing Thorne, as well as creating fake jihadist personas that interacted with the fake Thorne account, sending screengrabs of these fabricated interactions to journalists. Not realizing that the "jihadist" accounts were controlled by the same hoaxster that was impersonating Thorne, these faked interactions were published in The West Australian on 18 April 2015, and described as evidence of "the deep hatred many of Thorne's followers harbour towards non-Muslim Australians".

== See also ==
- Islam in Australia
- Islamic organisations in Australia
