= Denis Cuspert =

German rapper and Islamic State member (1975–2018)

Abu Maleeq
- Denis Cuspert in a video produced by IS
- Born: Denis Mamadou Gerhard Cuspert; 18 October 1975; Kreuzberg, West Berlin, West Germany
- Died: 17 January 2018 (aged 42); Gharanij, Deir ez-Zor, Syria
- Cause of death: Airstrike
- Other names: Deso Dogg, Abu Talha al-Almani, Abou Maleeq, Abu Yasir al-Almani
- Occupations: Rapper, IS member
- Spouse: Daniela Greene
- Military career
- Allegiance: Millatu Ibrahim (2012–13) Junud al-Sham (2013) Islamic State (2013–18)
- Service years: 2012–2018
- Conflicts: Egypt: Egyptian Crisis; Libya: Post-civil war violence in Libya; Syria: Syrian civil war; First Battle of Sha'ir; Deir ez-Zor campaign †

Denis Mamadou Gerhard Cuspert (18 October 1975 – 17 January 2018), also known by his stage name Deso Dogg and his nom de guerre Abu Talha al-Almani (Arabic: أبو طلحة الألماني), was a German rapper who became a member of the Islamic State.

Cuspert ended his rap career in 2010, converted to Islam and took on the new Islamic name Abou Maleeq (Arabic: أبو طلحة). He left Germany in 2012 for Egypt and Libya, eventually going to Syria in 2013, where he fought with jihadist anti-government forces in the Syrian Civil War, under the nom de guerre of Abu Talha Al-Almani (meaning Abu Talha the German).

He was wounded during fighting in the northern-Syrian town of Azaz in an air-strike conducted by the Syrian Arab Air Force. In 2014, he gave his oath of allegiance to Islamist-Jihadi group the Islamic State (IS).

The United States Department of State added Cuspert to its list of Specially Designated Global Terrorists on 9 February 2015, and the United Nations Al-Qaida Sanctions Committee designated him on 11 February 2015. In January 2018, the Wafa' Media Foundation announced his death during clashes in the town of Gharanij.

== Early life and education ==
Cuspert was born in Kreuzberg, Berlin on 18 October 1975. His father, Richard Luc-Giffard, was a Ghanaian national who had been deported before Cuspert was born. His mother, Sigrid Cuspert, is German. He was later raised in Charlottenburg, Moabit and Schöneberg. His mother remarried a U.S. Army officer with whom Cuspert had ongoing conflicts. He had a troubled youth and spent some time in a juvenile detention center. In 1995, he began a rapping career with varying success, as he got increasingly involved in street trouble and eventually in crime.

== Musical career ==
In 2002, Cuspert adopted the name Deso Dogg and began recording with the German rapper Charnell, a gangster rapper from Berlin.

After his release from detention, he worked with Montana of Montana Beatz and with the producer Dean Dawson of Streetlife Entertainment. He quit Streetlife label in 2007, reportedly to keep his artistic freedom.

In September 2007, he announced that he was working on a double album titled Alle Augen Auf Mich ("All Eyes on Me"). He also announced that he would quit after this project because he felt disappointed and betrayed by many people in the German rap scene. The release of the album was repeatedly delayed and was ultimately released in November 2009.

In August 2008, he appeared in the television series Der Bluff, acting as a student who becomes a gangsta rapper. In 2010, his song "Willkommen in meiner Welt" (meaning Welcome to my world) was used in the ARD film courage to Zivilcourage (meaning moral courage).

== Islamic militant career ==
=== Radicalisation ===
After his rap career ended and subsequent conversion to Islam in 2010, Cuspert became a member of a radical Islamic group called Die Wahre Religion (meaning The True Religion). He also said he was dropping his earlier name Deso Dogg in favor of the Islamic name Abou Maleeq. He became a vocal "nasheed" singer, singing in German. Controversies ensued as he declared public support for Islamic "Mujahideen" forces in Afghanistan, Iraq, Somalia and Chechnya, describing Berlin as eine weitere Kuffar-Metropole ("yet another kuffar (infidel) metropolis").

Guido Steinberg, an Islamic studies expert at the German Institute for International and Security Affairs think-tank stated that Dogg's music "support[s] a radicalisation process."

The public broadcaster Südwestrundfunk (SWR) said in a report that the "Islamist radical Denis C. (alias "Abu Maleeq") was being investigated for sedition". The popular Report Mainz news magazine on German ARD TV highlighted his videos, including one publicly praising Osama bin Laden in one of his nasheeds. Abou Maleeq announced he was moving from Berlin to Bonn. But his activities came under further scrutiny when Arid Uka, a Kosovo-born ethnic Albanian from Frankfurt am Main, revealed after assassinating two U.S. Airmen and severely wounding two others in an operation in Frankfurt Airport, that he had been greatly influenced in his actions by Abou Maleeq's works and that he was a great fan of the singer.

=== Abu Usama Al-Gharib ===
Denis Cuspert became involved with the Egyptian Austrian-born al-Qaeda affiliate Mohamed Mahmoud (also known as Abu Usama Al-Gharib), who had founded the Global Islamic Media Front (GIMF) as well as the jihadist militant Salafist group Millatu Ibrahim, later banned by the German authorities.

German broadcaster ZDF also received footage, apparently made by Cuspert, in which he threatened to wage Jihad in Germany and warned of attacks. According to German security authorities, Cuspert managed to leave to Egypt, despite heavy observation, to join the remnants of Millatu Ibrahim to try to establish a German Salafist colony that sought to impose Sharia law in Germany.

According to the Al-Qaida Sanctions Committee, while in Egypt Cuspert underwent firearms training in a militant camp, before traveling to Libya for additional training.

=== Syria ===
In August 2013, he appeared in a video fighting alongside the militant group Junud al-Sham against forces loyal to the former Ba'athist regime in Syria led by Bashar Al-Assad in the Syrian civil war. He began using the nom de guerre of Abu Talha al-Almani (Abu Talha the German). In September 2013 Cuspert was reportedly injured in an air strike in Syria. Abu Talha continued to post video footage and messages online in German about his activities, including his advocacy for active participation in jihad and for enactment of Sharia law.

In November 2013, German authorities issued a warning, emanating from its Federal Criminal Police Office (Bundeskriminalamt) and made public through the Foreign Office (Auswärtiges Amt), about a possible attack by Cuspert against German institutions working in Turkey. The warning published by German national daily Die Welt stated that "Cuspert could use an explosive-laden vehicle". In a video posted online, Denis Cuspert denied the allegations, adding that Germany was not his "objective in terms of attacks".

=== Islamic State ===
By late 2013, Cuspert had left Junud al-Sham and joined the Islamic State (IS). He reportedly took part in the First Battle of the Shaer gas field in July 2014 with IS forces against the Syrian Armed Forces.

In the summer of 2014, Daniela Greene, an FBI translator who had been investigating Cuspert, traveled to Syria in order to marry Cuspert. This occurred without knowledge or authorization of her superiors. She returned to the U.S. a few months later, confessed, and cooperated with authorities, in return for a light two-year prison sentence.

"In November 2014, a video was released by the activist group "Deir Ezzore Is Being Slaughtered Silently”, which showed IS members shooting and beheading a number of unarmed men, and Cuspert holding a severed head. The video was believed to be from an August 2014 massacre against prisoners from the Sunni Arab Al-Shaitat tribe who had fought against IS.

== Personal life ==
Cuspert was, at that time, under detention in an open prison system for minor offenders. By mid-2004, he was repeatedly arrested for various new offenses, including violations of the German Opium Act. Consequently, his probation was revoked and Deso Dogg had to serve time in the Tegel Prison. He was in a criminal gang called the "36 Boys", which was based in Kreuzberg, Berlin. The 36 Boys got in violent confrontations with other immigrant street gangs. "I always fought for 36," Cuspert told a reporter of the Exberliner named Robert Rigney. "I bled for 36. I was stabbed for 36."

After a near death experience after a car crash, and affected by Pierre Vogel, a former professional boxer and converted Muslim, he ended his rap career in 2010, declaring his own religious conversion to Islam. He declared his decision to convert in a public video.

Cuspert had allegedly fathered three children with three different women. One of his wives, a German citizen of Tunisian descent named Omaima Abdi who was born in 1984 in Hamburg, went to Syria in 2015 with her three children and first husband Nader Hadra from Frankfurt, who was killed while fighting in Kobane. She later married Cuspert, and lived with him in Raqqa, Syria, then she came back to Germany, where she gave birth to her fourth child. Her phone was recovered by Lebanese journalist Jenan Moussa, which led to an investigation of her relations with IS. In October 2020, she was sentenced to three and a half years in prison, due to her enslavement of a Yazidi girl, violation of the "War Weapons Control Act" by temporarily disposing of a Kalashnikov rifle, and being a member of a terrorist organization abroad.

=== Legal issues ===
In April 2011, the Berlin public prosecutor brought charges of illegal possession of weapons against him after Cuspert appeared as "Abou Maleeq" in a YouTube video brandishing arms. During a house raid, 16 cartridges of 9 mm caliber and .22 were found on the premises. On 18 August 2011, he was found guilty and fined 1800 euros without any jail term being specified. German officials remained vigilant, however, claiming his videos and speeches contained inflammatory rhetoric that promoted violence.

=== Reports of death ===
In April 2014, a number of international media outlets ran erroneous reports based on Islamist online sources that he was killed on 20 April 2014 as a result of infighting amongst the Jihadi groups fighting in Syria, after the rival Al-Nusra Front launched a suicide attack against an IS post. However, German newspaper Die Welt quoted other foreign fighters as denying Cuspert's death and attributing the confusion to the death of another IS member who also used the alias of Abu Talha Al-Almani.

On 16 October 2015, the U.S. Department of Defense informed media outlets that Cuspert had been killed by a U.S. airstrike near Raqqa, Syria.

In August 2016, the Pentagon stated that it had been mistaken: Cuspert had survived the strike near the town of Raqqa.

In January 2018, Wafa' Media Foundation announced his death, accompanying its report with photos of Cuspert's bloodied cadaver. He was reportedly killed in an airstrike during the Deir ez-Zor campaign in the town of Gharanij in the Deir ez-Zor Governorate.

== Reception and legacy ==
In November 2024, American film director Chris Moukarbel released a Paramount+ documentary entitled The Honey Trap: A True Story of Love, Lies and the FBI chronicling the life and career of Cuspert.

== Discography ==
=== Solo ===
- 2006: Murda Cocctail Volume 1 (Mixtape)
- 2006: Schwarzer Engel
- 2008: Geeni’z (with Jasha)
- 2008: Gast ist König
- 2009: Alle Augen auf mich

=== As part of the 030 Gangxta Clicc ===
- 2003: Dreckstape Nr.1
- 2004: Dreckstape Nr.2: Wir übernehmen
- 2004: Dreckstape III
- 2005: Kriminelle Akkusik

=== As a featured artist ===
- 2005: Kaisa – Stacheldrahtmörda (Track: Reisswolf)
- 2006: Fler – Trendsetter (Track: Am Abzug & Intro des Mixtapes 90210)
- 2006: DJ Tomekk – The Nexxt Generation (Track: Liebe, Hass, Schmerz Und Gewalt)
- 2006: Kaisa – Nixx Für Kinda (Track: Untergrund Elite)
- 2006: Dean Dawson – D-Day 06-06-06 (Track: Das Was Wir Tun)
- 2007: B-Lash – 187Beatz Streettape #1 (Tracks: Ein kleines Klatschen reicht und Streetsound)
- 2007: Woroc – Inferno (Track: Gangsta Inferno)
- 2008: Farid Bang – Asphalt Massaka (Track: Mein Block)
- 2008: Nazar – Kinder Des Himmels (Track: 3 Leben 2 Städte)
- 2008: MC Bogy – Atzenkeepers (Track: Betonmacht)
- 2009: Toni der Assi – (Tracks: Gangsterrap und Scheiss Welt)
- 2009: MC Bogy – Bogy & Atzen 2 (Track: Betonmacht) & Der Oldtimer (Track: Oldschooltrip)
- 2011: Said – Said (Tracks: (Dis Is) Mein Leben und Um Den Globus)

=== Other ===
- 2006: Willkommen in meiner Welt (Juice-Exclusive! on Juice-CD #69)
- 2006: Schwarzer Engel (DVD)
- 2007: Afrikana
- 2009: DJ Derezon & Chamillionaire – South Banger 2 (DJ Mix)
- 2010: Bis aufs Blut (Film)
- 2011: Wild Germany (Series, Season 1 Episode 6))
- 2012: Kaisa – Mann Der Stunde (DVD)
- 2012: In the Spot Berlin (DVD)
- 2014: Haya Alal Jihad (made as PR for IS by him)
- 2015: Fisabilillah (made as PR for IS by him)
- 2016: Auf Zum Schlachten! (made as PR for IS by him)

=== Music videos ===
- Willkommen in Berlin City (Charnell, MicWrecka, Deso Dogg, Jasha, Riad & Gin)
- 36/44 (Vero, Deso Dogg & B-Lash feat. SupaFunk)
- Wer hat Angst vorm schwarzen Mann (Directed by: Che Andre Bergendahl)
- Willkommen in meiner Welt (Directed by: Rocco Copecny)
- BBT feat Deso Dogg, Frauenarzt & Sady K – Wir Sind
- Deso Dogg feat. Zaza – Wir bomben eure Szene
- Deso Dogg & Jasha – Das Leben
- Mein Leben
- 2009: MA Vizion feat. Deso Dogg, Gangsta Lu & Paranoya – Wach auf
- 2010: Meine Stadt
- Dogz4life (Halt die Fresse 02 – Nr. 41) (Aggro Berlin)

== See also ==
- Terrorism in Germany
