= MC Bogy =

German rapper

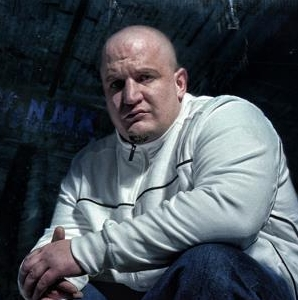
'MC Bogy

MC Bogy (1979 in Berlin), born Moritz Christopher, also known by the pseudonym Der Atzenkeeper, is a German rapper and co-founder of the Berlin street gang Berlin Crime.

== Career ==
Moritz Christopher was born in 1979, the son of a German father and Sudetes-German in Berlin. He was held back in school and sat his school exam as an adult to receive his intermediate school certificate several years later.

In 1998 MC Bogy his first appearance on Bassboxxx tapes in the Berlin underground rap scene. in 2002 he released his first album, with the title "Lyrischer Hooligan." In 2003 he followed this up with the sampler "Bogy und Atzen." In 2004 appeared his first "proper" album, "Der Atzenkeeper."

MC Bogy developed himself with his own motto that he should overcome his difficulties in life through his lyrics and that this practice should serve as a form of self therapy. After the dissolution of Bassboxxx he published his music through his own label "Noch mehr Ketten Entertainment." MC Bogy is often participating in other projects and searching for new young artists.

MC Bogy was also active in the Berlin graffiti scene. Provocative Battle Rap themes, whose goal is to defame others, dominate in his lyrics.

MC Bogy was also in walk-on roll in the music video for Fler's single "Nach eigenen Regeln." In 2006 several collaborative recordings followed, including "Das sind Raphitz" with MOK and "Mein Konto" with Fler. Furthermore, he worked with B-Lash on the Beathoavenz album "Der Neue Standard" as well as made a guest appearance in the album's video trailer.

After a video shoot with Sido (rapper) Bogy was arrested on October 25, 2006, because of armed robbery and awaited trial in the Moabit detention center. Rumors circulated on the Internet that Bogy was arrested for extortion and a breach of Germany's gun laws. On April 3, 2007, at the premier of the video "Faust Hoch" on MTV, the MTV urban moderator confirmed these rumors. MC Bogy explained in an interview with the newspaper Backspin that the legal proceedings for robbery and the violation of the gun law would proceed, but the charge of robbery had been changed to that of making a threat.
