= Jenan Moussa =

Lebanese journalist

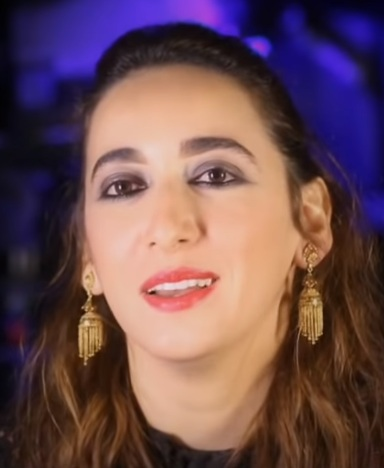
- Jenan Moussa, 19 December 2016
- Born: April 14, 1981 (age 44); Beirut
- Occupations: Reporter and Investigative journalist

Jenan Moussa (Arabic: جنان موسى; born 14 April 1984, Beirut) is an investigative reporter for the Dubai-based Al Aan TV network.

== Early life and education ==
Moussa graduated from the American University of Science and Technology (AUST) in Beirut. She joined Al Aan, taking a position as a desk reporter in their office seven days before the Tunisian revolution. She then deployed as a field reporter, reporting from conflict zones in the Middle East and North Africa.

== Journalism ==
Moussa reported on the system of law and justice established by the 2012–2013 Islamist government in Timbuktu.

In 2018, she interviewed Alexanda Kotey from a prison in Syria. Kotey was a member of the Beatles cell, a group of British Islamic State fighters known for appearing in English-language propaganda and beheading videos.

Moussa tracked down Omaima Abdi, the widow of the German rapper and Islamic State fighter Deso Dogg. She obtained Abdi's cellphone and traced her to Hamburg, Germany. Abdi was detained and prosecuted following Moussa's research. In October 2020, Abdi was sentenced to 3 years and 6 months' imprisonment.

Her reporting about ISIL came again to the news in September 2020, as the Combined Joint Task Force against the Islamic State reported that Moussa investigated the detention of the leader of IS Mohammed Said Abd Al Rahman Al-Mawla in 2008 in Iraq by the United States, and came to the conclusion that he had been betraying members of IS and Al-Qaeda at the time.

In January 2021, Moussa became the host of a new Al Aan prime time talk show, Al Niqaash, that focuses on current events and social issues.

== Awards ==
- In 2008, while still a student at the AUST, she was honored with the Ghassan Tueni Award.
- In 2019, she received the Shifa Gardi International Award.
