= 2011 Frankfurt Airport shooting =

Terrorist attack in Frankfurt, Germany

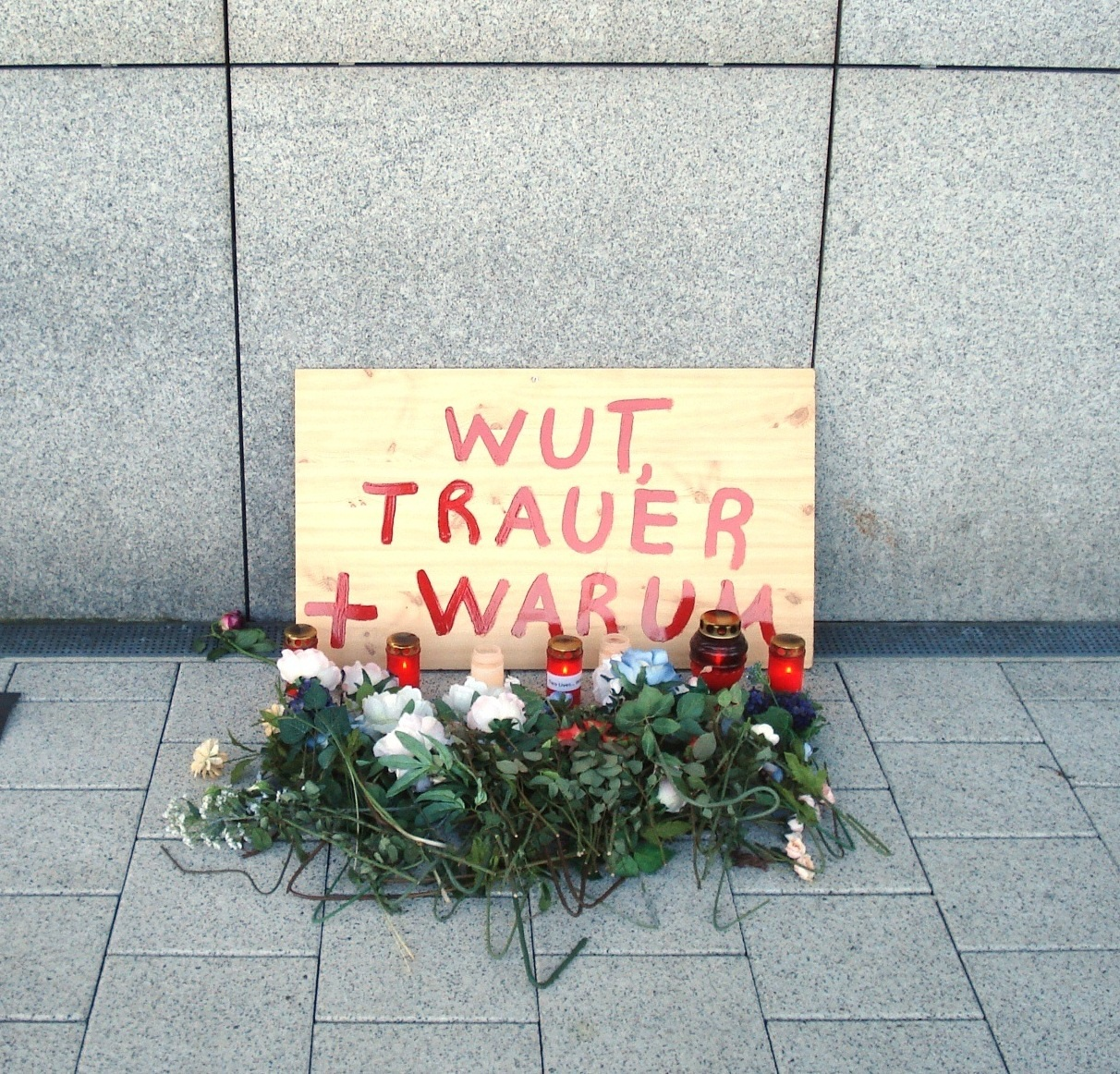
- An improvised memorial to the victims, a few days after the attack: Wut, Trauer + warum? ('Anger, mourning + why?')
- Location: Frankfurt Airport, Frankfurt am Main, Germany
- Date: 2 March 2011 (UTC+01:00)
- Target: United States Air Force
- Attack type: Mass shooting
- Weapon: FN P35 pistol (9 mm)
- Deaths: 2
- Injuries: 2
- Perpetrator: Arid Uka
- Motive: Reaction to United States military violence against Muslims; Islamic extremism

The 2011 Frankfurt Airport shooting occurred on 2 March 2011 at Frankfurt Airport in Germany. The shooter, Arid Uka, was arrested and charged with killing two United States Airmen and seriously wounding two others. He was convicted of murder and attempted murder and sentenced to life in prison on 10 February 2012.

According to the court judge at Oberlandesgericht (Higher Regional Court) Frankfurt, this was the first terrorist attack in Germany in which the perpetrator had an Islamist motive.

== Shooting ==
According to the German investigators, Uka targeted a United States Air Force bus parked outside the terminal building that was supposed to transport 15 U.S. airmen to Ramstein Air Base. He reportedly walked up to a waiting airman, asked him for a cigarette, and wanted to know whether the airmen were bound for Afghanistan. When the airman said yes, according to German prosecutor Rainer Griesbaum, Uka waited for the airman to turn away and then shot him in the back of the head, killing him. Shouting "Allahu Akbar!" the attacker then entered the bus, shooting and killing the driver, fired three shots at two other airmen, wounding them. When he pointed his pistol at the head of Sergeant Trevor Brewer and pulled the trigger, the weapon jammed. Uka fled but was pursued by the civilian airport employee Lamar Joseph Conner and Staff Sergeant Trevor Donald Brewer and shortly afterwards overpowered by two German police officers. He was subsequently arrested.

The two victims killed in the shooting were Senior Airman Nicholas Alden, 25, of South Carolina and Airman First Class Zachary Cuddeback, 21, of Virginia. Staff Sgt. Kristoffer Schneider was shot in the right temple and lost his sight in one eye. The right side of his face had to be rebuilt with titanium, and he suffers head pain and seizures. Part of his skull also had to be removed after an infection. Schneider was medically retired in 2012. Edgar Veguilla was hit in the jaw and arm and suffered nerve damage.

Conner and Brewer later received the Order of Merit of the Federal Republic of Germany in a ceremony on 16 January 2012. Federal Interior Minister Hans-Peter Friedrich presented the decoration, citing their "exemplary courage and action which helped the Federal Police arrest the suspect".

== Perpetrator ==
Arid Uka, the 21-year-old perpetrator, was a Kosovo-born ethnic Albanian Muslim who had lived in Germany since he was one year old; his family having lived in there for four decades. His grandfather was a Kosovo Albanian imam, while his parents and two brothers led secular lives. He had been working at the airport post office. He had not shown any jihadist inclinations before the attacks, but radicalized rapidly beginning in late summer 2010.

In the months before the attack, he underwent a late-adolescent crisis. Uka left school before his university-entrance diploma, but did not tell his family. Instead, he told them that he had finished the diploma successfully. His family members, former friends, and one of his employers described him as introverted, polite, and not aggressive. Months before the shooting, Uka broke ties to all his friends and retreated. During this time, he was extensively surfing the web visiting websites with Salafi jihadist content. He started wearing typically Islamic clothing and began to study Arabic.

Uka decided to join the fighting in Iraq or Afghanistan but failed to do so since he failed to establish the right contacts. Through the internet, Uka established contact with Sheikh Abdellatif, a Moroccan preacher and jihadism supporter affiliated with the Da'wa group, who preached in two mosques in Frankfurt. The Salafi mosque of these two is considered as a meeting-point for radical Islamists. Several well-known Islamists have been seen there. An early example of Salafist lone wolf terrorism in Europe, Uka's sole contacts with extremists was online, he never had direct personal contact and was never involved in physical network.

According to German authorities, Uka confessed to the killings when interrogated after the shooting. Uka's lawyer said that the motivation for the shooting was a video on YouTube, which showed U.S. soldiers raping Iraqi Muslim women. Uka was convinced that the video was genuine, but it was in fact a clip taken from Redacted, an American film based on the Mahmudiyah massacre. On the internet, Uka posted on several Islamist forums, later claiming that through the content and the discussions in these forums, he came to believe that his fellow Muslims were in global war with the United States. Uka was also influenced by jihadist nasheeds, including a nasheed made by Abou Maleeq, who would later join the Islamic State.

=== Trial and sentence ===
During Uka's trial, his defence lawyer described him as a non-typical violent criminal who is neither religiously motivated nor an Islamist terrorist, while the Attorney General of Germany named Uka as a single perpetrator, which was applied for a sentence of life imprisonment plus a finding of "exceptional gravity of guilt".

On 10 February 2012, the Hessian State Superior Court (Oberlandesgericht Frankfurt am Main) sentenced Uka to life imprisonment for two counts of murder and three counts of attempted murder with the determination of an "exceptional gravity of guilt", which means that he will not be eligible for parole after having served fifteen years. Because he was sentenced to more than three years imprisonment, he will be deported to Kosovo after having served his sentence as he does not hold German citizenship.

== See also ==
- List of Islamist terrorist attacks
