= Millatu Ibrahim =

Millatu Ibrahim (Arabic: مِلَّةُ إِبْرَاهِيْمَ, romanized: Millatu ʾIbrāhīm) is an Islamist organization outlawed in Germany. The group's leader is Mohamed Mahmoud (also known as Abu Usama Al-Gharib) who emigrated to Egypt in April, 2012.

Senior members include former rapper Deso Dogg, Fadi Mohammad El Kurdi (also known as Abu Mohammad Al Almani) and Michael Nowak (also known as Abu Dawud Al Almani). The group has sided with jihadists in the Syrian civil war.

== Founding ==
Millatu Ibrahim was founded in the fall of 2011, in a "backyard mosque" in Solingen; the group has around 50 members.

== Banning in Germany ==
On May 29, 2012, Germany's Interior Minister declared a ban on the Millatu Ibrahim organization "because of efforts against the constitutional order" and cited incidents where the group turned to violence. The group has called for further violence.

== Australian branch ==
A branch of the Millatu Ibrahim organization has been established in Australia, Islamic preacher Mohammed Junaid Thorne is a notable member; but when questioned by the media, Thorne stated that the two groups share the same name but are not otherwise connected.
