= Ruptly =

Russian state-backed video news agency

- Formation: 4 April 2013; 13 years ago
- Headquarters: Lennéstraße 1 Berlin, Germany
- Official language: English; Russian; Spanish; Arabic
- Owner: RT
- Website: ruptly.tv

Ruptly GmbH is a Russian state-owned video news agency specializing in video-on-demand, based in Berlin, Germany. It is a subsidiary of the Russian state-controlled television network RT. Ruptly owns the media channel Redfish and is the major shareholder of the digital content company Maffick. Its chief executive is Dinara Toktosunova. Upon Russia's invasion of Ukraine, the company faced a staff exodus. In January 2023, Toktosunova was sanctioned by Ukraine.

== History ==
Ruptly joined the German Commercial Register as a Berlin-based GmbH in July 2012, before officially launching operations on 4 April 2013. It is a subsidiary of the Russian state-controlled TV network RT, and operates as a German commercial entity. ANO TV Novosti, an organization that is primarily funded by a Russian government grant, oversees the broadcasts of RT.

In February 2021, it signed a deal with Chinese state-owned CCTV+ to open up access to China news coverage. In May 2021, it won a Shorty Award for Best Live Event Coverage, for its footage from the impact and aftermath of the 2020 Beirut port blast.

Ruptly employees, including multiple staff members in senior positions, resigned in response to the Russian invasion of Ukraine, after the Russian government restricted news outlets from describing the military offensive as an invasion.

== Notable videos ==
In October 2017, a Ruptly-produced viral video about an American restaurant creating a special burger to celebrate Vladimir Putin's birthday turned out to be fabricated. Ruptly removed the video from its YouTube channel and stated that its employees and not the restaurant were involved in the creation of the video, "which, unfortunately, compromised the reliability of the video. We are grateful to our audience for drawing attention to the discrepancy in our story".

On 27 November 2018, Polygraph.info alleged that Ruptly published a misleadingly edited video of an altercation between Ukrainian and Russian ships during the Kerch Strait incident in which a Ukrainian tugboat was rammed by a Russian Coast Guard vessel. Polygraph later updated the story to advise that Ruptly had contacted it to say Ruptly "acquired and published without editing" a short version of the ramming video which it had received on 25 November 2018 and that it published the full version, "as soon as" it was able to obtain it. Polygraph confirmed that Ruptly did publish the full version of the video on 26 November but that the full version was published by other Russian media on 25 November. In its update, Polygraph stated that it had "no means to independently confirm that Ruptly.tv did not edit the first, shorter version, of the video".

In April 2019, Ruptly provided exclusive video coverage of Julian Assange being forcibly removed from the Embassy of Ecuador, London. Ruptly obtained the footage by videoing the embassy using a crew of five working in shifts 24 hours per day for the week leading up to Assange's arrest. Ruptly's twitter video of the arrest achieved 1.7 million views within a day.

During 2018 and 2019, Ruptly provided live coverage from France of the yellow vest protests.

In August 2020, The New York Times reported that a Ruptly video of Black Lives Matter protesters apparently burning a bible in Portland, Oregon, edited in a misleading way, "went viral" after it being shared with an inaccurate caption on social media by far-right personality Ian Miles Cheong and then conservative politicians. The Times said the clip "appear[ed] to be one of the first viral Russian disinformation hits of the 2020 presidential campaign”. An NBC report in the wake of this incident found that Ruptly edited user-generated protest videos to highlight violence over peaceful protest.

Ruptly's most popular video on social media in 2020 was exclusive footage of the 2020 Beirut explosion. The video, which was taken during a wedding, had 4.9 million viewers on YouTube.

== Organization ==
Ruptly has a team of 80 journalists from 42 countries at its Berlin newsroom, and has offices in Moscow and Beijing. Along with its full time video journalists, it employs freelance video journalists, or stringers, to capture on-demand content at the scene of events. Ruptly takes user-generated content (UGC) via social media and its Ruptly Stringer app.

During the 2008 financial crisis, the Russian government included ANO TV-Novosti on its list of core organizations of strategic importance of Russia. Ruptly has stated it was founded by ANO TV-Novosti "to act as an independent, commercially-funded organisation under German law", that its editorial and operational decisions are "completely independent" and the claim it is run by the Russian government is "factually false".

Ruptly's organization also includes the Berlin-based subsidiary Redfish. According to the Alliance For Securing Democracy and UK journalist Paul Mason, Redfish is aimed at the political left and African Americans.

Until it closed in 2021, Maffick GmbH was also based in Berlin and registered to the same address as Ruptly, according to the Alliance for Securing Democracy, with the same address shared by Redfish.

Maffick had been founded by ex-RT journalist Anissa Naouai. In February 2019, Maffick's Facebook page began to mention its connection to RT and Ruptly. Maffick denied any connection to Ruptly and in July 2020 filed a lawsuit against Facebook after the website labelled its pages as "Russia state-controlled media", which Maffick claim is a "false notice".

== Assessment ==
Ruptly is one of several Russian media organizations that has been accused by the US government and others of attempting to influence elections through social media. These sources say that Ruptly targets a younger left-leaning demographic through its video promotion on social media. NBC has reported that Ruptly is a platform for sophisticated English-language video and text content that experts say is edited and curated to exacerbate American political tensions, with a particular focus being younger viewers and the political left.

Other sources, such as The New York Times and Paul Mason, have accused Ruptly of pandering to far-right extremists.

According to a 2014 opinion article by four staff editors for the German news publication Spiegel Online, "With the help of news services like RT and Ruptly, the Kremlin is seeking to reshape the way the world thinks about Russia. And it has been highly successful: Vladimir Putin has won the propaganda war over Ukraine and the West is divided." The writers stated that only the BBC had more clips viewed on YouTube.

In 2014, British vlogger Graham Phillips was banned from Ukraine. In 2015, StopFake published an article in which it said Phillips had worked for Ruptly among other Russian state platforms to produce Pro-Kremlin propaganda and had links to the Russian FSB intelligence agency.

In 2019, Ruptly was criticised by browser extension NewsGuard:

Although Ruptly has published straightforward content from around the world, its videos and headlines of topics of interest to the Kremlin have repeatedly featured false or misleading statements from Russian government officials, including denials that Syria was behind chemical weapons attacks of its own citizens. Although the footage accurately quotes Russian authorities, NewsGuard has determined that Ruptly, as a government run outlet publishing the government’s false claims, has repeatedly published false content and does not gather and present information responsibly.

Ruptly responded that "As a video news agency providing content to journalists, our role is to present raw footage that our clients ensure their journalists edit and use responsibly." Ruptly said the claim it was run by the Russian government was "factually false": "Ruptly was founded by ANO TV Novosti to act as an independent, commercially-funded organisation under German law, and sister agency to RT. It has commercial relations with all its clients including RT." It noted that videos on its platform contain criticism of the Kremlin, including anti-Putin demonstrations in Russia and around the world, protests outside the Russian embassy in Berlin and global demonstrations in support of opposition activist leader Alexei Navalny.

Statistics from Tubular Labs show Ruptly was the most-watched news agency on YouTube in 2020, topping Yonhap, Associated Press, Reuters, Xinhua and AFP. Multiple investigations have identified personnel and organizational links between Ruptly and Abu Dhabi-registered video news agency Viory.

== Awards and nominations ==
Organization	Year	Category/award	Project/service	Result	Ref.
Webby Awards	2020	Best Data Visualisation	Dyatlov Group's Journal	Honoree	
AIB Awards	2020	News Agency of the Year		Shortlisted	
White Square Awards	2020	Interactive Brand Content	Dyatlov Group's Journal	Gold	
Shorty Awards	2020	Best Multiplatform Campaign	Dyatlov Group's Journal	Won	
Shorty Awards	2020	Best Use of Storytelling	Dyatlov Group's Journal	Won	
Shorty Awards	2019	Best Live News Coverage	Yellow Vests live streams	Won	
Digiday Awards Europe	2019	Best Use of Live	Ruptly Live	Won	
Digiday Awards Europe	2019	Video Team of the Year		Finalist	

== See also ==
- CCTV+
- List of news agencies
