= Mass media in the United Arab Emirates =

Mass media in the United Arab Emirates (UAE) is subject to government control and censorship. Media freedom is severely curtailed in the UAE. Most UAE media is owned by the government or by groups that have ties to the government. UAE law permits the government to censor content critical of the government. Journalists and writers who criticize the government are subject to repression.

== Newspapers and magazines ==
The first newspaper to appear in the United Arab Emirates was Al-Ittihad, considered the first proper Arabic-language newspaper in 1969, followed by Al Khaleej, the first Arabic daily, in 1970. Other papers had been printed and circulated before that time, but because of print and publication issues, Al-Ittihad is still considered the first actual one. The first English daily, Khaleej Times, was launched in 1978.

Al-Ittihad is still government-owned today. The country's largest English- and Arabic language newspapers, Al Khaleej and Gulf News, are privately owned. Media activity is governed by Federal Decree-Law No. 55 of 2023 on Media Regulation, under which a licence from the competent authority is required to practise any media activity or to issue publications. In 2025, Federal Decree-Law No. 11 of 2025 established the National Media Authority as the federal media regulator, superseding the former National Media Council. Laws also govern press content and proscribed subjects. The National Media Council censors review all imported media for content. Indeed, media in the United Arab Emirates are subject to national standards. Any offense is prohibited by the government, especially disrespect to the regime of the United Arab Emirates, its symbols and the political system, the divine and Islamic beliefs and other religions, and the culture and heritage of the U.A.E.

In the United Arab Emirates, the right to grant publishing licenses to allow private ownership of newspaper is granted by a decree from the Ministers Council.

Nowadays, the United Arab Emirates, mostly Dubai and Abu Dhabi, publish and produce many newspapers of international languages. The most prominent remains Arabic and English language newspapers.

There are seven Arabic newspapers:

- Al Khaleej (Sharjah)
- Akhbar Al Arab (Abu Dhabi)
- Al Bayan (Dubai)
- Al Fraj (Abu Dhabi)
- Al-Ittihad (Al Waseet) (Abu Dhabi)
- Awraq
- Emarat Al Youm (Dubai)

English language media:

- The Arabian Post
- Dubai Standard
- Emirates Business 24/7
- Emirates Today (defunct)
- Expat Media (with print publication)
- Gulf News (with print publications)
- The Gulf Time
- The Gulf Today (with print publication)
- Khaleej Times (with print publications)
- The Filipino Times
- The National (with print publication)
- Sport360 (defunct)
- XPRESS (defunct)
- 7Days (defunct)
- The Brew News

With the advent of online media, most of the traditional print newspapers have been severely affected. Revenues of the large groups like Gulf News and Khaleej Times have been dropping every year. Professionals like Ravi Raman, who joined Khaleej Times in 2017, strongly worked on reinventing the revenue model by making newspapers a 360 solution providers. Though a lot of success was achieved in launching an events and conferences division, the group was slow to react to the changing market dynamics.

Dubai also publishes many foreign languages, as its population is cosmopolitan, like the Malayalam-language Gulf Madhyamam Daily and Manorama Daily, Tamil-language DAILYTHANTHI Daily, Chinese-language Nihao Newspaper, Russian-language Komsomolskaya Pravda and Spanish-language El Correo del Golfo. Today the Arab press in the Gulf is among the most advanced of its Arab counterparts. However, press freedom continues to suffer, as it is often freely acknowledged by Gulf leaders. The Information Minister of UAE, Shaikh Abdallah Bin Zayed Al Nahyan, once proclaimed: "It is difficult to speak about local press freedom while the media machine is not run by local journalists".

The United Arab Emirates also publishes local and regional magazines. The first and main publishing company ever created in the United Arab Emirates was Motivate Publishing in 1979 by Ian Fairservice. It is based in Dubai Media City and Abu Dhabi. Motivate is known for its wide range of magazines and books on topics related to the heritage of the region. It launched What's On in 1979, the first magazine in the Gulf and still the biggest-selling in the region. Most of them are English language entertainment magazines such as Friday Magazine, Expat Media Special Edition, Emirates Women, Time Out, as well as foreign language magazines. It follows the same principles as UAE's newspapers.

== Radio ==
Radio in the UAE is omnipresent as it is considered essential to surviving long-distance roads and traffic with most stations placing importance on frequent traffic updates during the day, mostly from listeners, especially in Emirates like Dubai, where roads are always crowded and traffic is usual.

This popular medium appeared in the UAE 60 years ago. Before having their own radio stations, UAE was under British occupation. Therefore, the British Forces Broadcasting Services (BFBC) had a local FM radio studio in the UAE. The first broadcast radio station of the UAE, Abu Dhabi Radio, only appeared in 1966. The UAE is well served by terrestrial radio with a variety of stations broadcasting in the languages commonly spoken in the country. The UAE has one of the highest number of local government-owned FM radio stations in the Arab world.

However, in the late 1970s, UAE Radio started independent services. Launched in June 1997, 104.8 FM Channel 4 was the first commercial radio station of the UAE (under Channel 4 Radio Network), followed by Emirates Media Radio and the Arab Media Group. Today, independent radio stations in the UAE include Arabic, English, Hindi, Malayalam, Russian, Tagalog and many other languages.

The need to broadcast in multiple languages to cater to expatriates enhances the number of FM radio stations.

UAE Radio stations include the likes of Al Rabia (number 1 Arabic language radio station), Quran Kareem FM, Emarat FM, Gold FM, Abu Dhabi FM, Abu Dhabi Classic FM, 89.1 Radio 4 (number 1 Hindi radio station).

Although independent radio stations are now implemented, the media in the UAE is still heavily government regulated. Most stations, even those privately owned, are often still government controlled. For example, all radio stations must cease normal broadcasting in the event of the death of a Sheikh or close relative of a Sheikh for a period of 3 days to a week, or more, depending on who is the deceased.

== Television ==
In 1969, the United Arab Emirates’ first television channel, Abu Dhabi Television, was launched. In the years that followed, many more stations and channels commenced operations notably Channel 33, which launched in 1997 and targeted expatriates. Throughout the 1970s and 1980s, the Ministry of Culture established a transmission network for radio and television, building a foundation for future broadcasters.

In 2013, TV View aggregator released figures showing that seven out of the top ten most-watched channels in the UAE were from MBC networks. In 2014, TNS Global, a market research company, carried out a survey of Emirati viewership, finding that the UAE has one of the highest in the world with 86% of subjects responding that they watched television daily to varying degrees.

Some of the major umbrella media groups in the UAE include Dubai Media Incorporated, Sharjah Media Corporation and Abu Dhabi Media Incorporated. Dubai Media Incorporated is a government group founded in 2003. It mainly airs entertainment content but also often broadcasts religious programming. It created Dubai One, a popular channel and the 2004 rebranding of Channel 33. Abu Dhabi Media Incorporated, also known as Emirates Media Incorporated, is a governmental body responsible for the establishment of the first UAE television station in 1969 and the first channel, Abu Dhabi TV. It is also the home of Al-Emarat Channel, the official television channel of the UAE under the slogan "Al Bayt Mitawahid’ or "The House is United".

As the current media groups in charge of television operations are governmental bodies, the relative regulations are a fundamental part of operations rather than exterior enforcements as seen across the UAE's media landscape.

== Internet and social media ==
The internet was made available to the general public of the UAE in 1995. The National Telecommunications Carrier Etisalat, a governmental company, began to operate at this time. Etisalat law or the first law of 1991 states that "the company enjoys continuous monopoly, no other entity may construct". The government holds ownership and the majority share, 60% of Etisalat.

In 2003, the Telecommunications Regulatory Authority (TRA) was established to filter internet content on the basis of Emirati cultural or religious values. However, there have been some cases surrounding censorship of content being deemed unjust by the public. In 2009, the internet forum UAE Hewar was launched and started gaining popularity quickly however the government blocked then closed it down in 2010. In 2012, a request was made to unblock the website but this was rejected by the Federal Supreme Court.

According to the World Economic Forum, the UAE is ranked as the 26th most networked country globally and as the highest in the Arab world. In 2016, a survey by Northwestern University in Qatar found that, at an approximate of 80.6%, the United Arab Emirates has the highest mobile phone penetration in the Arab region. This directly increases access to social media.

According to Global Statistics, in February 2018, Facebook, YouTube and Twitter were ranked as the third most popular social media outlets in the UAE, holding 74%, 9% and 7% of social media usage respectively.

His Highness Sheikh Mohammed bin Rashid Al Maktoum is a great proponent of social media, frequently using different popular outlets to communicate with the public. In 2014, he created the "Arab Social Media Award" to recognize and reward the positive impact of social media on the UAE.

In 2015, Google stated that a request was made by the TRA to pull down a YouTube video "depicting an Emirati royal family torturing Sudanese workers". Google denied the request but/and the TRA went on to filter search results.

On March 6 of 2018, the National Media Council, the UAE's main regulatory body regarding all media content and operations, announced new guidelines for UAE social media influencers. These guidelines state that a situation wherein a creator blogs or only discusses personal experiences is exempt from regulation, but that any type of promotion or advertising requires a license of approval from the NMC. Director General of the NMC, Mansour Al-Mansouri states that "[these] new regulations are part of the council’s plan to promote and develop an advanced legislative and regulatory environment for the UAE media sector".

In November 2019, the UAE announced 49 artists, seven from each emirate, will help create the country's national logo, as part of its national branding.

In March 2020 following the COVID-19 outbreak, social networking channels and video streaming services, achieved a double-digit growth in the number of users, according to the UAE's telecoms regulator. YouTube saw a 16 per cent month-on-month increase in users during March, whereas Facebook and Twitter experienced 17 per cent and 22 per cent monthly increases. Other social media platforms to see a surge were Instagram, which saw a 12 per cent jump, while Snapchat recorded a 9 per cent rise in monthly users. Among OTT platforms, Amazon Prime subscribers increased 44 per cent last month, whereas its rival Netflix registered a 26 per cent jump in user numbers. Research by Dubai-headquartered research and digital agency Global Media Insight revealed that Google-owned YouTube had 8.65 million users in February. It was followed by Facebook and Instagram with 7.88 million and 6.68 million users. The nationwide lockdown contributed to the increasing social media usage, video conferencing and networking according to Francis Kalarickal, director of Global Media Insight.

== See also ==
- Telecommunications in the United Arab Emirates
- Television in the United Arab Emirates
