= 2007 Temple of Awwam bombing =

Suicide car bombing in Yemen

- Part of the al-Qaeda insurgency in Yemen
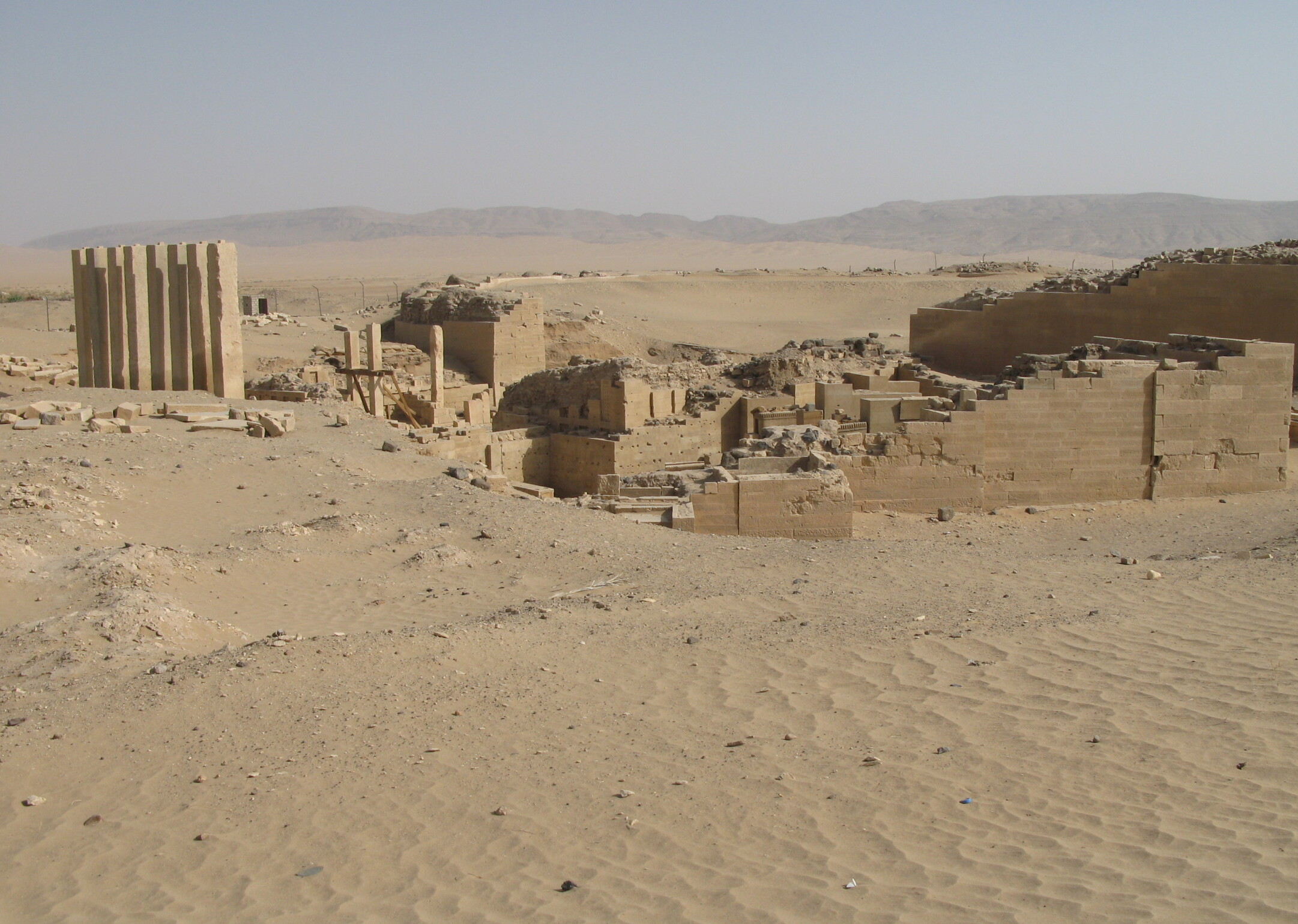
- The Temple of Awwam in 2008
- Location: 15°24′21″N 45°21′17″E; Temple of Awwam, Marib Governorate, Yemen
- Date: 2 July 2007 c.14:30 (GMT)
- Target: Spanish tourist convoy
- Attack type: Suicide car bombing
- Deaths: 11 (including the perpetrator)
- Injuries: 11
- Perpetrator: Al-Qaeda in Yemen
- Assailant: Abdu Muhammad Sa'ad Ahmed Ruhayqah †
- Accused: 11

On 2 July 2007, a suicide attack involving a car bomb took place at the Temple of Awwam, a popular tourist attraction in Marib Governorate, Yemen. The attack was perpetrated by al-Qaeda in Yemen, partly as a means to demonstrate its resurgence since the previous year. A cell of militants recruited and trained 21-year-old Abdu Muhammad Sa'ad Ahmed Ruhayqah to drive a explosive-laden car into a convoy of tourists from Spain who were set to visit the temple. On the day of the bombing, Ruhayqah parked his car by the road leading to the temple and then rammed it into the four-vehicle tourist convoy as it was exiting the site. Eight tourists and two Yemeni drivers were killed, while an additional five tourists, two drivers and four security personnel were left injured.

A joint investigation into the bombing was initiated by the Audiencia Nacional in Spain with participation from Yemeni investigators. An 11-man al-Qaeda cell was publicly identified in August by Yemeni authorities as the perpetrators of the attack, none of whom were in custody by that point. As time went on, cooperation between Spanish and Yemeni authorities had waned, leading to the Audiencia Nacional closing their case in 2011. Raids undertaken by Yemeni security forces had killed several suspects connected in the bombing, including Egyptian militant Ahmed Bassiouni Dewidar as well as Ali bin Ali Douha, head of the cell in Marib responsible for it. In 2015, an alleged former al-Qaeda informant claimed he had warned the Yemeni government of the attack multiple times prior to its occurrence but was ignored.

The attack was met with condemnation from Yemeni and Spanish officials and demonstrations against it from people in both countries. It had a notable negative impact on tourism in Yemen, and was indicative of the renewed threat posed by al-Qaeda.

== Background ==
=== Al-Qaeda resurgence ===
After years of relative dormancy, al-Qaeda in Yemen experienced a resurgence through a prison escape in February 2006 which freed several militants. The jihadists soon began organizing attacks in the country, leading to a failed pair of suicide attacks against two oil facilities in September of that year, one of them in Marib Governorate. The killing of Fawaz al-Rabiee the next month by security forces led to Nasir al-Wuhayshi becoming the primary leader of the group through a phase of reorganization. Wuhayshi appointed emirs from prominent tribes to lead the planning of attacks at the local level. For Marib, he selected Ali bin Ali Douha, a former prisoner and member of the influential Abidah tribe, as their local emir.

A three-man cell in Marib led by Douha assassinated chief criminal investigator Ali Mahmud Qasaylah on 29 March 2007, the Yemeni government paying little attention. In late June, the group issued several statements in the first public announcement of its revival. One of those statements, published through opposition news website al-shoura.net and attributed to Wuhayshi, swore vengeance against the government and listed four demands for it: the release of imprisoned militants, authorization to travel to Iraq, the end of cooperation with anti-Islamic countries, and the administration of Sharia, and threatened to take action if they were not completed.

=== Tourism in Yemen ===
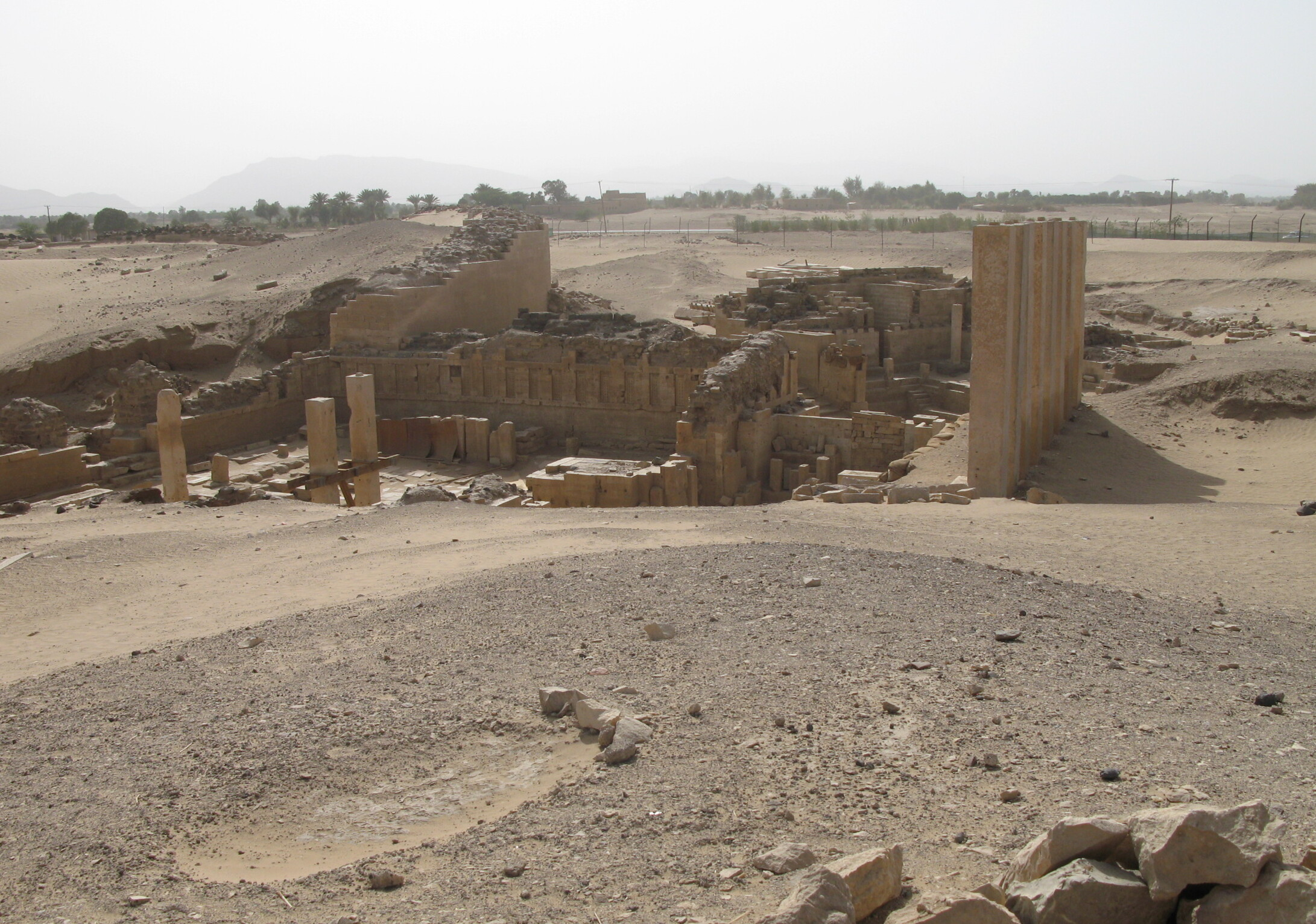
The Temple of Awwam in 2012

At the time of the attack, tourism was a relatively unpopular industry in Yemen. Marib attracted a particularly negative reputation due to numerous tourist kidnapping incidents in the 1990s, although most of them did not involve violence. The Spanish foreign ministry included Marib in a travel advisory for several areas in Yemen, warning its citizens of travelling unless accompanied by a local guide and military escort. Despite this, Marib began to see a small increase in tourism as security incidents became rarer.

One of the most popular tourist attractions in Marib and in Yemen at large was the Temple of Awwam, a nearly 3,000 year old archaeological structure built during the ancient kingdom of Sheba and associated with the Queen of Sheba. The Yemeni government had been attempting to further promote the site since it had been renovated years prior.

== Bombing ==
=== Planning ===
The Douha cell began lobbying for another operation shortly after the assassination of Qasaylah in March. Wuhayshi and Qasim al-Raymi decided to target foreign tourists, rationalised through a supposed edict from the Islamic prophet Muhammad to "expel the infidels from the Arabian peninsula", just as it was used by Osama bin Laden. The Temple of Awwam was selected as the site for the attack due to their being a single exit on the road to the area, leaving any tourist convoy close together and highly vulnerable. According to a former informant, the bombing was meant to be a demonstration that the al-Qaeda was still operational in Yemen and was capable of attacking targets associated with the United States and other nations supporting the war on terror. He also claimed that Raymi knew the exact movements of the tourists who were targeted.

A government investigation determined that an 11-man cell (including the suicide bomber) was responsible for facilitating the attack. The bomber was identified as Abdu Muhammad Sa'ad Ahmed Ruhayqah, a 21-year-old Yemeni man born in Mazhar district, Raymah Governorate. Ruhayqah had been living in the Musayk neighbourhood of Sanaa, an area noted for being concentrated with Islamists, when he was recruited to conduct the bombing by Hamza Ali Saleh al-Dhayani. Authorities later claimed that Ammar al-Wa'eli was also involved recruiting in recruiting Ruhayqah, both of the men acting on the orders of Hamza al-Quaiti.

Dhayani transported Ruhayqah to Wadi Abidah in Marib, where the militants responsible for planning and executing the attack resided. These individuals were identified as Wuhayshi, Raymi, Quaiti, Douha, Wa'eli, and Mohammed Saleh al-Kazemi. Douha and Naji Ali Saleh Jaradan, both members of the al-Hutayk subtribe of Abidah, provided refuge for Ruhayqah near Marib city as they planned the attack, most likely in the villages of al-Rashid Manif in Abidah tribal territory.Saudi national Nayif Mohammed al-Qahtani was also reportedly involved in sheltering Ruhayqah, while the Egyptian Ahmed Bassiouni Dewidar provided the cell with logistical support.

Ruhayqah did not know how to drive when he was recruited. He received lessons from the militants for weeks in numerous wadis of Marib until he was adequately prepared. Dhayani, who was a taxi driver, reportedly allowed Ruhayqah to use his own car to do so. Al-Qaeda filmed several propaganda recordings of Ruhayqah in the lead-up to the bombing, including his last will and testament.

=== Attack ===
At around mid-morning on 2 July, a group of Spanish tourists embarked from Sanaa to Marib Governorate, where they toured Marib city and the Marib Dam before heading to the Temple of Awwam. The 13 tourists had arrived in Yemen on 30 June in a tour package organised by Basque travel agency Banao. They were travelling a convoy of four vehicles, the middle two occupied by them with Yemeni security vehicles at the front and end. A military patrol had stopped the group as they were travelling to the temple and accompanied them thereon.

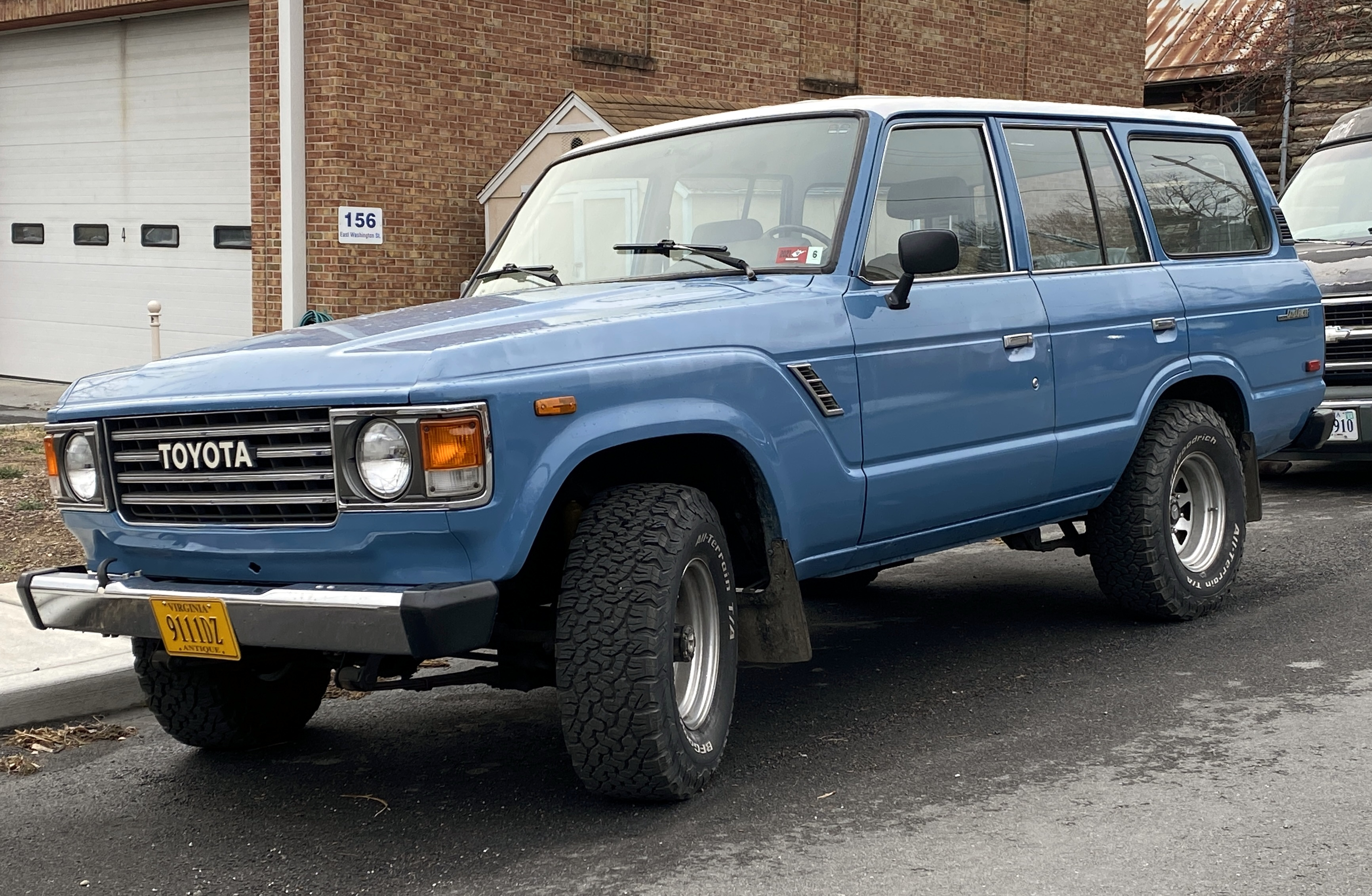
A 1982 Toyota Land Cruiser, similar to the one used in the attack.

After the tourists had arrived at the Temple of Awwam, Ruhayqah parked a 1982 Toyota Land Cruiser by the Marib–Safer road adjacent to the temple from which the convoy entered. Investigators found that the car used in the bombing had been filled with medical oxygen tanks, which were the primary contributor to the blast after the initial detonation by TNT packets. Also stored in the vehicle were multiple 132mm shells to cause further damage.

Ruhayqah prepared to start his car as he saw most of the tourists boarding their vehicles and taking their last photographs. At around 14:30 GMT, just as the final tourist had boarded the convoy and the first car had turned onto the road, Ruhayqah rammed the car bomb into the two middle vehicles used by the tourists. The blast, about 50 metres away from the temple itself, scattered vehicle components and body parts around the road.

Describing the scene from the third vehicle, one wounded survivor said "I saw that the first car was burning, in the second one the people looked pretty bad, and in mine everyone was shouting... I couldn't see what was happening in the fourth as I ducked because they were shooting."

=== Casualties ===
Excluding the suicide bomber, 10 people were killed in the attack: eight Spanish tourists and two Yemeni drivers. Of the Spaniards killed, two were from Zarautz in Gipuzkoa province: 54-year-old Mikel Essery, a prolific traveller who led the expedition, and 24-year-old Magie Álvarez Calleja, who accompanied Arruti to receive experience in leading travel groups. Two married couples were killed: Gabriel Tortosa Ortega, an engineer from Badalona, Barcelona, and María Isabel Arranz Bocos, a teacher from Burgos, along with Antonio Pomés Tallo, a retired banker from Nou Barris, Barcelona, and María Teresa Pérez Ubago, a teacher from Burgos. The two others killed were 54-year-old Marta Borrell Puig, a teacher from Girona, and Amurrio, Álava, native María Asunción Vitorica.

Five other tourists, two drivers and four security personnel were reported as being wounded. The former consisted of Julia Vilaró, a family doctor from Barcelona, María Estíbaliz of Biscay, María Begoña Larrabeiti, Eva María de Mena, and Esteve Masó, husband of Marta Borrell. Masó managed to avoid much of the blast as he was bending downwards in his seat while placing a camera in his bag. The only injured tourist who was not immediately repatriated was Vitorica, who was in a critical condition due to suffering severe head injuries from the bombing. Vitorica underwent surgery twice within 24 hours of the bombing at the al-Thawra hospital in Sanaa. A Spanish aircraft carrying two of her sisters and a neurosurgeon to assist in her treatment arrived in Yemen on 4 July. She died on 14 July after suffering brain death two days prior.

== Investigation ==
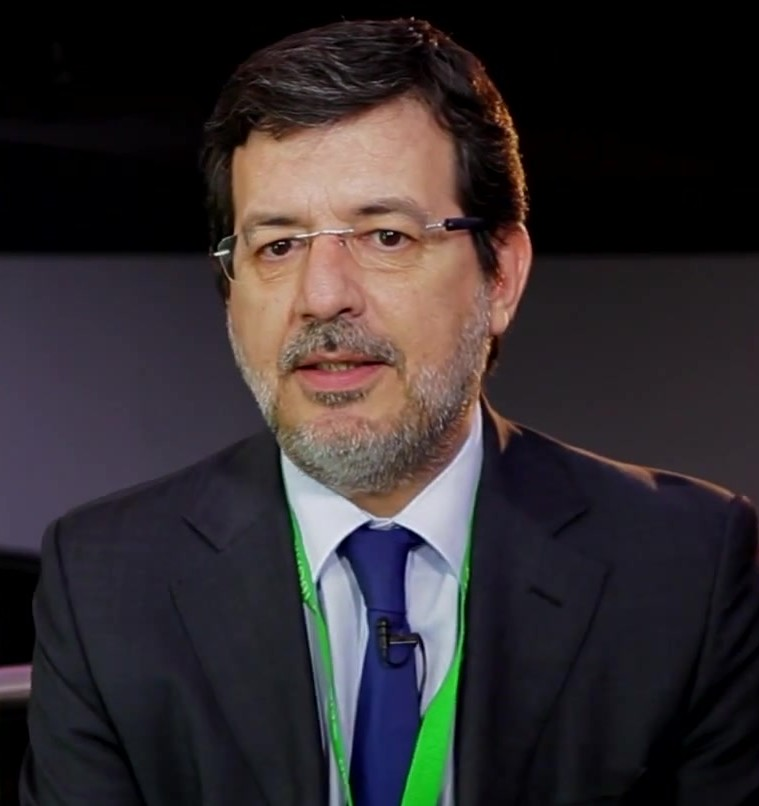
Judge Fernando Andreu led the Spanish investigation into the bombing.

Audiencia Nacional judge Fernando Andreu announced that Spanish legal authorities would conduct an investigation into the attack the day after it took place. Interior minister Rashad al-Alimi said the Yemeni government would cooperate with Spanish investigators. Seven officers from the Joint Police Support Team for Major Terrorist Attacks, composed of TEDAX experts from the National Police and Civil Guard, were sent to Yemen on 4 July to collaborate with Yemeni authorities in the investigation. By then, the Scientific police was already operating in the country. On 6 July, Spanish officials confirmed that a Federal Bureau of Investigation (FBI) unit from the local US embassy had been dispatched to participate in the investigation, primarily to evaluate any potential connections between the perpetrators and insurgent groups in Iraq.

Yemeni president Ali Abdullah Saleh held a press conference discussing the bombing on 3 July. He told reporters that security forces had received information pointing towards an al-Qaeda attack four days prior to the bombing but did not know what was the exact target. Foreign and national interests underwent additional security procedures, but not tourist sites. He claimed the investigation had so far determined that the bomber was a non-Yemeni Arab national and that security forces were prepared to hunt down the perpetrators. He announced a 15 million rial ($82,000 USD) reward for information leading to their killing or capture.

Yemeni investigators spent several days at the site of the attack collecting the remains of those killed. Marib police chief Mohammed al-Ghodra reported later in July that authorities from both countries were coordinating DNA analysis of the remains to deduce the identity of the bomber. On 2 August, the Yemeni state-ran Saba News Agency reported that authorities had positively identified the bomber as Ruhayqah through cross-referenced DNA testing of his remains with that of his relatives. The identities of the 10 individuals responsible for the bombing were also publicly announced. None of them had been arrested by that point.

With Andreu heading the investigation, the Spanish team in Yemen completed an "exhaustive forensic report" on the bombing. A letter rogatory sent by the Audiencia Nacional received a response from their Yemeni counterparts which listed Ruhayqah and eight other individuals as the culprits of the attack. Of the eight, six were killed between August 2007 and November 2008, while Ammar Abadah Nasser al-Wa'eli was set to be tried in absentia in February 2010. The names listed reportedly differed from those provided to the media. Andreu and prosecutor Ana Noé sent more letters rogatory to Yemen for further clarification but they received no response. Facing zero cooperation from Yemeni authorities, the case was provisionally shelved by the Audiencia Nacional in that year on the request of Noé, with none of the perpetrators facing the court.

=== Raids ===
As part of a sweep by authorities across the country which netted 20 Islamists in relation to the bombing, Yemeni security forces raided the residence of Ahmed Bassiouni Dewidar in Sanaa on 5 July. Dewidar was a former Afghan Arab who settled in Yemen during the mid-1990s, unable to return to his native Egypt after being convicted in absentia of being a terrorist during the Returnees from Albania trial. He was previously the subject of an interrogation and a search warrant on 24 June for suspected links to al-Qaeda, but was released due to insufficient evidence. Neighbours characterized him as an ailing man working a regular job and struggling to make ends meet. Yemeni intelligence had been monitoring him for years prior to the raid.

The newspaper Al-Wasat reported according to witnesses that Dewidar's wife told police he was wounded after an initial exchange of fire, whereupon her and her children were allowed to exit and were assured by the authorities that he would be allowed to surrender. Despite this, security forces later resumed the firefight, culminating in a grenade explosion which killed Dewidar. State newspapers reported the next day that he died resisting arrest. A Ministry of Interior statement identified him as an important figure in the al-Qaeda across the Middle East. Several analysts doubted this characterization, with Egyptian terrorism expert Diaa Rashwan pointing out that Arab governments frequently blame terrorist attacks on foreigners. Initially labeled the mastermind of the attack, Dewidar's role was re-evaluated by investigators a month later as simply providing material support as part of the 10-man cell.

Saleh conducted a meeting with Abidah tribal leaders on 5 August demanding an end to the al-Qaeda presence in Marib. The sheikhs provided intelligence used by security forces for a raid on an al-Qaeda safe house in Marib on 8 August. The raid left four militants dead: the ringleader Douha, Naji Ali Jaradan and his brother Abd al-Aziz Said Jaradan, all of whom were implicated in the bombing, as well as a would-be suicide bomber. Initial reports of Qasim al-Raymi being among those killed were later proven false. Although the raid had dismantled the Douha cell, it had little effect on the organization overall. A Yemeni helicopter raid later in August captured nine people in connection to the bombing, including three Yemenis who had recently returned from Iraq.

=== Media investigations ===
I said to him, 'What's the story exactly? I put myself in danger and then I find to my surprise that the operation still took place.' He said to me, 'Don't believe that these people at the top of the pyramid in the country are patriotic or honest people. We are working with a gang and not with a state of law that protects people.'

— Hani Muhammad Mujahid speaking to a Yemeni security agent

An investigation released in June 2015 by Al Jazeera and El País provided an account of the bombing from the perspective of Hani Muhammad Mujahid, who claimed to be a former al-Qaeda member and informant for the Yemeni government. Mujahid denied any involvement in the attack but claimed that he knew the details through his close relationship with Wuhayshi and Raymi. Mujahid said he informed the Political Security Organization and National Security Bureau of the attack a week before it took place, but no action took place to stop it. On the day of the bombing, he stood alongside Wuhayshi, Raymi, Quaiti, and Wa'eli, in the open desert near the temple as they waited for the car bomber to take position. Mujahid snuck away from the group to phone two security agents of the imminent attack. Later in the day, after he learned it had taken place regardless, he expressed his discontent with one of the government handlers he had contacted. He further claimed that multiple individuals were falsely linked to the bombing and killed by Yemeni authorities.

Mujahid offered his testimony to a Spanish court if the case was to be resumed. Esteve Masó, a tourist wounded in the bombing, urged Spanish legal authorities to investigate the claims. Top prosecutor Javier Zaragoza requested that Spanish authorities investigate the newfound information. The revelations were discussed at an Interpol summit in Barcelona, but an attending official doubted that any action could be pursued by the organization, with responsibility for investigating the information instead being upon Yemen's security apparatus.

== Aftermath ==
=== Response ===
==== Yemen ====
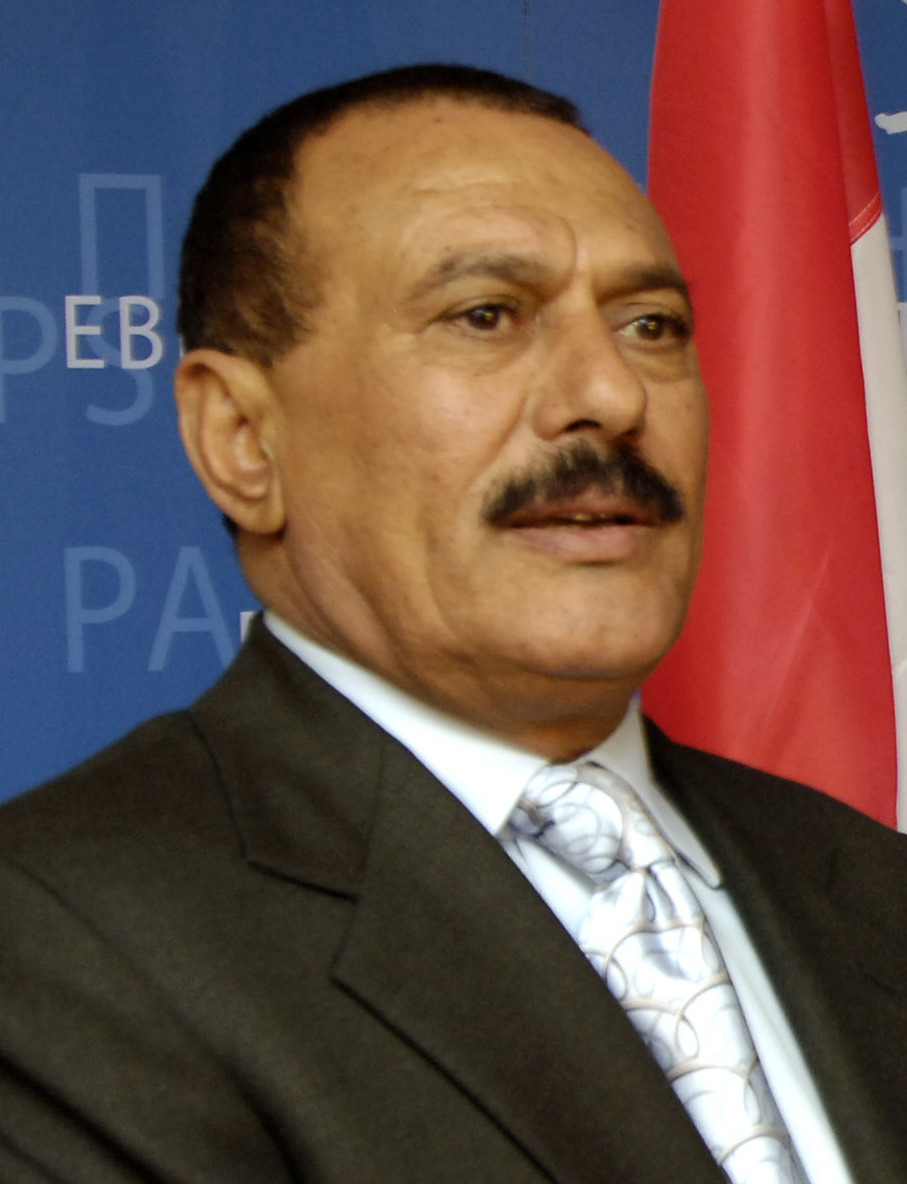
Yemeni president Ali Abdullah Saleh publicly blamed the attack on external actors.

President Saleh contacted Spanish prime minister José Luis Rodríguez Zapatero soon after the attack to express condolences to him. In a speech later in July, he labeled the attack "a crime condemned by all Yemenis, Arab nations and the world," He said the perpetrators "are agents that were recruited by Zionism during the Soviet presence in Afghanistan... Those agents returned home to fight against the interests of their countries, they are traitors who know nothing about Islam, they are ignorant murderers." He was likely referring to Operation Cyclone which provided support for the Afghan mujahideen, including Yemenis and other Afghan Arabs who joined Islamic extremist groups after returning to their home countries.

This was the first fatal terrorist attack in Yemen against tourists. As with previous attacks on foreign interests, Saleh attempted to defuse the pressure by portraying the bombing as a work of external actors, initially labeling the bomber a non-Yemeni and ordering the killing of Dewidar as a response. He "believed a quick reaction to the Marib bombing would buy him time with the international community" but understood the severity of al-Qaeda's resurgence despite the public downplaying, underscored by his meeting with the Abidah sheikhs in August. Interior minister Rashad al-Alimi referred to the attack as "the tax Yemen has to pay for its cooperation on the war against terrorism", urging the international community for more support in that regard.

Reuters reported that "ordinary Yemenis were saddened by the attack", while Gulf News described a condemnatory response. A local tour guide claimed that tribes involved in tourist kidnappings were also displeased by it. Thousands of people, including numerous Yemeni officials, participated in a government-endorsed rally on 6 July in Sanaa denouncing the attack and offering condolences at the Spanish embassy. Later the year, Marib officials had complained of the governorate attracting a negative perception within the country as a stronghold of al-Qaeda due to the bombing and other attacks following it. Marib governor Aref al-Zouki rejected accusations of locals being involved in the bombing and the stereotypes being associated with Marib. Local security director Abi al-Hassan al-Maribi noted that "we find Marib's locals cooperative and they all denounce these acts."

==== Spain ====
The attack drew condemnation and condolences for the victims from officials and politicians in Spain, including foreign minister Miguel Angel Moratinos and King Juan Carlos I. It came shortly after another an Islamist attack in Lebanon killed six Spanish soldiers in June, and coincided with the final day of the trial for the perpetrators of the 2004 Madrid train bombings. A moment of silence was observed in the lower house of the Spanish Parliament. A joint press conference held by Spanish industry, tourism and trade minister Joan Clos and Alimi signaled that the attack would not affect relations between the two countries, and would allow for their strengthening in security cooperation.

A Spanish Air Force plane was sent to Yemen the day of the bombing to repatriate the tourists. They arrived at Torrejón Air Base in Madrid on the morning of 3 July, where five wounded tourists were briefly greeted by their relatives along with foreign minister Miguel Angel Moratinos and Catalonian vice-president Josep-Lluís Carod-Rovira before being transported to Gómez Ulla Military Hospital. Coffins containing those killed were discharged to the Forensic Anatomical Institute for identification. The families of the victims were received by psychologists at the base before heading to a hotel near the Madrid–Barajas Airport, where they were accompanied by social workers from the Directorate General for Victims of Terrorism and Red Cross psychologists. At the hotel, they received and were personally consoled by Prince Felipe and Princess Letizia, along with First Deputy Prime Minister María Teresa Fernández de la Vega.

The body of Vitorica was received at Torrejón Air Base on 15 July. Her funeral was held at the Santa María Parish Church in Amurrio the next day. Among the hundreds attending it were Basque Government spokesperson Miren Azkarate, Deputy General of Álava Ramón Rabanera, Provincial Council president Juan Antonio Zárate, and the president of the Basque Nationalist Party's branch in Álava, Iñaki Gerenabarrena. Vigils and demonstrations took place in numerous cities in Basque Country, including Amurrio, San Sebastián, Bilbao, and Vitoria-Gasteiz.

==== International ====
King Abdullah of Saudi Arabia held a call with Saleh after the attack, condemning it while focusing on counterterrorism cooperation. The attack was condemned internationally, with statements from the foreign ministries of Austria, Chile, France, and Syria, as well as King Abdullah II of Jordan, United States Department of State spokesperson Sean McCormack, and United Nations Secretary-General Ban Ki-moon. Amnesty International similarly condemned the attack and called for the perpetrators to be held responsible "in accordance with international standards."

=== Impact ===
This was the first fatal terrorist attack in Yemen which directly targeted tourists. Saleh predicted a negative impact to the economy and tourism sector, but believed that foreign investment would continue unabated. The attack cast a "cloud of uncertainty" on the local tourism industry, and contributed to the international perception of Yemen shifting to that of a "lawless frontier". Alwan al-Shaibani, head of Universal Tourism Company, the premiere tour operator in Yemen, noted that tourist kidnapping incidents in the past did not usually involve violence, and expressed concern over the effect the unprecedented situation would have on the industry. Arabian Business regarded the attack as significant in light of the tourism industry being developed as an alternative to the Yemeni economy's dependence on oil revenue.

At a press conference held on 12 July, Yemeni tourism minister Nabil Hasan al-Faqih acknowledged a negative effect on the industry but downplayed its severity, reporting just 10 to 20% of Western tourist reservations being cancelled in the aftermath of the attack. He announced the allocation of 200 million rials ($1 million USD) to further promote a positive and peaceful image of Yemen abroad, and agreements with three European tourism companies to help attract tourists. He said the bombing would likely hinder plans to triple tourism revenue by 2010; tourist projections for the rest of 2007 went from a growth of 58,000 visits to just 27,000.

=== Analysis ===
According to analyst Gregory D. Johnsen of the Jamestown Foundation, the attack "painfully illustrated the degree to which al-Qaeda in Yemen has reorganized itself into an effective force," and underscored the threat posed by the second generation of Yemeni militants inspired by the fighting in Iraq. He emphasized the importance of cooperation with tribes in order for the Yemeni government to defeat al-Qaeda, calling the August meeting "an important step". He later cited the attack in an article for The Boston Globe as the finalization of a permanent split between the first and second generation of jihadists, which the Yemeni government exploited by negotiating and cutting deals with the former while eliminating the latter.

A 2011 report by the Combating Terrorism Center at West Point on the history of al-Qaeda in Yemen notes the attack as one of the few which was planned and carried out entirely in Marib. It argues the attack "was notable not because AQAP enjoyed a safe haven in Marib, but rather because it occurred conspicuously without popular backing in al-Rashid Manif."

== See also ==
- Luxor massacre—a similar terrorist attack at an archeological site
