= MV Limburg bombing =

2002 suicide attack on a French oil tanker

- Part of the al-Qaeda insurgency in Yemen
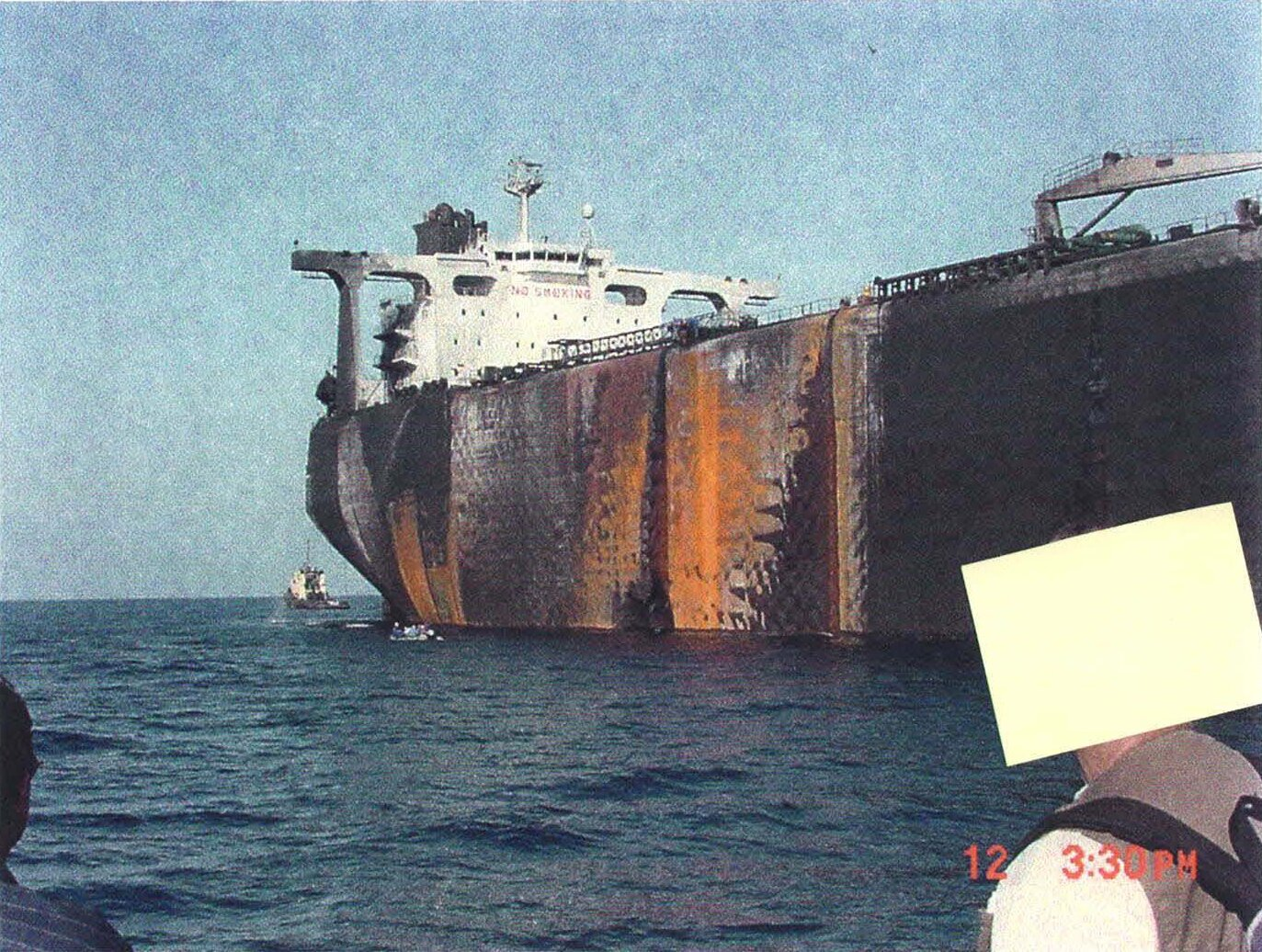
- The MV Limburg after the bombing
- Location: Gulf of Aden, off the coast of the al-Dhabba port, al-Shihr District, Hadhramaut Governorate, Yemen
- Date: 6 October 2002 c. 9:15 a.m. AST (UTC+3)
- Target: MV Limburg
- Attack type: Suicide bombing
- Weapons: Fishing boat laden with TNT and C-4
- Deaths: 3 (including 2 perpetrators)
- Injuries: 12
- Perpetrator: Al-Qaeda in Yemen

The MV Limburg bombing was a suicide attack targeting the MV Limburg, a French-owned oil tanker travelling off the coast of Yemen, on 6 October 2002. At the time of the bombing, the Limburg was preparing to receive a pilot boat to guide it to the al-Dhabba port near Mukalla in order to collect its oil cargo to deliver in Malaysia. At this time, a small fishing boat driven by two men and loaded with explosives was driven into side of the ship, starting a large fire and forcing the crew to eventually abandon it.

Excluding the two suicide bombers, the attack killed one crew member, injured 12, and spilled 90,000 barrels of crude oil into the Gulf of Aden. Yemeni officials initially denied that the explosion was a terrorist attack, but a joint investigation conducted with French authorities and United States Navy officers eventually ruled it as so. Statements made by Osama bin Laden praising the bombing led officials to believe that the attack was conducted by al-Qaeda. A 15-man cell accused of plotting several terrorist attacks in Yemen, including the Limburg bombing, was found guilty of conducting the attack on behalf of al-Qaeda in Yemen (AQY).

== Background ==
In advance to the anniversary of the September 11 attacks, US authorities sent out a warning to commercial shipping companies for potential al-Qaeda attacks on oil tankers travelling through the Persian Gulf and the Horn of Africa. The week of the attack coincided with the second anniversary of the USS Cole bombing, in which two al-Qaeda suicide bombers drove an explosive-laden dingy into the ship while docked in Aden. On the same day as the attack, Al Jazeera broadcast an audio message originally attributed to Osama bin Laden in which he threatened attacks against the United States and its allies which would "target your economic lifeline until you stop your oppression and aggression,". The message was later attributed to al-Qaeda deputy leader Ayman al-Zawahiri.

=== Planning ===
According to the testimony of Ahmed al-Darbi, planning for the bombing began in 2000 as a plot that would sink a civilian oil tanker in the Strait of Hormuz or near the coast of Yemen. With the support of Bin Laden as well as funding by Abd al-Rahim al-Nashiri, a group of Yemenis, some of them trained in Afghanistan a year prior, travelled to Mukalla and rented a house in the city to organize and prepare the attack. Al-Darbi stated that before he was arrested in June 2002, he had bought boats, GPS devices and a hydraulic crane in the United Arab Emirates for usage in the attack. He also said that he had trained the group of Yemenis who planned the attack and obtained visas for them.

Al-Qaeda member Muhsin al-Fadhli stated in an interrogation that he had made contact with senior AQY leader Mohammed al-Ahdal from Kuwait during early 2001 and offered to help plan and finance an attack if he identified potential targets. Al-Ahdal chose the MV Limburg as well as a hotel in Sanaa frequented by US officials. Al-Fadhli raised $127,000 to purchase materials for the attacks and transferred it to an al-Qaeda operative in Saudi Arabia, who then transferred the money to al-Ahdal in April 2002.

== Attack ==
The bombing targeted the MV Limburg, a French-flagged supertanker owned by Euronav which was chartered by Malaysian state-owned oil company Petronas to deliver oil to a refinery in Malacca. According to Yemeni officials the tanker was carrying 397,000 barrels of crude oil from the Kharg Island terminal in Iran, though Euronav stated that it had been loaded from the Ras Tanura harbour in Saudi Arabia. The Limburg was bound for the al-Dhabba port near Mukalla to collect 1.5 million more barrels from its oil refinery, though strong winds from the night of 5 October had caused it to veer farther into the Gulf of Aden. By the morning of 6 October, the tanker was 3 nautical miles from the al-Dhabba port and was preparing to receive a pilot boat to escort it.

At this time, the crew aboard the Limburg spotted a small fishing boat on the starboard (right) side of the ship approaching it at high speed. The boat was manned by two men and was loaded with more than 1,200 kg of TNT and 20 kg of C-4. At approximately 9:15 a.m. AST (UTC+3), immediately after the boat had pulled up next to the starboard of the Limburg, an explosion blasted an 8 metre wide oval-shaped hole though the side of the tanker, penetrated its double hull, and destroyed its second bulkhead. Ship captain Hubert Ardillon said that a fire started shortly after the explosion, followed by "three or four explosions, each 45 minutes apart." According to the ship's second in-command, some of the crew jumped into the sea and were rescued while some "remained [on board to fight the fire] but then also came [onto the land later]." Eleven of the tankers 25 crew members were immediately taken to shore, and by 12:00 p.m. the entire crew had abandoned the ship, unable to stop the blaze. The fire, described as "massive", continued into the night, with a local official describing it as "drifting toward shore under a billowing cloud of acrid, black smoke." The explosion caused about 90,000 barrels of oil to spill into the sea, covering about 45 miles of Yemen's northeastern coastline.

Staff from Canadian oil firm Nexen, which operated an oil storage facility nearby, helped rescue the Limburg's crew and take them to shore. A company tugboat sprayed water at the burning hull of the ship to cool it, and remained near the area to monitor it. With foreign support, Yemeni firefighters extinguished the fire by the morning of 7 October, with the ship leaking only small amounts of oil by the next day. Of the ships 25 crew members, eight French citizens and 17 Bulgarians, 12 sailors received minor injuries and were transported to a hospital in Mukalla. Out of the 25, one Bulgarian shipfitter was reported to be unaccounted for by the end of the day. He was confirmed to be the only casualty in the attack, with his body being recovered by the shore on 8 October.

== Responsibility ==
The Aden-Abyan Islamic Army claimed responsibility for the bombing in a statement sent to Arabic newspaper Asharq al-Awsat on 11 October. The group said that they had originally targeted a US frigate, though the attack on the tanker was "no problem because they are all infidels, and infidelity is one and the same." The US government maintained that al-Qaeda was responsible for perpetrating the bombing. Hadhramaut Governor Abdul Kader Hilal said that the group doesn't have the ability to carry out such an attack, though a member of the group was detained for questioning.

On 14 October, Al Jazeera reported that they had received a written statement attributed to Osama bin Laden seemingly claiming responsibility for the MV Limburg attack. The message was also posted on an Islamist website which had previously carried statements from other al-Qaeda senior leaders. The statement, sent anonymously and dated 12 October, said that the MV Limburg attack as well as the recent attack on US Marines in Kuwait were done to coincide with the anniversary of the US-led invasion of Afghanistan. The statement said:

"By exploding the oil tanker in Yemen, the holy warriors hit the umbilical cord and lifeline of the crusader community, reminding the enemy of the heavy cost of blood and the gravity of losses they will pay as a price for their continued aggression on our community and looting of our wealth."

The statement was unverified by experts and US officials as Bin Laden's status had been unknown for most of the year, with a videotape recorded in November 2001 being the last definitive sign that he was alive.

On 13 November, Al Jazeera broadcast an audio message believed to recorded by Bin Laden in which he praised several al-Qaeda attacks, including the Tunisian synagogue and Bali bombings, the previous Kuwait attack as well as the attack on the MV Limburg. The voice cited the attacks as a warning to Western nations not to participate in any US-led effort against Iraq amid the American government threatening an invasion. US officials strongly believed the recording to be authentic, and had growing suspicions that the previous statement in October may have been genuine.

According to interview transcripts with investigators, suspects in the trial for the Limburg bombing said that they were ordered to conduct the attack by Abu Ali al-Harithi, the leader of al-Qaeda in Yemen.

== Investigation ==
Yemeni authorities and officials initially denied that there was any terrorist attack, instead claiming that fire was the result of an oil leak on the ship, which then lead to the explosion. The state-ran Saba News Agency claimed that the boat which pulled up had next to the Limburg was not a suicide bomber but a pilot boat. Yemeni Transport and Maritime Affairs minister Saeed Yafai said the fire began after a fuel tank on the ship exploded. This was disputed by multiple crew members of the Limburg as well as its captain, who maintained that a boat had driven into the ship and that the fire occurred after the explosion. Euronav director Jacques Moizan said that the tankers double hull could not have been damaged so badly from accidental collision. Peter Rais, director of the Limburg's management company, claimed that it would be "near impossible" for an accidental explosion to occur on the ship.

The same day as the explosion, French President Jacques Chirac announced that their investigators would join local experts in examining the in order to determine the cause of the blast. The French and Yemeni governments agreed to carry out a joint investigation, headed by Saeed Yafai, in which they would cooperate in inspecting the tanker, gathering evidence and information and filing a joint final report on the findings. The US State Department announced on 7 October that members of the Naval Criminal Investigative Service had arrived to assist in the investigation on request of the Yemeni government. A group of four French investigators from the Ministry of Transport arrived at the country on 8 October to begin the investigation. Agents from the French counterterrorism Directorate of Territorial Surveillance would also later be sent.

After an official at the French embassy in Yemen claimed the blast was the result of a terrorist attack, the French Foreign Ministry put out a statement calling for their officials to wait until Yemeni authorities had completed their investigation, though it nonetheless, wouldn't rule out the possibility that the blast was the result of a terrorist attack. One French investigator said that "We in Paris have no clue," and that ""We fear that it is a terrorist act, but we probably need a couple of more days to see what happened." A Malaysian police official stated that they didn't believe the incident to be a terrorist attack on their country, and would not send their own investigative team to Yemen, instead relying on Yemeni and French officials.

Investigators and journalists were brought to view the ship from a small boat on 8 October. The team of French, American and Yemeni technical experts reported that the hull around the blast was bent inwards, suggesting that the explosion had come from an external source driven into the tanker. The team was permitted to visit the Limburg on 9 October. Aboard the ship, investigators found pieces of wood and metallic debris near the area of the explosion and on the deck. French agents determined that the materials were consistent with that of a small boat. A US official stated that "a couple of areas [on the ship] test positive for residue of TNT." The French Foreign Ministry said the initial results of the investigation "appear to lead to the conclusion that the Oct. 6 blast on the French oil tanker Limburg was due to an attack." This view was corroborated by US government officials.

On 16 October, the Yemeni government admitted for the first time that the explosion was a bombing as Interior Minister Rashad al-Alimi confirmed that the investigators "undoubtedly indicate the explosion was a deliberate terrorist act by explosives-laden boat." He also stated that authorities had found the house in Mukalla where the militants had prepared the boat for the bombing.

By 4 November, 20 people had been arrested by Yemeni authorities in connection to the Limburg attack according to the Yemen Times. On 17 November, Kuwaiti officials announced that they had in custody Muhsin al-Fadhli, an al-Qaeda member who confessed to planning the attack on the MV Limburg.

On 20 December, Yemeni security forces executed a raid on a residential building in Mukalla which housed suspected al-Qaeda members involved in the attack. The raid resulted in a gunbattle which killed two police officers and wounded six more, with both suspects Shaker bin Hamel and Abdel Hakem Abduo escaping.

== Trials ==
The trial for a 15-man cell (one of whom was tried in absentia) accused of plotting several al-Qaeda attacks in Yemen began on 29 May 2004. The group, led by key defendant Fawaz al-Rubaiee, was accused of involvement in the MV Limburg bombing, along with an attack on a Hunt Oil helicopter in November 2002, a plot to assassinate the US ambassador to Yemen Edmund Hull and the killing of a Yemeni security officer. Of the group of suspects, five men; 26-year-olds Omar Hassan Jarallah and Fawzi Yahya al-Hababi, 25-year-old Muhammad al-Umda (also known as Muhammad Saeed al-Ammari or Gharib al-Taeezi), 24-year-old Fawzi Muhammad Abdul-Qawi and 27-year-old Yasser Ali Salim, were charged with involvement in the Limburg bombing. The prosecution accused the five men, including Ali Salem who was absent from the trial, with buying the boat used in the attack and loading it with TNT and C-4 explosives. Chief judge Muhammad al-Jarmuzi adjourned the trial until 1 June due to a plea from the defendants to give them additional time to hire lawyers.

Only four lawyers were defending the 14 suspects during a hearing on 7 June. Nine of the suspects were without lawyers after their legal team announced that they had withdrawn from the trial "in the absence of a minimum level of basic justice for this trial", stating that they were denied the ability to copy case files. The lawyers later decided that they would return to defending the suspects during a hearing on 12 June. The trial was adjourned to "give lawyers time to study the case and meet their clients." The trial was again adjourned on 19 June "to allow lawyers to familiarise themselves with the files,", with the next hearing being scheduled to 26 June. During a hearing on 24 July, prosecutors walked out of the trial after the suspects began chanting slogans in support of Osama bin Laden.

The prosecution and defense gave their final statements on 22 August, with the chief judge announcing that the verdict would be issued the next hearing. Chief Prosecutor Saeed al-Aqil demanded the death penalty for seven of the suspects and 10 years of imprisonment for the other seven, while three lawyers defending five of the suspects asked that they be acquitted. The verdict was announced on 28 August, with the judge sentencing the five defendants, including Ali Salem who was still at large, with jail sentences between three and 10 years for the Limburg bombing. Evidence cited included interview transcripts with investigators which state that they attacked the MV Limburg on the order's of Abu Ali al-Harithi, the leader of al-Qaeda in Yemen. All of the defendants appealed the verdict, accusing the judge of bias.

The appeal for the case began in December, with its final hearing being held on 25 December. During the appeal case, ringleader Fawaz al-Rubaiee admitted that he had pledged to Osama bin Laden that he would kill Americans. The appeal's verdict was announced on 5 February 2005, with the judge upholding the death sentence of Hizam Saleh Megalli, who was charged the with murder of a police officer, and upgrading Rubaiee's punishment to the death penalty. The sentences of Jarallah and Abdul-Qawi were increased from 10 to 15 years.

=== Guantanamo military commission ===
Abd al-Rahim al-Nashiri, the suspected mastermind of the USS Cole bombing, was charged by US military prosecutors at the Guantanamo military commission with planning the MV Limburg bombing on 20 April 2011. On 11 August 2014, the judge overseeing al-Nashiri's trial dismissed the charges relating to the Limburg bombing on the grounds that the prosecution did not produce any evidence relating to his involvement. An appellate court later reinstated the charges.

Ahmed al-Darbi, a Saudi national arrested by Azerbaijani police in June 2002 and extradited to Guantanamo Bay that August, was charged by the Guantanamo military commission in December 2007 with training and acting as a weapons instructor in an al-Qaeda camp in Afghanistan during the 1990s and planning an attack on a civilian vessel travelling through the Strait of Hormuz or near the coast of Yemen from 2000 until his arrest. In August 2012, US military prosecutors filed additional charges for approval by the Pentagon accusing al-Darbi of planning and abetting the attack on the MV Limburg. The charges were approved and proceeded with on 5 February 2014.

On 20 February 2014, al-Darbi pleaded guilty to the charges, admitting his role in the bombing and agreeing to testify against Abd al-Rahim al-Nashiri. Al-Darbi delivered a videotape testimony against al-Nashiri relating to his involvement in the Cole bombing and against a Guantanamo prisoner accused of planning attacks on ISAF forces in Afghanistan between 2002 and 2006. He was later sentenced to 13 years of imprisonment, the minimum punishment available due to his cooperation with the prosecution. As part of his plea deal, he was transferred to a prison in Saudi Arabia on 2 May 2018.

== Impact ==
=== Economic ===
The attack, which occurred amid the prelude to the invasion of Iraq, prompted concerns of further disruption towards the oil industry. Pira Energy Group chief executive Gary Ross instead called the prospect a "scare story", claiming that the attack ''would put everyone on heightened alert and raise insurance rates, but it wouldn't materially affect supply.'' Oil market specialist Lawrence Eagles said the motive of the attack may have been to "disrupt shipping, and create maximum economic chaos". He further added that if the incident was confirmed to be a terrorist attack "I would expect the oil price to move up in nervousness more than anything else. It's not likely to cause a global oil shortage, but it will highlight the sentiment that the military build-up in the Middle East is likely to be damaging in a wider sense than just Iraq."

During morning trading on 7 October, the price for Brent Crude had risen to a high of US$28.60 per barrel, though its value had decreased to $28.20 by the end of the day. On 8 October, oil prices for November delivery increased by only two cents to $29.64 on the New York Mercantile Exchange. Oil traders and industry said the small change "was evidence that global markets over the last month or so had taken account of the prospect of attacks on tankers in the Middle East". Cambridge Energy Research Associates director Vera de Ladoucette said the low reaction was a result of the attack only targeting a single tanker rather than an oil field, a pipeline or an export facility.

A fact sheet published by the US State Department on 8 November said that the attack "dealt a serious blow to Yemen's shipping industry." Insurance premiums for ships coming into Yemeni ports were increased by 300% by underwriters. Insurance prices for cargo coming into Yemen were raised to $500 per each 40' container and $250 per each 20' container. In response to the increases, the Yemeni Ministry of Transport and Maritime Affairs issued a statement in which they assured the international shipping community that all ports in the country were safe and that said increases were "unreasonable." As a result of the increased expenses, many vessels rerouted from Yemen to competitor ports in Djibouti, Saudi Arabia and Oman. The Aden Container Port and the Hodeidah Shipping and Transport Company, two of Yemen's biggest ports, reported a 50% decrease in port activity. These effects resulted in Yemen losing approximately US$3.8 million in monthly port revenue. By 23 December, the Ministry of Transport and Maritime Affairs declared that actual losses since the attack had reached $7.7 million.

Magnus Ranstorp from the Centre for the Study of Terrorism and Political Violence interpreted the MV Limburg bombing as well as the Bali bombings as a new phase of al-Qaeda's attacks which would prioritize economic targets in order to undermine global trade and stability. He called both attacks a success, citing "enormous impacts on the insurance sectors, certain stock exchanges and the Southeast Asian tourism industry."

=== Security ===
In response to the bombing, the Yemeni government showed an increased interest in establishing a coast guard force. US Central Command general Tommy Franks conducted a meeting with Yemeni President Ali Abdullah Saleh in Sanaa on 17 October, during which he reaffirmed the US's willingness to support Yemen in establishing a coast guard to prevent terrorism. During a press conference at the US embassy, Franks noted the requirement of a coast guard for the country due to its long coastline, and use the Limburg bombing as an example of terrorists exploiting the lack of security along it. During the conference, Franks announced that the US would be gifting the Yemeni government nine patrol boats which would arrive by the next summer, and that an American expert would be working with the Yemeni coast guard authority. He also stated that Yemeni officers were being trained by the US in English, and that by the end of the year they would receive coast guard training in either Yemen or Europe.

The Yemeni Coast Guard was officially established in 2003. By May 2005, the Coast Guard consisted of 1,200 officers, 40 boats and six bases, and had an annual budget of $11 million.

== Aftermath ==
On 3 November, a CIA drone strike on a car travelling through Marib killed six al-Qaeda-linked individuals, including Abu Ali al-Harithi, the leader of al-Qaeda in Yemen who planned and ordered the attack on the Limburg.

On 6 February 2006, 23 members of al-Qaeda escaped from a Political Security Organization prison in Sanaa. Among the escapees included Fawaz al-Rubaiee, Umar Hassan Jarallah, and Muhammad al-Umda, all of whom were convicted for participating in the Limburg bombing. On 15 September of that year, Jarallah would kill himself in a suicide bombing along with another militant in an al-Qaeda attack on an oil facility in Marib. Rubaiee, a key planner in the attack, was later killed in a raid by Yemeni security forces in October. Al-Umda was killed by a US drone strike in 2012.

== See more ==
- USS Cole bombing
