= 2006 Sanaa prison escape =

Tunnel escape of 23 convicts in Yemen

- Part of the al-Qaeda insurgency in Yemen
- Tunnel dug by the fugitives for their escape. The arrows in the image point to various tools used in digging the tunnel.
- Date: 3 February 2006
- Time: 4:30 (AST)
- Location: Haddah, Sanaa, Yemen
- Escaped prisoners: 23

On 3 February 2006, a group of 23 convicts escaped from a prison administered by the Political Security Organization (PSO) in Sanaa, Yemen. The prisoners had spent two months digging a 44-meter long tunnel from their cell, which they had all shared, using makeshift tools such as spoons and cooking pots. They escaped through the tunnel into the women's bathroom of a nearby mosque, where they recited prayers and left through the front doors. Among the escapees included several militants affiliated with al-Qaeda and its local organization in Yemen, most notably Jamal al-Badawi, a mastermind of the USS Cole bombing, Fawaz al-Rabeiee, the leader of a militant cell responsible for the MV Limburg bombing, and Jaber Elbanah, a US citizen associated with the Lackawanna Six.

The escape was a major embarrassment for the Yemeni government and strained its counterterrorism-focused relations with the United States. Several commentators and officials suspected that members of the PSO may have facilitated the escape. An investigation launched by the Yemeni Interior Ministry concluded that the prison guards did not take sufficient precautions to prevent the escape, with 12 officers being tried and found guilty of gross negligence. Yemeni authorities and security forces launched an intense manhunt for the 23 fugitives, with all but six of them remaining free by late 2007. Retrospectively, the escape has been seen by commentators and analysts as the catalyst for the revival of al-Qaeda's presence in Yemen. Two of the escapees, Nasir al-Wuhayshi and Qasim al-Raymi, would go on to serve as leaders of al-Qaeda in Yemen and its successor organization, al-Qaeda in the Arabian Peninsula.

== Context ==
Al-Qaeda in Yemen was effectively eliminated as a threat by late 2003. The killing of leader Abu Ali al-Harithi in 2002 along with the arrest of his successor Muhammad al-Ahdal the following year devastated the organization's infrastructure. A crackdown on the rest of the group's membership and local Islamists generally preferring to travel to Iraq to participate in the insurgency against US forces left al-Qaeda in Yemen mostly dormant.

With al-Qaeda relatively contained the Yemeni government shifted its focus elsewhere, primarily to the Houthi war in Saada Governorate, which began in June 2004. President Ali Abdullah Saleh viewed the Houthis as a legitimate threat to his power rather than al-Qaeda, which was seen primarily as an issue for the West. Simultaneously, the United States also perceived al-Qaeda to be neutralized in the country, and began shifting its foreign policy to pressuring Saleh into undertaking political reform and removal of corruption. Counterterrorism-focused ambassador Edmund Hull left the country in mid-2004.

== Escape ==
All 23 fugitives were kept in a single cell part of a below-surface prison underneath the PSO headquarters in Sanaa. The escape was likely inspired by the foiled tunnel escape in Camp Bucca, Iraq, the previous year. The plan could have initially came from an escapee from Iraq who had described the attempt in Camp Bucca to the rest of the fugitives, or by a colluding visitor who had read about it on the internet.

Initial estimates reported that the tunnel may have taken approximately two months to have complete. Several improvised tools were used to dig the tunnel, such as soccer balls, shovels made from fan parts and spoons attached to broomsticks, and a u-shaped scoop made from three cookings pots attached to each other. Authorities found four soccer balls with plastic tubing attached to them, producing a device which allowed the inmates to breathe below surface while they were digging. Dirt from the tunnel was removed using two buckets and a rope, and was hidden in various parts of the cell, such as under clothing piles and in the bathrooms, one of which was filled to its ceiling.

The prisoners kicked a soccer ball in their cell and recited loud chants as they were digging in order to mask the sound of their work. In one instance, the prisoners attacked an officer and soldier who attempted to enter their ward in order to quell the chants. The tunnel itself was 60 by 80 centimeters wide, 44 meters-long, almost a third being within prison grounds, and went down 3 meters below the cell's surface. The southern wall of the prison, the direction in which the tunnel was dug, was 40 meters away from the cell of the prisoners. A 12-meter dead-end street then separated the wall with the al-Awkaf Mosque. Several guards outside the prison reported sounds of digging at different places and times, though their reports were not investigated any further.

On 3 February, at around 4:30 AST, the escapees each crawled through the tunnel and breached the floor of the women's bathroom of the mosque, the least frequented part of the building as most Muslim women pray at home. They proceeded to recite morning prayers in the mosque and then left through the front doors among the attendants. The hole in the bathroom was eventually discovered by the mosque's janitor. He informed the imam who later notified authorities, who had realized the escape by the next day.

== Escapees ==
The Ministry of Interior distributed a list containing the identities for 22 of the 23 escaped convicts on 3 February. The Jamestown Foundation identifies the 23 fugitives as:

- Jamal al-Badawi, a central facilitator of the USS Cole bombing who was sentenced to death on 29 September 2004 for his role in the attack. He had previously escaped from an Aden prison in April 2003 alongside nine other suspects involved in the bombing, before being apprehended in March 2004.
- Fawaz al-Rabeiee, the ringleader of a 15-man al-Qaeda cell responsible for several attacks and plots, including the attempted shootdown of a Hunt Oil helicopter and the MV Limburg bombing. Initially sentenced to 10 years of imprisonment in August 2004, his sentence was adjusted to the death penalty by an appeal court in February 2005.
- Umar Saeed Jarallah, Muhammed al-Umda and Fawzi al-Wajayhi, members of Rabeiee's cell sentenced to prison in August 2004 for involvement in the MV Limburg bombing. Jarallah's sentence was raised to 15 years in an appeal in February 2005, while the sentences of Umda and Wajayhi were upheld at 10 years.
- Ibrahim al-Huwaydi, Aref Saleh Mujali, Muhammad al-Daylami and Qasim al-Raymi, tried as part of Rabeiee's cell and found guilty in August 2004 for attempting to launch bombings against several diplomatic embassies in Sanaa and to assassinate then US ambassador Hull. Their sentences of 5 years in prison were upheld in February 2005.
- Hizam Saleh Mujali, sentenced to death in August 2004 as part of Rabeiee's cell for the murder of a police officer in 2002.
- Ibrahim Mohammed al-Muqri, Abdullah Yahya al-Wadai, Mansur Nasser al-Bayhani and Shafiq Ahmad Zayd, charged as part of an 11-man cell accused of forging passports, possession of weapons and explosives, planning to travel to Iraq as foreign fighters and "setting up an armed group to carry out attacks in Yemen". The former three were convicted only of false passports in March 2005, while Muqri was cleared of all charges. Despite this, the four men all remained imprisoned together until the escape.
- Khaled Mohammed al-Batati and Abdulrahman Basurah, part of an eight-man cell of the "Kataib al-Tawhid" militant group led by Iraqi national Anwar al-Jilani. In August 2005, the group was found guilty of planning to attack the British and Italian embassies as well as the French cultural center in Sanaa. Batati was sentenced to three years and two months in prison and Basurah was sentenced to three years and four months.
- Abdullah Ahmad al-Raymi, arrested in Qatar for fighting US forces in Afghanistan before he was extradited to Yemen in 2005 and sentenced to four years in prison for forging documents.
- Jaber Elbanah, a US citizen affiliated with the Lackawanna Six who was arrested by Yemeni authorities in late 2003 in connection to the investigation into Rabeiee.
- Nasir al-Wuhayshi, a veteran al-Qaeda member who was arrested in Iran after fleeing Afghanistan in the aftermath of the Battle of Tora Bora. He was extradited to Yemen by Iran in November 2003, where he was held without being officially charged for any crime before his escape.
- Hamza al-Quaiti, Zakariya Hasan al-Bayhani and Zakariya Ubadi Qasim al-Yafai, extradited from Saudi Arabia in 2003 without any charges.
- Yasser Nasser al-Hamayqani, charged with travelling to Iraq.

== Investigation ==
Officials from the Ministry of Interior conducted an emergency meeting shortly after the escape. On 4 February it was announced that an investigation led by the Interior Minister was underway to determine if the fugitives had received any internal or external assistance. The investigation was being headed by the National Security Bureau, the PSO's rival intelligence organization.

Officials maintaining the prison were reshuffled by authorities as the chief and his deputy were both dismissed. PSO officers and soldiers were being investigated on the grounds that the prisoners could not have determined the direction and angle at which the tunnel was dug to the mosque without support from highly qualified individuals. A report on the investigation ran by a pro-government newspaper said that the prison guards did not take adequate steps to ensure that an escape would not occur. Outside co-conspirators were also found to have "helped in moving and hiding the escapees", according to an official. Five PSO majors and two prison guards were taken in for interrogation on 10 February on suspicions that they gave tools and information to the prisoners to assist their escape.

Over 80 people were detained for the investigation, including prison officers, relatives of the escaped convicts and individuals affiliated with Islamist organizations. On 15 February, an official stated that 135 people had been arrested and interrogated on the grounds that they may have information on the location of the fugitives. Authorities received "important information" from the detainees, who were taken in police searches of suspected places and houses of relatives of the fugitives. An American request to interrogate the detainees was rejected by Yemeni authorities on the grounds that it was a breach of their national sovereignty.

On 21 February, the investigative committee published its official report on the escape, charging several prison officials with gross negligence allowing the jailbreak to happen. On 27 April, officials confirmed that the suspects would be put on trial after the investigation was complete. They also stated that the individuals would be tried in a military court. On 25 May, attorney general Abdullah al-Olufi reported that a military court had put 12 intelligence officers on trial, charging them with negligence resulting in the escape. Four of them were found guilty of direct involvement in the escape, while the rest were convicted of charges relating to negligence. On 12 July, the officers were bestowed sentences between eight months to three years of imprisonment. All of them were discharged from the PSO, though they retained their pensions and remuneration.

== Reactions ==
The escape has been described as a major embarrassment for the Yemeni government, and a significant blow to its campaign against al-Qaeda. The US ambassador to Yemen, Thomas C. Krajeski, called it a major setback in the counterterrorism partnership between the two nations. Retrospectively, the event is seen as the beginning of a period of mistrust in relations between Yemen and the US. US officials were particularly angered with the fact that Badawi was among the escapees, as he was involved in an attack on a US Navy warship and had escaped from prison once before. Shortly after the escape, State Department spokesperson Sean McCormack emphasized to the Yemeni government the importance of capturing the fugitives and offered assistance if requested. Speaking at a press conference on 9 February, Homeland Security Advisor Frances Townsend said:

I find the developments in Yemen not only deeply disappointing, but of enormous concern to us, especially given the capabilities and the expertise of the people who were there. We are disappointed that they were all housed together. We are disappointed that their restrictions in prison weren't more stringent. We have spoken with our colleagues in Yemen through our ambassador and expressed this to them and asked them for the strongest and most transparent cooperation so that we can help them.

Several former US officials alleged that the escape was facilitated in some way by elements within the Yemeni government. Suspicion fell particularly on the PSO due to its history of unreliability as well as the fact that it had assisted hundreds of Yemenis in joining the Afghan mujahideen and absorbed many former jihadists after the Soviet–Afghan War, potentially compromising it with internal al-Qaeda sympathizers. An anonymous US official described to Newsweek a cable from the US embassy in Sanaa which mentioned "the lack of obvious security measures on the streets" and deduced that "PSO insiders must have been involved." A European counterterrorism official called the escape "impossible ... without any involvement of prisons guards, prison administration, etc."

== Aftermath ==
Security checkpoints were established across Sanaa shortly after the escape in an attempt to apprehend the fugitives before they could flee the area. Regardless, most of the escapees had successfully fled into the mountainous, tribal-dominated southern and eastern areas of Yemen, where they were out of the government's oversight and could receive protection from the local tribes. The Yemeni government launched searches primarily in Abyan Governorate, as well as in Sanaa and several other areas in the country perceived as Islamist strongholds. Authorities distributed photos and information on the suspects to multiple cities, villages and districts in all Yemeni governorates. The Ministry of Interior offered a reward of YER 5 million in exchange for information on the escapees, and created an anonymous phone line for those who wanted to provide tip-offs. Yemeni television also aired the mugshots of the 23 escapees.

On 5 February, Interpol issued a global security alert for the escapees, calling them a "clear and present danger to all countries" and urging the Yemeni government to provide the names, photos and fingerprints of the individuals. The organization later stated that it had not issued the highest level notice possible as it was yet to receive fingerprints and arrest warrants for the fugitives from the Yemeni government.

The US Navy issued a statement on 9 February reporting that its ships, as part of the Dutch-led multinational Combined Task Force 150, were "monitoring international waters along the coast of Yemen in an attempt to either block possible maritime escape routes or capture the suspected terrorists if they make this attempt." On 23 February, the Federal Bureau of Investigation (FBI) added Badawi and Elbanah to its Most Wanted Terrorists list, while Abdullah al-Raymi was included in the Seeking Information – Terrorism list.

After the escape, a split eventually materialized between the older and younger generations of the escapees. The older generation managed to reach agreements with the Yemeni government allowing them freedom if they agreed not to conduct any attacks within the country. This was the case with the capture of Badawi in October 2007. Badawi pledged loyalty to the Yemeni President and agreed to assist in locating five of the other escapees in return for being freed from captivity. On the other hand, the younger generation rejected negotiations with the government and continued fighting against it and evading captivity. By late 2007, six of the 23 fugitives were dead (one being killed in Somalia after turning himself in and being released), 11 were in the custody of authorities and 6 were free, including Badawi. By 2010, only four escapees, Umda, Wuhayshi, Badawi and Qasim al-Raymi, were still free. They would eventually be killed by US drone strikes in 2012, 2015, 2019 and 2020, respectively.

Timeline of escapee capture or death
Name	Capture or death	Date
Zakariya Ubadi Qasim al-Yafai	Captured by authorities in a raid in Sanaa	17 April 2006
Khaled Mohammed al-Batati	Turned himself in to authorities	21 or 22 April 2006
Fawzi Mohammed al-Wajayhi	Turned himself in to authorities	Before 27 April 2006
Ibrahim Mohammed al-Muqri	Surrendered to authorities	Before 27 April 2006
Abdullah Ahmad al-Raymi	Captured by authorities in Marib Governorate	12 May 2006
Aref Saleh Mujali	Surrendered to authorities after tribal mediation	29 August 2006
Hizam Saleh Mujali	Surrendered to authorities alongside Aref Saleh Mujali after tribal mediation	29 August 2006
Shafiq Ahmad Zayd	Killed himself as part of an al-Qaeda suicide attack	15 September 2006
Umar Saeed Jarallah	Killed himself as part of an al-Qaeda suicide attack	15 September 2006
Fawaz al-Rabeiee	Killed by security forces in a raid in Sanaa	1 October 2006
Muhammad al-Daylami	Killed alongside Fawaz al-Rabeiee	1 October 2006
Mansur Nasser al-Bayhani	Turned himself in to authorities	Late 2006
Zakariya Hasan al-Bayhani	Turned himself in to authorities alongside Mansur Nasser al-Bayhani	Late 2006
Yasser Nasser al-Hamayqani	Killed in shootout with police in Abyan Governorate	15 January 2007
Abdulrahman Basurah	Turned himself in to authorities	May 2007
Jaber Elbaneh	Surrendered to authorities	14 May 2007
Jamal al-Badawi	Surrendered to authorities	17 October 2007
Abdullah Yahya al-Wadai	Surrendered to authorities some time before 24 October 2007	Before 24 October 2007
Ibrahim al-Huwaydi	Surrendered to authorities after tribal mediation	23 February 2008
Hamza al-Quaiti	Killed in a raid by security forces in Tarim, Hadhramaut Governorate	11 August 2008
Muhammed al-Umda	Killed by a US drone strike in Marib Governorate	22 April 2012
Nasir al-Wuhayshi	Killed by a US drone strike in Hadhramaut Governorate	12 June 2015
Qasim al-Raymi	Killed by a US drone strike in al-Bayda Governorate	29 January 2020

== Impact ==
The escape is widely seen as a turning point in al-Qaeda's insurgency in Yemen, and the origin of its contemporary organization in the country, al-Qaeda in the Arabian Peninsula. Among the 23 escapees, the US concentrated heavily on the capture of Badawi and Elbanah as they were on the FBI's most wanted list. However, the two who would make the largest impact would be Wuhayshi and Qasim al-Raymi. Wuhayshi, who studied Islam and was a close ally of Osama bin Laden in Afghanistan, became a spiritual leader for the fugitives while they were imprisoned, while Raymi lead prayers for the group, gave religious sermons on Fridays, and negotiated with the prison's administration. Wuhayshi, Raymi and the militants who followed them have been referred to as the "second generation" of al-Qaeda in Yemen.

In the aftermath of the escape, Wuhayshi became the leader of al-Qaeda in Yemen, being declared so in an announcement in mid-2007. Along with Raymi, who was appointed as military commander, the two reorganized and rebuild the group throughout 2007 and 2008. Al-Qaeda in Yemen launched increasingly deadlier attacks in the aftermath of the escape, such as pair of suicide attacks on two oil facilities in September 2006, a car bombing in Marib in 2007 and an attack on the US embassy in Sanaa in 2008. Wuhayshi and Raymi would be among the founding members of al-Qaeda in the Arabian Peninsula in January 2009. Under Wuhayshi's leadership from 2009 to 2015, the group would come to be known as al-Qaeda's strongest affiliate, Wuhayshi himself being identified as the second highest-ranking leader of al-Qaeda entirely. After his death from a US drone strike, Raymi succeeded him as leader from 2015 until his own death from a drone strike in 2020.

== See also ==
- 2023 Nouakchott prison break
- 2011 Sarpuza prison escape
