= Al-Qaeda in Yemen =

Salafi jihadist group in Yemen

- تنظيم القاعدة في اليمن; Tanẓīm al-Qā‘idah fī Yemen
- Flag used by the group from 2008 onwards
- Other name: Al-Qaeda in the Southern Arabian Peninsula (March 2008 – January 2009)
- Founder: Abd al-Rahim al-Nashiri (POW)
- Leaders: Abu Ali al-Harithi X (1998–2002); Muhammad al-Ahdal (POW) (2002–2003); Nasir al-Wuhayshi (2006–2009)
- Dates active: 1998–2003, 2006–2009
- Groups: Al-Qaeda in Yemen; Soldiers' Brigades of Yemen
- Active regions: Yemen
- Ideology: Sunni Islamism; Salafi Jihadism; Anti-Westernism; Anti-Americanism; Anti-Zionism; Antisemitism
- Size: 20 members, 100 sympathizers (2002 estimate); Low hundreds (2008 estimate)
- Part of: Al-Qaeda
- Wars: War on terror Al-Qaeda insurgency in Yemen

Al-Qaeda in Yemen (AQY), (Note: Arabic: تنظيم القاعدة في اليمن, romanized: Tanẓīm al-Qā‘idat fī Yemen) later known as al-Qaeda in the Southern Arabian Peninsula (AQSAP) (Note: Arabic: تنظيم القاعدة في جنوب شبه الجزيرة العربية, romanized: Tanẓīm al-Qā‘idat fī Junub Shibh al-Jazīrat al-‘Arab. Also translated as al-Qaeda in the South of the Arabian Peninsula.) from March 2008 onwards, was a Sunni Islamist militant organization which operated as al-Qaeda's local affiliate in Yemen. The group operated in two iterations; once between 1998 and 2003, and from 2006 to 2009.

Al-Qaeda activity in Yemen first began as Abdul Rahim al-Nashiri received permission from Osama bin Laden to plan an attack in the country in 1998. Some time between then and before 2000, Bin Laden also authorized Abu Ali al-Harithi to travel to Yemen and begin planning attacks. Harithi would be recognized as the leader of AQY, which was characterized as a collection of al-Qaeda cells which organized around discrete terrorist plots and aiding the international al-Qaeda network. Nashiri's planning would culminate in the USS Cole bombing in October 2000. The bombing, which was followed by the September 11 attacks a year later, lead to the Yemeni government launching a significant counterterrorism campaign against AQY. The group would perpetrate another high-profile bombing in October 2002 against the French oil tanker MV Limburg, but a drone strike the month after killed Harithi, providing a significant blow to the group's operational capacity. After a further crackdown by Yemeni authorities and the arrest of the group's replacement leader, Mohammad Hamdi al-Ahdal, in November 2003, the first iteration of AQY was effectively defeated.

The second iteration of AQY emerged in the aftermath of the 2006 Sanaa prison escape, which freed a number of al-Qaeda figures. The prison break occurred during the emergence of a second, more radical generation of jihadists in Yemen, which showed greater ambition than their older counterparts and rejected any dialogue with the Yemeni government. This generation coalesced around the leadership of escapees Nasir al-Wuhayshi and Qasim al-Raymi, both al-Qaeda veterans from Afghanistan. Wuhayshi, Bin Laden's former secretary, rebuild AQY in a way which would allow it to withstand leadership losses which had destroyed it beforehand. The group would launch an unsuccessful double-suicide car bombing in September 2006. Wuhayshi was formally declared leader of the group in June 2007, before a suicide bombing a month later killed eight Spanish tourists. 2008 saw the release of the group's e-magazine Sada al-Malahem, along with the emergence of the Soldiers' Brigades of Yemen, a splinter faction which launched a string of unsophisticated attacks throughout the year. It was also during the year that AQY renamed itself to al-Qaeda in the Southern Arabian Peninsula (AQSAP). In September 2008, the group launched an attack on the United States embassy in Sanaa, killing 19 people in what was its most complex operation to date.

In January 2009, AQSAP announced its merger with al-Qaeda's affiliate in Saudi Arabia to form al-Qaeda in the Arabian Peninsula (AQAP).

== History ==
=== 1998–2000: Establishment and USS Cole bombing ===
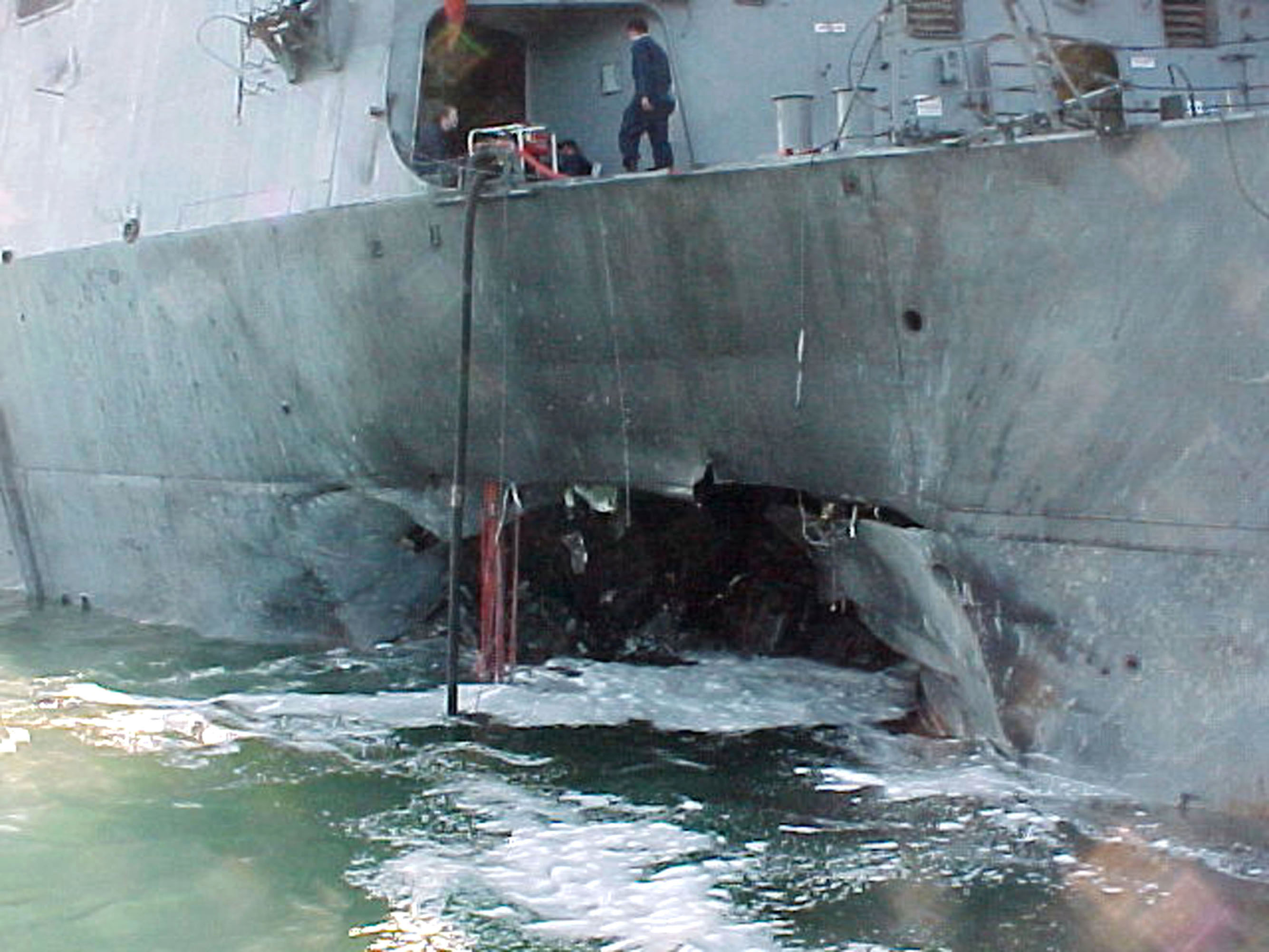
The USS Cole after the bombing

Al-Qaeda's first large-scale plot in Yemen originated in late 1998 when Abdul Rahim al-Nashiri, a former Saudi mujahideen who joined al-Qaeda earlier in the year, proposed to Osama Bin Laden an attack on a United States Navy vessel after observing them docked without protection in the Port of Aden. Bin Laden approved Nashiri's plan, agreeing to fund the operation and designating him as al-Qaeda's head of operations in the Persian Gulf and East Africa. Separately, between 1997 and before 2000, Bin Laden ordered Yemeni militant and close associate Abu Ali al-Harithi to return to Yemen and begin plotting attacks. Harithi would come to be recognized by US counterterrorism officials as the highest-ranking leader among al-Qaeda operatives in Yemen.

Nashiri's plan would first be attempted on 3 January 2000 as an attack against the USS The Sullivans while it was refueling at Aden. The bombing was a failure as the boat loaded with explosives sank before it reached the warship. The plan was successfully executed on 12 October 2000, when two militants on an explosive-laden boat drove up to and bombed the USS Cole while at the Port of Aden, killing 17 American sailors.

Despite its success, the attack "appears to have been more an example of opportunism than a sign of an enduring al-Qaeda presence in Yemen" according to the Combating Terrorism Center. The two purported masterminds of the attack, Nashiri and Walid bin Attash, were more closely associated to al-Qaeda central in Afghanistan rather than the cell in Yemen. The two suicide bombers in the attack held no connections to the leadership of AQY, and local coordinator Fahd al-Quso played no role in further AQY operations. Only fellow local coordinator Jamal al-Badawi would be identified as having continued involvement in AQY until 2006. Harithi is sometimes labeled a key planner or mastermind of the attack, including by the US government, though there is less evidence to support this accusation compared to what exists for Nashiri and Attash. Harithi and his operatives, including AQY deputy leader Muhammad Hamdi al-Ahdal, provided support to the cell led by Nashiri.

=== 2001–2003: Pressure and decline ===
Under significant pressure from the US due to the Cole attack the previous year as well as the September 11 attacks, Yemeni President Ali Abdullah Saleh decided to crack down on jihadists and coordinate counterterrorism operations with the support of the US. AQY would engage in few significant activities or propaganda efforts during 2001. Between August and November, Harithi and Ahdal would reside in the village of al-Hosun in the tribal areas of Marib Governorate. Yemeni special forces would raid the village on 18 December 2001 in an attempt to capture the two, leading to clashes with local tribesmen resulting in the deaths of 19 soldiers. The raid "effectively flushed them [AQY] from their traditional strongholds" in Marib.

In 2002, US ambassador Edmund Hull described AQY as "a number of cells" which "are active and play important roles in the international al-Qaeda network". He listed "three or four" definitive al-Qaeda figures in the group, including Harithi and Ahdal, who can "draw up on support from others. So it's more extensive than that". Discussing the group's operational capacity, he said that "they can acquire explosives; they can acquire other arms. They can put it together in an effective explosive device. And they can identify targets and plan effectively against targets". However, he also said that, due to Yemeni counterrorism efforts, AQY had not increased in numbers significantly since the September 11 attacks. Yemeni officials and Western analysts believed that the group consisted of "about 20 committed terrorists and another 100 or so sympathizers who might help organize attacks."

In January 2002, a US soldier in Afghanistan uncovered an al-Qaeda document outlining a potential attack against the US embassy in Sanaa. Included in the document was the name of Yemeni al-Qaeda member Fawaz al-Rabeiee. The FBI identified 16 associates of Rabeiee, including one whose brother was imprisoned at Camp X-Ray, who told them that an attack was imminent in Yemen. On 11 February 2002, the FBI issued an alert warning of a potential attack against the US or its interests in Yemen by the group led by Rabeiee. It later dropped their search for six of the individuals four days later as they were already imprisoned. On 13 February, al-Qaeda member and brother in-law of one of the wanted individuals, Sameer Muhammad Ahmed al-Hada, blew himself up with a grenade while attempting to flee Yemeni authorities. He was the son of fellow Yemeni al-Qaeda operative Ahmad Mohammad Ali al-Hada.

On 6 October 2002, AQY launched their second major attack, a suicide bombing targeting the French oil tanker MV Limburg. In a similar vein to the USS Cole bombing, suicide bombers drove a small explosive-laden boat into the side of the Limburg, killing one crew member and spilling thousands of oil barrels into the Gulf of Aden. Despite yielding a less successful outcome, the bombing represented a turning point in AQY as a locally based al-Qaeda affiliate, with a cell led by Rabeiee undergoing the planning and execution of the attack. Many participants in the Limburg bombing would come to hold high-ranking positions in AQY's later iteration. Rabeiee later organized a second cell for the attempted shootdown of a Hunt Oil helicopter using rocket-propelled grenades and small arms on 3 November 2002, injuring one person.

On the same day, the CIA launched a drone strike on a car travelling through the al-Naqaa desert in Marib Governorate, killing four militants from the al-Qaeda-linked Aden-Abyan Islamic Army, Lackawanna Six ringleaderKamal Derwish and Abu Ali al-Harithi. The death of AQY's leader proved a significant blow to the organization, which subsequently had dozens of its supporters detained by Yemeni authorities through late 2002 and early 2003 and experienced a "precipitous membership decline" by the end of the year. Fawaz al-Rabeiee was arrested along with 10 other militants on 28 March 2003. Muhammed al-Ahdal, who replaced Harithi as AQY's leader, was arrested on 25 November 2003 in a sting operation through a tip from an AQY member. The capture of al-Ahdal effectively resulted the defeat of AQY's first iteration, with most Yemeni militants either dead, imprisoned or participating in the Iraqi insurgency. The first iteration of AQY has been retrospectively described as "a network of foreign leaders abroad and local operatives at home who organized around discrete military plots rather than a permanent or institutionalized terrorist organization."

=== 2006: Revival ===
On 3 February 2006, a group of 23 incarcerated al-Qaeda members escaped from a Political Security Organization detention center in Sanaa after digging a tunnel to a nearby mosque. The escape was widely believed to be in some part facilitated by the Political Security, which had extensive ties to the mujahideen during the Soviet–Afghan War.

The escape coincided with the emergence of a "second generation" of al-Qaeda militants in Yemen. Many of the younger generation had fought in the Iraqi insurgency or directly under Osama bin Laden in Afghanistan before arriving to Yemen. Nasser al-Bahri, Bin Laden's former bodyguard, regarded them as "nihilists" who "relished warfare and destruction for its own sake" due to only experiencing combat in places such as Iraq. This generation has been referred to as "better organised and more ambitious," than their older counterparts. As opposed to the "first generation" which had commonly negotiated and compromised with authorities resulting in deals allowing them to remain free as long as they didn't carry out attacks within Yemen, the younger militants refused any dialogue with the Yemeni government, seeing it as illegitimate and aiming to overthrow it. Older militants sent by the government as negotiators were rejected as traitors. In addition to radicalization in other battlefields, the new generation's views were motivated by torture and humiliation they suffered under Yemeni authorities while serving lengthy prison terms, many of which were bestowed without formal charges.

The second generation of AQY coalesced under the leadership of escapees Nasir al-Wuhayshi as well as Qasim al-Raymi. Wuhayshi's time serving as Osama Bin Laden's secretary in Afghanistan and association with the first generation of militants earned him the respect of the what became the second generation. Utilizing Bin Laden's "centralization of decision making and decentralization of execution" policy, Wuahyshi structured his rendition of AQY by assigning emirs, or commanders, to different regions of Yemen, in order to allow the organization to withstand leadership losses which had previously destroyed it. He also sought to limit Muslim civilians casualties in the group's attacks, believing that it was a factor that lead to the demise of other al-Qaeda groups in Iraq and in Saudi Arabia. Utilizing their connections to al-Qaeda veterans such as USS Cole bomber and fellow escapee Jamal al-Badawi, and their experience in operating an al-Qaeda group, AQY's leadership would silently rebuild the group throughout the rest of the year.

The group's first attacks would take place on 15 September 2006 in a form of a double-suicide car bombing against two oil facilities in Marib and Hadhramaut Governorates. Though the attacks failed, killing only one guard and leaving four militants dead, it reflected the most sophisticated operation taken by AQY since 2002, and itself the first instance of VBIED usage on land in the country. Al-Rabeiee, who oversaw the training of the bombers, was killed in a military raid on 1 October 2006.

=== 2007–2008: Resurgence ===
On 1 May 2007, AQY stated to journalist Faisal Mukrim that it was behind the 29 March assassination of Ali Mahmud Qasaylah, chief criminal investigator in Marib, for his purported role in the killing of Abu Ali al-Harithi in 2002. On 21 June, AQY officially announced its reemergence in an audio message appointing Wuhayshi as the group's leader and urging older militants to reject negotiations with the government. From there on, the group's statements generally coincided with the launching of an attack which matches its rhetoric. On 27 June, another message from the group vowed revenge for the killing of its leaders and listed several demands to the government, which met none of them. On 2 July, an AQY suicide bomber rammed an explosive-laden car into a Spanish tourist convoy at the Queen of Sheba temple in Marib, killing eight tourists and two Yemeni drivers.

After the bombing, Nayf Muhammad al-Qahtani, participant in its planning, had a meeting with Wuhayshi in which he proposed the created of Sada al-Malahem, a flagship e-magazine for the group. Wuhayshi approved of its creation, with the first issue of the magazine being released on 12 January 2008, in which AQY vowed to free imprisoned militants and avenge those killed by Yemeni security forces. In the second issue of Sada al-Malahem released on 13 March, the group had begun referring to itself as al-Qaeda in the Southern Arabian Peninsula. According to The Jamestown Foundation, the second issue of the magazine, which contained a section denying the legitimacy of a January interview with the purported Information Officer of the group, provided a "certainty of tone and authority ... that was lacking in the first." The third issue, which was released on 15 May and carried a cover image of the USS Cole bombing, warned all non-Muslims from entering the Arabian Peninsula or else they would be targeted. The 9 July issue encouraged the kidnapping of Western tourists and lamented militants who had turned themselves in to authorities. Sada al-Malahem represented a significant growth in AQSAP's operational capacity.

On 17 September, AQSAP launched an assault on the US embassy in Sanaa. Although initially claimed by the then-unknown group Islamic Jihad in Yemen, AQSAP later took responsibility for the attack in the fifth issue of Sada al-Malahem, which was released on 14 November after having been delayed since July. The attack, which failed to breach the embassy but nonetheless killed 19 people, was described as the largest and most sophisticated attack conducted by AQSAP since the MV Limburg bombing. Analysts noted that the attack was a sign that AQSAP was attainting significant strength. In November, al-Qaeda deputy leader Ayman al-Zawahiri publicly recognized Wuhayshi as the leader of al-Qaeda in the region.

==== Soldiers' Brigades of Yemen ====
On 18 January, after no prisoners were freed by the government despite AQSAP's warning, a two-vehicle convoy of Belgian tourists was ambushed by gunmen in Wadi Dawan, who killed two tourists and two Yemeni drivers. On 24 February, the Wadi Dawan ambush, along with several other attacks including the 2007 Marib bombing and the assassination of Ali Mahmud Qasaylah, were claimed by a previously unknown group called al-Qaeda in the Arabian Peninsula: Soldiers' Brigades of Yemen (SBY), also called the Jund al-Yemen Brigades.

Led by 2006 prison escapee Hamza al-Quaiti, SBY would launch at least 13 attacks throughout 2007 and 2008 either directly claimed by the group in a statement or of a similar style to its tactics. The group launched a mortar attack on the US embassy on 18 March, less than a week after Sada al-Malahem's second issue was released featuring an interview which encouraged attacks on Western targets. Though the shells missed the embassy and instead hit a nearby girls school, killing a guard and injuring 13 students, SBY nonetheless claimed the attack as well a clash on 1 March with soldiers in Mukalla. A week later it claimed responsibility for bombing a French oil pipeline on 27 March and a mortar attack on a Chinese oil company on 29 March. The Yemeni government confirmed a pipeline explosion but denied it being a terrorist attack. After a pair of attacks on two military checkpoints in Hadhramaut, on 6 April, 30 April, and 30 May, SBY launched mortar attacks on a residential compound housing Americans in Sanaa, the Italian embassy in Sanaa, and an oil refinery in Aden respectively, each attack failing to cause significant damage or any injuries.

On 25 June, SBY claimed that it had fired three Katyusha rockets at the Safer oil refinery in Marib. Though the Yemeni government did not acknowledge any attack, local witnesses said that two unfired rockets were found in the area while one had been fired but missed its target. SBY later released a video showing the attack, though none of the rockets were seen being fired. On 25 July, a suicide bomber drove an explosive-laden Kia vehicle into a compound housing Yemeni security forces in Seiyun, Hadhramaut, killing one policeman and injuring 17 others. The group claimed responsibility for the attack on 27 July in a message which showed the perpetrator, identified as Ahmad bin Saeed bin Umar al-Mashraji, standing behind the group's flag with another masked individual.

Analyst Gregory D. Johnsen suggests that, rather than being two distinct groups, AQY and SBY were "loose cells of the same organization." He cites a video released by SBY in which the suicide bomber in the 2007 Marib attack appears to use the names AQY and SBY interchangeably, suggesting that the groups were "synonymous for the members of al-Qaeda in Yemen". He also referred to the fact that AQSAP published eulogies in its Sada al-Malahem magazine for several militants associated with attacks later claimed by SBY, such as Abd al-Aziz Said Jaradan, who participated in the assassination of Qasaylah, and Yasser al-Hamayqani, whose death in 2007 was listed as a motivation for the 2007 Marib bombing in SBY's claim. Analysts noted SBY's less sophisticated and poorer quality attacks than AQY, the Gulf Research Center claiming a “lack of battle and planning experience, technical skills, training, and the lack of resources.” SBY was also an extremely localized cell, suggesting a diffusion of strength between it and AQY.

On 11 August, a raid on a hideout in Tarim, Hadhramaut, lead to the capture of two SBY militants and the deaths of five, including group leader al-Quaiti. The group posted a statement vowing revenge for his death on 19 August, weeks before the attack on the US embassy. An individual known as Abu Osama was named later the leader of the group and vowed to launch more attacks. Despite this, SBY's operations would cease after the killing of Quaiti. Its remnants would be tried by a Yemeni court in 2009 as a group commonly referred to as the "Tarim cell."

=== 2009: Merger ===
On 20 January 2009, a statement was posted on an Islamist forum in which Nasir al-Wuhayshi announced the merger of AQSAP with members of the mostly inactive al-Qaeda group in Saudi Arabia to form a new organization, al-Qaeda in the Arabian Peninsula. Later on 24 January, the group released a video titled "We Start from Here and We Will Meet at al-Aqsa" which featured Wuhayshi and Qasim al-Raymi along with Saudi militants and former Guantanamo Bay detainees Muhammad al-Awfi and Said Ali al-Shihri. Shihri, who had travelled to Yemen "more than 10 months ago" and was implicated in the 2008 US embassy attack, was named deputy leader of the group.
