= September attacks =

September attacks may refer to:

- The September 11 attacks in New York and Washington on September 11, 2001
- The September 2006 Yemen attacks
- The fictional nuclear attacks in the television series Jericho, situated in September 2006
