= Fawaz al-Rabeiee =

Yemeni terrorist

- فواز الربيعي
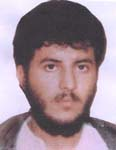
- Rabeiee in an undated photograph
- Born: Fawaz Yahya al-Rabeiee; 1979; Saudi Arabia
- Died: October 1, 2006 (aged 26–27); Sanaa, Yemen
- Military career
- Allegiance: Al-Qaeda (2000-2001): Al-Qaeda in Yemen (2002–2006)
- Service years: 2000–2006
- Rank: Al-Qaeda cell leader
- Conflicts: Al-Qaeda insurgency in Yemen

Fawaz Yahya al-Rabeiee (Note: Arabic: فواز يحيى الربيعي) (1979 – October 1, 2006) was a Yemeni Islamist militant who was a cell ringleader for al-Qaeda in Yemen (AQY). Rabeiee and his cell were responsible for several attacks and plots on behalf of AQY, most prominently the MV Limburg bombing.

Rabeiee was born in 1979 in Saudi Arabia to Yemeni parents. Him and his family was deported to Yemen by the Saudi government in 1990. In 2000, he travelled to Afghanistan and trained in al-Qaeda camp before returning to Yemen in late 2001. In February 2002, he was identified as the leader of an al-Qaeda cell preparing attacks against the United States. Throughout 2002, Rabeiee was responsible for planning and perpetrating several AQY attacks, including the bombing of a Civil Aviation Authority building in April, the MV Limburg bombing in October, and the attempted shootdown of a Hunt Oil helicopter in November.

Rabeiee was captured on 28 March 2003. Alongside his 14-man cell, he was convicted of several terrorist attacks by a Yemeni court and sentenced to 10 years in prison in August 2004. He was later sentenced to death by an appeal court in February 2005. On 3 February 2006, Rabeiee along with 22 other al-Qaeda-linked suspects escaped from a prison in Sanaa. After his escape, he was involved in planning two AQY suicide bombings in September 2006. Rabeiee was killed by Yemeni security forces on 1 October 2006.

== Early life ==
Rabeiee was born 1979 to Yemeni parents in Saudi Arabia. He was the third of four brothers and four sisters and attended al-Falah school in Jeddah. In 1990, he was among the near millions of Yemeni families expelled from Saudi Arabia due to Yemen's support for Saddam Hussein during the Iraqi invasion of Kuwait. During the late 1990s, Rabeiee took a job in the personnel department in the presidential office in Yemen.

== Militant activities (2000–2003) ==
=== Afghanistan ===
In early 2000, Rabeiee along with two other individuals, including a former member of the Political Security Organization (PSO), travelled to Afghanistan in order to "die as a martyr", claiming that the money he earned from his job within the Yemen was haram. Rabeiee spent the rest of the year and most of 2001 in Afghanistan, spending time with September 11 hijackers Muhammad Atta and Ziad Jarrah and allegedly training in an al-Qaeda camp with Abu Musab al-Zarqawi.

=== Al-Qaeda in Yemen ===
Rabeiee returned to Yemen in late 2001, becoming the ringleader of a 12-man AQY cell. On 11 February 2002, the FBI issued an alert warning of potential terrorist attacks against the United States or its oversea interests, claiming that Rabeiee was planning an attack alongside 16 other associates, some linked to Osama bin Laden. The FBI later dropped their search for six of the suspects after learning that they were already in Yemeni custody.

Rabeiee was involved in a bombing near Civil Aviation Authority offices in Sanaa on April 17 2002. He headed the AQY cell responsible for the MV Limburg bombing on 6 October 2002, which killed a Bulgarian sailor and injured 12 others. The attack was reportedly conducted on the orders of Abu Ali al-Harithi, the leader of AQY. Later in November, he and his brother Abu Bakr al-Rabeiee organized a cell for the attempted shootdown of a Hunt Oil helicopter, which injured two employees.

== Capture and trial ==
Rabeiee along with 10 other suspected militants were arrested by Yemeni authorities on 28 March 2003. The group was captured in Marib governorate after a helicopter chase.

The trial for the cell headed by Rabeiee, which was numbered at 15 people (one of whom was tried in absentia) began on 29 May 2004. The group was accused of involvement in several terrorist attacks and plots, including the MV Limburg bombing, the Hunt Oil helicopter attack, the Civil Aviation Authority bombing and a plot to assassinate the US ambassador to Yemen, Edmund Hull. The verdict for the trial was reached on 28 August, with Rabeiee along with his brother Abu Bakr being sentenced to 10 years in prison for their role in the Hunt Oil helicopter attack, and each being fined 18.3 million Yemeni riyals (US$99,457) for the Civil Aviation Authority bombing.

The appeal case for Rabeiee and the 14 other suspects was held in December of that year. During his final statement, Rabeiee confessed that he and other suspects were "very close" to Osama bin Laden and had pledged to him that they would kill Americans. He said that "I would never nullify a pledge I gave to the imam of mujahideen Sheikh Osama Bin Laden,” and “Sheikh Osama asked me if we wanted to cut down a tree, should we hit it in different points? I replied: No, we should concentrate our hits on one point till the tree falls down,” referencing the United States. On 5 February 2005, Rabeiee was sentenced to death after being found guilty in planning the MV Limburg bombing as well as the killing of a Yemeni security officer.

== Escape and aftermath ==
On 3 February 2006, Rabeiee along with 22 other al-Qaeda linked prisoners escaped from a PSO prison in Sanaa by digging a tunnel from their cell to a nearby mosque. During his time as a fugitive, he reportedly visited his father at a hospital with no disguise.

Rabeiee was involved in planning AQY's first attacks since 2002, a pair of simultaneous suicide bombings on 15 September 2006 targeting two oil facilities in Yemen. The attack was partially funded by four million Saudi riyals which were given to him by Bandar al-Awka, a militant arrested in Sanaa the day after the attacks who was part of a cell carrying weapons and explosives. Two of the men who escaped from prison earlier in the year alongside Rabeiee, Shafiq Ahmad Zayd and Umar Saeed Jarallah, served as suicide bombers in the two attacks.

== Death ==
On 1 October 2006, Rabeiee was alongside fellow al-Qaeda member and prison escapee Muhammad al-Daylami during a pre-dawn raid by Yemeni security forces in Sanaa. Based on a tip to Yemeni authorities, a house in a Sanaa suburb that Rabeiee was hiding in was raided, leading to a shootout which killed him and Daylami.
