= September 2006 Yemen attacks =

Suicide attacks on Yemeni oil facilities

- Part of the al-Qaeda insurgency in Yemen
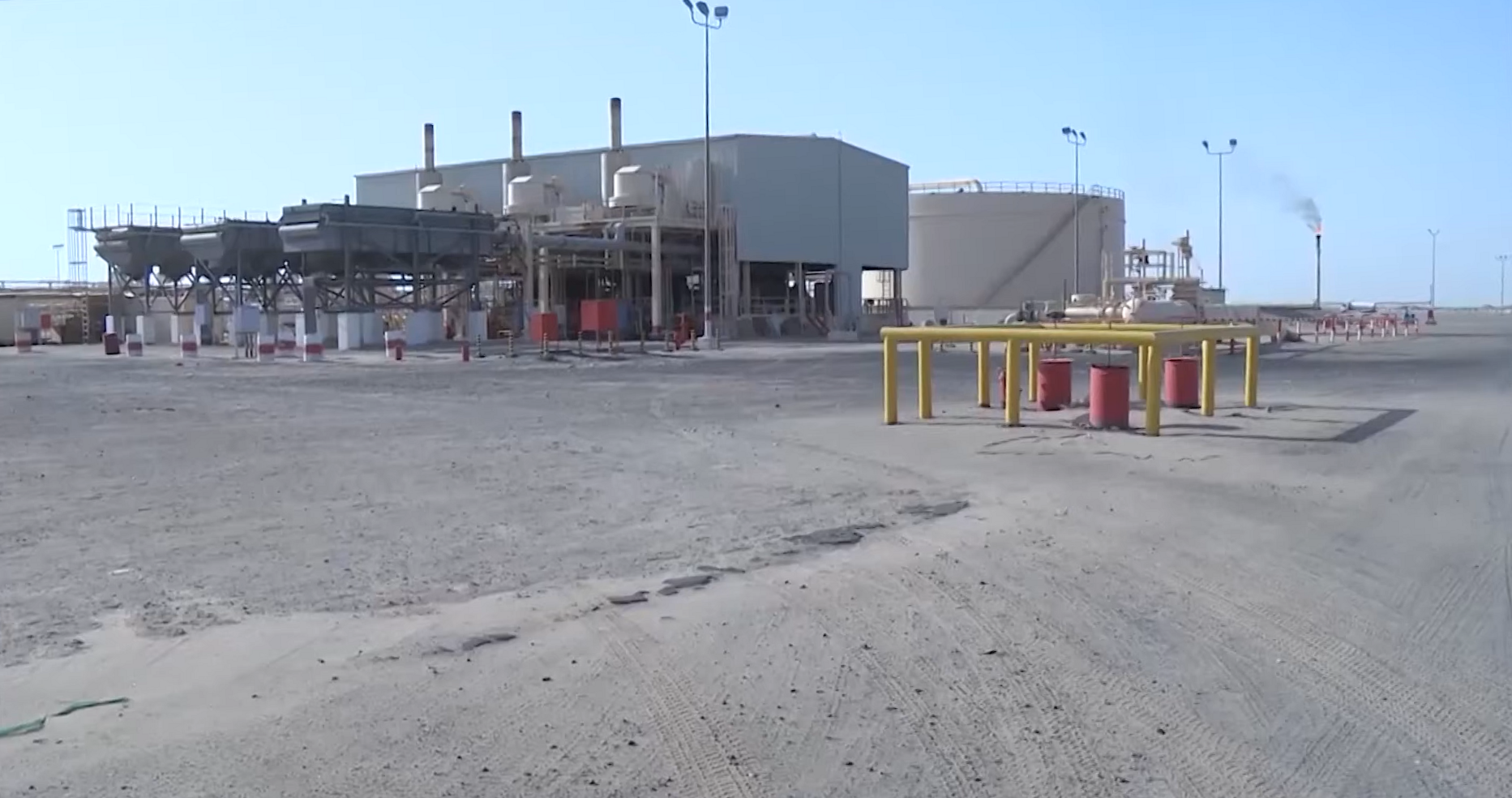
- The Safer Refinery in 2018

- Location of the attacks
- Location: Hadhramaut and Marib Governorate, Yemen
- Date: 15 September 2006; 5:15 a.m. – 5:50 a.m. (UTC+3)
- Target: Dhabba Oil Terminal; Safer Refinery
- Attack type: Car bombings; suicide bombings; gunfight
- Weapon: Truck bombs
- Deaths: 5 (including 4 perpetrators)
- Injuries: 2
- Perpetrator: Al-Qaeda in Yemen
- Assailants: Shafiq Ahmad Umar Zayd †; Hashim Khalid al-Iraqi †; Jarallah Umar †; Ahmad Muhammad al-Abiyad †
- Convicted: 32

On 15 September 2006, two suicide attacks occurred at separate oil facilities in Yemen. In the first incident, two attackers driving trucks bombs attempted to blow up storage tanks at the Dhabba Oil Terminal in Hadhramaut Governorate. They failed to reach their target and exploded prematurely, killing one security guard. Within an hour, two other attackers in explosive-laden vehicles tried to raid the Safer Refinery in Marib Governorate but were killed by security forces before doing so. Neither site suffered notable damage.

The attacks were claimed by al-Qaeda in Yemen, their first since a prison escape earlier in the year freed many of their members. Authorities arrested al-Qaeda operatives the next day who were planning to conduct a third simultaneous attack in Sanaa. Investigators linked the attacks to a video released days earlier by al-Qaeda deputy leader Ayman al-Zawahiri urging strikes against the oil industry in the region. Authorities convicted 32 militants of involvement in planning the attacks in 2007, bestowing sentences ranging from 2 to 15 years of imprisonment.

Having occurred five days before presidential elections in Yemen, the political opposition accused President Ali Abdullah Saleh and his regime of exploiting the attacks for political gain. The day before the election took place, Saleh announced in a press conference the arrest of Hussein al-Dharnani in connection to the attacks and accused opposing candidate Faisal bin Shamlan of employing him as a bodyguard. This was denied by Shamlan and his coalition which instead claimed Dharnani was a regime asset. Dharnani was tried and acquitted of involvement. The attacks are considered to have failed tactically and strategically, but marked an increase in complexity of al-Qaeda operations in Yemen.

== Background and planning ==
On 3 February 2006, a group of 23 incarcerated jihadists escaped from a prison in Sanaa. This marked the beginning of a resurgence for al-Qaeda in Yemen after years of declining activity. The escapees scattered and silently rebuilt al-Qaeda's network throughout the following months. Fawaz al-Rabeiee lobbied for launching an attack immediately, but leader Nasir al-Wuhayshi preferred to bide their time. Regardless, they began planning out an attack as tribal mediation for the surrender of the escapees stalled. By September only 14 of the 23 fugitives remained at large.

Inspired by an attack in Abqaiq, Saudi Arabia, earlier in 2006 claimed by the regional al-Qaeda affiliate, Rabeiee organized an attack on two oil facilities in Yemen alongside other escaped militants with the approval of Wuhayshi. Osama bin Laden had been calling for these types of attacks in the region for years. A video of his deputy, Ayman al-Zawahiri, was released on the anniversary of the September 11 attacks declaring the Arab states of the Persian Gulf were among their next targets, calling for attacks on oil facilities for stealing Muslim wealth.

The two attack were each carried out by a pair of militants—one escapee and one recruit. In both of them, the more experienced militant was to ram an explosive-laden vehicle into the entrance of the facility allowing for a second car bomb to drive through and hit the intended target. The vast majority of those involved in planning, recruiting and training the attackers were escapees including Rubaiee, Wuhayshi, Qasim al-Raymi, Hamza al-Quaiti and Muhammad al-Umda. Rabeiee reportedly received four million Saudi riyals from Bandar al-Akwa funneled to him by Said al-Akbar to partially fund the operation.

== Attacks ==
After reciting morning prayers on 15 September 2006, the attackers loaded explosives onto their vehicles and headed to their respective targets. Both attacks occurred within 35 minutes of each other and were reportedly timed to coincide with morning shift changes at each installation. Each vehicle was loaded with up to 10 gas canisters rigged with explosives.

The first attack targeted a joint oil storage facility owned by the Canadian company Nexen at the Dhabba Oil Terminal in Hadhramaut Governorate. The port is regarded as Yemen's primary export station in the Gulf of Aden. At 5:15 a.m. local time, two explosive-laden pickup trucks were spotted driving at high speeds in an attempt to blow up the oil storage tankers. They were driven by Shafiq Ahmad Umar Zayd, an escapee, and Hashim Khalid al-Iraqi. The first vehicle's driver was wearing a uniform resembling those used by the workers, while the second one wore a military uniform.

The bombers failed to reach their intended target. Some sources reported the bombers had failed to reach the site, while a local official told Al Jazeera that one driver breached the main gate and fired a weapon at security guards "as a second car tried to advance behind it", whereupon the guards returned fire and the vehicles exploded. The first vehicle exploded at the perimeter fence, while the second detonated "just inside the perimeter" after the driver was shot. No damage to the site was reported, although a small fire occurred in a storage tanker due to shrapnel and was quickly put out. A security guard employed by Nexen was killed after being struck by gunfire, while two others were wounded.

The second attack targeted the Safer Refinery in Marib operated by the American Hunt Oil Company. At 5:50 a.m., two white vehicles similar to those used by staff drove towards the refinery. One was driven by escapee Jarallah Umar while the other was driven by Ahmad Muhammad al-Abiyad. Security guards and Yemeni army troops stationed there intercepted the attackers. One vehicle detonated at the perimeter fence around 200 meters apart from the installation. The other vehicle drove 50 yards within the installation before security fired upon it 100 yards away from the pipelines according to officials. It detonated at an interior fence around 20 from the installation. Both attackers died and no one else was hurt, and the refinery was not damaged.

== Responsibility ==
Initially going unclaimed, a statement attributed to al-Qaeda in Yemen claiming responsibility for the attacks surfaced on 7 November 2006 through an Islamist website. Dated to the 20th of Ramadan (corresponding to 13 October), it said the attacks were done on the orders of Bin Laden to "hit the Western economy and stop the robbing of Muslims' wealth", and were successful despite media reports on the contrary. It vowed further attacks against the United States and its allies and demanded that Yemeni president Ali Abdullah Saleh implements Sharia and renounces democracy. It also mentioned revenge for the killings of al-Qaeda leaders Abu Musab al-Zarqawi from Iraq and Abu Ali al-Harithi from Yemen.

The online statement is believed to be the first of its kind published by al-Qaeda in Yemen. An anonymous US intelligence official told Reuters their analysts were verifying the authenticity of the statement, mentioning that "we think they've been trying to get this up on a website for awhile." Separately, an official said to Fox News they believed it was authentic, and that the timing of its release was unrelated to American midterm elections. 22 May reported the first response to the statement from a Yemeni government official, who called it "worrying" but maintained confidence in security forces to address further threats.

Just before the sentencing of a group of militants involved in the attacks in 2007, pro al-Qaeda websites shared a video of attacker Shafiq Ahmad Umar Zayd. In the video he gives a message addressed to Bin Laden and is also seen performing a "traditional Yemeni dance with the other suicide bombers before bidding each other farewell."

== Investigation ==
Explosives specialists were deployed at each site in the immediate aftermath of the attacks to search for unexploded ordnance. The Ministry of Interior announced the launch of an investigation. Officials did not want to prematurely assign responsibility, some suggesting possible links with the kidnapping of four French nationals earlier in September. President Saleh announced a $25,500 reward for information leading to the capture or killing of those involved in the attacks.

Four suspected al-Qaeda operatives were arrested at a house in Sanaa on 16 September after a standoff with security forces. Authorities seized 12 bags of explosives, masks, women's clothing, forged documents, a vehicle license plate, and a video camera among other items. Interior minister Rashad al-Alimi said the four had admitted to their association with al-Qaeda after being interrogated and were likely linked to the previous attacks. He also said the attacks were linked to the video released by Zawahiri, acknowledging the presence of al-Qaeda sleeper cells in Yemen. Prime minister Abdul Qadir Bajamal told Saba News Agency that "investigators have uncovered all the details related to the two operations and the identity of the perpetrators." Investigators believed the perpetrators utilized satellite imagery from Google Earth in planning the attacks, which may have helped them inflict slight damage at the Dhabba Oil Terminal.

During a press conference at the Presidential Palace on 19 September, Saleh announced the arrest of Hussein al-Dharnani while also labeling him a bodyguard of rival presidential candidate Faisal bin Shamlan. Saleh accused him of association with the cell arrested in Sanaa and involvement in the Hadhramaut and Marib attacks and the foiled Sanaa plots. State media claimed he owned the house which the cell was arrested in. The state-ran 26 September reported that he utilized multiple names, passports, and identification cards, was a militant in Afghanistan, and was associated with Bin Laden.

The news website of the ruling General People's Congress reported on 20 September that over a three-day period, several people were linked to the attacks during the investigation including Dharnani, whose house was searched and neighbours were questioned. Investigators found the Sanaa cell had links to Rabeiee. The Ministry of Interior stated authorities had learned the identities of the attackers and that the Sanaa cell was preparing to carry out another suicide attack alongside those in Hadhramaut and Marib. Rabeiee was killed alongside fellow militant and prison escapee Muhammad al-Daylami during a gunfight with authorities in Sanaa on 1 October, which also led to the arrest of three associates.

== Trial ==
On 4 March 2007, a Yemeni court charged 36 suspected al-Qaeda members, six of then in absentia, with providing logistical support for the attacks along with plotting several other operations against oil infrastructure and business targets in Yemen. They were also accused of housing 10 of the 23 fugitive al-Qaeda members. All the suspects present at the court pleaded not guilty. Six claimed they had been tortured into giving forced confessions.

Prosecutor Khalid al-Mawri accused the suspects of having received training in the Marib desert by Wuhayshi, Raymi, and Rabeiee. He claimed the latter incited them to attack American and Yemeni targets. Abu Bakr al-Rabeiee, the brother of Fawaz, renounced his confession that he and others were planning attacks on US interests in Yemen, instead claiming the admission was extracted through torture and that he had been approached by jihadist groups to participate in attacks in Yemen and Iraq but refused to do so.

By the time a hearing on 6 August was held, the number of individuals charged in the case had dropped to 33 as three of those in absentia had been killed. The prosecution demanded the maximum penalty of 10 to 15 years for each suspect, while the defense said there was no concrete evidence implicating the suspects except for statements made during interrogations they claimed were extracted under duress. The court announced their verdict would be issued on 7 November.

The court convicted 32 individuals and sentenced them to prison terms ranging from 2 to 15 years. Wuhayshi and Raymi were among those who received the highest punishment because they planned the attacks, while the court issued sentences of 12 years for Quaiti and 10 years for Umda and Jaber Elbanah, all of whom were still at large. The rest of the suspects received sentences ranging from two to eight years for smaller roles in the plots. Four people, including Dharnani, were acquitted based off a lack of evidence.

The prosecution was not satisfied with the bestowed punishment and sought an appeal, which began on 23 February 2008. During the first hearing, Elbanah arrived in court midway through the session and delivered a speech in which he proclaimed his innocence and said he personally agreed to a deal with President Saleh to avoid jail time before leaving. He had surrendered to authorities in May 2007 and was reportedly under loose house arrest after being sentenced, but a judge later ordered his imprisonment on 18 May. The court reached its conclusion on 8 November, reducing Elbanah's sentence to five years along with Emad Shas, while sentencing the previously acquitted Jamil al-Haimi to three years. The sentences of 31 others individuals were upheld.

== Aftermath ==
The targeted oil facilities resumed standard operations by the next day. Kevin Finn, vice president of operations for Nexen, said the attacks would not affect their presence in Yemen "other than to make us ever more vigilant." The US embassy in Sanaa issued a statement advising Americans residing in Yemen to exercise caution and suspended travel for non-essential officials.

Speaking at an election rally, Saleh said the attacks were "targeting security, stability and development in this country" and would have caused an economic crisis had they succeeded. Later at the press conference he said they were not executed directly by the escaped fugitives but youth who they "mislead and deceive... to carry out for them such sabotage acts". Sultan bin Abdulaziz, the crown prince of Saudi Arabia, condemned the attacks in a phone call with him. The interior ministry stated it would continue its efforts to combat terrorism.

=== Impact on presidential election ===
Ali Abdullah Saleh was accused of using the attacks to influence the upcoming presidential election.

The attacks occurred five days prior to presidential elections in Yemen, considered the first to feature genuine opposition against Saleh despite him still being expected to win. Political analyst Jane Novak considered their handling an example of the Saleh regime "exploiting the terror issue for political gain" through linking Bin Shamlan's rhetoric about the oil industry with them and later publicly accusing Dharnani of involvement a day before the election took place.

The accusations brought against Dharnani at Saleh's press conference, in which he raised a photograph of Dharnani behind Bin Shamlan at a rally, were rejected by Bin Shamlan and his coalition, the Joint Meeting Parties (JMP). Muhammad Qahtan, executive board chairman of the JMP, said Dharnani was among many people who volunteered to accompany Bin Shamlan during the election campaign in a widespread recruiting drive. He was then dismissed eight days later—prior to the attacks—after his neighbours informed the JMP that he was an intelligence asset according to Qahtan. Opposition figures noted that Dharnani was married to a cousin of Saleh, while Bin Shamlan held a press conference pointing out a state television broadcast of the Sanaa cell being arrested which featured Dharnani being interviewed as a witness. The Ministry of Interior denied claims of Dharnani having government links and mentioned the JMP previously rejected an offer for state-provided security.

The opposition believed Saleh's press conference was timed to discredit Bin Shamlan and influence the election. Qahtan said the investigation "should not be mixed up with the political process or an election campaign", while Bin Shamlan's campaign manager, Zaid al-Shami, called it a scare tactic. Some in the opposition, such as Nasserist Unionist People's Organisation leader Sultan al-Atwani, accused the government of staging the attacks to blame them on the opposition. Islah secretary-general Abdul Wahab al-Ansi did not corroborate these claims specifically but said: "the way the government has exploited these acts casts doubt on their veracity, especially given that GPC accused the opposition of backing the operation."

Yemen Times columnist Mohammed Al-Qadhi said the attacks were "surely going to affect the fever of [the] elections", voicing concern that it would inflame tensions between the ruling party and the opposition which could possibly spill into violence. Saleh said the attacks were deliberately timed to disrupt the democratic process and urged peace among voters and political forces on election day. Security procedures were heightened in response to the attacks, with over 100,000 security forces deployed to guard voting sites and another 100,000 personnel on standby to combat threats. Saleh comfortably won the election as predicted with 77.17% of the vote while Bin Shamlan received 21.82%, a record share for the opposition.

=== Dharnani interview ===
Mareb Press and Al-Nas published an interview with Dharnani in 2009. He described himself as a prominent businessman from Dhale Governorate as well as an American citizen. He served as an escort for Bin Shamlan rather than a bodyguard, having been offered the role by an acquaintance in the JMP as a prominent representative of Dhale. Dharnani accompanied Bin Shamlan for a few rallies until they had a disagreement whereupon he left the campaign.

Dharnani claims that during this time, an al-Qaeda cell snuck into and occupied the house of one of his wives unbeknownst to her through a relative who was linked to al-Qaeda and the government. By the time he returned from the campaign, he found the house surrounded by authorities and attempted to mediate with the militants inside before they surrendered. He informed investigators of explosives in the house and was filmed by them for a televised interview. Days later, he was summoned by Saleh who placed him in protective custody based on alleged threats from al-Qaeda in response to the interview. The police held him before transferring him to the Political Security Organization, which held him in solitary confinement and later a group cell where he first learned that Saleh labeled him a terrorist. Dharnani voiced displeasure with the JMP for not defending him and claiming he was a government agent. After being acquitted, he said he received sympathy from officials but not an official apology which he demanded in the interview.

== Analysis ==
For Perspectives on Terrorism, Tim Pippard said the attacks were "over-ambitious..., poorly conceived and executed worse". He questions the selection of the two targeted facilities as he claims neither were particularly significant to the petroleum industry of Yemen, rendering the impact of the attacks marginal even if they succeeded. Similarities are noted with the Abqaiq attack, but he states: "the absence of a lead vehicle designed to clear a path for suicide vehicle-borne explosive devices (SVBIEDs) to breach the outer perimeters ultimately confounded the operations to failure." He also regarded them as a strategic failure as they did not demonstrate a coordinated al-Qaeda presence in the country, instead resembling an imitation of attacks in other jihadist theatres.

A US official said the attacks proved al-Qaeda had some level of organized presence in Yemen, one claiming it had "fully regrouped" since the prison escape. The Overseas Security Advisory Council noted that car bombs were a novel jihadist tactic in Yemen at that point. A report by the Combating Terrorism Center on the history of the al-Qaeda insurgency in Yemen noted the tactical complexity and ambition of the attacks in relation to attacks previous jihadist groups in Yemen. The usage of two car bombs each with distinct tactical objectives was cited as "a precursor to the multiphased US embassy attack in September 2008".

== See also ==
- MV Limburg bombing
