= Maritime Jewel =

Oil tanker attacked by Al Qaeda in 2002

History
- Name: Limburg (2000–2003); Maritime Jewel (2003–2018)
- Owner: Tanker Pacific Management (2003)
- Port of registry: Luxembourg; France
- Builder: Daewoo Shipbuilding
- Yard number: 5125
- Laid down: 24 May 1999
- Launched: 28 August 1999
- Completed: 5 January 2000
- In service: 2000
- Out of service: 2018
- Identification: IMO number: 9184392
- Fate: Broken up at Chittagong on 15 May 2018

General characteristics
- Class & type: Crude oil tanker
- Tonnage: 299,364 DWT; 157,833 GT; 108,708 NT
- Length: 332.0 m (1,089.2 ft) oa; 320.3 m (1,050.9 ft) pp
- Beam: 58.0 m (190.3 ft)
- Installed power: Diesel engine, 1 shaft
- Speed: 15 knots (28 km/h; 17 mph)

Maritime Jewel was a double-hulled oil tanker launched in 1999 and completed in 2000. Entering service that year, the ship was known as MV Limburg until 2003. The 332-metre (1,089 ft) ship carried crude oil between ports in Iran and Malaysia. On 6 October 2002, Limburg was attacked by suicide bombers, causing roughly 90,000 barrels (14,000 m^{3}) to leak into the Gulf of Aden. One crew member was killed and twelve more wounded in the attack. Four days after the attack, the tanker was towed to Dubai where she was repaired and renamed Maritime Jewel. Maritime Jewel was broken up for scrap at Chittagong, Bangladesh on 15 May 2018.

== Description ==
Ordered as Limburg the vessel was 332.0 m (1,089.2 ft) long overall and 320.3 m (1,050.9 ft) between perpendiculars with a beam of 58.0 m (190.3 ft). The ship's gross tonnage (GT) was 157,833 tons, with a deadweight tonnage (DWT) of 299,364 tons and a net tonnage (NT) of 108,708 tons. The ship was powered by a diesel engine driving one shaft giving the vessel a maximum speed of 15 knots (28 km/h; 17 mph).

== History ==
Limburg's keel was laid down on 24 May 1999 and the ship was launched on 28 August 1999. Limburg was completed on 5 January 2000 and entered service that year.

=== Bombing ===
On 6 October 2002, Limburg was carrying 397,000 barrels (63,100 m^{3}) of crude oil from Saudi Arabia to Malaysia, and was in the Gulf of Aden off Yemen to pick up another load of oil. She was registered under a French flag and had been chartered by the Malaysian petrol firm Petronas. While she was 3 km off the port of Al-Shihr, suicide bombers rammed an explosives-laden dinghy into the starboard side of the tanker. Upon detonation the vessel caught fire and approximately 90,000 barrels (14,000 m^{3}) of oil leaked into the Gulf of Aden. Although Yemeni officials initially claimed that the explosion was caused by an accident, later investigations found traces of TNT on the damaged ship.

One crew member was killed, and twelve other crew members were injured. The fire was extinguished, and four days later Limburg was towed to Dubai, United Arab Emirates. The ship was renamed Maritime Jewel, bought by Tanker Pacific, and repaired at Dubai Drydocks from March to August 2003. The attack caused the short-term collapse of international shipping in the Gulf of Aden and as a result, cost Yemen $3.8 million a month in port revenues.

==== Responsibility ====
Al Qaeda claimed responsibility for the attack on the Jehad.net website, which has since been shut down. Abd al-Rahim al-Nashiri, who allegedly also masterminded the USS Cole bombing, was charged by US military prosecutors for planning the attack. Osama bin Laden issued a statement, which read:

By exploding the oil tanker in Yemen, the holy warriors hit the umbilical cord and lifeline of the crusader community, reminding the enemy of the heavy cost of blood and the gravity of losses they will pay as a price for their continued aggression on our community and looting of our wealth.

On 3 February 2006, Fawaz Yahya al-Rabeiee, who had been sentenced to death for the Limburg attack, and 22 other suspected or convicted Al-Qaeda members escaped from jail in Yemen. Among them was Jamal al-Badawi, who masterminded the USS Cole bombing of 12 October 2000. Of the 23 escapees, 13 had been convicted of the Cole and Limburg bombings. On 1 October 2006, al-Rabeiee and Mohammed Daylami were shot and killed by Yemeni security forces during raids on two buildings in the capital Sanaa. One of al-Rabeiee's accomplices was also arrested during the raids. In February 2014 Ahmed al-Darbi pleaded guilty before the Guantanamo military commission to helping plan several maritime terrorist attacks including the Limburg attack. By the time of the attack, al-Darbi was already detained at Guantanamo.

=== Fate ===
Maritime Jewel was broken up for scrap at Chittagong, Bangladesh on 1 May 2018.
