= Mohammed Hamdi al-Ahdal =

Citizen of Saudi Arabia (born 1971)

Mohammed al-Ahdal
- محمد الأهدل

2st Leader of al-Qaeda in Yemen
- In office 2002 – 25 November 2003
- Preceded by: Abu Ali al-Harithi
- Succeeded by: Nasir al-Wuhayshi

1st Deputy Leader of al-Qaeda in Yemen
- In office 2000 – 3 November 2002
- Preceded by: Position established
- Succeeded by: Unknown

Personal details
- Born: Mohammed Hamdi al-Ahdal; 1971 (age 54–55) Medina, Saudi Arabia

Military service
- Allegiance: Al-Qaeda (1990s–2002); Al-Qaeda in Yemen (2000–2002)
- Years of service: 1980s–2002
- Rank: Leader of al-Qaeda in Yemen
- Battles/wars: Soviet–Afghan War; Bosnian War; First Chechen War; Al-Qaeda insurgency in Yemen

Mohammed Hamdi al-Ahdal (Note: Arabic: محمد حمدي الأهدل) (born 1971), also known by his nom de guerre Abu Issam al-Makki, (Note: Arabic: أبو علي الحارثي) is a Saudi Arabian-born Yemeni and former Islamist militant who was the second leader of al-Qaeda in Yemen (AQY) from 2002 until his arrest in 2003.

A veteran of the wars in Afghanistan, Bosnia and Chechnya, al-Adhal moved to Yemen in 2000 after being deported from Saudi Arabia due to his connections with Osama bin Laden. Joining AQY in the same year, al-Ahdal was described as the second highest-ranking member of the group, with connections to financing the USS Cole bombing in October 2000 and MV Limburg bombing in October 2002.

Al-Ahdal assumed leadership of AQY after the death of Abu Ali al-Harithi in November 2002. He was arrested by Yemeni authorities on 15 November 2003, and was sentenced to prison for three years in 2006. He was released later that December.

== Early life and militant activity ==
Al-Ahdal was born in 1971 in Medina, Saudi Arabia to Yemeni parents. During the 1980s, he attained significant experience fighting in the Soviet–Afghan War alongside the mujahideen. Analyst Steven Emerson described al-Ahdal as one of the first Afghan Arabs. He participated in the Bosnian War by travelling through the intermediary of a Saudi charity group called Berr and Ihsan. He also fought in the First Chechen War, during which his left leg was severed below the knee, requiring him to be fitted with an artificial limb. In 1999, al-Ahdal was arrested and detained in Saudi Arabia for 14 months due to maintaining connections with Osama bin Laden. He was deported to Yemen in 2000.

== Al-Qaeda in Yemen ==
=== Deputy leader ===
After being deported from Saudi Arabia, al-Ahdal joined AQY some time in 2000 after becoming acquainted with group leader Abu Ali al-Harithi. Al-Ahdal was described by a US official as the main coordinator of al-Qaeda activities in Yemen and second highest-ranking member of AQY. His roles in the group included managing finances, weapons smuggling and operational planning, and was well-connected to other al-Qaeda members and extremists in the Persian Gulf countries. Despite this, the official stated that he was not among the network's strategic planners or inner circle of leaders. The US government listed him as one of the top 20 al-Qaeda figures at large.

Upon his arrest, al-Ahdal was linked to the bombing of the USS Cole in October 2000, with CTC Westpoint describing his role as providing "logistical support" for the operation. Along with Harithi, al-Ahdal went into hiding during 2001 after being tipped off that they were wanted for questioning for their role in the bombing. Between August and November 2001, the two hid in Hosun al-Jalal, a village in the rural areas of Marib Governorate. In December 2001, the two were targeted in a raid by Yemeni security forces, though they both escaped as local tribesmen clashed with the soldiers.

During his time in Hosun al-Jalal, al-Ahdal developed a relationship with Qasim al-Raymi and Ibrahim Huweidi, both of whom participated in an AQY cell responsible for the MV Limburg bombing in October 2002. Yemeni government reports state that al-Ahdal had spent over $500,000 for AQY to buy weapons and explosives during 2002.

=== Leader ===
After a US drone strike killed Harithi in November 2002, the leadership of AQY had passed onto al-Ahdal. Al-Ahdal was described as a "general without an army" while serving as AQY's leader due to the group being severely weakened by that point.

== Arrest, trial and release ==
Al-Ahdal was arrested through a sting operation in Sanaa on 25 November 2003. According to a Yemeni official, security forces received information three weeks prior to the arrest that al-Ahdal was in the capital. The Yemeni government then "started tracing him until we slowly surrounded him by planting intelligence agents in neighbouring houses," according to the official. Al-Ahdal surrendered to authorities after they surrounded the house he was hiding in.

While under interrogation in December 2003, al-Ahdal admitted that he had a role in planning the USS Cole bombing and the MV Limburg bombing. According to a Yemeni official, he also provided information to investigators which implicated unnamed Saudis and Yemenis with financially supporting the several AQY attacks, including the two aforementioned bombings.

Al-Ahdal's trial began on 13 February 2006, with the prosecution accusing him of belonging to al-Qaeda and financing al-Qaeda attacks. He was also charged with the killings of 19 police officers from 2000 until his capture. Prosecutors claimed that al-Ahdal had received up to $50,000 from Osama bin Laden to finance AQY's operations to aid the families of detained AQY members. Al-Ahdal's participation in the USS Cole bombing was not mentioned during the trial. The prosecution asked for al-Ahdal to receive the death penalty. Charged alongside al-Ahdal was Ghalib al-Zaidi, a tribesman accused of sheltering al-Ahdal in Hosun al-Jalal during 2001.

On 3 May 2006, al-Ahdal was sentenced to three years and one month in prison. The court had found al-Ahdal guilty of participating in an attempted shootdown of a Hunt Oil helicopter in November 2002. However, he was acquitted of charges relating to his membership in AQY and financing the group's attacks, including the MV Limburg bombing. Al-Zaidi was acquitted of his charges and released, with the judge considering the time he had spent arrested as ample punishment. Al-Ahdal immediately appealed the case, though the sentence was upheld by the appeal court in a decision on 18 November 2006. The court added that al-Ahdal was eligible to be released on 7 January 2007 as it considered the time he had spent since his arrest in November 2003.

== See also ==
- Abu Ali al-Harithi
- Nasir al-Wuhayshi
