= Ahmed al-Darbi =

Saudi Arabian extrajudicial prisoner of the United States

- Born: Ahmed Mohammed Ahmed Haza al-Darbi; January 9, 1975 (age 51); Taif, Saudi Arabia
- Released: 2 May 2018
- Detained at: Guantanamo
- Other name: Abdul Aziz al-Janoubi
- ISN: 768
- Charge(s): Five war crimes, including terrorism, attacking civilians and hazarding a vessel
- Status: Pleaded guilty

Ahmed Mohammed Ahmed Haza al-Darbi (Arabic: أحمد محمد أحمد هزاع الدربي) is a citizen of Saudi Arabia who was held in extrajudicial detention in the United States Guantanamo Bay detainment camps, in Cuba from August 2002 to May 2018; in May 2018, he was transferred to Saudi Arabia's custody. He was the only detainee held at Guantanamo released during President Donald Trump's administration.

Al-Darbi was born on January 9, 1975, in Taif, Saudi Arabia. He was arrested in Azerbaijan in June 2002, renditioned by United States forces to Afghanistan, where he was held at Bagram Air Force Base, and then transferred to Guantanamo in August that year.

In February 2014, al-Darbi pleaded guilty to terrorism charges before a military commission in relation to the October 2002 attack on the Limburg, a French oil tanker off Yemen. By the time of the attack, al-Darbi was already detained at Guantanamo but was later charged with being a principal in planning the attack. He is the sixth detainee to plead guilty to charges, in part to establish a sentence and date for leaving Guantanamo.

== Background ==
The brother-in-law of Khalid al-Mihdhar, who participated in the September 11, 2001 attacks in the United States, specifically that on the Pentagon, al-Darbi was captured in Azerbaijan and arrested in June 2002.

He was renditioned by United States forces into Afghanistan. There he was held in the Bagram Collection Point, while it was still under control of Alpha Company of the 519th Military Intelligence Battalion. They were reported to have beat their captives, allegedly resulting in the deaths of two prisoners on December 4, 2001, and December 10, 2001. Al-Darbi later identified Damien M. Corsetti, a soldier nicknamed "the King of Torture" by his fellow GIs, as one of his abusers. In May 2006, Department of Defense spokesmen said that al-Darbi would not be allowed to testify at Corsetti's court martial for the deaths of detainees under his control.

Al-Darbi was transported from Bagram to the detention center at Guantanamo Navy Base in August 2002. On December 21, 2007, charges against Ahmed Mohammed Ahmed Haza al-Darbi were referred to the convening authority for the Office of Military Commissions.

== Military Commission charges ==
On December 21, 2007, charges against Ahmed Mohammed Ahmed Haza al-Darbi were referred to Susan Crawford, head of the Guantanamo military commissions, who approved them to continue to trial. He was charged, among other things, with the 2002 attack on the French oil tanker MV Limburg. Charges included the following:

Conspiring with others, to attack civilians, to murder in violation of the law of war, to destroy property in violation of the law of war, to hazard a vessel and to commit terrorism, and Providing Material Support to Terrorism.

He was alleged to have:

- trained at the Jihad Wahl training camp;
- transferred funds to finance the plot to attack shipping;
- purchased a vessel, registered in Sao Tome, to use in the attacks.

In April 2008, al-Darbi announced that he refused to participate in the Military Commission, as he believed it lacked legitimacy. He dismissed his military defense lawyer Brian Broyles, who described the refusal a "reasoned decision".

According to the Associated Press, at a hearing in December 2008, al-Darbi had "held up a photo of President Barack Obama as a sign of hope." According to the Associated Press, al-Darbi wrote to his lawyer that Obama could: "earn back the legitimacy the United States has lost in the eyes of the world."

Carol Rosenberg, writing in the Miami Herald, reported that Commission President James Pohl scheduled a hearing for May 27, 2009, to rule on how much of the evidence against al-Darbi was coerced through torture.

At a hearing on September 23, 2009, the Presiding Officer of the military commission to hear al-Darbi's case agreed to a 60-day delay. His lawyer Ramzi Kassem told reporters after the hearing that al-Darbi had written a brief note, addressed to President Obama, that he had hoped to read aloud at the hearing. Kassem read the note aloud to reporters. The Associated Press quoted passages from the note.

On February 5, 2014, Carol Rosenberg, writing in the Miami Herald, reported that the Pentagon had decided to "go forward" with new charges against al-Darbi, prosecuting him for the bombing of a French oil tanker in 2002. The Associated Press reported that the new charges had first been proposed in 2012.

On July 30, 2015, Spencer Ackerman, reporting in The Guardian, described efforts by al-Darbi's prosecution team to acquire incriminating evidence. They tried to persuade another detainee, Mohamedou Ould Slahi, to agree to be interrogated about al-Darbi. In 2009, US District Court Judge James Robertson had issued a special ruling, that Mohamedou Ould Slahi could no longer be interrogated. Slahi had been subjected to months of well-documented torture. While held at Guantanamo, from 2005 to 2006, Slahi wrote a memoir. After ten years of legal struggle, Slahi's lawyers succeeded in getting the manuscript declassified after numerous redactions. Published in January 2015 as Guantanamo Diary, his memoir became an international bestseller. He described suffering torture, including at Guantanamo.

After the publication of his memoir, camp authorities tried to cut off Slahi's contact with his lawyers. In April 2015, his lawyers learned that Slahi had written to them months earlier to describe how camp authorities in October 2014 had seized all his personal belongings, including a non-networked computer, and all his privileged legal case documents. They also took his comfort items, such as soap, razors, toothbrush, toothpaste, and shampoo. Slahi told his lawyers that he was later visited by al-Darbi's prosecution team, who promised him that if he voluntarily agreed to allow them to interrogate him about al-Darbi, they would arrange to have his belongings gradually returned to him.

== Official status reviews ==
Originally the Bush Presidency asserted that captives apprehended in the war on terror were not covered by the Geneva Conventions, and could be held indefinitely, without charge, and without an open and transparent review of the justifications for their detention. In 2004, the United States Supreme Court ruled, in Rasul v. Bush, that Guantanamo captives were entitled to habeas corpus, that is, being informed of the allegations justifying their detention, and were entitled to try to refute them.

=== Office for the Administrative Review of Detained Enemy Combatants ===
Combatant Status Review Tribunals were held in a 3x5 meter trailer where the captive sat with his hands and feet shackled to a bolt in the floor.

Following the Supreme Court's ruling the Department of Defense set up the Office for the Administrative Review of Detained Enemy Combatants.

Scholars at the Brookings Institution, led by Benjamin Wittes, listed the captives still held in Guantanamo in December 2008, according to whether their detention was justified by certain common allegations:

Ahmed Mohammed Ahmed Haza al-Darbi was listed as one of the captives who had faced charges before a military commission. He was among those whom "The military alleges ... are associated with both al-Qaeda and the Taliban." He was alleged to have taken military or terrorist training in Afghanistan, and was said to be an "al-Qaeda operative". He was among "82 detainees [who] made no statement to CSRT or ARB tribunals or made statements that do not bear materially on the military’s allegations against them."

=== Guantanamo assessment ===
On April 25, 2011, whistleblower organization WikiLeaks published formerly secret assessments drafted by Joint Task Force Guantanamo analysts. Al-Darbi's assessment was drafted on October 1, 2004. It was eight pages long, and was signed by camp commandant Brigadier General Jay W. Hood. He recommended continued detention.

=== 2009 Joint Review Task Force ===
When he assumed office in January 2009, President Barack Obama convened a six-agency task force to review the status of detainees at Guantanamo. It was part of his unsuccessful effort to move the proceedings and close the facility by early 2010. In its report a year later, the task force characterized most detainees as low-level fighters and recommended 53 be repatriated quickly. Obama promised that the use of torture would cease at the camp. He promised to institute a new review system. That new review system was composed of officials from six departments, where the OARDEC reviews were conducted entirely by the Department of Defense. When it reported back, a year later, the Joint Review Task Force classified some individuals as too dangerous to be transferred from Guantanamo, even though there was insufficient evidence to charge them with crimes. On April 9, 2013, that document was made public after a Freedom of Information Act request. Ahmed al-Darbi was classified as of April 19, 2013, as among 71 individuals considered too dangerous to release but with insufficient evidence for charges. Obama promised that such detainees would start to receive reviews from a Periodic Review Board, though al-Darbi eventually pleaded guilty.

== Charges before Military Commission ==
Al-Darbi was charged in 2014 by a military commission, accused of helping plan the October 6, 2002, attack on the French oil tanker Limburg near the port of Mukalla, Yemen. He pleaded guilty in February 2014 to the charges in the expectation of receiving a firm sentence and ultimately being released from Guantanamo, rather than continuing to be held in indefinite detention as he had been for the previous 12 years. At age 39, he was the sixth detainee to plead guilty. Observers expected that he would have to serve at least three and a half more years at Guantánamo before being sentenced, to what is expected to be 9 to 15 years, and then he is likely to be transferred to Saudi Arabia to serve the remainder of that term.

Al-Darbi admitted to having "bought boats, Global Positioning System devices and a hydraulic crane in the United Arab Emirates for use in the operation" and handling money "earmarked for it by al-Qaeda." He admitted intending for civilians to be killed; one Bulgarian crew died and 12 sailors were injured.

As part of his plea deal, al-Darbi agreed to testify for prosecutors against a higher-profile Saudi Arabian citizen, Abd al Rahim al Nashiri, who is facing the death penalty for war crimes. Nashiri is accused of having helped "plan several maritime terrorist attacks," including the 2000 bombing of the United States destroyer Cole near Aden, and the attack by suicide bombers on the Limburg in October 2002.
