= Qaed Salim Sinan al-Harethi =

Yemeni al-Qaeda leader (1955–2002)

Abu Ali al-Harithi
- أبو علي الحارثي
- Harithi in an undated photograph

1st Leader of al-Qaeda in Yemen
- In office Before 2000 – 3 November 2002
- Preceded by: Position established
- Succeeded by: Mohammed al-Ahdal

Personal details
- Born: Qaed Salim Sinan al-Harithi; 1955 Usaylan or Bahyan, Shabwa Governorate, Yemen
- Died: 3 November 2002 (aged 47) Marib, Marib Governorate, Yemen

Military service
- Allegiance: Islamic Jihad in Yemen (1990–1994) Al-Qaeda (1990–2002) Al-Qaeda in Yemen (before 2000–2002)
- Years of service: 1980s–2002
- Rank: Leader of al-Qaeda in Yemen
- Battles/wars: Soviet–Afghan War; Yemeni civil war (1994); Al-Qaeda insurgency in Yemen

Qaed Salim Sinan al-Harithi (Note: Arabic: قايد بن سالم بن سنان الحارثي; also transliterated as Harethi) (1955 – 3 November 2002), also known by his nom de guerre Abu Ali al-Harithi, (Note: Arabic: أبو علي الحارثي) was a Yemeni Islamist militant who served as the leader of al-Qaeda in Yemen (AQY) from some time before 2000 until his death in 2002.

Harithi developed a relationship with Osama bin Laden while fighting alongside him in the Soviet–Afghan War. He was sent to Yemen by Bin Laden in the late 1990s to assist in planning al-Qaeda attacks. Harithi was regarded as the highest-ranking leader among al-Qaeda operatives in Yemen by late 2001. He was implicated in several al-Qaeda attacks in Yemen, including the USS Cole bombing in October 2000 and the MV Limburg bombing in October 2002. Harithi was killed in a drone strike conducted by the United States on 3 November 2002.

== Early life and militancy ==
Harithi was born in 1955 in Shabwah Governorate, Yemen. A member of the Banu al-Harith tribe, Harithi moved to Marib in North Yemen as a young man due to the government of South Yemen becoming increasing hostility towards tribal customs and identity during the late 1960s and 1970s.

During the 1980s, Harithi travelled to Afghanistan to participate in the fight against the Soviet Union. During his time in the country, Harithi met and fought alongside Osama bin Laden, developing a close relationship with him by the end of the war.

Harithi returned to his family farm in Shabwah after the conclusion of the war. During the early 1990s, Harithi joined the Islamic Jihad in Yemen, an Islamist organization composed of former Afghan mujahideen. With the financial support of Bin Laden, he set up camps for the group in Shabwah, Marib and Saada governorates to train their members for attacks against the Yemeni Socialist Party.

During this time, Harithi frequently traveled to Sudan to visit Bin Laden. He reportedly acted as a bodyguard for Bin Laden during an instance where gunmen attempted to assassinate him at his home in Khartoum. The gun battle resulted in him gaining a permanent wound in his leg. Harithi later returned to Yemen to participate in the civil war in 1994, fighting alongside the Yemeni government against the Southern secessionist Democratic Republic of Yemen. Soon after the end of the war, Harithi moved to the United Arab Emirates, where he was arrested in 1997 before being released three months later. He then immediately moved to Afghanistan, where Bin Laden had relocated the year prior.

== Al-Qaeda in Yemen ==
Some time before 2000, while residing in Afghanistan, Harithi received orders from Bin Laden to travel back to Yemen to begin planning attacks. By that time, Bin Laden had already authorized Abd al-Rahim al-Nashiri to begin planning an attack on a United States Navy vessel in Yemen two years prior. Al-Nashiri's plan eventually culminated in the bombing of the USS Cole in October 2000. The United States government listed Harithi as one of the main planners of the attack. The US government eventually came to identify Harithi as the highest-ranking leader of AQY, placing him on a kill list alongside the likes of Bin Laden and Ayman al-Zawahiri.

Harithi, alongside senior AQY member Mohammed al-Ahdal, went into hiding during 2001 after being tipped off that they were wanted for questioning for their role in the USS Cole bombing. Between August and November 2001, the two hid in Hosun al-Jalal, a village in the rural areas of Marib Governorate. In November 2001, two months after the September 11 attacks, US President George W. Bush prioritized the arrest of Harithi and al-Ahdal as a "good first step" in defining Yemen's relations with the US during a meeting with Yemeni President Ali Abdullah Saleh. This eventually resulted in Yemeni soldiers executing a raid on Hosun al-Jalal to arrest both militants in December 2001. The raid failed, with both Harithi and al-Ahdal escaping and Yemeni forces suffering 18 casualties as they clashed with hostile Abidah tribesmen in the area.

According to the transcripts of interviews between investigators and AQY members convicted for the MV Limburg bombing in October 2002, the attack on the French oil tanker was conducted on the orders of Harithi.

== Death ==
On 3 November 2002, Harithi was killed in a drone strike alongside six other individuals linked to al-Qaeda, including Lackawanna Six member Kamal Derwish. A CIA-controlled Predator drone targeted the vehicle that the group of six were using while travelling through Marib. Harithi's killing represented the first instance of the US launching a drone strike outside of Afghanistan.

Harithi was buried in Shabwah on 9 November. His funeral was attended by about 30 people, most of them family and friends.

== See also ==
- Mohammed al-Ahdal
- Nasir al-Wuhayshi
