= 2008 attack on the United States embassy in Sanaa =

Terror attack in Yemen

- Part of the al-Qaeda insurgency in Yemen
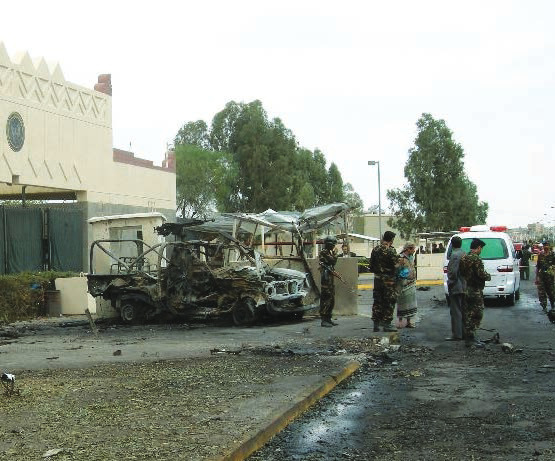
- Yemeni security personnel at the main gate to the embassy after the attack
- Location: 15°22′26.4″N 44°13′45.5″E; Embassy of the United States, Sanaa, Yemen
- Date: September 17, 2008; 9:13 – 9:55 a.m. (UTC+3)
- Target: Chancery
- Attack type: Car bombings; suicide bombings; mass shooting
- Deaths: 20 (including 7 perpetrators)
- Injuries: 10
- Perpetrator: Al-Qaeda in the South of the Arabian Peninsula
- No. of participants: 7

On September 17, 2008, an attack was carried out against the embassy of the United States in Sanaa, the capital of Yemen. Seven gunmen travelling in two car bombs attempted to enter the compound through the main entrance by masquerading as an official Yemeni delegation. At 9:13 a.m. they arrived at a checkpoint to the entrance, but their plan was foiled after a guard closed the drop bar to the main gate and sounded the alarm. Instead of blowing up the gate as planned, the first vehicle was rammed into a nearby military technical, while the second one later attempted to breach the walls but failed. Three gunmen controlled the entrance area and fired into the compound and at Yemeni security forces who besieged them before they had all died by approximately 9:55 a.m.

The attack left 20 people dead and 10 wounded. It was the deadliest attack against a US government facility outside of an active battlefield since the September 11 attacks. The only American who died was Susan Elbaneh, a Yemeni-American woman killed alongside her husband as they waited in line outside the embassy. Responsibility was claimed by al-Qaeda in the South of the Arabian Peninsula (AQSAP), which said the attackers had all attended a mosque together and that several of them attempted to join the Iraqi insurgency before deciding on an attack in Yemen.

The Federal Bureau of Investigation (FBI) worked with Yemeni authorities to investigate the attack. It was quickly linked to al-Qaeda, with AQSAP leader Nasir al-Wuhayshi being labelled its alleged mastermind and the perpetrators being linked to local training camps. The investigation had stalled by the next year due to a lack of bilateral cooperation. In 2015, an individual claiming to be a former AQSAP informant said the Yemeni government had foreknowledge of the attack and secretly provided support for it.

American officials including President George W. Bush condemned the attack and emphasized further counterterrorism cooperation with Yemen. It was also met with condemnation in Yemen and internationally. Analysts described the attack as sophisticated and unprecedented, and indicative of an al-Qaeda resurgence in the country. Retrospectively it has been considered "a landmark operation in the history of jihadism in Yemen". The country was thereon prioritized in the counterterrorism strategy of the Barack Obama administration. Another attack planned against the embassy in 2009 was met with military intervention.

== Background ==
Al-Qaeda underwent a resurgence in Yemen after a prison escape in 2006 freed several key militants. The year of 2008 witnessed an increase in attacks and propaganda releases by al-Qaeda-affiliated militant groups. One of these groups was the Soldiers' Brigade of Yemen, which claimed responsibility for the majority of the attacks, while the other was al-Qaeda in the South of the Arabian Peninsula (AQSAP), which was mostly engaged in publishing the online magazine Sada al-Malahem.

The embassy of the United States in Sanaa had long been a target of militant threats and violence, resulting in the diplomatic mission instilling heavy security measures. The most recent attack was an attempted mortar shelling on March 16, 2008, which failed and instead struck a nearby female high school. This was followed by further shelling against an embassy residential compound in Haddah on April 6, resulting in the embassy ordering an evacuation of non-essential personnel and relatives. These incidents were attributed to the Soldiers' Brigade of Yemen. In August, local security forces conducted a raid in Tarim which killed five of their members, including leader Hamza al-Quaiti. The raid effectively dismantled what was a small, highly-localized cell of the larger al-Qaeda presence in the country, but the success was in some part interpreted as a total victory against al-Qaeda, as the State Department soon rescinded its evacuation order citing an improvement in the local security situation.

In response to the raid, the Soldiers' Brigade of Yemen issued a statement through the jihadist internet forum al-Ikhlas on August 19 threatening revenge for the killing of Quaiti. This was followed by AQSAP posting a teaser on September 9 for an upcoming issue of Sada al-Malahem, a common indicator of an attack being imminent. Furthermore, al-Ikhlas began advertising a "special message" from Osama bin Laden set to commemorate the September 11 attacks. American officials feared Bin Laden could use the message to encourage an attack in Yemen. However, al-Ikhlas was shut down, possibly by the National Security Agency, on the evening of September 10, preventing the release of new jihadist material and relieving embassy personnel.

== Attack ==
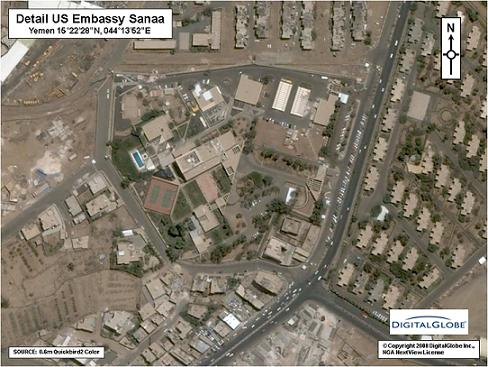
Overhead view of the embassy

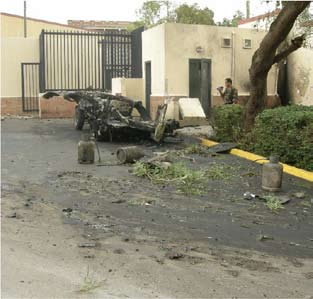
Remnants of the second car bomb

The attack involved seven militants, each armed and equipped with suicide vests, and two explosive-laden Suzuki jeeps. The vehicles were modified with improvised armor and holes in their roofs for gunmen. The plan was to have one vehicle detonate at the main gate of the embassy compound and breach it, allowing the other vehicle and fighters on the ground to enter and raid the chancery, where they would kill as many people as possible. To reach the gate, the group impersonated a Yemeni government delegation, fitting their vehicles with paint jobs and license plates consistent with those used by the military while wearing Central Security Forces (CSF) fatigues. They were likely attempting to capitalize off an early morning attack during Ramadan, as the security would potentially be less attentive and most nearby businesses were closed.

The two vehicles successfully passed by a cordon on the street to the embassy ran by the CSF at around 9:10 a.m. local time. At 9:13 a.m., one vehicle approached the first entrance checkpoint at the northern edge of the embassy. A militant told the two guards manning the checkpoint they were transporting a military general for a meeting with ambassador Stephen Seche. Already suspicious due to the rarity of Seche conducting meetings at the embassy itself, one of the guards began to approach the vehicle before a gunman appeared from the roof hole and opened fire. The approaching guard ran to cover, but his partner, Mukhtar al-Faqih, waited a few more seconds to close the drop arm barrier at the checkpoint while sounding the alarm before he was gunned down.

As this happened, three other militants exited the vehicle and killed a nearby CSF soldier. Around 20 seconds later, the other vehicle containing a driver and passenger reached the scene. One of the militants managed to lift the dragon's teeth at the checkpoint and allowed for the convoy to pass through. The two vehicles and the three gunmen on the ground headed through the external embassy access road. With the plot foiled and security forces alerted, the occupants of the first vehicle decided to go against the plan and rammed their car bomb into a military technical parked adjacent to the gate. Numerous civilians waiting in line by the gate were killed by the blast and the shooting.

The first vehicle failed to blow open the gate as planned, forcing rest of the group to search for weak points from which they could breach the embassy. From 9:15 a.m. onwards, CCTV footage exhibited several militants probing the front of the embassy on foot while firing through openings in the walls and across the road. The drivers of the second vehicle spent several minutes looking for a point to attack before deciding on the pedestrian entrance in the parking lot. At around 9:22 a.m., once the three gunmen took cover, the two occupants drove into the wall around 50 yards from the main gate and detonated their vehicle.

The second bomb failed to breach the wall of the embassy. The propane tanks fitted in the vehicle to amplify the explosion were instead sent flying across the area. With no way to enter, the three remaining gunmen continued firing their weapons at the embassy but did not harm anyone. At around 9:33 a.m., they opened fire at a fire truck arriving at the scene, forcing it to retreat. Shortly afterwards, one of the gunmen set off their suicide vest next to a wall near the gate in an attempt to create an opening, but was unsuccessful. Another militant later attempted the same thing and failed. The final militant then returned near the checkpoint from which they entered and detonated his vest. He may have attempted to surrender to a police officer while cooking a grenade, though the officer managed to retreat before he blew himself up. The militants were in control of the area for a total of 42 minutes.

=== Embassy personnel response ===
Seche was in his office on the third floor of the chancery when the first explosion occurred. He ran down the hallway to the office of the Regional Security Officer (RSO), Nicholas Collura, intending to coordinate with him. After realizing he was not present, he went to Post 1, the "command-and-control center" of the embassy, where he was let in by a Marine Security Guard. Viewing the remaining security cameras active at the blast site, Seche noted the attackers "didn't look like they were in a hurry... these men had just killed a lot of people, executing some of them, but on the screen they looked too casual to be murderers." He grew increasingly frustrated as Yemeni security forces failed to neutralize the attackers.

At his office on the first floor of the chancery, Federal Bureau of Investigation (FBI) legal attaché Richard Schwein guided two female colleagues into a safe room immediately after the explosion before informing FBI headquarters and his assistant Susan Ostrobinski, who was in Ethiopia at the time, of an attack. Collura was at the nearby British embassy when he received a call at 9:15 a.m. informing him of the attack, whereupon he drove to the front of the US embassy and found Yemeni security forces pinned down by gunfire. Fearing the embassy had been breached, he ran to a back door of the compound, which was locked, before going to a CSF base adjacent to the northwest corner of the compound, where he unsuccessfully attempted to convince a group of CSF soldiers to mobilize, even with a Yemeni surveillance detection officer translating his orders.

Collura and the officer then went by themselves to the northeastern corner of the compound wall near where the attackers were present. An auxiliary gate controlled remotely by Post 1 was a turn away from the corner. Collura phoned Post 1 and coordinated to quickly open the gate and allow them to enter before shutting it. As the two were making their first attempt, the second car bomb detonated nearby, knocking them to the ground and forcing them to retreat to cover unnoticed. The second attempt, which took place just after the final militant had died, was successful. Once inside, Collura went to Post 1 to establish contact with Seche. He then met with Schwein and formulated a team to secure the rest of the compound. After arming themselves, they set out to retrieve stranded civilians before searching every building in the compound. At 9:58 a.m., Collura declared to embassy staff that the threat was neutralized.

David Turnbull, a former consular officer at the embassy, recalled the alarm system sounding off in the building before the first explosion, whereupon he and others were ordered into a duck and cover position for more than an hour and a half as the attack took place. He and his colleagues counted six explosions and gunfire, but noted that it was "uncomfortably quiet" apart from that. The staff was escorted to a safe room at around 11:00 a.m. followed by people in the consular waiting room. While Seche gave periodic status updates, embassy section heads worked throughout the situation as he helped the spokesperson with answering calls from international media and nurses tended to wounded guards. Later in the day, the embassy was evacuated by a military escort.

== Casualties ==
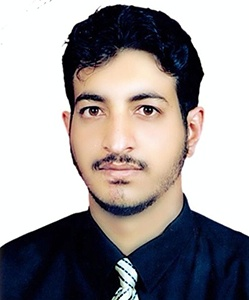
Mukhtar al-Faqih, a Foreign Service National killed in the attack

Including the perpetrators, a total of 20 people died in the attack. The toll was originally reported as 17 people prior to the death of three injured civilians days afterwards and the revelation that seven militants took part in it and not six as originally reported by media. The final death toll included seven attackers, five CSF soldiers, Mukhtar al-Faqih (classified by the State Department as a Foreign Service National), and seven civilians. No American diplomats or embassy personnel were harmed. A further three Yemeni security officers and seven civilians were injured, some of whom were children living across the street to the embassy.

This casualty toll made it the most significant terrorist attack in Yemen since the USS Cole bombing of 2000. It was the deadliest attack on a US government facility outside of Iraq or Afghanistan, both civilian and military, since the September 11 attacks, and the deadliest against an American embassy since the 1998 bombings.

Among those listed as civilian casualties included 26-year-old Indian nurse Rani Krishnani, who was commuting to work when she was killed by a car bomb detonation, and Susan Elbaneh, an 18-year-old Yemeni-American high school senior and native of Lackawanna, New York. Elbaneh had recently married her Yemeni husband, Abdul Jaleel, prior to the attack. The two were waiting in line outside the embassy in order file paperwork for Jaleel to move to the US when they were both killed. She was the only American who died in the attack.

Susan was a cousin of fellow Lackawanna native Jaber Elbaneh, one of the FBI's most wanted militants in Yemen for allegedly being a high-profile al-Qaeda member and former Lackawanna Six associate. Federal agents visited the Elbaneh residence in Lackawanna later on the day of the attack and confirmed the familial connection. They were told by Susan's relatives that she had not been in contact with Jaber since she was a young girl. The officials viewed the linkage as simply a coincidence and assured that "she's not a bad guy." Elbaneh family members publicly rejected any connections made between Susan and the attack which killed her, calling her a victim of terrorism.

== Responsibility ==
The attack was perpetrated by AQSAP. In the sixth issue of Sada al-Malahem, released on November 9, 2008, was a statement dated to October 30 claiming responsibility for the attack and providing details on it. The organization proclaimed it was acting on the instructions of Bin Laden to expel Westerners from the Arabian Peninsula. An article in the magazine listed six strategic objectives of the attack to portray the embassy as "the epicenter of the Crusader military presence in Yemen, as well as a den of iniquity and a piece of American territory", while also justifying the killing of its Muslim employees. The group continued to argue for the relevancy of the Arabian Peninsula in global jihad, declaring "there is no difference between the American Embassy in Kabul and Baghdad or Riyadh and Sana'a, and similarly martyrdom in Afghanistan and Iraq is the same as in Sana'a and Riyadh" at the end of their statement.

The attack took place on the 17th of Ramadan to coincide with the anniversary of the Battle of Badr, described as the greatest achievement of the Islamic prophet Muhammad's military career. Abu Hurayra al-Sana'ani wrote about the significance of the attack, while Abu Hammam al-Qahtani offered comparisons to the 2003 Riyadh compound bombings, labeling them "the Badr of Sana'a" and "the Badr of Riyadh" respectively. The claim of responsibility includes a detailed summary of events during the attack, albeit falsified in some parts to claim a greater success. They alleged that administrative officer Jeffrey Patneau was among those killed, although the embassy issued a statement clarifying that he died in an unrelated traffic collision later on in September.

=== Perpetrators ===
Location of al-Hudaydah, where the attackers first met

The seven individuals who carried out the attack were referred to in al-Qaeda propaganda as the "Abu Ali al-Harithi Brigades", referencing a former leader killed in a drone strike in 2002. They had reportedly met each other at the al-Furqan mosque in al-Hudaydah. The leader of the group was identified as Lutf Bahr, the 40-year-old imam of the mosque, while the other six men were described as his students. Bahr likely held only a spiritual leadership role, with Mahmud al-Zukayri instead being the one in charge militarily. Of the other militants involved, several of them had previously been imprisoned, and three may have gone through a government-mandated jihadist rehabilitation program. Two of them, Zayn al-Tuhmas and Yahya Fatayni, had unsuccessfully attempted to join the Iraqi insurgency, while Rashid al-Wasabi intended to go but was convinced to instead take part in an attack in Yemen.

The exact links between the perpetrators and AQSAP are uncertain. Tuhmas may have been involved in coordination between the two sides; a biography published by the group wrote that he "wanted to go to Iraq, but he was imprisoned, [so] he decided to wage jihad on the Arabian Peninsula. Then God led a group [of motivated men] his way, and he proposed his idea to them and they liked it. So he began preparing and training them by sending them to secret training locations". Despite contradictory reports by Yemeni authorities, AQSAP itself stated that none of the militants were involved in foreign conflicts.

Researcher Thomas Hegghammer argued the perpetrators had formed a group to attack the embassy on their own, and later approached AQSAP to receive "operational assistance." Gregory D. Johnsen believed the cell "had the operational details left up to themselves somewhat," with AQSAP providing them with general guidance.

=== False claimant ===
Hours after it occurred, a little-known group called Islamic Jihad in Yemen claimed responsibility for the attack in a statement attributed to Abu Ghayth al-Yamani. The statement demanded the release of militants incarcerated by the Yemeni government. This claim of responsibility was disputed by Yemeni officials, who instead levied blame on the local al-Qaeda affiliate. Yemeni and American analysts alike mentioned that it was not unprecedented for al-Qaeda in Yemen to claim an attack under several different names in order to amplify the perceived jihadist threat. Johnsen expressed doubt of any true linkage between Islamic Jihad in Yemen and the attack, claiming "some individual such as Abu Ghayth al-Yamani hears the news and dashes off a fax, and then a day or two later the group responsible posts an official statement claiming responsibility." CBS News noted at least once prior instance in which Islamic Jihad in Yemen claimed responsibility for an attack in the country, only for it to be debunked and confirmed as an al-Qaeda attack.

== Investigation ==
The embassy announced the US government would collaborate with Yemeni authorities to investigate the attack, and would temporarily close to accommodate the authorities. A Yemeni government source said American officials, possibly from the FBI, would be sent to lead the initiative. Embassy spokesperson Ryan Gliha said FBI deployments were common after attacks against American foreign interests. The next day, the embassy was cordoned off from traffic by security forces as American investigators were seen examining the area where the assault took place. CNN correspondent Ben Wedeman was permitted to set foot in the entrance area by Yemeni security officials but was later ushered off after American personnel had noticed him.

A preliminary report by Yemeni intelligence determined the attack was perpetrated by individuals linked to al-Qaeda, and had involved "substantial weaponry, ample funding and elaborate planning." Investigators probed possible connections with al-Qaeda cells in Yemen, including those linked to Jaber Elbaneh, and remaining cells in Saudi Arabia. In the 24 hours after the attack local authorities arrested 25 suspected militants from across the country who were interrogated by both American and Yemeni investigators. The Associated Press noted that many individuals are usually detained after a major terrorist attack in Yemen; diplomatic commentators speaking to CNN believed that authorities routinely detain "the usual suspects, and then nothing comes out of it." By September 22, a total of 50 people were arrested in connection to the attack. Among them included Adnan al-Qadhi, a military officer believed to have supplied the military license plates used on the vehicles during the attack. He was kept in prison for multiple months, but due to his membership in the powerful Sanhan tribe he was released without charge by early 2009.

By late September, US national security officials were of the belief that AQSAP leader Nasir al-Wuhayshi was the mastermind of the attack. Terrorism expert Abdulelah Haider Shaye rejected alleged reports in October of AQSAP commander Qasim al-Raymi having died in the attack, claiming the perpetrators were "new personalities who the FBI was not able to identify". A Yemeni security official publicly confirmed al-Qaeda's connection to the attack on November 1, stating the perpetrators had trained at al-Qaeda camps in Hadhramaut and Marib governorates, and that three of them had recently returned from fighting in the Iraqi insurgency. By the time that Saudi militant and former Guantanamo Bay detainee Said Ali al-Shihri had emerged in early 2009 as a leader of al-Qaeda in the Arabian Peninsula, American officials were reportedly suspecting his involvement in the attack. This was disputed by Johnsen, who said Shihri would have not been in Yemen at the time of the attack's planning.

Although authorities from both nations initially cooperated with each other, Yemen granting the FBI full access to evidence for the case and the US providing local authorities with forensic evidence, the investigation had stalled by 2009 as cooperation diminished.

=== False claimant trial ===
Yemeni authorities arrested six individuals on September 21 in relation to the attack. The Ministry of Interior issued a statement the next day identifying them as members of Islamic Jihad in Yemen. They were charged with forming a cell responsible for issuing statements on the internet threatening terrorist attacks against numerous public figures, foreign embassies, and non-governmental organisations. Among those arrested included Abu Ghayth al-Yamani.

Shaye viewed the arrests as part of the government's information war with jihadists. He discredited the notion that Islamic Jihad in Yemen were the perpetrators of the attack, citing the ease at which security forces managed to capture the cell in contrast to the complexity and expertise needed to plan such an attack in the first place. In October, Yemeni president Ali Abdullah Saleh claimed the cell was linked to the intelligence services of Israel. The Israeli foreign ministry dismissed the allegations as "totally ridiculous", while spokesperson Yigal Palmor called it "really far-fetched" and "yet another victory for the proponents of conspiracy theories".

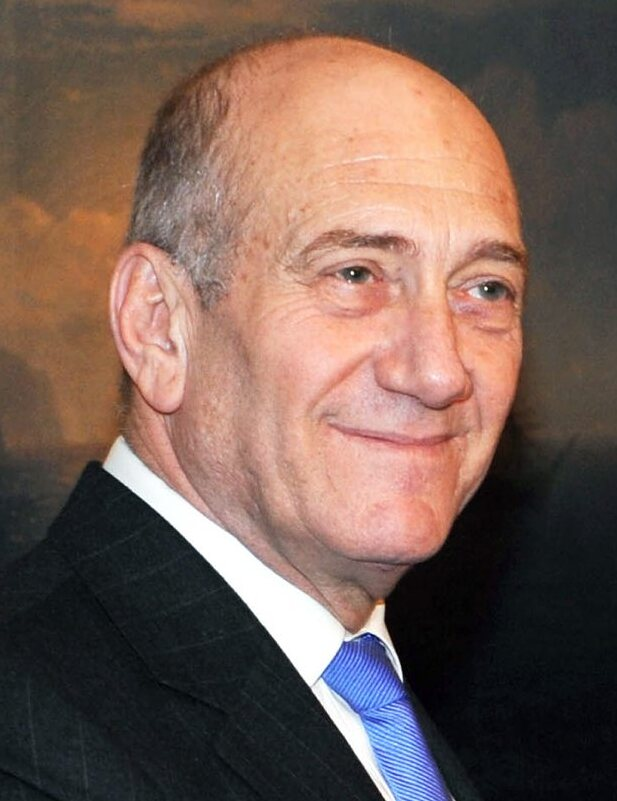
Islamic Jihad of Yemen, which issued a false claim for the attack, was accused of coordinating with Israeli prime minister Ehud Olmert.

The trial for the cell began on January 10, 2009, with the Yemeni government accusing three of the six men of issuing false attack claims as Islamic Jihad in Yemen from May to September 2008, and admitting to coordinating with Mossad and Israeli prime minister Ehud Olmert. Abu Ghayth al-Yamani, identified as 26-year-old Bassam al-Haidari, was accused of directly communicating with Olmert through emails, including one which said: "We are the Organisation of Islamic Jihad and you are Jews, but you are honest, and we are ready to do anything". Olmert allegedly responded by agreeing to provide them support "to become an obstacle in the Middle East."

The court found the three guilty on March 23, sentencing Haidari to death and the other two defendants, Ali al-Mahfal and Ammar al-Raimi, to five-year and three-year prison sentences, respectively. All three appealed their sentences. Haidari's death sentence was upheld by a court decision on April 2, 2010, along with Raimi's sentence, although Mahfal's sentence was reduced from five years to three. Lawyer and human rights activist Abdul-Rahman Ali Barman rejected Haidiri's case as politically motivated due to his opposition to the government, and said he was preparing to bring it to the Supreme Court.

=== Independent investigations ===
In December 2008, Mareb Press published an interview with Soldiers' Brigade of Yemen leader Hamza Ali Saleh al-Dhayani, who local authorities listed as a suspect in the attack. Dhayani said Yemen's Political Security Organization was coordinating some attacks with al-Qaeda, and that the attack had positive effects for the government by "reviving its role in fighting terror and its claim to be on the front line", thus boosting its international standings and support. He profiled the perpetrators as would-be Iraqi foreign fighters, and claimed they were motivated by torture suffered in Yemeni prisons.

An investigative documentary produced by Al Jazeera and released on June 4, 2015, provided an account of the attack from the perspective of Hani Muhammad Mujahid, an al-Qaeda member working as an informant for the Yemeni government at the time. Mujahid said he notified his intelligence handlers of the attack on three different occasions before it took place. He also provided them with details regarding the attack itself and where it was being prepared. According to Mujahid's testimony, Ammar Muhammad Abdullah Saleh, son of the President and then-deputy of the National Security Bureau, used him as a courier to help funnel explosives and weapons to Raymi which were utilized in the attack.

Terrorism expert and former British intelligence officer Richard Barrett believed Mujahid's claims to an extent, but expressed skepticism regarding Saleh's knowledge of the attack and Raymi's collusion with the government. Schwein, who took part in the FBI investigation, said: "Complicity on the part of one or more members of the Yemeni government would be very disappointing, but it wouldn't necessarily be surprising."

== Aftermath ==
Soon after the attack, the State Department issued a notice recommending the departure of all non-emergency staff at the embassy and their families from Yemen, along with another notice warning US citizens of travelling to Yemen outside of the capital. By the next morning, work had begun to repair the damaged exterior of the embassy compound, including the main gate. The embassy resumed standard operations on September 20.

Of the personnel who responded to the attack, the State Department posthumously awarded Faqih with the Thomas Jefferson Star for Foreign Service and Collura with their Award for Valor, while Schwein received a Medal of Valor from the FBI. By 2014, the embassy had hired Muhammad al-Faqih, a younger brother of Mukhtar, to work as a security guard. Johnsen credited Faqih with having prevented the militants from reaching the chancery and massacring the people inside through his actions at the security checkpoint.

=== Response ===
External videos
- September 17, 2008 State Department Daily Briefing, C-SPAN

At a press conference soon after it took place, State Department spokesman Sean McCormack provided an account of the events during the attack. He urged the Yemeni government to address the threat of terrorism in the country and signalled willingness to "work with them to build up their capabilities at this point." He stated that Secretary of State Condoleezza Rice had spoken to President Saleh that morning to address concerns regarding counterterrorism cooperation. Both McCormack and Rice praised Yemeni security forces for their response during the attack.

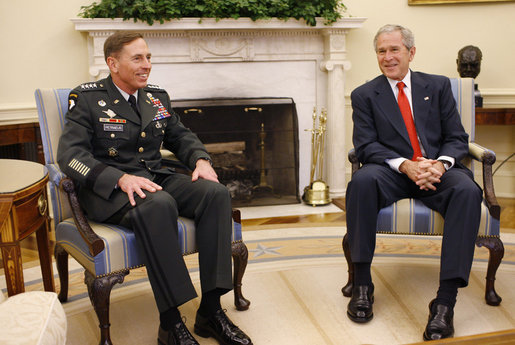
US president George W. Bush condemned the attack after a meeting with General David Petraeus (pictured).

President George W. Bush was briefed on the attack the same day, and said the US would work to strengthen counterterrorism cooperation with the Yemeni government. Speaking at the White House shortly after a meeting with General David Petraeus, Bush called it "a reminder that we are at war with extremists who will murder innocent people to achieve their ideological objectives", and said the perpetrators were attempting to "try to cause the United States to lose our nerve and to withdraw from regions of the world." Then-senator and presidential candidate Barack Obama issued a statement calling for increased counterterrorism support for "nations like Yemen that are on the front lines in the fight against terrorism."

The death of Elbaneh was mourned by the Arab-American community in Lackawanna. At her Lackawanna High School, prinicial Peter Hazzan said grief counselors were deployed to help students cope with the loss. A memorial ceremony for her was held at the school on September 19, attended by her family, students and others in the local Muslim-American community. The Council on American–Islamic Relations condemned the attack, while Khalid Qazi, president of the Muslim Public Affairs Council of Western New York, cited Elbaneh's killing as a demonstration of the indiscriminate nature of terrorism.

Saleh delivered his first public remarks on the attack on September 19 during a speech at al-Hudaydah, condemning it and pledging to apprehend the perpetrators. He said that authorities "cannot prevent a terrorist from dying because he has decided to die, and this is a result of an ignorant and backward mindset." Yemeni officials characterized the attack as an act of retaliation to recent counterterrorism operations. Mohammed al-Basha, spokesperson for the Yemeni embassy in Washington, D.C., said: "Yemen is a battlefield in the war on terror and we are losing lives". Foreign minister Abu Bakr al-Qirbi requested further support from the US to combat al-Qaeda, but told The Washington Post they would continue to deny certain counterterrorism-related requests seen as incongruent with Yemeni law.

According to Hasan al-Zaidi of the Yemen Post, the attack was condemned by the Yemeni public, political sphere and civil society. It was also condemned by the international community, eliciting statements from the United Nations, the Gulf Cooperation Council and the European Union, as well as several nations such as Canada and Japan.

=== Analysis ===
Analysts and commentators at the time interpreted the attack as an indication of al-Qaeda's resurgence in Yemen. Economist Intelligence Unit analyst Laura James called it a predictable response to the Yemeni government's counterterrorism operations and considered it a blow to their campaign. Intelligence consultant firm Stratfor referred to it as highly sophisticated and assessed that it "marks a significant increase in jihadist capabilities in the country." Local journalist and political commentator Mohammed al-Qadhi said the attack represented "a change in strategy" as "they want to reach their targets directly." Michael Scheuer, former head of the Bin Laden Issue Station in the Central Intelligence Agency, noted the embassy was a "hard target" as opposed to previous attacks on tourists and private companies, signalling that "they have more confidence and that they've rebuilt to the extent that they can do something like this."

Naval Postgraduate School professor John Arquilla called the attack "an example of their ability to strike anywhere on the battlefield at any time". Scheuer claimed that, in the wake of a declining affiliate in Iraq, al-Qaeda leadership may have been interested in mounting attacks in other nations. Former FBI agent and USS Cole bombing investigator Ali Soufan said the sophistication of the attack suggested that its planners were either previously incarcerated or experienced militants from Iraq or Somalia. He also believed that Wuhayshi likely received approval from central al-Qaeda leaders or possibly Bin Laden himself. Analyst Mustafa Alani believed it would herald more advanced operations by al-Qaeda in Yemen, some of them possibly reaching the Gulf Arab states.

In The Evolution of the Global Terrorist Threat, Hegghammer writes: "The 2008 Sanaa bombing was a landmark operation in the history of jihadism in Yemen... it marked the coming of age of a new, second generation of al-Qaeda in Yemen and placed AQSAP firmly on the map as an al-Qaeda affiliate to be reckoned with." He notes the attack did not lead to "significant operational momentum" nor a large increase in recruits, but considered the fact that the group had survived the crackdown initiated by the Yemeni government in its aftermath a victory in and of itself. A report on the history of al-Qaeda in Yemen by the Combating Terrorism Center at West Point similarly regards the attack as "a dramatic leap in planning and tactical sophistication", while also noting the development of AQSAP's propaganda displayed in its claim of responsibility.

=== Impact ===
The attack was an embarrassment for the Yemeni government and strained its relations with the United States, which had already been tense due to a history of inconsistent dedication towards combating al-Qaeda. The revelation that Wuhayshi, who escaped from Yemeni custody two years prior, was involved in the attack, had likely further inflamed tensions between Yemen and the outgoing Bush administration. British ambassador to Yemen Timothy Torlot noted that although Western interests had routinely been targeted for attacks in Yemen, the attack on the embassy had a much larger impact. The US had primarily been concerned with terrorist threats in tribal territories rather than the capital. Former US ambassador to Yemen Edmund Hull said it served as "a wake-up call for all of Washington." Along with a shooting at the US consulate in Istanbul during 2008, the attack contributed to a significant boost in funding for the "Embassy Security, Construction, Maintenance" subsection in the international affairs budget of the 2009 federal budget.

With momentum gained from the attack, AQSAP merged with the remnants of the Saudi Arabian al-Qaeda affiliate early the following year to form al-Qaeda in the Arabian Peninsula (AQAP). The Obama administration was keen on addressing the threat posed by AQAP, which in their view was put on display by the attack. Counterterrorism aid to Yemen surged while national security officials regularly communicated with the Yemeni government. These meetings culminated in Saleh secretly granting the US permission to conduct covert military operations against AQAP. When US intelligence determined that another attack on the embassy was being prepared by AQAP, Obama authorized Joint Special Operations Command to conduct a missile strike operation on December 17, 2009, to neutralize the threat, marking the start of a prolonged military campaign against AQAP.

== See also ==
- 2021 occupation of the United States embassy compound in Yemen
- List of terrorist incidents in 2008
