= Soldiers' Brigade of Yemen =

Jihadist organization in Yemen (2006–2008)

- كتائب جند اليمان
- Flag used by the group, typically with its name written on the bottom
- Other name: Jund al-Yemen Brigades
- Founding leader: Hamza al-Quyati †
- Dates active: c. 2006 – 11 August 2008
- Country: Yemen
- Allegiance: al-Qaeda
- Headquarters: Tarim, Hadhramaut Governorate
- Ideology: Salafi jihadism; Takfirism
- Status: Inactive
- Part of: Al-Qaeda in Yemen
- Wars: Al-Qaeda insurgency in Yemen

Al-Qaeda in the Arabian Peninsula—Soldiers' Brigade of Yemen (Note: Arabic: تنظيم قاعدة الجهاد في جزيرة العرب—كتائب جند اليمن, romanized: Tanẓīm Qā‘idat al-Jihād fī Jazīrat al-‘Arab—Katāʾib Jund al-Yemen, lit. 'Organization of Jihad's Base in the Arabian Peninsula—Soldiers' Brigade of Yemen'.) (AQAP—SBY), often referred to simply as the Soldiers' Brigade of Yemen (Note: Arabic: كتائب جند اليمن, romanized: Katāʾib Jund al-Yemen, lit. 'Soldiers' Brigade of Yemen'.) (SBY) or the Jund al-Yemen Brigades, was a jihadist militant group in Yemen which operated from 2006 to 2008. Founded by Yemeni al-Qaeda veteran Hamza al-Quyati and based in the city of Tarim, SBY surfaced in early 2008 and conducted several attacks throughout the rest of the year. It was noted to have a more radical position on attacks directly targeting Yemeni government forces compared to past jihadists. Following a suicide bombing at a police station in Seiyun, security forces raided SBY safehouse's in Tarim in August 2008, killing Quyati and leading to the group's end.

During its time of activity, SBY publicly operated alongside al-Qaeda in Yemen (AQY), considered the primary al-Qaeda affiliate in the country at the time, and claimed several attacks previously attributed to AQY. Analysts have said the two groups, rather than being rivals, were part of a single organization.

== Overview ==
=== Background and organization ===
SBY was founded and led by Hamza al-Quyati, a Saudi Arabia-born Yemeni militant who was a member of al-Qaeda in Afghanistan before being arrested and imprisoned while in Yemen. During this time, he "assumed the role of elder statesman" among fellow the militants detained alongside him, and was involved in networking alongside Fawaz al-Rabeiee and Qasim al-Raymi, the latter whom he had befriended in Afghanistan.

Quyati was among the 23 prisoners who escaped from a Sanaa prison in February 2006, two of whom would form the core leadership of AQY, Raymi and Nasir al-Wuhayshi. Jane Novak of FDD's Long War Journal claimed the three all had "strong ties to al-Qaeda." Soon after the escape, Quyati fled to the city of Tarim in his native Hadhramaut, and there established a small militant cell. Post-mortem analysis of his group notes that it was extremely localized; five of its members, including group leader Quyati, hailed from Hadhramaut's provincial capital of Mukalla, and two others were from the nearby areas al-Qatn and Shabwah.

=== Emergence and operations ===
Although evidence exists of SBY dating as far back as 2006, the first public mention of SBY came on 24 February 2008, when it released a statement on jihadist forum al-Ikhlas claiming responsibility for several previous attacks by AQY. A month prior, Quyati and his men had ambushed a Belgian tourist convoy in Hadhramaut, killing four people. SBY published its first video through an Islamist website on 30 March, which commemorated the slain Rabeiee and contained a previous audio recording of Osama bin Laden criticizing Yemeni president Ali Abdullah Saleh and judge Hamoud al-Hitar, head of Yemen's jihadist rehabilitation program.

From January to August 2008, SBY is believed to have conducted at least 16 attacks, primarily involving small arms and mortars and targeting Yemeni security forces, oil installations, and foreign interests and tourists. Attacks claimed by SBY constituted the majority of al-Qaeda activity at the time as AQY was likely building up its strength. SBY also published at least 13 online statements during this period, "typically a combination of after-action reports and calls to jihad." Despite the rapid pace of their campaign, a Combating Terrorism Center report considered most of SBY's attacks to be failures, with none of their mortar attacks against oil installations and Western embassies leading to any notable damage or casualties. The Gulf Research Center said the operations reflected a "lack of battle and planning experience, technical skills, training, and the lack of resources."

Analysts and commentators described Quyati as a leading figure among the second generation of jihadists in Yemen with an uncompromising stance against the Yemeni state. He espoused targeting of foreign nationals as well as the Yemeni government and security forces, which the SBY "encouraged new recruits to shift the focus of their hostility" towards. He reportedly rejected dialogue with Political Security Organization director Ghaleb al-Qamesh, who commonly negotiated with jihadists on behalf of the government. SBY's lack of success in targeting Western interests and incurring of Yemeni casualties drew concern from jihadists outside of Yemen. A statement attributed to al-Qaeda posted to al-Ikhlas on 31 May urged SBY "to return to the days of attacks like those on the USS Cole and the Limburg and the like," and to refrain from attacking Yemeni government targets, differentiating them from attacks on Iraqi security forces.

Mashjari (right) in an SBY promotional photograph

Quyati's first public appearance as the leader of SBY came through a video statement released on 23 July, in which he referred to Qamesh as the "Sharon of Yemen" and vowed to free imprisoned militants. This was followed by a suicide car bombing at a police station in Seiyun on 25 July which killed one security officer. The attack represented a tactical shift in that it directly targeted security forces, and has been considered the only relatively sophisticated attack done by the group. The bomber, Ahmed al-Mashjari, was recruited locally in Hadhramaut.

=== Demise and aftermath ===
The Seiyun attack provoked outrage among the Yemeni public due to numerous civilians casualties. In response, Quyati and his group hunkered down in their safehouses in Tarim. A tip from a local resident led to authorities attempting to search the houses on 10 August, followed by intense clashes with security forces overnight into 11 August. The operation ended in the killing of five SBY members, including Quyati, and the capture of two others. The 13th statement from the group was issued through al-Ikhlas on 19 August vowing revenge for the killing of Quyati.

The statement was followed by an attack on the United States embassy in Sanaa in September by AQY, but it would nonetheless be the final action of SBY as it was effectively destroyed by the raid, and the group would claim no further attacks from thereon. The formation of al-Qaeda in the Arabian Peninsula (AQAP) in January 2009 as a merger between AQY and the Saudi affiliate of al-Qaeda, and unanimous support for the decision from the jihadist sphere within Yemen, suggested that AQAP had absorbed whatever remained of SBY. Prolific AQAP bombmaker Ibrahim al-Asiri has been linked to Quyati and other leaders of SBY.

In March, a group of 11 Yemenis, four Syrians, and a Saudi, referred to as the "Tarim cell", were tried by a Yemeni court for conducting at least 13 attacks on behalf of Quyati and SBY. Six of them were sentenced to death in July 2009, while the other 10 were issued prison sentences ranging from eight to 15 years. In July 2010, an appeals court overturned death sentences of two men in exchange for a 12-year prison sentence, while five others had their 15-year prison sentences reduced to eight.

== Relationship with al-Qaeda in Yemen ==
The relationship between SBY and AQY was debated by analysts during the former's period of activity. Heinrich Matthee of the intelligence firm Control Risks referred to AQY as the "more sophisticated" group and one with indirect connections to al-Qaeda, which was responsible for the attacks on two oil installations in 2006 and the suicide bombing at the Temple of Awwam in 2007. Some Yemeni analysts suggested the two groups had split, although no solid evidence exists of this being the case.

Princeton University specialist Gregory D. Johnsen has said that SBY and AQY were "loose cells of the same organization" rather than separate groups. He cites SBY's claim for the assassination of Ali Mahmud Qasaylah and AQY eulogizing one of the attackers afterwards as evidence of the groups sharing operatives, suggesting any split was "more a tactical ploy than a divisive rupture within the organization". Video statements from pairs of suicide bombers in the 2006 attacks, operations most likely masterminded by Rabeiee and claimed by AQY, show them behind a flag bearing SBY's name. Although it was likely connected to Raymi, SBY claimed responsibility for the Temple of Awwam bombing, and a video recording of the militant who carried out the attack has him declare he was doing so for SBY as revenge for the killing of Rabeiee. He later appears to mention both AQY and SBY interchangeably, which according to Johnsen suggests there was no operational difference between the two and that they operated within a single network. The bomber also mentioned a desire to "expel the infidels from the Arabian Peninsula", a common phrase used in every SBY statement as well as in articles of the AQY e-magazine Sada al-Malahem written by Nayef Mohammed al-Qahtani. Documents found in the raid on the Tarim safehouse's also linked Qahtani to SBY. In The Evolution of the Global Terrorist Threat, Thomas Hegghammer writes: "in hindsight, the two entities were most likely part of the same network, one that cultivated two separate organizational identities for strategic reasons."
