= Capital punishment in Yemen =

Capital punishment is a legal penalty in Yemen. Per capita, Yemen has one of the highest execution rates in the world. Capital punishment is typically carried out by shooting, and executions occasionally take place in public. In addition to being the only individual in the country with the authority to grant clemency, the President of Yemen must ratify all executions handed down by any court before they are carried out. Since 2014, large parts of the north and north-west of the country are under the control of the extremist Houthi rebel group, who have presided over an expansion in the use of the death penalty.

== Legal procedure ==
Like most countries, the Yemeni legal system exists within the framework of a three-tier structure. At the lowest level of jurisprudence are the courts of first instance, established to preside over all different varieties of cases. These range from criminal, civil, commercial, personal status, court-martial, and other miscellaneous offences classified as "special cases" under the penal code (e.g., kidnappings, grand larceny). After trials are held at the lower levels of the Yemeni justice system, there is the option for both the defendant and the relatives of the victim to submit an appeal to an intermediate-level appellate court, which has broad powers to elevate or commute sentences at its discretion. Finally, if legal disputes still remain, then the issue is brought to the Supreme Court of Yemen as a last resort. There are no jury trials in the country, and cases are only adjudicated by individual judges.

Although the Yemeni constitution arranges for the separation of powers between different branches of government, the judiciary is subordinate to the executive branch in practice. The Supreme Judicial Council (SJC) is a small committee established by the federal government to oversee matters pertaining to the Yemeni legal system. The SJC, which is accountable only to the President of Yemen, can directly appoint or dismiss judges without any judicial oversight. In addition, the President must ratify all death sentences before they are carried out, and is the only person in the country with the authority to enact a stay of execution.

Yemen applies Sharia, the Islamic system of law, which serves as the basis for all legislation in the country. Many nonviolent capital offences, such as homosexuality or blasphemy, are derived from a strict interpretation of select Quranic verses. Another facet of Islamic jurisprudence recognized in Yemeni courts is Qisas. As a means of legal retribution, the relatives of a murder victim have the option to either demand the death penalty for the accused party, or to pardon them for their crimes. However, the extent to which this is actually enforced remains a subject for dispute, as the Yemeni justice system has allegedly performed executions despite objections from the families of murder victims. Conversely, death sentences have been reapplied after an initial pardon issued by the President as a result of pressure from relatives.

== Capital crimes ==
Capital crimes include violent acts like murder, rape, or terrorism, but the death penalty is also used in cases of Islamic or "Hudud" offences under Sharia law such as adultery, sexual offences (including homosexual activity), sodomy, prostitution, blasphemy and apostasy. Kidnapping, violent robbery, drug trafficking, banditry, destruction of property leading to death, certain military offenses (e.g. cowardice, desertion), perjury causing wrongful execution, espionage and treason carry a possible death sentence as well. Under the Houthi regime in northern Yemen, there has been an upsurge in death sentences meted out for sexual offences such as sodomy. In February 2024, thirteen men were sentenced to death for sodomy and in March 2024 a further nine men were sentenced to death. In May 2024, a Houthi-led court sentenced 44 people to death accused of collaborating with the Saudi coalition.

== Methods ==
Shooting is the only form of execution currently known to be used in Yemen. Stoning, hanging, and beheading are also permitted within the Yemeni penal code; however, stoning is not known to have been carried out for centuries.

The standard procedure for execution is to lie the defendant face-down on the ground or on a rug or blanket. Afterwards, a single executioner armed with an automatic rifle carries out the sentence by firing multiple rounds into the condemned person's back while attempting to strike the heart (often destroying the spinal vertebrae), the heart is pinpointed beforehand by a medical professional. In some cases where the defendant is found guilty of an additional Hudud offence, he or she may also be sentenced to flogging prior to the application of the death sentence. Both private and public executions are permitted in Yemen, with large crowds gathering in the event of the latter.

== Criticism ==
The last official execution of a minor in Yemen occurred on 21 July 1993, when 13-year-old Naseer Munir Nasser al-Kirbi and three men were hanged in the capital Sana'a on charges of murder and highway robbery. Following this, the Yemeni House of Representatives amended its penal code the following year by prohibiting death sentences for persons under the age of 18 at the time of the offence. However, the majority of Yemenis are not issued birth certificates (with a civil birth registration rate of 22.6% in 2006, according to the World Health Organization), and the Yemeni legal system is severely limited in its ability to adequately ascertain the age of defendants. There are several reports that juvenile offenders continue to be executed in Yemen. One particularly notable case is that of Ibb native Muhammed Taher Thabet Samoum, who was charged with a murder committed in June 1999 and subsequently sentenced to death in September 2001. His sentence was confirmed by the Supreme Judicial Council and ratified by former President Ali Abdullah Saleh. Samoum is alleged to have been 13 at the time of the offense, and the case of his imminent execution was given particular emphasis in a February 2011 European Parliament resolution regarding the human rights situation in Yemen.

In addition to the execution of juvenile offenders, human rights organizations have expressed concern that death sentences are passed after unfair trials. Authorities have at times allegedly extracted confessions through duress, using methods such as severe beatings, prolonged suspension, threats of rape, incommunicado detention and inadequate access to food and water.

== Number of executions per year ==
Year	Number of executions
2023	13+
2022	4+
2021	14+
2020	5+
2019	7+
2018	4+
2017	2+
2016	Unknown
2015	8+
2014	22+
2013	13+
2012	28+
2011	41+
2010	53+
2009	30+
2008	13+
2007	15+
2006	30+
2005	24+
2004	6+
2003	30+
2002	10+
2001	56+
2000	13+
1999	35
1998	17+
1997	5+
1996	1+
1995	41+
1994	25+
1993	30+

== See also ==
- Crime in Yemen
