= SBY =

SBY is an abbreviation that can stand for:

== Places ==
- IATA code for Salisbury-Ocean City Wicomico Regional Airport, Maryland, US
- Surabaya, East Java, Indonesia
- Selby railway station, North Yorkshire, England, National Rail station code
- Shibuya Station, JR East station code

== Other uses ==
- Susilo Bambang Yudhoyono, the 6th President of Indonesia
- Standby mode of electronic device, alternative name of Sleep mode
- Space Battleship Yamato, a Japanese anime franchise
- Soldiers' Brigade of Yemen, a Yemeni Islamist militant group
