= Nasser al-Bahri =

Yemeni al-Qaeda member

- Born: 29 April,1972; Saudi Arabia
- Died: December 26, 2015 (aged 42–43); Al Mukalla, Yemen
- Children: 4
- Military career
- Allegiance: Bosnian mujahideen (1993–1996) Islamic Courts Union (1996); Al-Qaeda (1996–2000): Al-Qaeda Central (1996–2000)
- Rank: Bodyguard of Bin Laden
- Conflicts: Bosnian War Somali Civil War Afghan Civil War (1996–2001)

Nasser Ahmed Nasser Abdullah al-Bahri ( 29 April 1972 – 26 December 2015), also known by his kunya or nom de guerre as Abu Jandal – "father of death" or "the killer", was a member of al-Qaeda in Afghanistan from 1996 to 2000. According to his memoir, he pledged allegiance to Osama bin Laden in 1998. He was in al-Qaeda for six years as one of bin Laden's twelve bodyguards, A citizen of Yemen born in Saudi Arabia, al-Bahri was radicalized in his teens by dissident Saudi ulamas and participated in clandestine political activities which were funded in part by human trafficking. Determined to become a jihadist, he first went to Bosnia and then, briefly, to Somalia before arriving in Afghanistan in 1996 in the hope of joining al-Qaeda, which he soon did. After four years, al-Bahri became "disillusioned", largely because bin Laden consolidated al-Qaeda's relationship with the Taliban by giving his bayʿah to its leader, Mullah Omar, but also because he had married and become a father.

After his return to Yemen in 2000, he was taken into custody by the authorities and held for two years without trial. He agreed to abide by the parole conditions of a Yemeni jihadist rehabilitation program directed by judge Hamoud al-Hitar. In them he had to accept more education about Islam, as well as discuss his new and old ideas about jihad with the judge and younger students.

During a September 2009 interview with reporter Michelle Shephard of the Toronto Star, al-Bahri said that he was no longer a member of al-Qaeda, but that he supported the organization for some of its beliefs.

He claimed to have recruited Salim Ahmed Hamdan to al-Qaeda, where the latter became a driver for bin Laden. The two men married sisters. Captured in Afghanistan in 2001, Hamdan was the first detainee tried under the United States' tribunals; his military defense attorney took his case to the US Supreme Court in Hamdan v. Rumsfeld (2006) to challenge their constitutionality. Al-Bahri and Hamdan were the subjects of the documentary, The Oath (2010), by American director Laura Poitras, which explored their time in al-Qaeda and afterward.

== Early life ==
Al-Bahri was born in 29 April, 1972 in Saudi Arabia to Yemeni parents. He was radicalized in his teens and became involved in clandestine political activities, "seeking reform and in support of dissident clerics". He became interested in jihad while watching TV accounts of foreigners who traveled to Afghanistan to fight with the resistance during the Soviet occupation during the 1980s.

In 1993, he joined the mujahideen in the Bosnian War (1992–95), then spent a short time in Somalia where he hoped to join the armed wing of the Islamic Courts Union (ICU) in their fight to take power. He was unhappy with "their amateurism" and "love of money" and left for Afghanistan where he hoped to join al-Qaeda.

He went to Afghanistan in 1996 and entered the "Star of Jihad" complex near Kandahar, which had become al-Qaeda's headquarters after their flight from Sudan. He underwent rigorous training and became a trainer himself before bin Laden singled him out to become his personal bodyguard, giving him a special revolver and two bullets which al-Bahri was to kill him with if ever he was surrounded by "the enemy". Al-Bahri is alleged to have met Mohamed Atta and others of the 9-11 hijackers while in Afghanistan. He had taken the kunya Abu Jandal (Abu literally translates to "father", and "Jandal" roughly to "killing, stabbing to the ground" thus the kunya roughly translates to "father of killing").

After a falling out with other members, largely due to ideological reasons – al-Bahri opposed bin Laden's decision to form a close alliance with the Taliban – but also because he had become a father, al-Bahri and his Yemeni wife returned to Yemen in December 2000. Bahri went back to al-Qaeda's Afghan headquarters one more time and stayed for one month. On his return to Sanaa, Yemen, he was arrested by security forces in February 2001 at the request of the United States. Al-Bahri has said he was held without trial for nearly two years, 13 months of which in solitary confinement. He learned about 9/11 in his prison cell in Sanaa. Under the direction of a Yemeni judge, Hamoud al-Hitar, al-Bahri agreed to participate in the Yemeni jihadist rehabilitation program, through which captured jihadists took education and challenged their philosophy, while working with students. Al-Bahri was finally released in 2002 after a few months in the program. He said it was not very effective.

== Post-release ==
Following his release, al-Bahri studied business administration and subsequently worked as a taxi driver. He then worked as a business consultant.

== Marriage and family ==
Al-Bahri married his Yemeni bride, Tayssir, in 1999 and they have four children. On bin Laden's instruction, al-Bahri and Salim Ahmed Hamdan married sisters. Hamdan returned to Yemen in November 2008, having been imprisoned by the United States in the Guantanamo Bay detention camp and being convicted on a charge in 2008. Captured in Afghanistan and detained by the United States, Hamdan was the first detainee tried under the military tribunals and took his case to the United States Supreme Court in Hamdan v. Rumsfeld (2006). After appealing his conviction, Hamdan was acquitted in October 2012 by the United States Court of Appeals for the District of Columbia Circuit.

== Other activities ==
Al-Bahri wrote a memoir with the help of Georges Malbrunot about his experiences, which they published in French as Dans l'ombre de Ben Laden: révélations de son garde du corps repenti ("In the Shadow of Bin Laden: Revelations of His Repentant Bodyguard") (2010). In 2013, an English translation of the book, by Susan de Muth, was published in London under the title Guarding bin Laden: My Life in Al-Qaeda.

Al-Bahri has said he opposes attacks that injure or kill civilians. While talking to the Toronto Star in 2009, he said he had supported al Qaeda's 9/11 attacks on the World Trade Center in New York City, as a means to make Americans aware of their nation's activities abroad. In April 2010, al-Bahri said that he regretted not having killed bin Laden when he had a chance, as so many civilians died because of the al-Qaeda leader.

He is described as "disengaged" from the war with the West, although he stated admiration for some of al-Qaeda's ideals.

== Death ==
Al-Bahri died of an undisclosed illness in Mukalla on 26 December 2015.

== In popular culture ==
Abu Jandal is played by Zaki Youssef in The Looming Tower miniseries.

== Books ==
- Nasser al-Bahri, Dans l'ombre de Ben Laden : révélations de son garde du corps repenti (avec la collaboration de Georges Malbrunot), éditions Michel Lafon, Neuilly-sur-Seine, 2010, 293 pages., ISBN 978-2-7499-1197-7.
  - Nasser al-Bahri with Georges Malbrunot translated by Susan de Muth, Guarding Bin Laden: My life in al-Qaeda, Thin Man Press, 2013, 238 pages, ISBN 978-0-9562473-6-0.
