= United States–Yemen relations =

- United States: Yemen

In the years after the September 11, 2001 attack on the World Trade Center in New York City, Yemen became a key site for U.S. intelligence gathering and drone attacks on Al-Qaeda. According to the 2012 U.S. Global Leadership Report, 18% of Yemenis approved of U.S. leadership, with 59% disapproving and 23% uncertain. According to a February 2015 report from the Congressional Research Service, U.S. officials considered Al-Qaeda in the Arab Peninsula the Al-Qaeda affiliate "most likely to attempt transnational attacks against the United States."

Yemen is a top country for humanitarian aid from the United States with US$4 billion provided since 2014.

== Historical relations ==
=== 20th century ===
United States–Yemen relations
- United States: Yemen Arab Republic

The United States established diplomatic relations with the Imamate in 1947. A resident legation, later elevated to embassy status, was opened in Taiz (the capital at the time) on March 16, 1959, and moved to Sana'a in 1966. The United States was one of the first countries to recognize the Yemen Arab Republic, doing so on December 19, 1962. A major US Agency for International Development (USAID) program constructed the Mocha-Taiz-Sana'a highway and the Kennedy memorial water project in Taiz, as well as many smaller projects. On June 6, 1967, the YAR, under Egyptian influence, broke diplomatic relations with the United States in the wake of the Arab-Israeli conflict of that year. Secretary of State William P. Rogers restored relations following a visit to Sana'a in July 1972, and a new USAID agreement was concluded in 1973.

On December 7, 1967, the United States recognized the People's Democratic Republic of Yemen and elevated its Consulate General in Aden to embassy status. However, relations were strained. The PDRY was placed on the list of nations that support terrorism. On October 24, 1969, south Yemen formally broke diplomatic relations with the United States. The United States and the PDRY reestablished diplomatic relations on April 30, 1990, only 3 weeks before the announcement of unification. However, the embassy in Aden, which closed in 1969, was never reopened, and the PDRY as a political entity no longer exists.

During a 1979 border conflict between the Yemen Arab Republic and the People's Democratic Republic of Yemen, the United States cooperated with Saudi Arabia to greatly expand the security assistance program to the YAR by providing F-5 aircraft, tanks, vehicles and training. George H. W. Bush, while Vice President, visited in April 1986, and President Ali Abdullah Saleh visited the United States in January 1990. The United States had a $42 million USAID program in 1990. From 1973 to 1990, the United States provided the YAR with assistance in the agriculture, education, and health and water sectors. Many Yemenis were sent on US government scholarships to study in the region and in the United States. There was a Peace Corps program with about 50 volunteers. The US Information Service operated an English-language institute in Sana'a.

The United States cancelled its economic aid to Yemen following Yemen's "No" vote on United Nations Security Council Resolution 678, the 1990 authorization for the Gulf War. United States diplomats informed Yemeni officials, "That was the most expensive no vote you ever cast."

=== 21st century ===
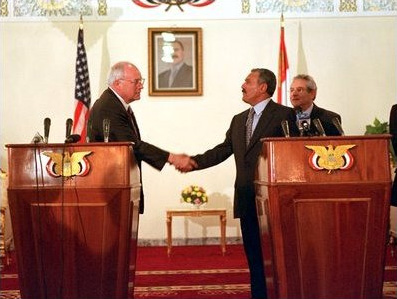
Vice President Dick Cheney and President Ali Abdullah Saleh discuss joint efforts to fight terrorist activity at a press conference in Sana'a, Yemen, 14 March 2002

In November 2001, two months after Al-Qaeda's terrorist attacks on the United States, Yemen's then-President Saleh visited Washington, D.C., and Yemen subsequently increased its counter-terrorism cooperation efforts with the United States. President Saleh returned to Washington, D.C., in June 2004 when he was invited to attend the G8 Sea Island Summit and agreed to participate in future activities detailed in the Sea Island charter. In November 2005 and May 2007, President Saleh again visited high-level officials in Washington, D.C., including President George W. Bush and Secretary of State Condoleezza Rice.

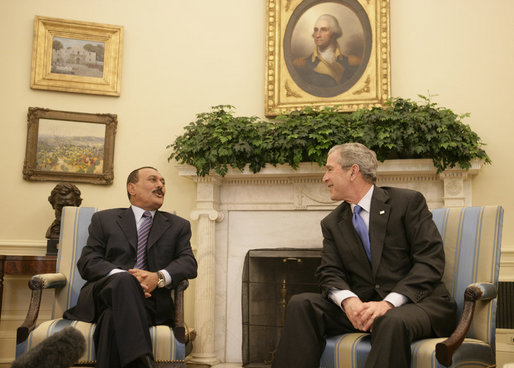
Saleh with George W. Bush in 2007

The U.S. Agency for International Development program in Yemen had ended in September 2000, but it was reinvigorated in 2003 and a USAID office reopened in Sana'a. Yemen also received significant funding from the Middle East Partnership Initiative. Funds primarily supported literacy projects, election monitoring, training for civil society, and the improvement of electoral procedures. In 2006, the U.S. Department of Agriculture provided 30,000 metric tons of soybean meal that were sold for approximately $7.5 million to finance programs in support of Yemen's agricultural sector.

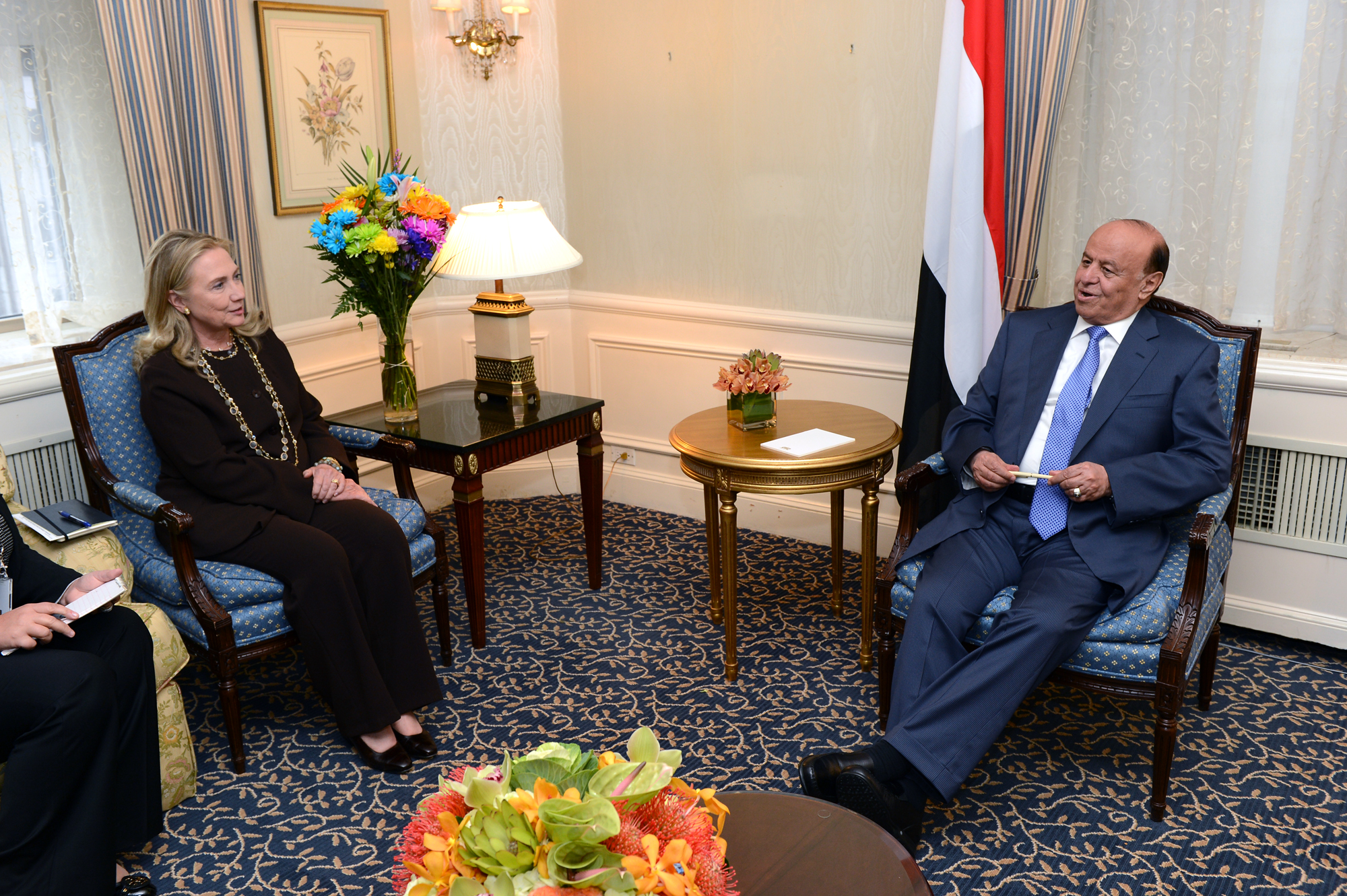
Secretary Clinton Meets With Yemeni President Hadi in 2012

Defense relations between Yemen and the United States improved rapidly, with the resumption of International Military Education and Training assistance and the transfer of military equipment and spare parts. In the fiscal year 2006, U.S. Foreign Military Financing (FMF) for Yemen was $8.42 million, International Military Education and Training (IMET) was $924,000, and Non-Proliferation, Anti-Terrorism, Demining and Related Programs (NADR) was $1.4 million. In FY 2006 Yemen also received $7.9 million in Economic Support Funds (ESF), $10 million in Food for Progress (Title 1) assistance, and $5 million in funding for counter-terrorism support.

On July 29, 2011, responding to violent protests in Yemen, the World Bank suspended the disbursement of funds that had been promised by international donors at a conference in 2006. Under a Gulf Cooperation Council plan supported by the U.S., then-President Saleh agreed to a transition plan, and a new president, Abdo Rabbo Mansour Hadi, was elected February 2012. In May 2012, President Obama issued an executive order giving the Treasury Department authority to freeze the U.S.-based assets of anyone who "obstructs" implementation of the administration-backed political transition in Yemen.

== Political relations ==
=== US support for Saudi-operations in Yemen ===
During the presidency of Barack Obama, the United States began providing Saudi Arabia with critical support to "sustain" the Saudi Arabian–led intervention in the Yemeni Civil War, launched at the request of the Yemeni government, later expanded during the presidency of Donald Trump. This support included logistical and intelligence aid. Trump vetoed a bipartisan bill in 2019 aimed at stopping U.S. support for the Saudi-led coalition in Yemen. In 2021, Joe Biden vowed to halt U.S. support for the war, though U.S. arms sales to the coalition have continued.

From 2015 to 2019, Saudi Arabia was reportedly the largest importer of U.S. arms.

=== Yemenis in Guantanamo Bay ===
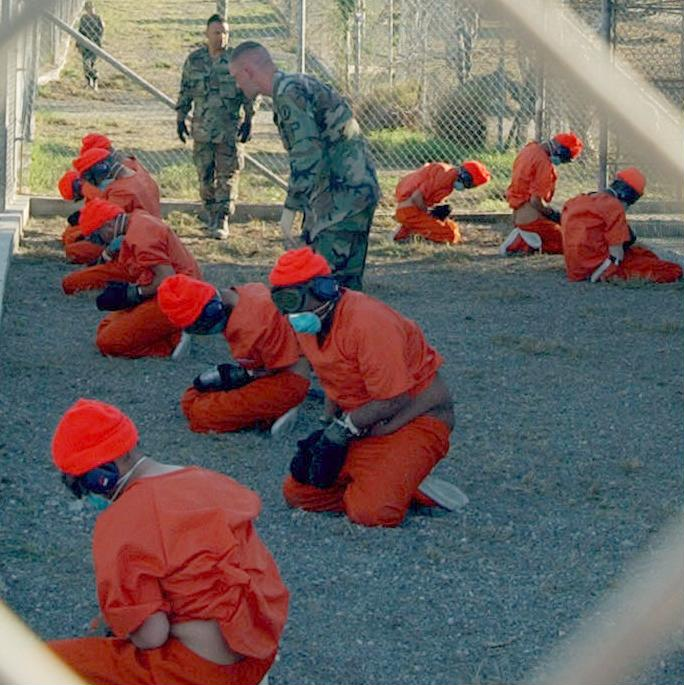
Detainees upon arrival at Camp X-Ray, Guantanamo Bay detention camp, 2002

As of November 2008, 101 Yemeni prisoners were still being held at the U.S. military prison in Guantanamo Bay, Cuba. Among this group, four men have been charged; two have been convicted in military commissions and two are charged with war crimes for participation in the September 11, 2001, terrorist attacks. According to one report, "The remaining 97 are an eclectic group of intentional unrepentant combatants and accidental warriors.... Yet separating the detainees into two groups and determining where different individuals fall on a spectrum of past and potential violence is a nearly impossible task." In December, Salim Hamdan, who was convicted in August of aiding Al Qaeda and sentenced to five and one-half years in prison, was released and handed over to the Yemeni authorities. He was returned to Yemen and subsequently released after serving the remainder of his sentence. Among those held at Guantanamo who have not been charged are the brother of the deputy commander of Al Qaeda in Yemen. What to do with the remaining Yemeni prisoners is a subject of debate within the United States government. The Yemeni government has often not kept known terrorists incarcerated, as President Saleh has instead opted to negotiate with hardened militants in order to use them against more lethal Jihadists or to secure pacts of non-belligerence from Al Qaeda affiliates.

On January 22, 2009, President Obama signed a series of executive orders to close the U.S. detention facility at Guantanamo Bay, Cuba. With Yemenis composing nearly 40% of the remaining prison population, U.S. policymakers will now be tasked with reviewing their individual cases. According to initial reports, "listed options include repatriation to their home nations or a willing third country, civil trials in this country, or a special civil or military system."

The Yemeni government pressed U.S. officials to fund a rehabilitation program for prisoners, similar to a Saudi Arabian government program that uses clerics and social support networks to de-radicalize and monitor prisoners. Between 2002 and 2005, Yemeni Religious Affairs Minister and Supreme Court Justice Hamoud al-Hittar ran an unsuccessful "dialogue" program with Yemeni Islamists in which he attempted to convince prisoners that Jihad in Islam is for defense, not for offensive attacks. More than 360 militants were released after going through the program, but there was almost no post-release support, such as helping the detainees find jobs and wives, key elements of the Saudi initiative. Several graduates of the program returned to violence, including three of the seven men identified as participants in the September bombing of the U.S. Embassy in Yemen. Other observers have suggested funding a Supermax-type prison in Yemen, though costs are uncertain, and there is little U.S. faith in the Yemeni authorities’ ability to maintain security.

== Military relations ==
=== Houthi conflict (2015–present) ===
In early 2015, after months of civil conflict, Houthi rebels took control of the northern part of Yemen, the besieged President Hadi resigned, and the government collapsed. The U.S. embassy closed in February 2015, and its personnel was evacuated. In March 2015, a U.S.-backed, Saudi-led coalition joined forces with Yemen's government to fight the rebels. The conflict was ongoing as of 2021. In 2021, the Houthis took 25 hostages, including USAID workers, and occupied the embassy buildings.

==== 2025 U.S. airstrikes under Trump administration ====
In 2025, President Donald Trump initiated significant military strikes on Houthis, marking the largest U.S. operation in the region since he took office. These strikes targeted military sites and infrastructure, killing at least 31 people, including women and children. The U.S. vowed to continue its operations until the Houthis ceased attacks on shipping, a core national interest of the U.S. The Houthis, in turn, threatened to escalate attacks, including targeting Israeli ships in the Red Sea. These developments have raised tensions, with Iran warning the U.S. against further escalation.

According to the Houthis' Health Ministry, the strikes had killed over 120 people by April 14, 2025. U.S. Central Command did not publicly acknowledge individual strikes, though the White House confirmed the overall number of operations. On April 8, suspected U.S. airstrikes around the Houthi-held capital, Sanaa, reportedly killed at least seven people and wounded 29. The Houthis claimed that a ceramics factory in the Bani Matar district was among the targets. Additional strikes were reported in Hodeida, al-Jawf, and Marib governorates. Concurrently, the Houthis announced the downing of a fourth U.S. MQ-9 Reaper drone in two weeks, allegedly shot down over Hajjah governorate with a locally produced missile. The U.S. military acknowledged reports of the drone's loss but did not confirm further details.

The 2025 airstrike campaign marked a shift from previous U.S. policy, moving beyond targeting missile launch sites to include broader strategic strikes on urban areas and personnel. Defense Secretary Pete Hegseth linked the strikes to a wider effort to counter Iranian influence and curb its nuclear ambitions, asserting that Iran was observing the U.S. response in Yemen as a potential warning.

=== Intelligence cooperation and dispute over Yemen's counterterrorism policies ===
In the immediate aftermath of the USS Cole bombing in 2000, U.S. officials complained that Yemeni authorities were not cooperative in the investigation. After the terrorist attacks of September 11, 2001, the Yemeni government became more forthcoming in its cooperation with the U.S. campaign to suppress Al Qaeda. President Saleh reportedly has allowed small groups of U.S. Special Forces troops and CIA agents to assist in identifying and rooting out Al Qaeda cadres hiding in Yemen, despite sympathy for Al Qaeda among many Yemenis. According to press articles quoting U.S. and Yemeni officials, the Yemeni government allowed U.S. personnel to launch a missile strike from an unmanned aircraft against an automobile in eastern Yemen in November 2002, killing six alleged terrorists, including Qaid Salim Sinan al Harithi, the leader of Al Qaeda in Yemen and a key planner of the attack on the USS Cole. Yemen then arrested al Harithi's replacement, Muhammad Hamdi al Ahdal, a year later. The United States also has helped Yemen build and equip a modern coast guard used to patrol the strategic Bab al Mandab strait where the Red Sea meets the Gulf of Aden and the Indian Ocean.

Finally, the United States has provided technical assistance, equipment, and training to the Anti-Terrorism Unit [ATU] of the Yemeni Central Security forces and other Yemeni Interior Ministry departments.

Despite recent U.S.-Yemeni security cooperation, many U.S. officials view Yemen's counterterrorism policies as inadequate. According to the U.S. State Department's 2007 Country Reports on Terrorism, "Despite Yemen’s history of terrorist activity and repeated offers of assistance from the U.S. government, Yemen lacked a comprehensive counterterrorism law. Current law as applied to counterterrorism was weak."

In the spring of 2008, FBI Director Robert Mueller traveled to Yemen to discuss counter-terrorism issues with President Saleh, including an update on the status of Jamal al Badawi and other known Al Qaeda operatives. According to a Newsweek report, "The meeting between Mueller and Yemeni President Ali Abdullah Saleh did not go well," according to two sources who were briefed on the session but asked not to be identified discussing it. Saleh gave no clear answers about the suspect, Jamal al Badawi, leaving Mueller "angry and very frustrated," said one source, who added that he's "rarely seen the normally taciturn FBI director so upset."

Yemen continues to harbor a number of Al Qaeda operatives and has refused to extradite several known militants on the FBI's list of most wanted terrorists. (Article 44 of the constitution states that a Yemeni national may not be extradited to a foreign authority.) Three known Al Qaeda operatives (Jamal al Badawi, Fahd al Quso, and Jaber A. Elbaneh), sought under the FBI's Rewards for Justice program, are in Yemen. Before his incarceration, Elbaneh was free in Sana'a despite his conviction for his involvement in the 2002 attack French tanker Limburg and other attacks against Yemeni oil installations. In 2003, U.S. prosecutors charged Elbaneh in absentia with conspiring to provide material support to a foreign terrorist organization.

In the Wikileaks 2016 Yemen Files, published in November 2016, correspondence between the Yemeni Ministry of Defense and the US Army revealed that Yemen procured $218,000,000 worth of military aircraft through U.S. Security Assistance Funding.

== Economic relations ==
=== Foreign aid ===
Over the past several fiscal years, Yemen has received on average between $20 and $25 million annually in total U.S. foreign aid. For FY2009, the Administration has requested $28.2 million in assistance for Yemen, an increase from its $20.7 million aid package in FY2008. Between FY2006 and FY2007, Yemen also received approximately $31.5 million from the U.S. Department of Defense's Section 1206 account. Section 1206 Authority is a Department of Defense account designed to provide equipment, supplies, or training to foreign national military forces engaged in counter-terrorist operations. The primary recipients of the 1206 support are the Yemeni Special Operations Forces [YSOF], the Yemeni Army 11th Brigade, and the Yemeni Ministry of Defense's primary logistics support command known as the Central Repair Base.

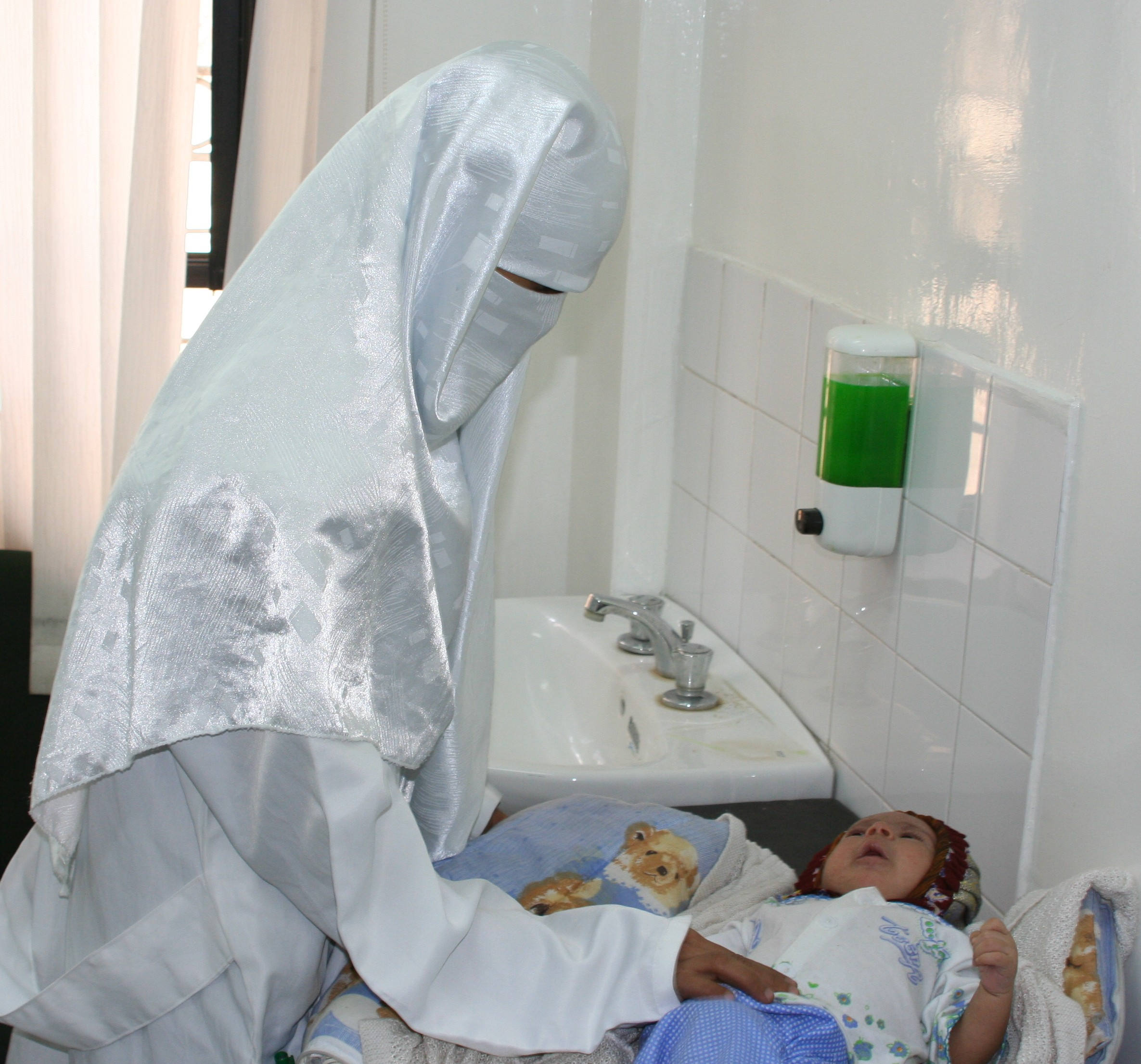
A Yemeni doctor examines an infant in a USAID-sponsored health care clinic.

U.S. economic aid to Yemen also supports democracy and governance programming. For almost five years, the National Democratic Institute (NDI) has run programs in Yemen's outlying provinces to support conflict resolution strategies designed to end revenge killings among tribes.

In November 2005, the Millennium Challenge Corporation (MCC) suspended Yemen's eligibility for assistance under its threshold program, concluding that, after Yemen was named as a potential aid candidate in FY2004, corruption in the country had increased. Yemen became eligible to reapply in November 2006 and had its eligibility reinstated in February 2007, nearly six months after it held what some observers described as a relatively successful presidential election.

U.S. training and other military assistance to Yemen, which totaled $176 million in 2010, dropped to $30 million in 2011 after then-President Ali Abdullah Saleh authorized armed action against anti-government political demonstrators.

Yemen's threshold program was approved on September 12, 2007. However, after reports of Jamal al Badawi's release from prison surfaced a month later, the MCC canceled a ceremony to inaugurate the $20.6 million threshold grant, stating that the agency is "reviewing its relationship with Yemen." Since then, there have been no reports on the status of MCC assistance to Yemen.

In April 2024, U.S. Special Envoy for Yemen, Tim Lenderking, traveled to Saudi Arabia and Oman to engage with partners on the imperative for an immediate cessation of Houthi assaults in the Red Sea and Gulf of Aden, which are undermining progress on the Yemen peace process and the delivery of humanitarian assistance to Yemen and other countries in need.

== Diplomatic missions and ambassadors ==
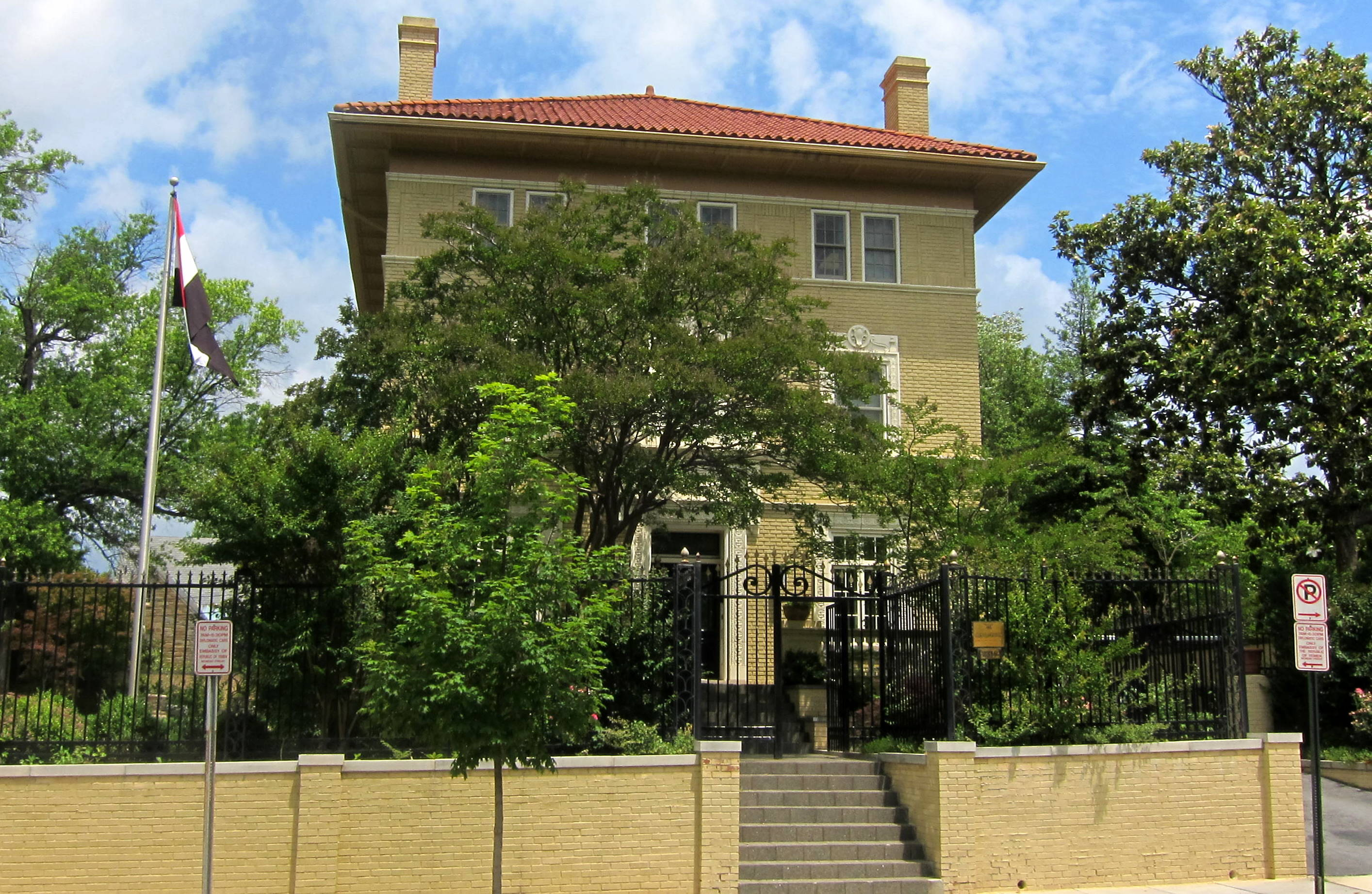
Embassy of Yemen in Washington, D.C.

The U.S. embassy in Sana'a is currently closed. There is a Yemeni embassy in Washington, D.C. The current U.S. ambassador to Yemen is Christopher Henzel, resident in Riyadh.

=== Attack on the American Embassy in Sana'a ===
On September 17, 2008, a bombing of the American embassy in Sana'a, the capital of Yemen, left 10 Yemeni civilians and police dead.

=== Closure of American Embassy in 2010 ===
In late December 2009, the embassy asked Americans in Yemen to keep watch of any suspicious terrorist activity following a terrorist incident on board a flight to the U.S. that was linked to Yemen. On 3 January 2010, concerned about information suggesting terrorist threats might be imminent, the embassy in Sana'a closed for two days.

=== Closure of American Embassy in 2015 ===
On February 10, 2015, the US announced temporary closure of its embassy in Yemen and evacuation of diplomats because of the continuing crisis in Yemen. U.S. diplomats accredited to Yemen are currently residing in Riyadh, Saudi Arabia.

== Gallery ==
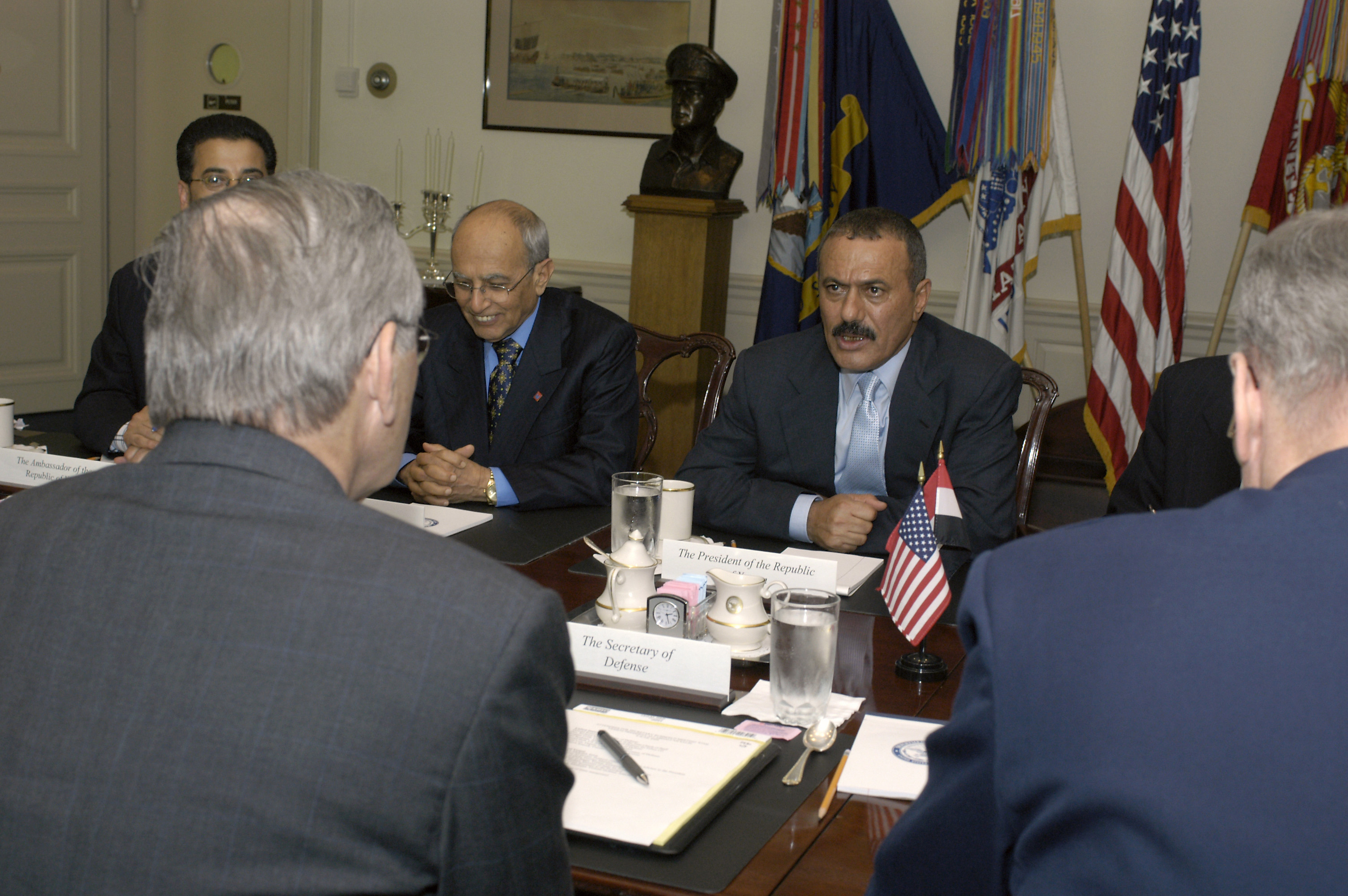
Saleh at The Pentagon, 8 June 2004

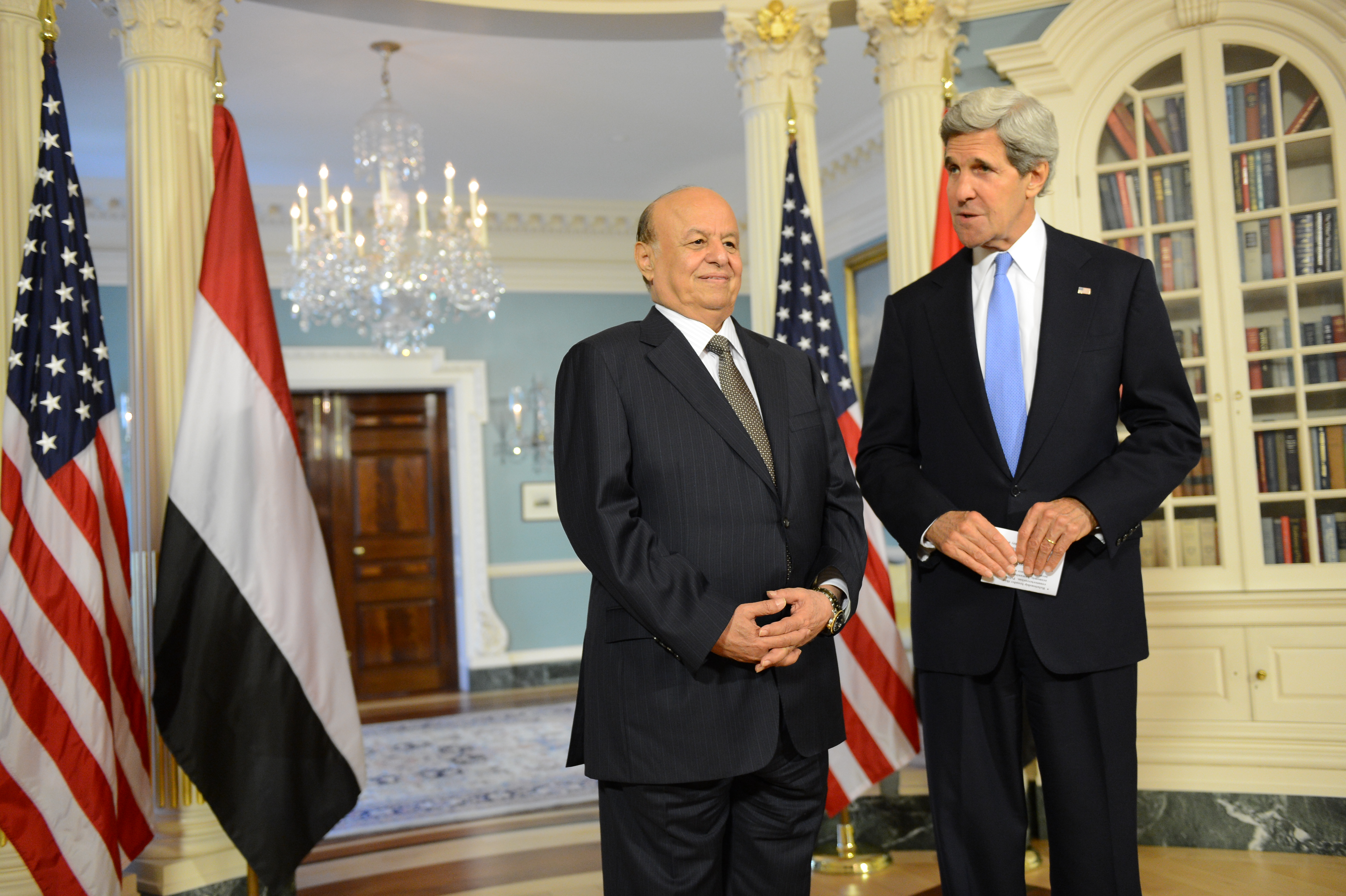
Yemeni President Abdo Rabbo Mansour Hadi with U.S. Secretary of State John Kerry, 29 July 2013

== See also ==
- 2023 American–Middle East conflict
- Foreign relations of the United States
- Foreign relations of Yemen
- Yemeni Americans
