= Law of Yemen =

Legal system in Yemen

The Law of Yemen incorporates Shari'a law, customary tribal laws, and Napoleonic influence. Yemen’s legal influence is a reflection of the significant historical influences and ongoing political developments within the country. Yemen does have a written constitution and legal structures that deal with various legal fields like criminal, constitutional, and personal status law. Yemen's legal history has been characterized by overlapping political entities with their own constitutional, religious, and customary foundations. This led to a legal framework categorized by pluralism and decentralization.

== Historical Background ==
Various states have existed within Yemen, including the Ottoman Yemen, the Kingdom of Yemen, South Yemen, and the Republic of Yemen. Through these various states, the practice of Zaydi Law, Houthi Law, and Shari'a law were practiced.

=== Ottoman Empire and Yemen ===
During the 19th century, the Ottoman Empire regained control after being expelled by Zaydi rule. This resurgence introduced the region to Hanafi Islamic law and legal codes such as the Mecelle. Ottoman courts ran in urban areas like Sana’a, while tribal and customary law prevailed in the highlands with strong Zaydi influence. The differing schools of Islam within Yemen had made Ottoman rule very limited, especially in the highlands. Resistance to Ottoman rule could be seen through conflicting legal norms and government structure. The Tanzimant reforms were limited to cities due to tribal leaders and local imam's extensive legal authority. The movement of these populations and the changeability of the legal system made it hard for Yemen to govern under Ottoman rule. The Ottoman Empire had left Yemen in 1918 following the defeat in World War I .

=== Kingdom of Yemen ===
The collapse of the Ottoman Empire led to the emergence of the Kingdom of Yemen with a heavy emphasis on Zaydi religious law. The legal process within the Kingdom was localized with no codified statutes. The imam was the political and legal authority within the Kingdom. The practice of Zaydism in the North reflects the emphasis on social justice and political implications. In Zaydism, Muslims must get rid of unjust leaders whether it is the Caliph or Sultan.

Due largely to their contrasting ruling histories, before the unification of North and South Yemen, the two nations had drastically different legal systems. North Yemen has largely maintained a legal system derived from religious teachings throughout its history. From centuries of rule under the Zaydi Imamate and lasting even still after the collapse of the monarchy in 1962 leading into the Yemen Arab Republic (YAR), North Yemen maintained a fairly strict adherence to Islamic law. Also known as Sharia law, they followed the teachings of Muhammad from the Quran. In some places where political power was weaker like more isolated or rural areas, local tribal leaders were often the face of the judicial system. This shared power can still be seen in Yemen today where a council of tribal elders will resolve disputes in areas the official legal system has a difficult time reaching.

=== South Yemen ===
The Kingdom of Yemen was in the north, and in the south, the land was a British protectorate under the name of “Aden Protectorate”. This protectorate state of the south had led to many revolts sponsored by the imam in the north to get rid of British control. British expansion into this area of Yemen was designed to secure ports and link to British India. Within this protectorship, Resident Advisors were stationed and as a result, they influenced and controlled various domestic affairs. By 1945 the British colonial empire was declining and the Suez crisis had transitioned the protectorate state and much of the Middle East towards Arab nationalist ideals. By November 1967 British troops were forced out by guerilla warfare attacks organized by both the National Liberation Front (NLF) and the Front for the Liberation of Occupied South Yemen (FLOSY).

Unlike in North Yemen, the Southern nation has undergone drastic changes in its legal system over its history. Before becoming the People’s Democratic Republic of Yemen (PDRY) in 1970, South Yemen also mainly adhered to Islamic law, although they maintained some British influence as well due to their occupation of the nation for such a prolonged period. However, this religious state would not last forever. As the National Liberation Front took power following the British exodus, they began to shy further and further away from the Sharia law they were accustomed to. As a more Marxist faction of the NLF became more powerful, they created the Yemen Socialist Party (YSP), the sole political party of the People’s Democratic Republic of Yemen. From there the nation became largely secular with the YSP becoming the sole governor of law in the state. This essentially disposed entirely of the use of religion in the legal sector, even in low-profile status cases in which Sharia law was still maintained was eventually phased out.

=== Yemen Arab Republic ===
The 1962 revolution replaced the Zaydi imam with the Yemen Arab Republic. The republic would maintain preexisting legal structures such as Zaydi personal status law and tribal adjudication. The Republic wanted to codify laws to follow secular Arab models such as Egypt. Legal codes for criminal, civil, and commercial areas were introduced but not evenly integrated into laws. In the countryside courts still relied on Zaydi texts and tribal compromises. During this period there were debates about non-Muslim minorities and whether their rights should work in the same framework of Islamic law. This tension revealed Yemen’s attempt to keep traditional jurisprudence while also looking into modern legal concepts. As a result, the Republic adopts new civil, criminal, and family codes with references to Sharia law.

=== The People's Democratic Republic of Yemen ===
In the south of Yemen, The People’s Democratic Republic of Yemen followed a socialist legal model. Upon independence from British colonial rule in 1967, the People's Democratic Republic of Yemen sought to secularize the legal system, abolish religious courts, and institute more socialist legal codes. The legal courts became secular and centralized and the use of Islamic and tribal laws was discouraged. The government established a central judiciary and sought to regulate family law through legislation rather than Islamic jurisprudence. The South was entering a period of reform that included land redistribution and expansion of women's rights, though the enforcement of these reforms varied throughout the southern region.

=== Republic of Yemen ===
The reunification of the North and South led to the integration of two distinct legal structures. In 1990, this reunification would have a constitution that declared Shari’a law to be the source of all legislation. The legal system was mixed. In this legal system, major reform went underway in an attempt to harmonize both Northern and Southern legal codes. However, reform efforts were limited especially in family law codification due to religious opposition and political instability. The courts operated under different norms, whether it was Zaydi principles in the North or socialist habits in the South.

Unification was first agreed upon by both North and South heads of state in 1972, but it took quite some time to actually get there. Tensions arose after failure to come to agreeable terms leading to small-scale conflicts. These conflicts continued even after further agreements to unify at a summit meeting in Kuwait in 1979, with the PDRY supporting attacks against the YAR shortly after. Quite some time and thousands of casualties later, the two governments came to less hostile terms in 1988, agreeing to joint ventures along their borders and granting citizens free passage between the two nations. A constitution that was originally drafted in 1981 was accepted by the respective heads of state in 1989 and the two nations merged into the Republic of Yemen in 1990. This, however, was not the end of the conflict in Yemen. A division arose among Yemen leadership, specifically between President Saleh and Vice President al-Beidh who acted with foreign leaders behind the president's back claiming violence against the Yemen Socialist Party originating from the north along with unfair economic restraints on the south. Tensions strained further, despite attempts to amend the constitution, until civil war broke out in May 1994. Attacks from both sides fueled the Southern nation to succeed and declare itself the Democratic Republic of Yemen (DRY) led by al-Beidh, whose political structure was surprisingly similar to unified Yemen. The DRY army was eventually defeated and major reforms to the 1990 constitution were approved by the Yemeni legislature. In September 1994 the reforms were adopted with the new constitution reverting back to Sharia being the ultimate law of the land for the basis of all legislation and a market economy was adopted. The current judiciary system is carried out from three main sources, the Ministry of Justice, the Supreme Court, and the Prosecutor General. While, as mentioned, Sharia is the main source of the law, certain civil laws and tribal customs are still maintained, mainly in the more rural areas of the state as it’s been in the past, displaying a deep underlying fidelity to the long history of Yemen.

== Legal Structures ==
=== Zaydi Islamic Law ===
In the northern Yemen highlands, Zaydi Islam had shaped the legal system. Zaydi law practice emphasizes the usage of textual legal documents with legal opinions (fatwas) and contracts. Textualism was key to the Yemeni legal system; judges wrote legal documents that enforced the administrative and religious authority of the state without a strong bureaucratic infrastructure. Within the Zaydi legal structure, the topic of religious minorities would be brought up in response to past Ottoman rule reforms. These reforms conflicted with traditional Zaydi legal interpretations.

=== Houthi Islamic Law ===
The Houthi movement is a Zaydi Shia Islamist movement organization that rose during the 90s in Yemen. Houthi courts have issued rulings involving capital punishment for political dissenters, seized properties from perceived enemies, and censored journalists and NGOs. Legal advocacy groups have documented irregularities in trial procedures, such as denial of legal counsel, and the use of coerced confessions. The Houthi movement is rooted in various subsects such as religion and domestic concerns.

== Modern Era ==
Since the Civil War in 2015, Yemen’s legal system has fragmented into various jurisdictions that hold their structure, ideological foundation, and enforcement capacity. This conflict has only deepened preexisting legal pluralism. There has been an unfolding of parallel legal orders in Houthi-controlled Northern Yemen areas. In the Houthi legal system, classical jurisprudence is seen in areas of personal status, inheritance, and morality. Yemen’s modern-day legal system cannot be understood as a ranking ordered by the state. The system is legitimized through local recognition rather than formal authority.

== Major areas of Law ==
=== Criminal Law ===
Yemeni criminal law is rooted in Islamic Shari’a law with influence from tribal customs. Pre-2015 the criminal justice system blended Zaydi jurisprudence and Shari’a with modern reforms. The state’s prosecutorial role (Niyaba) was influenced by the French model and was crucial to representing the state's interest in criminal cases. Since the 2015 civil war, Yemen's legal system has fractured, with the Houthi movement establishing a criminal justice system based on their interpretation of Zaydi law. In Houthi-controlled areas, the niyaba has been restructured to serve political and ideological goals, with harsh punishments for political dissent, apostasy, and blasphemy.

Defendants are presumed innocent until proven guilty; indigent defendants in felony cases are by law entitled to counsel, but in practice this does not always occur. Trials, which are generally public, are conducted without juries; judges adjudicate criminal cases. All defendants have the right of appeal.

=== Constitutional Law ===
Yemen's constitution is based on a combination of sharia, old Egyptian laws, and Napoleonic tradition.

=== Judiciary ===
Although Yemen's constitution provides for an autonomous judiciary and independent judges, in reality the judiciary is managed by an executive-branch council, the Supreme Judicial Council (SJC), and judges are appointed and can be removed by the executive branch. The judicial system itself is considered weak; corruption is widespread; the government is often reluctant to enforce judgments; and judges are subject to harassment from tribal leaders, who themselves exercise significant discretion in the interpretation and application of the law. There have been several restructurings of the judiciary since the government initiated a judicial reform program in 1997, but none have resulted in any significant improvements in the functioning of the system or produced evidence of having reduced corruption.

The highest court in Yemen is the Supreme Court of the Republic.

=== Personal Status Law ===
Women often suffer discrimination, particularly in domestic matters.
