= Mohammed al-Basha =

Yemeni American analyst

- محمد الباشا
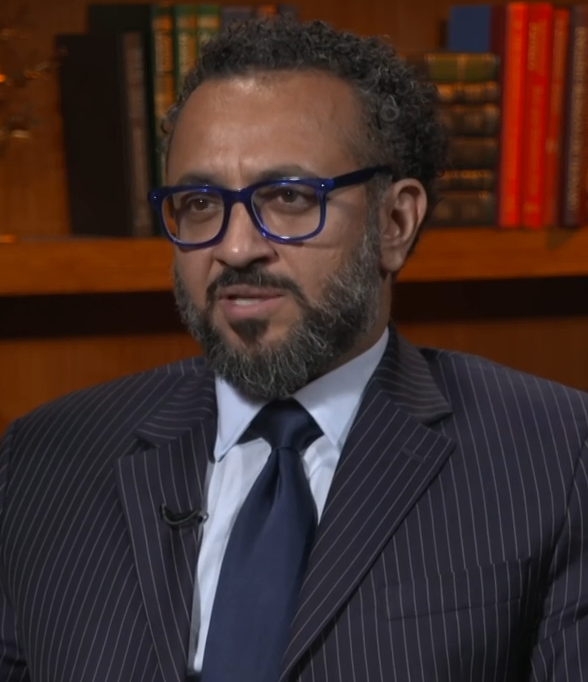
- Basha in an interview with Voice of America Persian News Network in 2024
- Occupation: Analyst
- Website: bashareport.substack.com

Mohammed al-Basha (Note: Arabic: محمد الباشا) is a Yemeni American analyst. He served as the spokesperson for the embassy of Yemen in Washington, D.C., from at least 2005 until 2015, whereupon he joined the Navanti Group as a researcher. He later left the group in 2024 and founded Basha Report, a risk advisory firm. He is considered a prominent analyst on matters concerning Yemen, being featured by many prominent news organizations and institutions.

== Career ==
A Yemeni American fluent in English and Arabic, Albasha is an alumnus of the Near East South Asia Center for Strategic Studies at the National Defense University, the Schar School of Policy and Government at George Mason University, where he received a master's degree, and Johns Hopkins University, where he received a graduate certificate in international relations. He has also attended seminars in peacebuilding and conflict resolution at the School for Conflict Analysis and Resolution at George Mason University and the Center for International Development and Conflict Management at the University of Maryland, College Park.

Prior to his work as an analyst, Basha served as a spokesperson for the Yemeni embassy in Washington, D.C., from at least 2005 until 2015. He was also a former journalist, serving as a correspondent for Saba News Agency and the director of the Washington, D.C.-based Yemen Press Center.

By 2016 he had joined the Navanti Group, a research group based in Virginia. He served as Communications and Client Engagement Manager and the Yemen subject-matter expert for the organization, managing research on "food security, risk analysis, media monitoring, and emerging threats in the Arabian Peninsula." He remained a part of the organization until 2024, when he founded Basha Report, an independent, Washington-based risk consultancy firm. The group focuses on policy regarding the Middle East and North Africa, particularly Yemen.

The Sana’a Center for Strategic Studies regarded Basha as a prominent analyst focusing on Yemen. According to The Century Foundation, Basha "specializes in the analysis and visualization of complex security, military, and geopolitical environments." He has been sought for comments and interviews by major news outlets including the Associated Press, Agence France-Presse, Reuters, CNN, BBC News, Fox News, CBS News, NBC News, and ABC News, and newspapers such as Newsweek, the Los Angeles Times, The New York Times, the Chicago Tribune, Foreign Policy, The Washington Times, The Washington Post, The Guardian, The Daily Telegraph, and The Wall Street Journal. He has also given presentations at institutes such as Chatham House, the Marine Corps University, the Wilson Center, the Carnegie Endowment for International Peace, the International Institute for Strategic Studies, New America, and the National Defense University, among others.
