= Haddah =

Haddah حدة
- Village
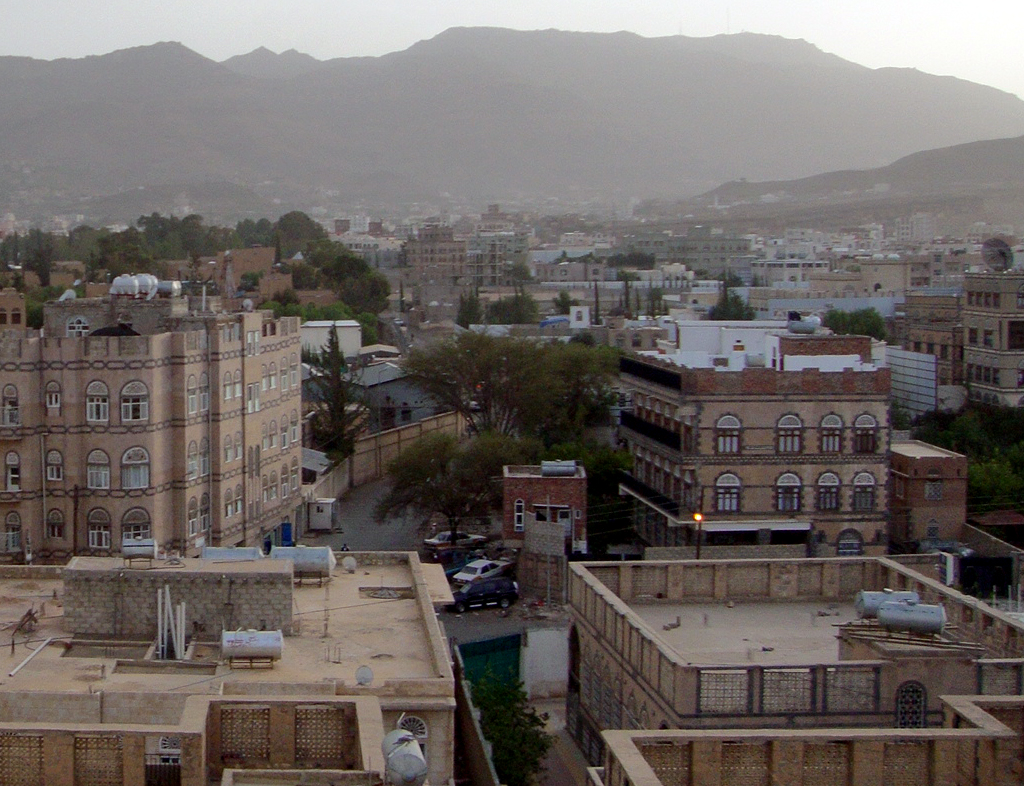

- Location in Yemen
- Coordinates: 15.29294°N 44.16362°E
- Country: Yemen
- Governorate: Sanaa
- District: Sanhan
- Elevation: 7,933 ft (2,418 m)
- Time zone: UTC+3 (Yemen Standard Time)

Haddah (Arabic: حدة Ḥaddah) is an affluent suburb of Sanaa, Yemen, located about 8 km southwest of central Sanaa in Sanhan District of Sanaa Governorate. It has been described as "the Beverly Hills of Sanaa" — a first-world enclave in a third-world city, with its avenues lined by palatial mansions belonging to the country's rich and powerful. Its buildings mostly tend to emulate the architecture of Saudi Arabia and the Gulf states.

== History ==
Since the time of al-Hadi ila'l-Haqq Yahya, the first Imam of Yemen, Haddah was often used as a base of operations against Sanaa. It was also frequently attacked from Sanaa. An early mention in the Ghayat al-amani of Yahya ibn al-Husayn records that Haddah was the site of a minor battle in November or December of 901 CE (Dhu'l-Hijjah, 288 AH). The battle was won by forces loyal to Imam al-Hadi. The following year, al-Hadi sent a force, led by his son Abu'l-Qasim Muhammad and his own brother Abdullah, to Haddah and nearby Sana' (not the same as Sanaa). They were attacked, but they were victorious and their attackers were routed. Historical texts mention that Haddah's trees were cut down as punishment on multiple occasions. One was in 1273 or 1274 CE (672 AH), when the Rasulid sultan al-Muzaffar Yusuf I razed Haddah and Sana' and cut down their trees. Haddah still had many trees through the mid-20th century, and was described in 1962 by Husayn ibn Ali al-Waysi as a favored picnic spot for Sana'nis, but most of the trees were cut down in the 1980s as Haddah was built up into a suburb of Sanaa.
