= 2009 United States federal budget =

2009 Budget of the United States federal government
- Submitted: February 4, 2008
- Submitted by: George W. Bush
- Submitted to: 110th United States Congress
- Country: United States
- Total revenue: $2.7 trillion (estimated) $2.105 trillion (actual); 14.6% of GDP (actual)
- Total expenditures: $3.107 trillion (estimated) $3.518 trillion (actual); 24.4% of GDP (actual)
- Deficit: $407 billion (requested) $1.413 trillion (actual); 9.8% of GDP (actual)
- Debt: $11.876 trillion (at fiscal end); 82.4% of GDP
- GDP: $14.415 trillion
- Website: Office of Management and Budget

The United States federal budget for fiscal year 2009 began as a spending request submitted by President George W. Bush to the 110th Congress. The final resolution written and submitted by the 110th Congress to be forwarded to the President was approved by the House on June 5, 2008.

The government was initially funded through three temporary continuing resolutions. Final funding for the Department of Defense, Department of Homeland Security, and Department of Veterans Affairs was enacted on September 30, 2008 as part of the Consolidated Security, Disaster Assistance, and Continuing Appropriations Act, 2009, while the remaining departments and agencies were funded as part of an omnibus spending bill, the Omnibus Appropriations Act, 2009, on March 10, 2009.

== Total receipts ==
2009 Actual Receipts by Source
1. Individual income tax (43.8%)
2. Social Security/other payroll tax (41.1%)
3. Corporate income tax (7.50%)
4. Excise tax (3.20%)
5. Deposits of earnings and Federal Reserve System (1.30%)
6. Estate and gift taxes (1.30%)
7. Customs duties (1.10%)
8. Other miscellaneous receipts (0.70%)

(in billions of dollars)

Source	Requested	Enacted	Actual
Individual income tax	1,259	958	915
Corporate income tax	339	165	138
Social Security and other payroll tax	949	898	891
Excise tax	69	71	62
Estate and gift taxes	26	28	23
Customs duties	29	24	22
Deposits of earnings and Federal Reserve System	-	28	34
Other miscellaneous receipts	28	16	18
Total	2,700	2,186	2,105

== Total spending ==
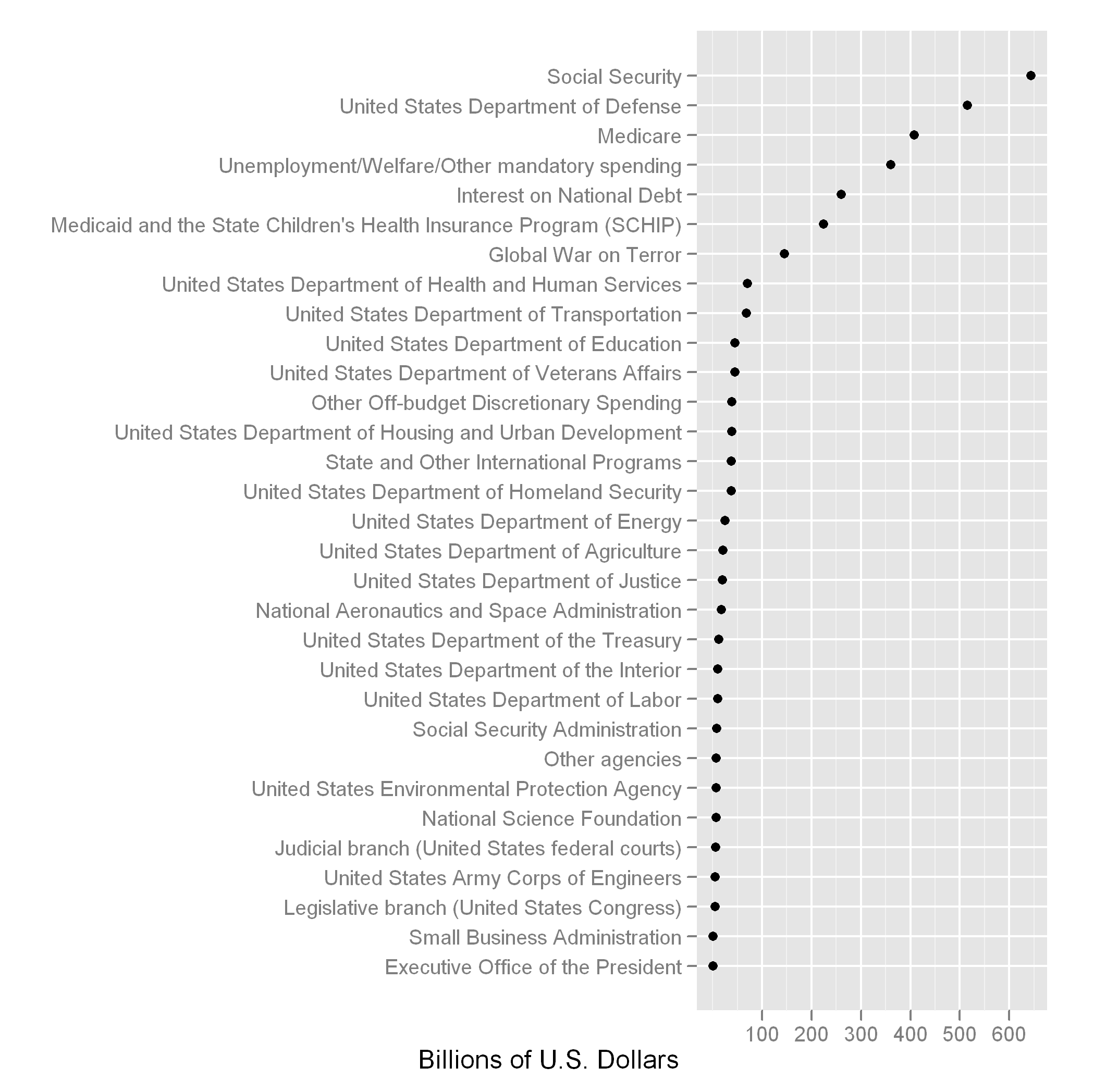
A dot plot representing spending by category for the US budget for 2009

The 110th Congress' budget for 2009 totaled $3.1 trillion. Percentages in parentheses indicate percentage change compared to 2008. This budget request is broken down by the following expenditures:

- Mandatory spending: $1.89 trillion (+6.2%)
  - $644 billion – Social Security
  - $408 billion – Medicare
  - $224 billion – Medicaid and the State Children's Health Insurance Program (SCHIP)
  - $360 billion – Unemployment/Welfare/Other mandatory spending
  - $260 billion – Interest on National Debt
- Discretionary spending: $1.21 trillion (+8.6%)
  - $515.4 billion – United States Department of Defense
  - $145.2 billion (2008*) – Global War on Terror
  - $70.4 billion – United States Department of Health and Human Services
  - $68.2 billion – United States Department of Transportation
  - $45.4 billion – United States Department of Education
  - $44.8 billion – United States Department of Veterans Affairs
  - $38.5 billion – United States Department of Housing and Urban Development
  - $38.3 billion – State and Other International Programs
  - $37.6 billion – United States Department of Homeland Security
  - $25.0 billion – United States Department of Energy
  - $20.8 billion – United States Department of Agriculture
  - $20.3 billion – United States Department of Justice
  - $17.6 billion – National Aeronautics and Space Administration
  - $12.5 billion – United States Department of the Treasury
  - $10.6 billion – United States Department of the Interior
  - $10.5 billion – United States Department of Labor
  - $8.4 billion – Social Security Administration
  - $7.1 billion – United States Environmental Protection Agency
  - $6.9 billion – National Science Foundation
  - $6.3 billion – Judicial branch (United States federal courts)
  - $4.7 billion – Legislative branch (United States Congress)
  - $4.7 billion – United States Army Corps of Engineers
  - $0.4 billion – Executive Office of the President
  - $0.7 billion – Small Business Administration
  - $7.2 billion – Other agencies
  - $39.0 billion (2008*) – Other Off-budget Discretionary Spending

The financial cost of the Iraq War and the War in Afghanistan are not part of the defense budget; they were appropriations.

== Deficit ==
Decreased tax revenue and high spending resulted in an unusually large budget deficit of about $1.4 trillion, well above the $407 billion projected in the FY 2009 budget. A 2009 CBO report indicated that $245 billion, about half of the excess spending, was a result of the 2008 TARP bailouts. Spending increases and tax credits resulting from the American Recovery and Reinvestment Act of 2009 accounted for another $200 billion of the budget deficit.
