= Mareb Press =

Yemeni online daily newspaper

- Type: Online newspaper
- Founder: Muhammad al-Salihi
- Editor-in-chief: Ahmed Ayed; Muhammad al-Salihi
- Founded: January 2006
- Language: Arabic
- Country: Yemen
- Website: marebpress.net

Mareb Press (Note: Arabic: مأرب برس) is a Yemeni online newspaper. Founded in 2006, it is a leading media outlet in Yemen, launching a printed version in 2012. Access to its website has been restricted in Houthi-controlled Yemen since 2015. Noted for its reporting on Marib Governorate, the newspaper provides coverage on a variety of topics concerning Yemen, and has been noted as a leading independent media outlet in the country.

== Overview ==
The founder of Mareb Press, Mohammed al-Salihi, said noticed a negative perception of his native region of Marib among fellow students while studying computer science in the early 2000s. This motivated him to pursue journalism and launch a media outlet to promote Marib. Due to the difficulty of operating a print newspaper he settled on a digital format, launching the website Mareb City in early 2003 with financial backing from local officials. Initially focused on promoting tourism, Mareb City gradually shifted to a news website covering local politics as well as corruption, leading to the officials cutting their support and the website shutting down in late 2005.

After the shutdown, Salihi decided to pursue a news website independent of state influence. He was approached by a group of five journalists with whom he founded Mareb Press in January 2006. Just days after its establishment, Salihi acquired an interview with local tribesmen involved in the kidnapping of a group of Italian tourists which was picked up by international news agencies. Said agencies continued to source information and photographs from Mareb Press from thereon. Mareb Press was the first news outlet to publish photos of an attack in Marib in 2007, which were purchased by Reuters.

By 2008, Mareb Press was regarded as among the most popular Yemeni news websites. It covered the Yemeni revolution in support of the opposition against President Ali Abdullah Saleh. In the aftermath of the revolution, independent media organizations suppressed by the Saleh regime, including Mareb Press, were allowed greater freedom. Mareb Press launched a printed daily newspaper version in 2012 and moved its headquarters to Sanaa.

After the Houthis captured Sanaa and took over much of Yemen, they began cracking down on independent media. On 26 March 2015, just as the Saudi Arabia-led coalition launched its intervention in the Yemeni civil war, access to the Mareb Press website among other independent media outlets was blocked in Houthi-controlled Yemen by internet provider YemenNet, which the group had taken over. A report by Citizen Lab found that Mareb Press was also blocked in Iran, the main backers of the Houthis. It remains a major news outlet in Yemen.

== Organization ==
The six journalists who originally founded Mareb Press each covered a specific region of Yemen, ensuring nationwide news coverage. The core team is supplemented by journalists and contributors working for other publications. International correspondents also provide commentary on matters concerning Yemenis from their respective countries. The core staff "select and revise the content provided by freelance correspondents based all over the country. However, since these stringers are rarely professional journalists, they are slow to produce content which often requires heavy editing." As of 2023, its editor's-in-chief are Salihi and Ahmed Yahya Ayed.

As of 2008, Salihi said that Mareb Press received income from a variety sources including merchants, a tribal sheikh in Marib, and figures close to opposition parties. It also received significant income through licensing photographs.

A report by International Media Support mentions Mareb Press as among the "serious and influential news outlets with significant audiences" in Yemen. Gregory D. Johnsen, an analyst focused on Yemen, regarded Mareb Press as having "very good sources" for its coverage in Marib Governorate. A report by the RAND Corporation mentions Mareb Press as among the highest-quality independent sources in Yemen covering the Houthi insurgency.

== Content ==
Sections are dedicated to local, regional and international current affairs, the economy of Yemen, tourism and archaeology, books, science and knowledge, sports, crime and readers' letters among other topics. A Yemen Times writer praised Mareb Press for being one of few media outlets to cover everyday problems concerning Yemenis as opposed to strictly political news coverage. Select articles have comments section subject to moderation, which "fosters the exchange of ideas" according to Salihi.

Yasir Hameed of The BMJ Opinion described Mareb Press as "an independent news website formed by independent Yemeni journalists." Although Mareb Press describes itself as independent and politically neutral, some labeled it as aligned with the opposition during the Saleh regime, citing its coverage of local conflicts and government corruption. In the context of the civil war, the newspaper is considered to be supportive of the internationally recognized government and is critical of the Houthis.
