= Nayif Mohammed al-Qahtani =

Saudi Arabian militant and propagandist (1988–2010)

Nayif Mohammed Saeed al-Kurdi al-Qahtani
- نايف محمد سعيد الكودري القحطاني
- Qahtani in an undated photograph
- Born: 25 March 1988; Khamis Mushait, Saudi Arabia
- Died: 2010 (aged 21–22); Saudi Arabia or Yemen
- Cause of death: Disputed
- Military career
- Allegiance: Al-Qaeda in Yemen (2007–2009); Al-Qaeda in the Arabian Peninsula (2009–2010)
- Service years: 2007–2010
- Nickname: Abu Hammam
- Known for: Founding Sada al-Malahem and al-Malahem Media Foundation
- Conflicts: Al-Qaeda insurgency in Yemen

Nayif Mohammed Saeed al-Kurdi al-Qahtani, (Note: Arabic: نايف محمد سعيد الكودري القحطاني) (25 March 1988 – 2010) also known by the kunya Abu Hammam, (Note: Arabic: أبو حمام) was a Saudi Arabian jihadist militant and propagandist. He joined al-Qaeda in Yemen in 2007 and was implicated in several attacks linked to the group and its successor, al-Qaeda in the Arabian Peninsula (AQAP). He was noted for having founded the jihadist online magazine Sada al-Malahem (Note: Arabic: صدى الملاحم, lit. 'Echoes of Epics') in 2008, the former flagship journal of both groups, as well as the al-Malahem Media Foundation, (Note: Arabic: مؤسسة الملاحم الإعلامية, lit. 'Epics Foundation') the official media wing of AQAP. By the time of his death, Qahtani was considered an influential AQAP commander involved in activities in both Yemen and Saudi Arabia.

== Biography ==
=== Early life and militant activities ===
Qahtani was born in Khamis Mushait, Saudi Arabia, on 25 March 1988. He was the youngest of several siblings and was raised primarily by his eldest brother after the death of his father. His brother described him as timid and having "no leadership qualities". He graduated from high school in Saudi Arabia, but a difficult marriage resulted in him leaving his pregnant wife and travelling to Yemen in 2006. His son was named Mohammad.

Shortly after moving to Yemen, he joined the local al-Qaeda affiliate in early 2007 and attended a camp at the Abu Jabara Valley in Saada Governorate, where he received training in weapons, explosives, martial arts and propaganda. An al-Qaeda biography states that Qahtani was first involved in a suicide bombing which killed eight Spanish tourists in July 2007, calling it "a good start to his career." A security official said he assisted in sheltering the bomber in Marib before he carried out the attack. After the bombing, Qahtani was assigned to the media division of the group.

Documents linked to Qahtani were found in a raid on a Soldiers' Brigades of Yemen safehouse on 11 August 2008. Saudi media reported afterwards based off information from Saudi militants detained in Yemen that he was an important member of the group involved in funding attacks, including the bombing of a police station in Seiyun on 25 July, and was based in the mountains adjacent to Abidah tribal territory along the Saudi Arabia–Yemen border. Reports of him receiving financial support from individuals in Libya and Iran were dismissed by one analyst as "a likely distortion by overzealous Yemeni officials". He also reportedly took part in organizing and funding the attack on the United States embassy in Sanaa on 17 September.

=== Sada al-Malahem and al-Malahem Media Foundation ===
Shortly after the Marib bombing, Qahtani directly met al-Qaeda in Yemen leader Nasir al-Wuhayshi and proposed to him the creation of an online magazine to bolster recruitment. Wuhayshi approved of the idea, and within the weeks the first issue of Sada al-Malahem was released on 13 January 2008. it contained several articles written by Qahtani focusing on international conflicts and politics as well as a two-part interview between him and the magazine's editors. The issue sought to portray Yemen as a legitimate theater of jihad, with Qahtani being at the forefront of this argument. He explained in the interview his rationale for moving to Yemen:

My choice was based on two reasons, the first and most important is a religious reason, as the Almighty said "Fight the unbelievers who are near to you, and let them find harshness in you," and to execute the commandment of the messenger of God, who said "expel the polytheists from the Arabian Peninsula" and to liberate al-Qibla of Muslims and the mosque of Mustafa and to cleanse the land of the peninsula... from the filth of the polytheists and apostates. The second reason is a military reason. If the interests of the enemy in the Arabian Peninsula were hit and the funding from oil was stopped and the oil refineries were destroyed, the enemy would collapse, and it would not only withdraw from Iraq and Afghanistan, but it would completely collapse. If it were to be hit from various locations, it would withdraw humiliated from the land of Muslims.

A message attributed to Qahtani titled "Come to Yemen" was featured in the second issue of Sada al-Malahem released in March 2008. Within it, Qahtani implored jihadists in Saudi Arabia to migrate to Yemen, claiming the Saudi affiliate had lost its battle and that jihad in Yemen would allow for the overthrow of the Saudi monarchy. He was also featured in the sixth issue of Sada al-Malahem released in November, in which he offered comparisons of the embassy attack in September to the 2003 Riyadh compound bombings, further advertising Yemen as a place for transnational jihad. He concluded "The sanctity of the Arabian Peninsula is one, its land is one, therefore Riyadh [is] Sanaa, and Sanaa is Riyadh."

As the official magazine of al-Qaeda in Yemen and later al-Qaeda in the Arabian Peninsula (AQAP), Sada al-Malahem in total had 11 issues, released bi-monthly from January 2008 up until November 2009. It may have been discontinued by that point due its intrinsic lack of accessibility to rural tribesmen and urban youth in Yemen, who were prioritized by AQAP for engagement. Rather than being a work of the larger AQAP organization, the magazine was likely ran almost single-handedly by Qahtani along with a few other friends, despite contributions from other members and leaders such as Wuhayshi.

Logo of al-Malahem Media Foundation, visible in media released by AQAP

Along with Sada al-Malahem, Qahtani also founded al-Malahem Media Foundation, the primary propaganda wing of al-Qaeda in Yemen. He had proposed his vision for the project to other group members in early 2008, describing a media outlet which would publish "everything from audio and video recordings to collections of poetry and jihadi anthems. The proposition was received positively by Wuhayshi. Al-Malahem Media was described as "the top jihadist media arm in the region" by the time that the Yemeni and Saudi branches of al-Qaeda merged to form AQAP in January 2009. Along with other works, al-Malahem Media carried the English language jihadist magazine Inspire and ran media featuring Anwar al-Awlaki.

=== Later activities ===
Some time after being assigned to the media department, Qahtani "decided to move to the military sphere" at an undisclosed time, and "trained a large number of the brethren, and set up camp with his fellow martyr Abu Khair Al Asiri." Thomas Hegghammer of Jihadica believed that by the time of AQAP's formation, Qahtani may have still been "too junior to represent the Saudi branch" as opposed to Said Ali al-Shihri or Mohammed al-Awfi, who were given top leadership roles. In February, a report on the Saudi government's 85 most-wanted militants listed Qahtani as sixth in order. It claimed he "planned assassinations, targeted oil facilities in Saudi, [is] linked to al-Qaeda in Yemen, [and] financed terrorist operations in Spain." He was later reported to have been involved in the attempted assassination of Saudi prince Muhammad bin Nayef in August.

On 12 May 2010, the US government designated Qahtani a terrorist and placed sanctions on him along with fellow AQAP commander Qasim al-Raymi. They had already been designated so by the United Nations by this time. A State Department press release claimed that Qahtani was involved in attacks in Yemen and Saudi Arabia, "some of which have targeted U.S. interests in the Arabian Peninsula", and was also an AQAP spokesperson. It profiled him as "a liaison between Al Qaeda cells in Yemen and Saudi Arabia" and an operational manager who channeled foreign funds for the group.

== Death ==
On 15 May 2010, The Guardian reported it was told by Yemeni journalist Abdulelah Haider Shaye that Qahtani had died in April during a gunfight with authorities in Saudi Arabia. He said an AQAP leader had confirmed Qahtani's death to him and that the group would announce it soon. A newsletter released by the group later in May did so, but withheld the date of his death and claimed he was killed in Abyan Governorate, Yemen, during joint US-Yemeni counterterrorism operations. Meanwhile, Fox News was told by US military officials that Qahtani died in an accidental explosion as he was handling a bomb. They said that he was being monitored by the US prior, but that his death did involve the US. Qahtani's family rejected reports of his death or his association with al-Qaeda.

Qahtani's death was described as the most significant suffered by AQAP since the attempted bombing of Northwest Airlines Flight 253 in December 2009. A US official said he was "a vibrant guy linked to ongoing operations planning, and his death will have an impact." Princeton University terrorism expert Gregory Johnsen characterized Qahtani as "a pioneering figure who helped turn Yemen's upstart group into a formidable terrorist network", but said his death likely wouldn't have a large impact as other leaders had surpassed him in importance by that point. He also noted that Qahtani could have already been dead by the time the US had sanctioned him. Shaye said the prospect "shows how few details the Americans have on AQAP: they sanction one of its leaders after he had been killed."
