= 2021 occupation of the United States embassy compound in Yemen =

The 2021 occupation of the United States embassy compound in Yemen was the breach of the former US Embassy compound in Sanaa by Iran-backed Houthi militants on 10 November 2021. Twenty five U.S. contractors were taken hostage; the U.S. government declined to confirm how many, but said it was "unceasing in our behind-the-scenes diplomatic efforts to secure their release."

The U.S. State Department requested that Houthi forces vacate the buildings and return all property. Following reports of the detention of Yemeni United States Agency for International Development and other U.S. workers, a State Department spokesman declared that the U.S. “is committed to ensuring the safety of those who serve the U.S. government overseas" Houthi militants are not a designated terrorist organization since February 2021.

== 2022 Blinken appeal ==
U.S. Department of State Secretary Antony Blinken on occasion of the first anniversary of the Houthis breaching the former embassy compound complained of the continued detainment "without justification" of the Yemeni employees of the embassy and appealed to the Houthis to release them as a demonstration of their commitment to peace.

== 2024 Kidnapping of more former embassy employees ==
The U.S. Mission to Yemen in 2024 decried the third anniversary of having its employees kidnapped. A few weeks later, the Houthis abducted another one.

== See also ==
- 2008 attack on the United States embassy in Yemen
