= Yigal Palmor =

Israeli government spokesman, diplomat

Yigal Palmor (Hebrew: יגאל פלמור) is the Head of the International Relations Unit and Foreign Policy Advisor to the Chairman at the Jewish Agency for Israel, where he had previously served for four years as Director of Public Affairs and Communications. He was the longest serving Spokesperson and Head of Press Bureau of the Ministry of Foreign Affairs in Israel from August 2008 to August 2014. Prior to this post, he served stints in Israel's embassies in Madrid (where he was a junior member of the Israeli delegation to the Madrid Conference of 1991) and in Paris, served as Deputy Director of the European Institutions department, and later as Director of the Maghreb, Syria and Lebanon department. He was a spokesperson of the Israeli delegations in a number of peace summits, including the Casablanca and Cairo Regional Economic Summits and the Annapolis Conference. In January 2009 he was dubbed "my favourite diplomat" by Australian minister (Labour) Barry Cohen. In February 2013, he was elected "Best Government Spokesperson" in a survey of Israeli journalists.

He made headlines when he called Brazil an "economic and cultural giant but a diplomatic dwarf" in July 2014, in response to Brazil being the only country at the time to recall its ambassador for consultations over Israel's military operation in Gaza, to shun attempts by President Shimon Peres to have a conversation with his Brazilian counterpart, and to push for condemnation at the UN. Rejected by the Brazilian President, his statement, however, encountered supportive follow-up in many of Brazil's leading media, who used it to criticize their own government's policy, while in Israel, it was Israeli president Reuven Rivlin's apology that came under severe criticism itself. When the Gaza war broke out in 2023, this quote was used again by Brazilian politicians and journalists to criticize their government's stance.

On 27 May 2014, it was reported that his retirement from the Ministry of Foreign Affairs was imminent, after a career spanning 28 years. Dubbed "a central pole of Israel's communications apparatus", his departure was seen as part of a wave of senior diplomatic resignations due to the weakening of the Foreign Ministry under Avigdor Lieberman. He left the Ministry in September 2014, and joined the Jewish Agency in November of that same year, where he worked closely with Agency's Chairman Natan Sharansky, and later with Chairman Isaac Herzog and Chairman Doron Almog.

He initiated, on behalf of the Jewish Agency, the Diasporas 2017 international conference, which convened Government ministers and officials from 29 countries around the world to discuss issues related to their national diasporas, the relations between diaspora and home country and cooperation between different national diasporas at home and abroad. In this groundbreaking event, participants presented their policies for contact with their diasporas, discussed how these policies are realized through a variety of initiatives, programs and partnerships, and explained the main challenges they face in developing these activities. This conference launched an ongoing cooperation between The Jewish Agency, the Greek Ministry of Foreign Affairs, and the Presidential Commissioner for Cypriots Abroad. A number of trialateral summits were held, a joint mission of Greek and Cypriot diaspora leaders was hosted in Jerusalem at the Jewish Agency's Board of Governors, and a trilateral young diaspora leaders mission visited Jerusalem, Athens and Nicosia.

He is the author of the "Diplomatic Cliché Collection" (הקלישאון הדיפלומטי), a compilation of conventional forms of speech in diplomatese and their real, ironic meaning. Or, as Haaretz described it: "A semi-humorous paper intended to translate the euphemisms uttered by leaders, foreign ministers, diplomats and government spokespeople when they are faced with difficult questions".

He has published articles in the international media on issues such as Israel's diplomacy, the Jewish Agency and antisemitism.

== See also ==
- Foreign relations of Israel
- Jewish Agency for Israel – Zionist non-profit organization
- Ministry of Foreign Affairs (Israel) – Government ministry of Israel
- List of Israeli ambassadors
