= Yemeni jihadist rehabilitation program =

In January 2009, the President of Yemen, Ali Abdullah Saleh, announced plans to start a new Yemeni jihadist rehabilitation program similar to the Saudi jihadist rehabilitation program. According to Michelle Shephard, reporting for the Toronto Star in September 2009, Yemen had been an innovator in jihadist rehabilitation, with an effort led by the judge Hamoud al-Hitar, called the "Committee for Religious Dialogue". Shephard wrote in September 2009 that she found no sign of the new program during a recent visit.

Shephard wrote that the earlier jihadist rehabilitation program had been shut down in 2005 due to a lack of funds and lack of interest. She interviewed al-Hitar and Nasser al-Bahri, one of the program's more well-known graduates. Al-Bahri and his brother-in-law, Salim Ahmed Hamdan, long held as detainees in the Guantanamo Bay detention camp, were featured in the film documentary The Oath (2010) by the American filmmaker Laura Poitras.

Al-Bahri said that his meetings with al-Hitar were "tainted" because they took place in prison, and were under police surveillance. Shephard wrote that, using the term used by those who study rehabilitation of jihadists, al-Bahri was not "deradicalized" but rather "disengaged".

The Economist magazine reported that Socotra, a distant off-shore Yemeni island, was being considered as a possible site for the rehabilitation program.
