= Supreme Court of the Republic (Yemen) =

Highest authority court of Yemen

The Supreme Court of the Republic is the highest court of law in the Republic of Yemen.

According to Article 153 of the Constitution of Yemen, it is the "highest judicial authority" in Yemen. It has the power to examine the constitutionality of laws, regulations, by-laws, and decisions; to judge disputes over conflict of jurisdiction; to investigate and give opinions regarding appeals referred by the House of Representatives relating to its membership; to hear appeals from lower courts; and to try the president, vice president, prime minister, his deputies, ministers, and their deputies.

In 2006, it was reported to have eight divisions: constitutional, appeals' scrutiny, criminal, military, civil, family, commercial, and administrative. the constitutional division was composed of seven judges including the chief justice.
