= Hamoud al-Hitar =

Yemeni judge

Hamoud Al-Hitar (born c. 1955) is a Yemeni judge. He served as minister of Minister of Religious Endowments and Guidance from 2008 to 2011. He is notable for leading a Yemeni jihadist rehabilitation program, called the "Committee for Religious Dialogue".

According to a Newsweek article, Al-Hitar was an admirer of Egyptian leader Gamal Abdul Nasser in his youth. He joined the Muslim Brotherhood in 1972, but left it in early 1980s after he became a judge.

Newsweek reported that when he adjudicated the case of the murder of two Yemeni Jews in 1984 he received death threats when he broke an unspoken tradition that judges not impose the death penalty for the killers of Jews.

The jihadist rehabilitation program he leads was in operation as early as 2000.

== Media appearances ==
In September 2009 Michelle Shephard, of the Toronto Star, interviewed al-Hitari who was currently minister of Religious Endowments. Al-Hitari acknowledged that his first deradicalization program consisted mostly of senior religious clerics engaging in "theological duels" with the jihadist prisoners. He claimed the program had been "98% successful".

Al-Hitari answered Shephard's questions about a report from the Countering Terrorism Center at West Point, that described his first anti-jihadist program as a failure. Al-Hitari was asked about the criticism in the West Point report that his rehabilitation program had focused merely on persuading the prisoners that Yemen should not be the target of jihad inspired violence, but it didn't spend enough energy curbing the prisoners desire to attack targets outside of Yemen. Al-Hitari responded by asking what efforts the USA had made to rehabilitate its Guantanamo captives.
