= FBI Seeking Information – Terrorism list =

List of suspected terrorists compiled by the United States FBI

The FBI Seeking Terror Information list is the third major "wanted" list to have been created by the United States Department of Justice's Federal Bureau of Investigation to be used as a primary tool for publicly identifying and tracking down suspected terrorists operating against United States nationals at home and abroad. The first preceding list for this purpose was the FBI Ten Most Wanted Fugitives list. In 2001, after the September 11 attacks, that list was supplanted by the FBI Most Wanted Terrorists list, for the purpose of listing fugitives who are specifically wanted for acts of terrorism.

Since inception in January 2002, the Seeking Information list also serves this purpose, but with the big difference from the two earlier lists being that the suspected terrorists on this third list need not be fugitives indicted by grand juries in the United States district courts. Such lower level guidelines now allow for a much quicker response time by the FBI to deliver the early known information, often very limited, out to the public as quickly as possible. As the name of this list implies, the FBI's intent is to acquire any critical information from the public, as soon as possible, about the suspected terrorists, in order to prevent any future attacks that may be in the current planning stages.

All three of the major wanted lists now appear on the FBI web site along with several other types of wanted lists as well. All such FBI lists are grouped together under the heading "Wanted by the FBI."

Current banner used by the FBI since 2003 as the main title for the web site pages.

== Precedents and early versions ==
The FBI Seeking Information – War on Terrorism list has roots in the two earlier fugitive tracking FBI lists. During the 1990s decade in particular, the FBI began using the Ten Most Wanted list to profile some major terrorists, including Ramzi Yousef and Osama bin Laden among others, such as the 1988 mass murder bombers of Pan Am Flight 103 over Lockerbie, Scotland.

In addition to these Justice Department fugitive programs, an even earlier method of terrorist tracking was created by the United States Department of State, in the Bureau of Diplomatic Security. This DoS effort is known as the "Rewards for Justice Program", which began in 1984, and originally paid monetary rewards of up to $5 million for information countering terrorism.

After 9/11, in 2001, the FBI Most Wanted Terrorists list was created, as a companion list to the extant FBI Ten Most Wanted Fugitives Program, and to the State Department's Rewards for Justice Program.

Original FBI banner from 2002, and still present as the header on archive pages of the list at fbi.gov as of 2006. The three overlapping seals on the left are the seal of the United States Department of State (similar to the Great Seal of the United States), the seal of the United States Department of Justice, and the seal of the Federal Bureau of Investigation.

=== Original list of 5 in videos from Atef rubble ===
After January 14, 2002, five individuals delivering what United States Attorney General John Ashcroft described as "martyrdom messages from suicide terrorists" were found on five discovered videos, recovered from the rubble of the home of Mohammad Atef outside of Kabul, Afghanistan. Abd Al Rahim, one of the individuals in the films, was detained by American forces in Guantanamo Bay for seven years and allegedly tortured, though his "martyrdom message" was in fact known to be a video documenting his torture by Al-Qaeda members who imprisoned him.

NBC News said that the five videos had been recorded after the Sept. 11 terrorist attacks in the United States. Of the five individuals originally listed, one has been detained by U.S. authorities, while another was detained and released, a third was killed in a drone strike, a fourth died as a suicide bomber and a fifth has not been brought into custody. None have been formally tried or convicted of any crimes in the United States.

In response, on January 17, 2002, the FBI released to the public the first Most Wanted Terrorists Seeking Information list (now known as the FBI Seeking Information – Terrorism list), in order to profile the five wanted terrorists about whom very little was known, but who were suspected of plotting additional terrorist attacks in martyrdom operations. The videos were shown by the FBI without sound, to guard against the possibility that the messages contained signals for other terrorists.

Ashcroft called upon people worldwide to help "identify, locate and incapacitate terrorists who are suspected of planning additional attacks against innocent civilians." "These men could be anywhere in the world," he said. Ashcroft added that an analysis of the audio suggested "the men may be trained and prepared to commit future suicide terrorist acts."

On that day, Ramzi bin al-Shibh was one of the only four known names among the five. Ashcroft said not much was known about any of them except bin al-Shibh. The fifth wanted terrorist was identified a week later as Abderraouf Jdey, alias: Al Rauf Bin Al Habib Bin Yousef Al-Jiddi.

The initial five terrorists on videos from the Atef rubble profiled on the list were:

Ramzi bin al-Shibh	U.S. prisoner September 14, 2002, at an undisclosed location; removed from FBI list by October 17, 2002; transferred to the Guantanamo Bay detention camp as of September 6, 2006.
Abd al-Rahim	Found to be a prisoner of the Taliban in January 2002, taken into U.S. custody and sent to Guantanamo Bay. Archived to FBI "Martyrdom Messages/video" page February 2, 2003. Released in 2009.
Muhammad Sa'id Ali Hasan	Archived to FBI "Martyrdom Messages/video" page February 2, 2003. Killed in a drone strike in Yemen in April 2012.
Khalid Ibn Muhammad Al-Juhani	Archived to FBI "Martyrdom Messages/video" page February 2, 2003. Died as a suicide bomber in the Riyadh compound bombings three months later.
Abderraouf Jdey	

=== Montreal plot ===
A week after the initial Afghanistan martyrdom videos were released, the FBI had identified the fifth name, al-Jiddi, or Jdey, a resident of Montreal, Quebec, Canada. An international manhunt was launched January 25, 2002, for his companion, a Canadian citizen named Faker Boussora, then 37. U.S. officials said the two Tunisian-born Canadians were part of a Canadian group plotting to kill more civilians.

Added to the list on January 25, 2002, was:

Faker Ben Abdelazziz Boussora

=== Yemen plot ===
In early 2002, according to an FBI report, as a result of US military operations in Afghanistan and of on-going interviews of detainees in Guantanamo Bay, Cuba, information became available on February 11, 2002 regarding threats to US interests which indicated that a planned attack may have been about to occur in the United States or against US interests in the country of Yemen on or around the next day, February 12, 2002.

On February 11, 2002, the FBI added an additional 17 terrorists to the list. But several days later, on February 14, 2002, six of the names were removed, and the FBI re-published the list as only eleven names and photos, because it was discovered that confusion over transliteration had failed to reveal initially that the removed six wanted terrorists were already in prison in Yemen. According to the FBI report, as a result of U.S. military operations in Afghanistan and on-going interviews of detainees in the Guantanamo Bay detention camp, information became available on February 11, 2002, regarding threats to U.S. interests, which indicated that a planned attack may have been about to occur in the United States or against U.S. interests in the country of Yemen on or around the next day, February 12, 2002.

The six names identified in the Yemen plot on February 11, 2002, but removed from the list on February 14, 2002, as already in Yemen custody were:

Issam Ahmad Dibwan al-Makhlafi	Removed from FBI wanted list February 14, 2002.
Ahmad al-Akhader Nasser Albidani	Removed from FBI wanted list February 14, 2002.
Bashir Ali Nasser al-Sharari	Removed from FBI wanted list February 14, 2002.
Abdulaziz Muhammad Saleh bin Otash	Removed from FBI wanted list February 14, 2002; killed in Somalia in 2011.
Shuhour Abdullah Mukbil al-Sabri	Removed from FBI wanted list February 14, 2002.
Riyadh Shikawi	Removed from FBI wanted list February 14, 2002.

The eleven names who were still being sought on February 14, 2002, in relation to the planned February 12, 2002, Yemen plot were:

Fawaz Yahya al-Rabeei	Leader of the Yemen cell; archived to FBI "February 2002, Seeking Information Alert" page February 2, 2003; Yemen prisoner in 2004, sentenced to death; escaped from Yemen prison in San'a February 3, 2006; killed on 1 October 2006.
Alyan Muhammad Ali al-Wa'eli	Archived to FBI "February 2002, Seeking Information Alert" page February 2, 2003.
Bassam Abdullah bin Bushar al-Nahdi	Archived to FBI "February 2002, Seeking Information Alert" page February 2, 2003.
Mustafa Abdulkader Aabed al-Ansari	Archived to FBI "February 2002, Seeking Information Alert" page February 2, 2003; killed in Saudi Arabia on May 1, 2004.
Omar Ahmad Omar al-Hubishi	Archived to FBI "February 2002, Seeking Information Alert" page February 2, 2003.
Ammar Abadah Nasser al-Wa'eli	Archived to FBI "February 2002, Seeking Information Alert" page February 2, 2003; killed in a drone strike in Yemen in June 2011.
Samir Abduh Sa'id al-Maktawi	Archived to FBI "February 2002, Seeking Information Alert" page February 2, 2003.
Abdulrab Muhammad Muhammad Ali al-Sayfi	Archived to FBI "February 2002, Seeking Information Alert" page February 2, 2003.
Abu Nasr al-Tunisi	No photo available.
Abu Mu'az al-Jeddawi	No photo available.
Amin Saad Muhammad al-Zumari	No photo available.

Three of those remaining eleven suspects (Tunisi, Jeddawi, and Zumari) did not have photos on the FBI website. Along with the earlier six suspects on the list, they brought the total count outstanding for the list to seventeen at that time.

The attack of February 12, 2002, never occurred, but a series of plots and attacks followed later that year in Yemen, including the suicide bombing of the Limburg, a French oil tanker, for which al-Rabeei and others were later convicted. As of 2006, all the individuals of the February 12, 2002, Yemen plot have since been removed from the FBI's current main wanted page and from the official count for the Seeking Information – War on Terrorism list.

=== Issam Ahmad Dibwan al-Makhlafi ===
Issam Ahmad Dibwan al-Makhlafi (born in 1977 in Saudi Arabia, identified as a Yemeni), aka Akrama, became briefly wanted in 2002, by the United States Department of Justice's FBI, which was then seeking information about his identity and whereabouts. In early 2002, he had been named in a suspected Yemen plot, for which he became listed on the FBI's third major "wanted" list, now known as the 'FBI Seeking Information - War on Terrorism list'. He was identified as a known associate of the Yemen cell leader, Fawaz Yahya al-Rabeei. But he was quickly discovered to already be in Yemen prison, and was promptly removed from the FBI "wanted" list. Very little else is known about him.

== Revisions and additions ==
By February 2, 2003, the FBI rearranged its entire wanted lists on its web site. The outstanding five martyr video suspects (including Jdey's Montreal associate Boussora) were moved to a separate linked page, titled "Martyrdom Messages/video, Seeking Information Alert" (Although both Jdey and Boussora were later returned to the main FBI list page). Additionally, the remaining eight Yemen plot suspects were archived to a linked page titled, "February 2002, Seeking Information Alert". Around this time the FBI also changed the name of the list, to the FBI "Seeking Information – War on Terrorism", to distinguish it from its other wanted list of "Seeking Information", which the FBI already uses for ordinary fugitives, those who are not terrorists.

Along with the re-arrangement, the FBI also continued to add new fugitive names to the list, including one member of The Portland Seven terror cell.

=== February 2003 alert ===
Amer el-Maati	
Habis Abdulla al Saoub	Killed in Pakistan in October 2003, removed from the list June 24, 2004.

=== April–June 2003 alerts ===
By June 2003, several new terrorist suspects were added:

Jaber A. Elbaneh	Moved to FBI Most Wanted Terrorists list February 23, 2006.
Jamal Ahmad Mohammad Al Badawi	Removed from FBI list October 10, 2004; escaped with 22 others from a Yemeni jail on February 3, 2006; moved to FBI Most Wanted Terrorists list February 23, 2006; killed in a drone strike in Yemen in January 2019.
Fahd al-Quso	Removed from FBI list October 10, 2004; escaped with 22 others from a Yemeni jail on February 3, 2006; moved to FBI Most Wanted Terrorists list February 23, 2006; killed in a drone strike in Yemen in May 2012.
Dr. Mohammed Khan	Located by June 2003, removed from list before 2006.
Aafia Siddiqui	Captured on July 17, 2008 in Afghanistan.
Adnan Gulshair el Shukrijumah	Moved to FBI Most Wanted Terrorists list in July 2010; killed in Pakistan in December 2014.

=== September 5, 2003, alerts ===
Two new additions to the list were introduced by September 5, 2003. In addition, Jdey was also moved on to the main list page, from the earlier archived 2002 group:

Zubayr Al-Rimi	Killed in Saudi Arabia in September 2003, removed from the list before 2006.
Karim El Mejjati	Killed in Saudi Arabia in April 2005, removed from the list before 2006.

=== Summer 2004 terror alert ===
On May 26, 2004, United States Attorney General John Ashcroft and FBI Director Robert Mueller announced that reports indicated that seven al-Qaeda members were planning a terrorist action for the summer or fall of 2004. The alleged terrorists listed on that date were Ahmed Khalfan Ghailani, Fazul Abdullah Mohammed, and Abderraouf Jdey, along with Amer El-Maati, Aafia Siddiqui, Adam Yahiye Gadahn, and Adnan G. el Shukrijumah. The first two had been listed as FBI Most Wanted Terrorists since 2001, indicted for their roles in the 1998 U.S. embassy bombings. Jdey was already on the FBI's "Seeking Information" wanted list since January 17, 2002, and el-Maati since February 2003, and Siddiqui and Shukrijumah also since early 2003. Gadahn was added as well to the Seeking Information list.

Adam Yahiye Gadahn	Moved to FBI Most Wanted Terrorists list October 11, 2006; killed in a drone strike in Pakistan in January 2015.

=== Escapees from Yemen prison ===
23 people, 12 of them al-Qaeda members, escaped from a Yemeni jail on February 3, 2006, according to a BBC report. On February 23, 2006, the U.S. FBI confirmed the escape, as they issued a national Press Release naming some of the escapees as new Most Wanted Terrorists, and also one of the escapees as a new addition to the Seeking Information list, Abdullah Al-Rimi. He is being sought for questioning relating to any knowledge he might have of the 2000 attack on the USS Cole.

With this one addition below, as of February 23, 2006, the total count on the outstanding Seeking Information list stood at eight.

Abdullah Al-Rimi

=== Al-Qaeda in Iraq, and Kenya and Indonesia attacks ===
The very next day, on February 24, 2006, the FBI added an additional three names to the Seeking Information – War on Terrorism list, most notably, Abu Musab al-Zarqawi, the notorious leader of Al-Qaeda in Iraq. This marked the first time that al-Zarqawi had appeared on any of the three major FBI wanted lists. On June 8, 2006, ABC News reported that Abu Musab al-Zarqawi was confirmed to have been killed in Baghdad in a bombing raid the day before by a United States task force. His death was confirmed by multiple sources in Iraq, including the United States government.

Saleh Nabhan was wanted for questioning for attacks in Kenya in 2002. Noordin Top was a member of the Jemaah Islamiyah group, which was involved in bombings in Indonesia between 2002 and 2004. With these three additions, as of February 24, 2006, the total count on the outstanding Seeking Information list stood at ten.

Abu Musab al-Zarqawi	Killed in Iraq on June 7, 2006; removed from list October 12, 2006.
Saleh Ali Saleh Nabhan	Killed in Somalia on Sept 14, 2009.
Noordin Mohammad Top	Killed in Indonesia on Sept 17, 2009.

=== December 10, 2008 alert ===
Mas Selamat bin Kastari	Captured in Malaysia on April 1, 2009.

=== April 23, 2011 alert ===
Sirajuddin Haqqani

=== November 14, 2012 alert ===
Shaykh Aminullah	Removed from list in February 2023.

=== January 29, 2015 alert ===
Ghazi Nasr al-Din	Removed from list in February 2019.

=== January 25, 2019 alert ===
Abdullah Shair Khan

=== February 28, 2019 alert ===
Hamza bin Laden	Killed in a United States counterterrorism operation in the Afghanistan/Pakistan region.

=== August 12, 2019 alert ===
Mohamed Ahmed Elsayed Ahmed Ibrahim	Removed from list in August 2019.

=== May 12, 2020 alert ===
Kidnappers of Caitlan Coleman	Some of the kidnappers were killed while others had fled. 4 of unidentified living ones were featured in this alert.

=== October 21, 2021 alert ===
Abd al-Rahman al-Maghrebi

=== June 27, 2023 alert ===
Issa Barrey

=== September 5, 2023 alert ===
Mu’min al-Mawji Mahmud Salim
Sarah Jamal Muhammad al-Sayyid

=== December 8, 2023 alert ===
Mohammad Mahdi Khanpour Ardestani
Majid Dastjani Farahani

=== January 29, 2024 alert ===
Reza Hamidi Ravari

=== September 12, 2024 alert ===
Hamza al-Ghamdi

=== February 4, 2025 alert ===
Mohammad Baseri	Killed in Iran on February 28, 2026.
Ahmad Khazai	

=== May 22, 2025 alert ===
Seyed Yahya Hosseiny Panjaki	Killed in Iran on February 28, 2026.

=== July 15, 2025 alert ===
Gholamhossein Mohammadnia
Taghi Daneshvar
Reza Amiri Moghadam

=== December 22, 2025 alert ===
Saeed Tavakoli

=== November 10, 2026 alert ===
Mohammad Reza Ansari
Abolfazl Alizadeh
Mohammad Hossein Shamoradizadeh
