= Abdullah Al-Rimi =

Al-Qaeda recruiter

- Born: 1974 (age 51–52); Taiz, North Yemen
- Military career
- Allegiance: Al-Qaeda: Al-Qaeda in Yemen (1990-2006)
- Service years: 1990–2006
- Rank: Al-Qaeda recruiter
- Conflicts: al-Qaeda insurgency in Yemen

Abdullah Al-Rimi (Arabic: عبد الله الريمي; born 1974) or Abdullah Ahmed Al-Remi, (born in Yemen), has been described as an "important al-Qaeda recruiter", and became wanted in 2006 by the United States Department of Justice's FBI, "sought in connection with possible terrorist threats against the United States." He was one of 23 people who escaped from Yemen prison in San'a, including the Yemen cell leader, Fawaz Yahya al-Rabeei. Several weeks later he became listed on the FBI's third major "wanted" list, the FBI Seeking Information – War on Terrorism list. Very little else is known about him.

Aliases listed by the FBI: Awaiss, Owaiss, Uwayss, Zubayr Al-Rimi (possible).

== USS Cole bombing ==
On 12 October 2000, one year prior to 9/11, Yemen became an early theater in the war on terrorism, when the USS Cole bombing killed 17 American sailors and wounded 40 off the port coast of Aden, Yemen. In the aftermath, the government of Yemen rounded up numerous suspected terrorists, many of whom were identified as members of al-Qaeda.

On 23 February 2006 the U.S. FBI confirmed the escape of prisoners from a Yemeni jail, and added escapee Abdullah Al-Rimi as a new addition to the "Seeking Information" list. He was being sought for questioning relating to any knowledge he might have of the USS Cole bombing.

== 12 February 2002 terror alert ==
In early 2002, according to an FBI report, as a result of US military operations in Afghanistan and of on-going interviews of detainees in Guantánamo Bay, Cuba, information became available on 11 February 2002 regarding threats to US interests which indicated that a planned attack may have been about to occur in the United States or against US interests in the country of Yemen on or around the next day, 12 February 2002. In response, on 11 February 2002, 17 suspected terrorists were added by the FBI to the "Seeking Information" list.

On 14 February 2002, several days after the FBI alert, six of the names were removed, and the FBI re-published the list as only eleven names and photos, because it was discovered that confusion over transliteration had failed to reveal initially that the removed six wanted terrorists were already in prison in Yemen.

Whether foiled, aborted, or merely incorrect specific intelligence, the 12 February 2002 attack never occurred. However, other attacks and plots in Yemen soon followed.

== Mass escape from Yemen ==
On 3 February 2006, together with 22 others, 12 of them al-Qaeda members, Al-Rimi escaped from a Yemeni jail in San'a, according to a BBC report. They reportedly escaped by digging a tunnel, 140 meters, to a nearby mosque.

Al-Rimi was removed from the FBI Seeking Information – War on Terrorism list in June 2006. He was readded to the list in 2009.

== See also ==
- List of fugitives from justice who disappeared
