= Nahdi =

Nahdi is a surname. Notable people with the surname include:

- Bassam Abdullah bin Bushar al-Nahdi (born 1976 in Saudi Arabia, identified as a Yemeni citizen), suspected terrorist
- Sulaiman al-Nahdi (born 1974), a citizen of Yemen who held without charge in extrajudicial detention in the United States Guantanamo Bay detainment camp, in Cuba, from 2002 until 2015
