= Alyan Muhammad Ali al-Wa'eli =

Alyan Muhammad Ali al-Wa'eli (born 1970 in Yemen) became wanted in 2002, by the United States Department of Justice's FBI, which was then seeking information about his identity and whereabouts. Ali al-Wa'eli was identified as a known associate of the Yemen cell leader, Fawaz Yahya al-Rabeei.

Ali al-Wa'eli is no longer listed by the FBI on their "Seeking Information" lists.

== February 12, 2002 Yemeni terror alert ==
On February 11, 2002, al-Wa'eli was named in a suspected Yemen plot, for which he was among 17 suspected terrorists (3 days later reduced to 11 suspects) were added to the FBI's third major "wanted" list, the "Seeking Information" list.

By 2006, his details had been removed and archived from the FBI's current main wanted pages.

Whether foiled, aborted, or merely incorrect specific intelligence, the February 12, 2002 attack never occurred. However, other attacks and plots in Yemen soon followed.

== See also ==
- List of fugitives from justice who disappeared
