= Bashir Ali Nasser al-Sharari =

- Born: 1970 (age 55–56)
- Military career
- Allegiance: Al-Qaeda: Al-Qaeda in Yemen (?-?); AQAP (?-?)
- Service years: ?–?
- Rank: Fighter
- Conflicts: Yemen Insurgency Yemeni Civil War ?

Bashir Ali Nasser al-Sharari (born in 1970 in Yemen) became briefly wanted in 2002, by the United States Department of Justice's FBI, which was then seeking information about his identity and whereabouts. In early 2002, he had been named in a suspected Yemen plot, for which he became listed on the FBI's third major "wanted" list, now known as the FBI Seeking Information - War on Terrorism list. He was identified as a known associate of the Yemen cell leader, Fawaz Yahya al-Rabeei. But he was quickly discovered to already be in Yemen prison, and was promptly removed from the FBI "wanted" list. Very little else is known about him.

== USS Cole bombing ==
On 12 October 2000, one year prior to 9/11, Yemen became an early theater in the war on terrorism, when the 2000 USS Cole bombing killed 17 American sailors and wounded 40 off the port coast of Aden, Yemen. In the aftermath, the government of Yemen rounded up numerous suspected terrorists, many of whom were identified as members of al-Qaeda.

== 12 February 2002 terror alert ==
In early 2002, according to an FBI report, as a result of US military operations in Afghanistan and of on-going interviews of detainees in Guantánamo Bay, Cuba, information became available on 11 February 2002 regarding threats to US interests which indicated that a planned attack may have been about to occur in the United States or against US interests in the country of Yemen on or around the next day, 12 February 2002.

In response, on 11 February 2002, Bashir Ali Nasser al-Sharari became one of 17 suspected terrorists added by the FBI to the "Seeking Information" list. The early version of that list was then known as the "Most Wanted Terrorists Seeking Information" list.

But on 14 February 2002, several days after the FBI alert, Bashir Ali Nasser al-Sharari was one of six names who were removed, and the FBI re-published the list as only eleven names and photos, because it was discovered that confusion over transliteration had failed to reveal initially that the removed six wanted terrorists were already in prison in Yemen.

The prisoners had initially gone unnoticed until Yemeni officials told the CIA station chief in San'a, Yemen's capital, that some of the men the FBI wanted were already being held. The FBI reported that agents had years earlier questioned some of the six men in connection with the USS Cole bombing in the port of Aden in October 2000. Because of the new information about the association to al-Rabeei, the FBI intended to again question the Yemen inmates.

The other names among the six identified in the Yemen plot on 11 February 2002, but who were removed from the list on 14 February 2002 as already in Yemen custody were: Issam Ahmad Dibwan al-Makhlafi, Ahmad al-Akhader Nasser Albidani, Abdulaziz Muhammad Saleh bin Otash, Shuhour Abdullah Mukbil al-Sabri and Riyadh Shikawi.

== 2002 Yemen attacks and plots ==
Whether foiled, aborted, or merely incorrect specific intelligence, the 12 February 2002 attack never occurred. However, other attacks and plots in Yemen soon followed in that year. By 2004, many of those plotters had also been captured and imprisoned in Yemen.

== Mass escape from Yemen ==
On 3 February 2006, 23 people, 12 of them al-Qaeda members, escaped from a Yemeni jail, according to a BBC report. They reportedly escaped by digging a tunnel.

The FBI added several new names to the "wanted" lists, in response to the Yemen escape of 2006. However, none of the 17 Yemen plot suspects from the 2002 terror alert appeared again among the new FBI names.

== See also ==
Buffalo Six
