= Said bin Zair =

Saudi Arabian academic

Said bin Zair (Arabic: سعيد بن زعير) is a Saudi former academic who has opposed the royal family and class-based regime of Saudi Arabia.

A former mass communications professor, Said bin Zair was held without charge for eight years for demanding reforms in the Saudi monarchy. Released in 2003, he appeared on al-Jazeera on 15 April 2004, and made remarks about the Riyadh compound bombings which resulted in his re-arrest on charges of condoning suicide bombings. His son Mubarak was reportedly arrested a few weeks later for protesting his father's detention. In September 2004 Said bin Zair was sentenced, in the absence of a lawyer, to five years of jail.
