= Omar Ahmad Omar al-Hubishi =

Omar Ahmad Omar al-Hubishi (born in 1969 in Saudi Arabia, identified as a Yemeni citizen) became wanted in 2002, by the United States Department of Justice's FBI, which was then seeking information about his identity and whereabouts. He was identified as a known associate of the Yemen cell leader, Fawaz Yahya al-Rabeei.

He is no longer listed by the FBI on their "Seeking Information" lists.

== February 12, 2002 Yemeni terror alert ==
On February 11, 2002, al-Hubishi was named in a suspected Yemen plot, for which he was among 17 suspected terrorists (3 days later reduced to 11 suspects) who added to the FBI's third major "wanted" list, the "Seeking Information" list.

By 2006, his details had been withdrawn from the FBI’s primary wanted pages and placed in archive.

Whether foiled, aborted, or merely incorrect specific intelligence, the February 12, 2002 attack never occurred. However, other attacks and plots in Yemen soon followed.

== See also ==
- List of fugitives from justice who disappeared
