= Abd al-Rahim Abdul Rassak al-Janko =

Syrian Guantanamo detainee (born 1977)

- Born: 1977 (age 48–49); Kafsanur, Turkey
- Detained at: Guantanamo
- Other name: Abdul Rahim Abdul Razak Al Ginco
- ISN: 489
- Charge: No charge
- Status: Released to Belgium

Abd al-Rahim Abdul Rassak al-Janko (عبدالرحیم عبدالرزاق الجنکو; born 1977), a Syrian-Kurd, is a former student in the United Arab Emirates who traveled to Afghanistan in 2000, where he was captured by the Taliban who announced that he had confessed to plotting to murder Osama bin Laden, as well as spying against the Taliban on behalf of Israel and the United States. He was also denounced for "his sexual indiscretions with other young men" and accused of homosexuality.

Following the Invasion of Afghanistan, al-Janko begged a British journalist to alert the Americans that he had been held prisoner by the Taliban for two years; however, he was taken from the Taliban prison by American forces, and sent to the Guantanamo Bay detention camps where he spent seven years in detention.

When a videotape of al-Janko's 2000 interrogation on charges of sodomy and espionage against the Taliban was discovered by American forces in the rubble of Mohammed Atef's house; the Bush administration released the video, which showed al-Janko breaking down in tears, but stripped the tape of its audiotrack and falsely declared that it was a "martyrdom video", claiming that al-Janko spoke of dying as a martyr following the 2001 invasion of Afghanistan. Although U.S. officials internally acknowledged the video to be his filmed interrogation by the Taliban, the American government publicly continued labelling it as a "martyrdom" recording, and added al-Janko to the FBI Seeking Information - War on Terrorism list. Amnesty International condemned the use of a video showing al-Janko being interrogated by militants as proof of his association with them as "kafkaesque".

While held at Guantanamo, his captors noted that "as a result of his [Taliban] imprisonment, [he] could not have participated in hostilities against US and Coalition forces", and noted that "it is unlikely [he] would ever be trusted by an Islamic militant group", but tribunals nevertheless repeated classified him as an "enemy combatant". Medical staff also wrote that he suffered from depression, had attempted suicide, and was diagnosed with Borderline Personality Disorder; the United States thus assessed him as a "high threat from a detention perspective" and noted that he had 112 discipline infractions on his file for throwing food, failing to follow instructions, exposing his sexual organs and possession of food contraband. Al-Janko maintains that the BPD diagnosis was intended to mask his posttraumatic stress disorder arising from his mistreatment and captivity by the Taliban and the United States.

On 20 June 2008, he became the first Guantanamo detainee to demand in a U.S. federal court that the military show evidence that justified his detention. The judge ruled that the American argument in favour of holding al-Janko in continued captivity "defies common sense".

He was quietly released by the United States in 2009, after seven years' captivity, and is currently living in Antwerpen, Belgium.

== Life prior to imprisonment ==
Al-Janko was born in Turkey, the fourth son of 11 children, and was four years old when his Kurdish parents were killed by Turkish troops in 1980. He was subsequently taken to Syria by his stepparents for the next ten years, before his Salafist stepfather took a teaching position in Ajman, UAE in 1990, and his stepmother and siblings brought him to Ajman a couple years later.

Al-Janko attended Imam Muhammad ibn Saud Islamic University in the Emirates from 1998 to 2000, studying law and literature, together with Faiz Mohammed Ahmed Al Kandari and Abd Al Aziz Sayer Uwain Al Shammeri. He told interrogators he was invited to a college party at a local hotel however, by Prince Fisal Sudid Qasmi, before he left. He says that when he arrived, group sex was underway and he participated in the orgy; but Qasmi later blackmailed him, threatening to expose the videotape to his stepfather or the media, unless al-Janko would agree to spy on professors and students advocating travel for jihad. He later retracted this statement as being coerced under torture, and dismissed his admissions of drug addiction, homosexuality and spying as all being false.

Al-Janko later told his lawyers he ended up in Afghanistan after running away from his "strict Muslim [step]father". whom he complained was "controlling, abusive and violent" and "ran away" six months after the alleged blackmail began, telling interrogators that he had unsuccessfully spoken to the embassies of Canada, Syria and the United States, seeking an opportunity to leave the Emirates behind, but eventually colleagues at the Mosab bin Omer Center, in the Mishref neighbourhood of Ajman, convinced him he could travel to Afghanistan by simply posing as an illegal Afghan migrant worker in the UAE, and then apply to Western countries for asylum as an Afghan refugee. al-Janko claims he successfully impersonated an illegal worker, and successfully got himself "deported" to Afghanistan at the expense of the Emirati government.

In Afghanistan, al-Janko used the name Dujana al-Kurdi, and spent 18–45 days at Al Farouq training camp, where he claims to have spent his time doing "menial chores" such as chopping wood, cleaning weapons and hauling water, until a commander named al-Saidi turned him over to Atef and Saif al-Adel at the Ghulam Bachi safehouse on suspicion he was a spy. Al-Janko maintains this was likely because the day he was ordered to prepare to fight on the front lines, he requested permission to leave the camp, fearing for his safety.

== Imprisonment by Taliban ==
In January 2000, after only weeks in Afghanistan, al-Jenko was taken into custody by al-Qaeda, who accused him of espionage on behalf of Israel, the United States and the UAE, as well as drug addiction and homosexual sodomy. He was turned over to the Taliban on 1 May for 25 years of imprisonment at Sarposa prison, after allegedly confessing to Atef that he was guilty, and that Arkan Mohammad Ghafil Al Karim was "the Iraqi emir of the espionage ring". Al-Karim was subsequently also arrested by the Taliban, and eventually also transported to Guantanamo alongside al-Janko.

In July 2000, the Taliban printed a transcript of the confession, which included the statements that al-Janko had been corrupted by an "evil acquaintance" who introduced him to Sony PlayStation, pornography and fictitious Israeli spymaster "Shamoyel Anty". They also played the video of al-Janko's confession on Emirati television, shaming his family and causing his stepfather to denounce him.

== Transfer from Taliban to US custody ==
Janko was one of nine American prisoners the Associated Press pointed out had gone straight from Taliban custody to American custody.

Tim Reid, writing in The Times, recorded how he met al-Janko in January 2002 when he was stranded in Kandahar after his release from two years in brutal Taliban custody. Reid described finding al-Janko, and four other foreign prisoners, as the only remaining occupants of a Taliban prison, which had been abandoned and emptied after the Taliban's collapse.

In January 2002, shortly after the Taleban had fled Kandahar after the US-led invasion of Afghanistan, I arrived in the city. Amid the chaos and confusion there was a bizarre scene playing out in the jail. The entire prison had been emptied, except for five men who had chosen to stay there because they had nowhere else to go. There was a man from Manchester called Jamal Udeen, two Saudis, a student from Tartarstan - and Mr al-Ginco. They became known as the "Kandahar Five".

While sitting in the Sarposa prison for the weeks between the Taliban's departure, and the Americans' entrance, al-Janko met with photojournalist Thorne Anderson, Michael Ware of Time magazine, Pierre Lhuillery of AFP and Tim Reid of The Times, most of whom would later submit to the courts their observations that al-Janko had clearly been physically tortured and was mentally unstable when they met him. Ware took up al-Janko's cause and sought international assistance in aiding him, as did Reid, not expecting that the Americans would take them into captivity.

== Discovery of interrogation video ==
On January 14, 2002, five video cassettes were recovered from the rubble of the destroyed home of Mohammad Atef outside Kabul, Afghanistan. The tapes showed Abderraouf Jdey, Ramzi bin al-Shibh, Muhammad Sa'id Ali Hasan, and Khalid Ibn Muhammad Al-Juhani vowing to die as martyrs. A video of Al-Rahim was also found in the rubble, of his interrogation - ostensibly following torture - by Atef himself. The video showed his reaction to Atef's questioning of his sexuality, and claims that he had spied on behalf of the Americans and Israelis.

In response, on 17 January 2002, the FBI released to the public the first Most Wanted Terrorists Seeking Information list, in order to profile the five wanted terrorists about whom very little was known, but who were suspected of plotting additional terrorist attacks. The videos were shown by the FBI without sound, ostensibly to guard against the possibility that the messages contained signals for other terrorists, although it turned out that in actuality the audiotrack would have vindicated al-Janko from the American claims.

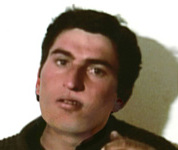
A composite image created by the FBI to show how al-Rahim may try to disguise himself.

U.S. Attorney General John Ashcroft called upon people worldwide to help "identify, locate and incapacitate terrorists who are suspected of planning additional attacks against innocent civilians... These men could be anywhere in the world." Ashcroft added that an analysis of the audio suggested "the men may be trained and prepared to commit future suicide terrorist acts."

On that day, Ramzi bin al-Shibh was one of the only four known names among the five. Ashcroft said not much was known about any of them except bin al-Shibh. The other initial known three are still featured in compiled video clips on the FBI site, in order of appearance, Muhammad Sa'id Ali Hasan, al-Janko, and Khalid Ibn Muhammad Al-Juhani. The fifth subject was identified a week later as Abderraouf Jdey.

Al-Janko, along with three others, was later removed by the FBI from the official count on the main page of the Seeking Information list. By February 2, 2003, the FBI rearranged its entire wanted lists on its web site, into the current configuration. The outstanding five martyr video suspects (including Jdey's Montreal associate Boussora) were moved to a separate linked page, titled "Martyrdom Messages/video, Seeking Information Alert" (Although both Jdey and Boussora were later returned to the main FBI list page). Around this time the FBI also changed the name of the list, to the FBI "Seeking Information - War on Terrorism", to distinguish it from its other wanted list of "Seeking Information," which the FBI already uses for ordinary fugitives, those who are not terrorists.

== Imprisonment by the United States ==
Al-Janko was held at Kandahar Air Base from January 2002 through May 2002, and was then transferred to Guantanamo's detention camps in May 2002. Al-Janko claims that, while at the Air Base, interrogators subjected him to sleep deprivation, extreme temperatures, stress positions, striking him and threatening to remove his fingernails. Like Ibn Shaykh al-Libi, al-Janko was among those who, following enhanced interrogation or torture, falsely agreed with interrogators that Saddam Hussein was supporting al-Qaeda.

Under the command of Col. Wade Dennis, American soldiers comprising an IRF team allegedly beat al-Janko and broke his knee, necessitating knee surgery in the base hospital. He later passed two kidney stones, but was refused medical treatment, ostensibly causing kidney damage.

In 2007, al-Janko wrote a suicide note addressed to his lawyer, noting "Let it be known to you that I am crying while writing this letter because of hopelessness and distress. I don’t know what to do. You and my family members are free and I am imprisoned and captive moving from one prison to another. I ask you to forgive me about whatever I do, but I have no other way to express my hopelessness". His suicide attempt resulted in fractured vertebrae, loss of bodily functions and severe pain. One source suggests he attempted suicide 17 times during his imprisonment.

== Coerced denouncements of other prisoners ==
During his testimony at his own Combatant Status Review Tribunal, an Iraqi refugee, Arkan Mohammad Ghafil Al Karim, said that after al-Janko had been arrested, tortured and interrogated by the Taliban, he had fingered al-Karim as an accomplice in the fictitious American spy ring - leading to their mutual imprisonment by the Taliban, and transfer to American imprisonment two years later.

In total, records show that al-Janko's statements to interrogators were used as evidence against a total of 20 other detainees at Guantanamo.

== Habeas corpus ==
A writ of habeas corpus, Abdul Rahim Abdul Razak Al Ginco v. Robert M. Gates, was submitted on Al Ginco [al-Janko]'s behalf. The United States Department of Defense published the unclassified dossiers from 179 captives' Combatant Status Review Tribunals.

On 16 June 2008, the United States Supreme Court declined to consider his mandamus request.

== Relocation to Belgium ==
Under the Obama Administration, al- Janko was quietly released to Belgium on October 7 or 9, 2009, becoming the third Guantanamo captive transferred to the European nation. Belgium requested the United States not disclose al-Janko's identity at the time of release.

He now lives, under an assumed identity and reliant on social assistance, in Antwerp as a formal resident of Belgium.

== Complaint for damages ==
In October 2010, Janko sued George Bush and Barack Obama for orchestrating and overseeing his torture, from being urinated on to lengthy sleep deprivation, harsh interrogations and severe beatings. The lawsuit claimed he tried to commit suicide in Guantanamo 17 times.
