= Hannachi =

Hannachi (also spelled Hanachi) is a surname common in Tunisia and Algeria. Originally designating the members of a Amazigh semi-independent tribe, the Hanencha, whose territory was located in Eastern Algeria and Western Tunisia. Notable people with the surname include:

- Maher Hannachi (born 1984), Tunisian footballer
- Mohand Chérif Hannachi (1950–2020), Algerian footballer
- Raouf Hannachi, Canadian muezzin
