= Abdul Rahman Jabarah =

Canadian killed in a July 2003 firefight with Saudi Arabian officials

- Born: Kuwait City, Kuwait
- Died: July 2003
- Other name: Abdul Tulha
- Parents: Mansour Jabarah, Souad al-Mazidi

Abdul Rahman Jabarah (عبدالرحمن جبارة) was a Canadian killed in a July 2003 firefight with Saudi Arabian officials who believed he was involved in the Riyadh compound bombings by al-Qaeda.

== Life ==
The brother of Mohammed Jabarah and a former student at Brock University, the University of Ottawa and Carleton University,

In February 2001, Jabarah left Afghanistan to visit his parents in Kuwait City, and agreed to accompany them on the Hajj pilgrimage to Mecca, since his mother had not been before. After having a "lovely time", the three of them returned to Canada - where border officials questioned the Pakistani visa in Jabarah's passport.

Jabarah met with his brother in Dubai in January 2002, when both were already considered wanted al-Qaeda suspects.

Four months later when Mohammed was arrested in Oman, Jabarah phoned his father Mansour who warned him that Canadian authorities were looking for him.

Their family immigrated to Canada on August 16, 1994. Their father, of Iraqi descent, opened a gas station in St. Catharines. Both Jabarah and his brother returned to Kuwait every summer to visit relatives, where they met with Islamic teacher Sulaiman Abu Ghaith, who would later become a spokesman for al-Qaeda.

In July 2000, Abdul Rahman left for an Afghan training camp, and the following month Mohammed flew to Kuwait where he met with Ghaith who paid his fare to Karachi, from whence he traveled to Peshawar and hiked on foot into Torkham where the two brothers met up, waiting for their promised camp to finish construction and hanging around the Sheik Shaheed Abu Yahya Training Camp near Kabul instead.

In January 2001, he returned to his family in Canada, before embarking on the Hajj to Saudi Arabia. Meanwhile, Mohammed attended a 10-week program at Al Farouq training camp before moving into a guesthouse in Kandahar where his brother later visited him.

Jabarah met with his brother Mohammed in Dubai in January 2002, when both were already considered wanted al-Qaeda suspects; likely because Mohammed's Canadian passport had been found on December 8–9 in a raid by Singaporean authorities on suspected al-Qaeda militants.

== Death ==
He wasn't heard from again until July 2003, when Saudi Arabia announced he had been killed in a shoot-out with al-Qaeda forces believed to be responsible for the Riyadh compound bombings earlier that year, with some even suggesting he had been a commander.

At 5pm on May 6, the Saudi authorities raided a weapons cache in the Eshbiliah Quarter of Riyadh, and seized 55 grenades, five large bags filled with 377 kilograms of explosives, four machine guns with three boxes containing approximately 2,250 rounds, five computers, telecommunication devices, travel documents, identity cards, notebooks, bulletins, 253,717 Riyals and 5,300 American dollars. A search of the compound also turned up a parked car with three machine guns and a number of masks. The militants drove up while the police were searching the house, and quickly fled the scene until their car stalled, at which point they carjacked a nearby driver and escaped. Six days later, the group carried out the Riyadh compound bombings that killed 26-34 people, including 9 American citizens. The authorities subsequently issued a list of 19 names tied to the bombing, including Jabarah, Zubayr al-Rimi, Ali Abd al-Rahman al-Faqasi al-Ghamdi and four of the dead bombers.

The July 3 raid in Zuhair had targeted the home of local Imam Musaad Hamdam Faleh al-Ruwaily, who surrendered himself along with Hassan Hadi al-Dossari. However, Turki al-Dandani, Rajeh al-Ajami, Amaash al-Subaie and Jabarah remained in the house and engaged in a firefight, in which they were all killed, or blew themselves up with grenades. In addition, Mohammed al-Suqabi, Nassir al-Ruwaily and Mahmoud Hazbar were arrested while trying to escape the scene.

His parents were not allowed to see or claim his body.

In December 2003, he was eulogised in a speech by al-Qaeda as a fallen martyr, in a tape labeled "The Martyrs of the Confrontations in Bilad al-Haramain".
