= 1992 Aden hotel bombings =

Terrorist attack in Yemen

- Part of the al-Qaeda insurgency in Yemen
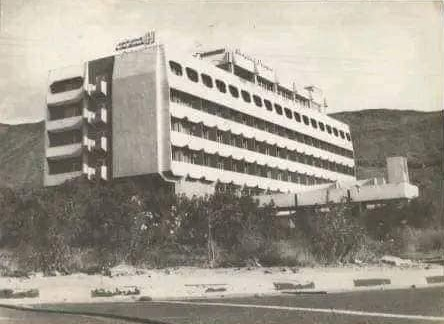
- The Gold Mohur Hotel

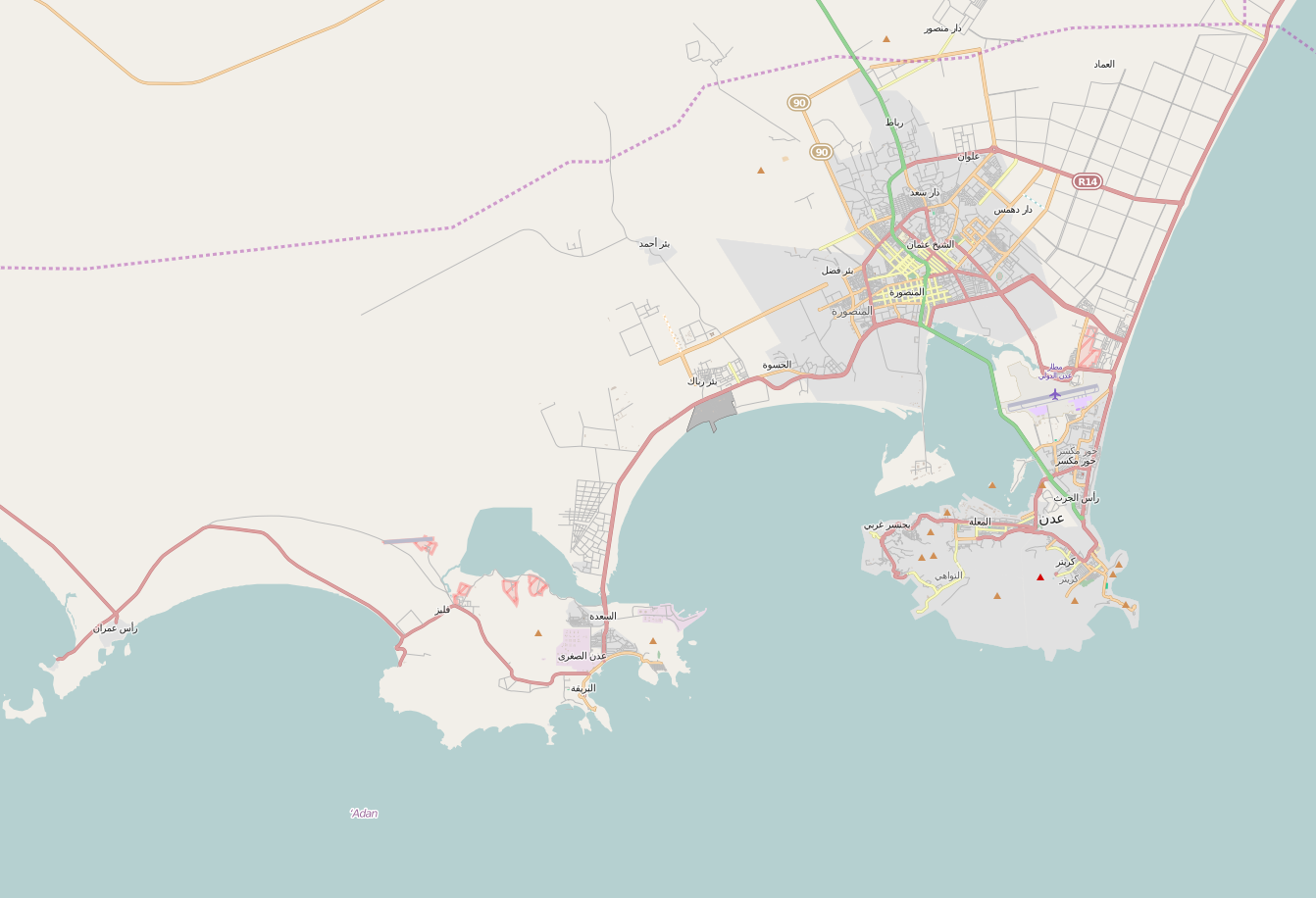
- Location: 12°48′23″N 45°1′42″E; 12°46′9″N 44°59′25″E; Aden Mövenpick Hotel and Gold Mohur Hotel, Yemen
- Date: 29 December 1992; 33 years ago
- Target: United States Marine Corps
- Deaths: 2 civilians
- Injuries: 7 (including 2 perpetrators)
- Perpetrator: Al-Qaeda
- Motive: American intervention in Somalia

On 29 December 1992, a series of bombings targeted two hotels which housed United States Marines en route to deploy in Somalia as part of Operation Restore Hope in Aden, Yemen. Orchestrated by Islamic Jihad in Yemen senior leader Jamal al-Nahdi, the bombs were planted at a restaurant in the Gold Mohur Hotel and the parking lot of the Aden Mövenpick Hotel, though the bomb at the latter hotel exploded prematurely. No U.S. Marines were harmed in the attacks, which instead killed an Austrian tourist and a hotel employee at the Gold Mohur, and injured seven others altogether. The next day, the U.S. government announced the evacuation of all U.S. forces still stationed in Yemen for the Operation in Somalia.

The bombings are sometimes considered to be al-Qaeda's first attacks against the U.S. due to the connections that Islamic Jihad in Yemen, including its leader Tariq al-Fadhli, had to Osama bin Laden financially. Bin Laden would later take credit for the attacks in 1998.

== Background ==
In the months after the Soviet withdrawal from Afghanistan, Osama bin Laden decided upon South Yemen being the next target of his mujahideen allies as well as his newly-formed outfit al-Qaeda. He intended to start an Islamist guerrilla war against the socialists with the assistance of Tariq al-Fadhli, a Yemeni Afghan Arab who despised them for removing his family from power in the former Fadhli Sultanate. South Yemen was dissolved with the unification of Yemen in May 1990, rendering the plan moot at the time. Many Afghan Arabs, some connected to Bin Laden, travelled to Yemen and established training camps after unification. Yemeni president and former North Yemen leader Ali Abdullah Saleh condoned their presence, seeking to leverage them in case of conflict with the south. With funding from Bin Laden, Fadhli led a band of fighters and established a training camp in the mountains of Abyan Governorate.

A United States-led military peacekeeping mission called Operation Restore Hope was inaugurated on 4 December 1992. Meant to provide stability and humanitarian aid to Somalia amid the civil war, Saleh agreed to the US military utilizing Aden and its port as a connecting point to reach Somalia. Bin Laden feared this agreement was an effort by the US to further expand its military presence in the Arabian Peninsula, after Saudi Arabia had agreed to host American military bases indefinitely in the aftermath of the Gulf War. From his new base of operations in Sudan, Bin Laden decided to act in order to prevent the US from establishing a permanent occupation in the region. According to Simon Reeve in The New Jackals, al-Qaeda military commander Muhammad Atef travelled to Somalia to determine methods by which the group could attack forces involved in Operation Restore Hope. After consulting Bin Laden and the Shura council, they decided upon targeting the units stationed in Yemen.

== Bombings ==
=== Planning ===
Bin Laden contacted Jamal al-Nahdi to carry out an attack based on reports he received from al-Qaeda operatives on the US military presence in Aden. Nahdi had fought in Afghanistan and was one of the first to pledge allegiance to al-Qaeda upon its formation. He was given the responsibility to plan out the specifics of the attacks. According to The New York Times, documents from the Federal Bureau of Investigation report that Fadhli was the "point man" of the bombings.

Nadhi laid out his plan to a small group of militants, many of whom attended a training camp funded by Bin Laden, during a meeting at his apartment in Aden on 23 December. His men were split into two groups; one group would plant a bomb near a runway at the Aden International Airport where a C-5 Galaxy belonging to the US Navy was set to take off, while another group supervised by Nahdi himself would simultaneously plant bombs two separate hotels where US Marines were believed to be residing. These were the Gold Mohur Hotel and the Aden Mövenpick Hotel, both international five-star hotels at opposite ends of the city's beachfront. Nearly 100 soldiers from the Marine Aerial Refueler Transport Squadron 352 of the 3rd Marine Aircraft Wing were in Aden and set to depart to Somalia.

The plan had gone awry by 28 December, the day before it was set to take place, as local authorities arrested the two militants who were set to handle the explosives at the airport. Nahdi managed to convince his cell to still go through with the attacks and tasked another man, Salih al-Khanabashi, with detonating the explosives at the airport, which were already buried near the site.

=== Execution ===
On 29 December, Nahdi and an assistant planted a bomb in a hallway closet on the fourth floor of the Gold Mohur Hotel. They were believed to have either "bribed a hotel desk clerk or brazenly walked past the front desk carrying a mysterious suitcase". They later drove to the Mövenpick Hotel where they attempted to rig a truck bomb in the parking lot. Khanabashi and his partner reached the airport but the buried explosives had already been found and excavated, forcing them to abort the plan.

A security guard at the Mövenpick Hotel parking lot noticed two men seemingly planting a bomb underneath the vehicle and began to approach them. As Nahdi was handling the explosives the detonator was accidentally triggered, producing a blast which nearly severed his hand and injured his assistant and the security guard. Police soon arrived, transporting the wounded to a hospital and defusing the explosives. Meanwhile, the bomb at the Gold Mohur Hotel detonated around 9:15 p.m. local time, sending a wave of shrapnel which killed a janitor and 70-year-old Austrian tourist Herbert Denes as he was dining in a hotel restaurant. His wife suffered critical injuries, and five other Austrians suffered minor injuries. No Americans were harmed as the Marines at the Gold Mohur Hotel had left two days earlier, and the bomb at the Mövenpick Hotel was neutralized.

== Investigation ==
After defusing the bomb at the Mövenpick Hotel, authorities searched the truck belonging to the two militants and found 25 bombs, two anti-tank mines, two detonators, two sticks of dynamite, two machine guns and a pistol, suggesting further attacks were being planned. The two were interrogated and revealed they had trained at camps in Afghanistan funded by Bin Laden. Four others connected to Bin Laden were later arrested in connection to the bombings within days. Police searching one of their apartments found large sums of money, explosives, and documents which linked them to Bin Laden. The Ministry of Interior blamed the bombings on "hirelings of foreign elements", and privately contacted Interpol to try and locate Bin Laden but did not receive assistance.

Scott Stewart, a former agent at the Diplomatic Security Service, said he spent ten days in Yemen in February 1993 alongside an FBI Laboratory explosives expert to investigate several anti-American attacks including the hotel bombings. They initially suspected the involvement of Libyan intelligence or its proxies before examining the undetonated explosives, which were assembled in the same fashion as a Central Intelligence Agency (CIA) training course on improvised explosive devices. After confirming with the local station chief that the CIA was not involved, they determined the perpetrators were likely Yemeni jihadists who received some sort of training from the CIA's Office of Technical Service during the Soviet–Afghan War. The station chief informed the Counterterrorism Center (CTC) that Yemeni intelligence believed Bin Laden was the mastermind of the bombings, but Bin Laden was relatively unknown to the CTC at the time, and no further action was taken.

== Aftermath ==
The bombings did not attract much local or international media attention. Kevin Rushby of The Guardian recalled the Mövenpick Hotel was operating regularly within weeks. However, Yemenis who had previously condoned the activities of the Afghan Arabs were disturbed, and within weeks many local young men were withdrawn from the jihadist camps by their fathers or tribal sheikhs until they were nearly deserted.

Vice president Ali Salem al-Beidh utilized the opportunity to try and end the jihadist insurgency against the socialists. The socialist-affiliated military besieged Fadhli's camp in Abyan, but he managed to evade them after agreeing to surrender to authorities in Sanaa in a deal brokered by mediators sent by Saleh, who assured the international community an investigation into the bombings. Nonetheless, Fadhli's arrest was the only disciplinary action relating to the bombings, and he was released months later to continue his attacks on the socialists, eventually siding with Saleh in the civil war of 1994.

Facing a military siege at a jihadist camp in Shabwah Governorate, Khanabashi and other militants fled to a camp further north in Saada Governorate. In the midst of depleting numbers and morale, they were taken control of senior al-Qaeda commander Abu Ali al-Harithi. Nahdi and five other militants connected to the bombing were incarcerated at the al-Mansoura prison until they escaped on 17 July 1993. Harithi then transported the six along with Khanabashi to Bin Laden's base-of-operations in Khartoum, Sudan.

In the hours after the attack, all American military personnel were airlifted out of Aden. On 1 January 1993, a spokesperson for the Department of Defense said Yemen was no longer a staging ground for Operation Restore Hope. They noted security concerns as a factor but said the primary reason was because Yemen had already been relatively insignificant for logistics after the opening phase of the operation.

The attacks received little attention in the United States as no Americans were harmed. It occurred during the outgoing days of the presidency of George H. W. Bush—when Bill Clinton took office the next month, he was not briefed on it. Former national security advisor Anthony Lake said he could not recall the response to the bombings within the Clinton administration, which "suggests what little importance Clinton and his senior officials initially put on responding to" the attacks according to Richard Miniter.

== Legacy ==
The bombings are believed to be the first attacks orchestrated by Bin Laden and al-Qaeda against the United States. They are also noted as the "ﬁrst use of strategic terrorism in Yemen" and "an early manifestation of the scripts which would be adopted by Bin Laden's burgeoning violent Islamist movement", them being the targeting of the "far enemy" in the US and the provocation of a local Muslim government to either bend to the will of the US or its local Muslim populace. The execution of the attacks has been described as "crude and rudimentary attempt at best" and indicative of "poor intelligence on the target and a lack of urban warfare skills." Despite the failure of the attacks themselves, the withdrawal of US forces from Yemen shortly after the bombings was interpreted as a victory. This view is generally considered correct by Western security analysts.

They were regarded as modest achievements in the Islamist sphere, but Bin Laden wished for further recognition.

Some of the tactics seen in the bombings would later be identified as a common pattern among al-Qaeda attacks: "the use of Arab Afghans, hidden bombs, simultaneous explosions, a willingness to kill civilians (even Muslims) to annihilate his enemies, and the use of Yemen as a staging area."

The death of civilians in the attacks provoked moral and theological uncertainty among some al-Qaeda members. This eventually led to Mamdouh Mahmud Salim providing a religious justification regarding the killing of innocents. He referred to Ibn Taymiyya's endorsement of killing Mongols and anyone associating with them or simply in their vicinity, even Muslims, to affirm that the same concept could be applied to those caught in the crossfire of al-Qaeda's attacks. The Looming Tower writer Lawrence Wright argued this fatwa, along with a previous one which authorized attacks on American soldiers, were what transformed al-Qaeda into a dedicated terrorist organization.

In Doctor, Teacher, Terrorist, Sajjan M. Gohel claims that the bombings were the first coordinated effort between Bin Laden and Ayman al-Zawahiri, alleging that Egyptian Islamic Jihad member Ahmad Mabruk had aided the perpetrators.

== Connection with al-Qaeda ==
In 1998, Bin Laden would take credit for the bombings, claiming, "The United States wanted to set up a military base for US soldiers in Yemen, so that it could send fresh troops to Somalia... The Arab mujaheddin related to the Afghan jihad carried out two bomb explosions in Yemen to warn the United States, causing damage to some Americans staying in those hotels. The United States received our warning and gave up the idea of setting up its military bases in Yemen. This was the first al-Qaeda victory scored against the Crusaders." This was not entirely true, since no Americans were injured or killed, nor did the United States recognize this action as a warning. At the time, "The troops went on to Somalia as scheduled, but the triumphant leaders of al-Qaeda said that they had frightened the Americans away and scored an easy victory."

== See also ==
- December 1998 tourist kidnappings in Yemen
- USS Cole bombing
- Battle of Mogadishu (1993)
