= Yemen model =

Current (November 2021) political and military control in ongoing Yemeni Civil War (2014–present): Controlled by the Government of Yemen (under the Presidential Leadership Council since April 2022) and allies Controlled by Houthis-led Supreme Political Council Controlled by Al-Qaeda (AQAP) and Ansar al-Sharia

The Yemen Model was the rubric for the Obama Administration's attempts to neutralize foreign terrorist groups hostile to the United States.

== Strategy ==
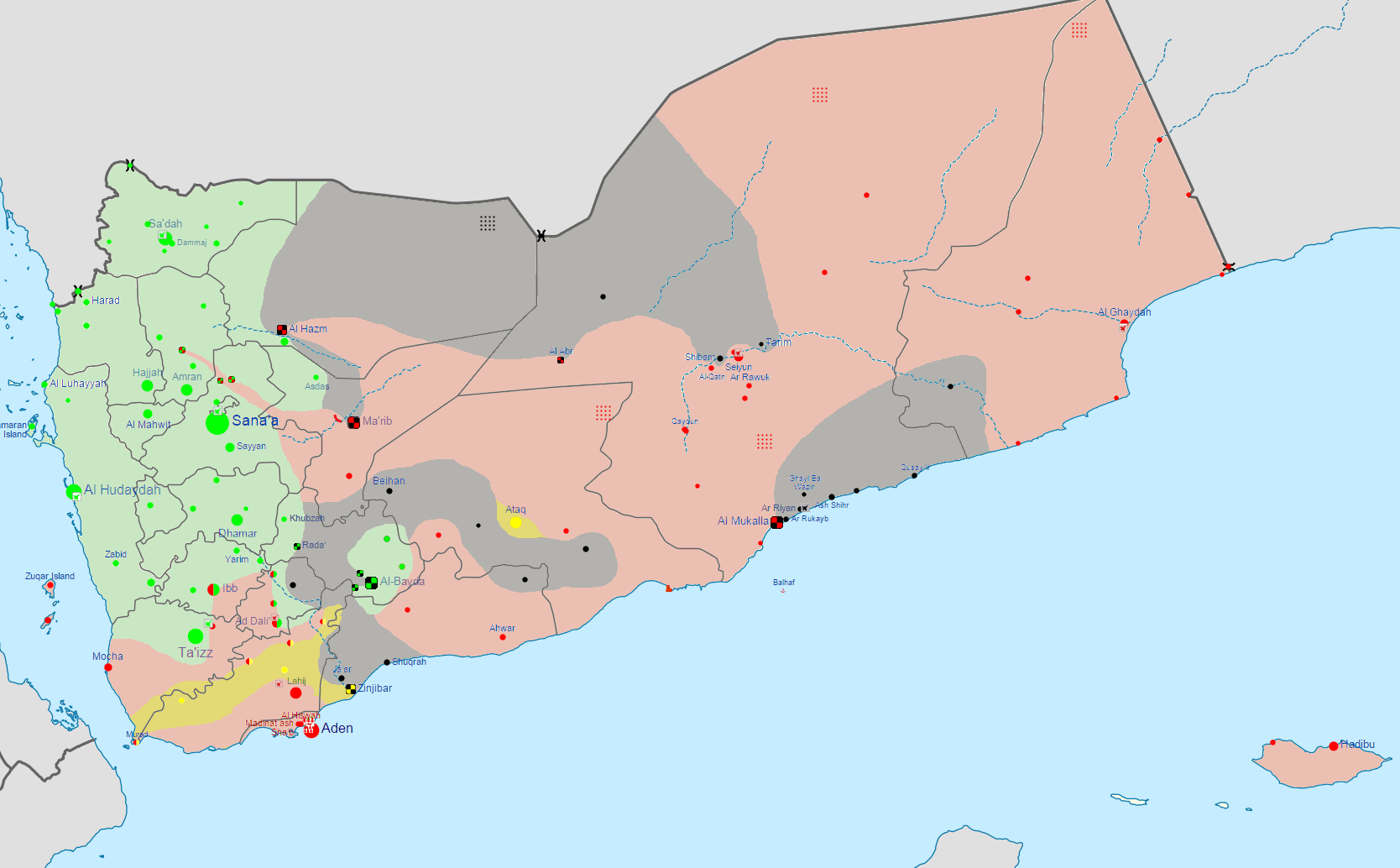
Status as of February 2015 of political and military control in ongoing Yemeni Civil War (2014–present). At that time, territory held by AQAP (grey) included portions of many provinces in eastern Yemen.

US President Barack Obama often cited the Yemen Model as his vision for dealing with insurgent groups.

Under the Yemen Model, the United States provided weapons, logistics, transportation and cash to a local proxy force, while committing no or few US troops. The United States also carried out air strikes and targeted killings of suspected opposition leaders.

== Naming ==
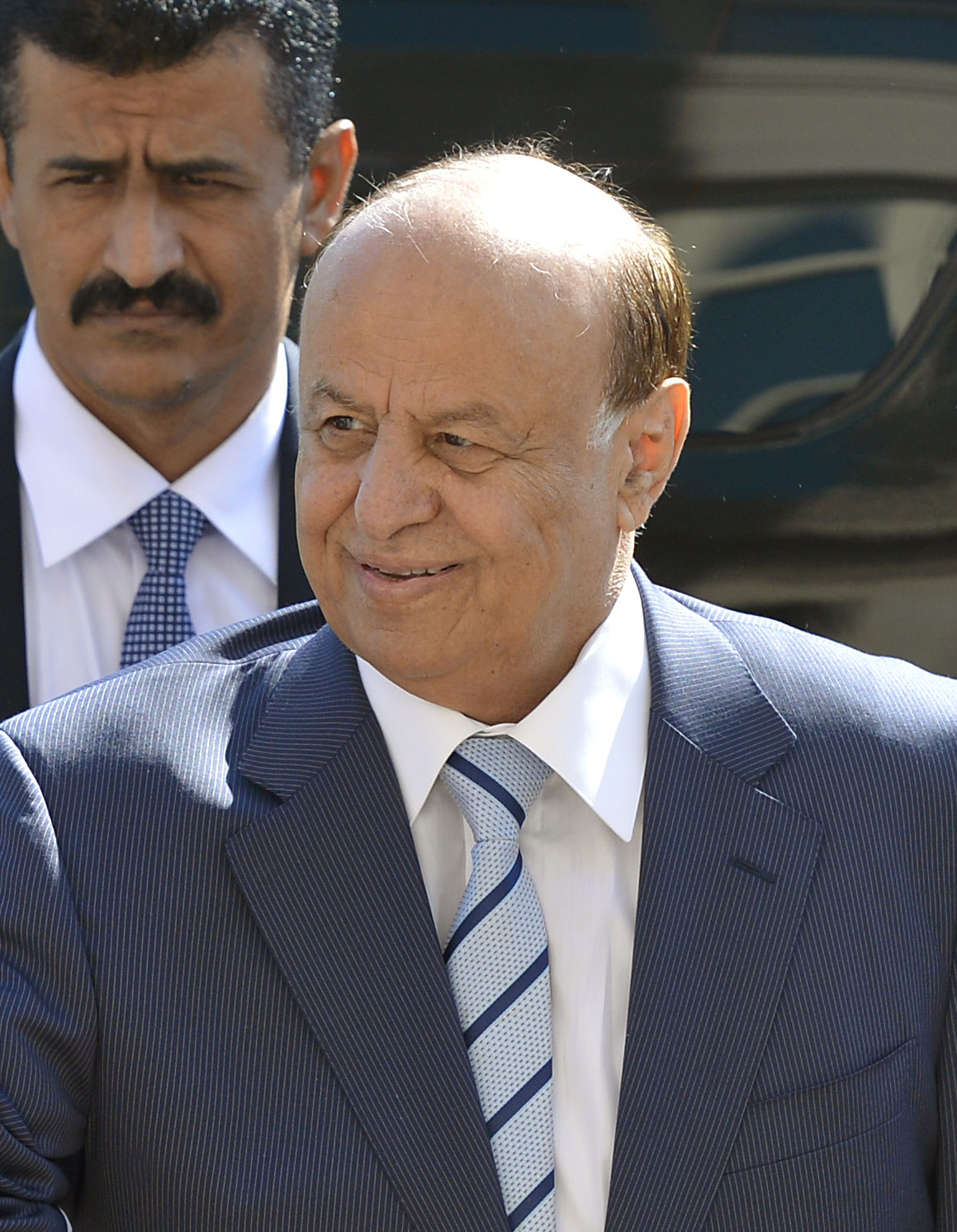
Abd Rabbuh Mansur Hadi, President of Yemen from 2012 to 2015 and the United States' man in Sana'a

The model was named after the conduct of the United States' continuing conflict in Yemen. The US wanted to minimize the ability of the Al-Qaeda in the Arabian Peninsula (AQAP) group to attack US territory, while at the same time, the Obama Administration wanted to commit as few resources to the fight as possible.

The United States picked a proxy force (in this case, tribes allied with government leader Abd Rabbuh Mansur Hadi), armed and trained them, and used them as a ground force against Al-Qaeda factions in exchange for US aid to the regime, totaling more than $600 million. The United States also conducted a significant low-tempo air and drone campaign starting in 2009. The US also occasionally launched commando raids inside Yemen and did base some military personnel in and around al-Annad air base in the south of the country.

The Obama Administration often defended its actions in Yemen as effective, and a model for other conflicts.

== Other American conflicts ==
During the early stages of the current American conflict in Iraq, Obama cited the Yemen Model as the inspiration for the conduct of the war. He went so far as to mention Yemen as a model for success during his first speech about the new war in September 2014.

The Administration also defended its efforts in Somalia as an outgrowth of the strategy.

== See also ==
- Obama Administration position on combat drones
