= Abderraouf Jdey =

Canadian citizen and terrorist (born 1965)

- Born: Abderraouf bin Habib bin Yousef Jdey; 30 May 1965 (age 61); Grombalia, Tunisia
- Occupation: Terrorist

Abderraouf bin Habib bin Yousef Jdey (Arabic: عبد الرؤوف جدي, Abd ar-Rawūf Jday) (also known as Farouk al-Tunisi and Al-Rauf Al-Jiddi) (born May 30, 1965) is a Canadian citizen who was found swearing to die as a shahid (martyr) on a series of videotapes found in the rubble of Mohammed Atef's house in Afghanistan in 2002. Since that time he has been alleged to have carried out various attacks or to be connected with various plots.

== Life ==
Jdey moved to Canada, using a false passport and seeking asylum, from Tunisia in 1991 and became a Canadian citizen in 1995.

He rented a Can$217 monthly apartment in Rosemont–La Petite-Patrie (a borough of Montreal), and studied biology at the Université de Montréal. In 1999, he wrote a pair of letters to unknown Muslims overseas, explaining how he found religion and speaking with contempt of the United States and United Nations.

American authorities allege that he "may" have trained at Mes Aynak alongside hijackers Khalid al-Mihdhar and Nawaf al-Hazmi in Afghanistan, before being assigned to a second wave of attacks. A letter written by Saif al-Adel, and later found by American forces, suggested that Jdey may have originally been slated to have participated in the original September 11 attacks.

Jdey returned to Montreal in early 2001. Khalid Sheikh Mohamed, while being harshly interrogated, said that Jdey then backed out of the plan. According to a 2010 Harvard report on al Qaeda by a former CIA officer, Jdey was detained in summer 2001 together with Zacarias Moussaoui. Moussaoui was carrying textbooks on cropdusting; Jdey was carrying textbooks on biology. Jdey was evidently subsequently released. In November 2001, he left Canada, several months after obtaining a replacement passport for one he'd received two years earlier which he claimed to have lost. He was believed to be bound for Europe.

=== Discovery of martyrdom videotape ===
On January 14, 2002, a series of five videocassettes were recovered from the rubble of Mohammed Atef's destroyed home outside of Kabul, Afghanistan. The tapes showed Jdey, Ramzi bin al-Shibh, Muhammad Sa'id Ali Hasan, Abd Al-Rahim, and Khalid Ibn Muhammad Al-Juhani vowing to die as martyrs. It was the first time authorities had reason to suspect him of any wrongdoing. NBC News said the videos had been recorded after the September 11 attacks.

Three days later, the FBI released to the public the first FBI Seeking Information – Terrorism list in order to profile the five wanted terrorists about whom very little was known, but who were suspected of plotting additional terrorist attacks in martyrdom operations. Already under fire for issuing "excessive and somewhat alarmist" warnings about terrorists plotting against the United States, Attorney General John Ashcroft stated that Jdey and Faker Boussora were likely traveling together and should be considered "extremely dangerous". A month after Jdey and Boussora were declared fugitives, the Republic of Turkey announced that the pair may be within their borders.

By February 2002, it was already rumored that American Airlines Flight 587, which had crashed the previous November in Queens, New York, had been destroyed by an unknown terrorist with a shoe bomb similar to the one found on Richard Reid. Four months later, Mohammed Mansour Jabarah agreed to cooperate with American authorities in exchange for a reduced sentence, implicating Jdey and Reid in a planned "second wave" of plane attacks against the United States.

Ramzi bin al-Shibh was interrogated at an American black site in 2003 about his knowledge of Jdey, and confessed that Jdey had been recruited by al-Qaeda. The following year Walid bin 'Attash, similarly interrogated under harsh circumstances at The Dark Prison, confirmed that Jdey had been known to him.

=== Later allegations ===
In September 2003, the FBI issued an alert for four people they alleged "pose a threat to U.S. citizens", including Jdey, Adnan G. El Shukrijumah, and the previously unknown Zubayr al-Rimi and Karim el-Mejjati.

On May 26, 2004, Attorney General John Ashcroft and FBI Director Robert Mueller announced that reports indicated that Jdey was one of seven al-Qaeda members who were planning terrorist actions for the summer or fall of 2004. The other six named were Shukrijumah, Ahmed Khalfan Ghailani, Fazul Abdullah Mohammed, Amer El-Maati, Aafia Siddiqui and Adam Yahiye Gadahn. American Democrats labeled the warning "suspicious" and said it was held solely to divert attention from President Bush's plummeting poll numbers and to push the failings of the Invasion of Iraq off the front page. CSIS director Reid Morden voiced similar concerns, saying it seemed more like "election year" politics than an actual threat, and The New York Times pointed out that one day before the announcement, they had been told by the Department of Homeland Security that there were no current risks. The day after the announcement, there was a reported sighting of Jdey and Shukrijumah at a Denny's restaurant in Colorado. The following year, another tip suggested that the pair had been seen driving a car with a Massachusetts license plate in Maine.

In April 2005, the U.S. State Department Rewards for Justice Program offered a reward of up to US$5 million for information leading to the capture of Jdey.

In 2013, it was reported that five people, including Jdey, had entered Uganda to carry out suicide attacks.
