= Muhammad Sa'id Ali Hasan =

Member of al-Qaeda

Muhammad Sa'id Ali Hasan al-Umda (died 22 April 2012), also known as Gharib al-Taezi, was self-implicated on videotape as a possible terrorist in 2002, and was wanted by the United States Department of Justice's FBI, which was seeking information about his identity and whereabouts. He was once a bodyguard for Osama bin Laden and was a field commander for al-Qaeda in the Arabian Peninsula. In January 2002, he was discovered as one of five men who had been videotaped pledging martyrdom, and who were then consequently placed on the original version, upon inception, of the FBI's third major wanted list, which is now known as the FBI Seeking Information - War on Terrorism list. He was later removed by the FBI from the list after being detained by the Saudi government and then transferred to Yemen. He was convicted in 2005 of involvement in the 2002 attack on the MV Limburg oil tanker. In February 2006, he escaped from a Sana'a prison along with 22 other militants.

== Videocassette recovery ==
On January 14, 2002, a series of five videocassettes were recovered from the rubble of the destroyed home of Mohammad Atef outside of Kabul, Afghanistan. The tapes showed Abderraouf Jdey, Ramzi bin al-Shibh, Hasan, Abd Al-Rahim, and Khalid Ibn Muhammad Al-Juhani vowing to die as martyrs. It was the first time authorities had reason to suspect him of any wrongdoing. NBC News said the videos had been recorded after the Sept. 11 terrorist attacks.

== Most Wanted list ==
In response, on January 17, 2002, the FBI released to the public the first Most Wanted Terrorists Seeking Information list (now known as the FBI's "Seeking Information - War on Terrorism" list), in order to profile the five wanted terrorists about whom very little was known, but who were suspected of plotting additional terrorist attacks in martyrdom operations. The videos were shown by the FBI without sound, to guard against the possibility that the messages contained signals for other terrorists.

Ashcroft called upon people worldwide to help "identify, locate and incapacitate terrorists who are suspected of planning additional attacks against innocent civilians." "These men could be anywhere in the world," he said. Ashcroft added that an analysis of the audio suggested "the men may be trained and prepared to commit future suicide terrorist acts." On that day, Ramzi bin al-Shibh was the only known name among the five. Ashcroft said not much was known about any of them except bin al-Shibh.

The fifth wanted martyrdom terrorist was identified a week later as Abderraouf Jdey, alias: Al Rauf Bin Al Habib Bin Yousef Al-Jiddi.

== Removal from list ==
Muhammad Sa'id Ali Hasan, along with three of the other four pledged martyrdom suicide terrorists, was later removed by the FBI from the official count on the main page of the Seeking Information list. By February 2, 2003, the FBI rearranged its entire wanted lists on its web site, into the current configuration. The outstanding five martyr video suspects (including Jdey's Montreal associate Boussora) were moved to a separate linked page, titled "Martyrdom Messages/video, Seeking Information Alert" (Although both Jdey and Boussora were later returned to the main FBI list page). Around this time, the FBI also changed the name of the list, to the FBI "Seeking Information - War on Terrorism", to distinguish it from its other wanted list of "Seeking Information," which the FBI already uses for ordinary fugitives, those who are not terrorists.

== Death ==
Hasan was killed in a drone strike in Yemen on April 22, 2012.
