= Faker Boussora =

Canadian member of al-Qaeda

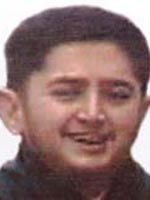
- FBI photo of Faker Boussora
- Born: Faker Ben Abdelazziz Boussora; March 22, 1964 (age 62); Tunisia

Faker Ben Abdelazziz Boussora (Arabic: فاكر بن عبد العزيز بوصرّة) born March 22, 1964, in Tunisia is a Canadian citizen, and alleged to be a member of al-Qaeda. He also went by the name Abu Yusif al-Tunisi. The US Department of State has authorized a reward of $5 million under the Rewards For Justice Program for information leading to the arrest of Faker Ben Adbelazziz Boussora.

In early 2002, he was the subject of an international manhunt, one week after his Montreal companion Abderraouf Jdey was identified as the fifth person seen on a videotape found in Afghanistan, pledging to die as a shaheed. Together with Jdey, Boussora was placed on the Federal Bureau of Investigation's newly created FBI Seeking Information – Terrorism list, along with the other four subjects of the videotape, even though Boussora was not otherwise connected to the group.

== Life ==
Boussora left Tunisia in 1988, and moved to France. In 1991 he moved to Montreal, Quebec, Canada on a student visa, where he attended Assuna Mosque, and may have met with Raouf Hannachi. Living in a Montreal suite, he continued making routine trips back home to Tunisia until 1999, when he received Canadian citizenship, and left Canada for an undisclosed location. Believed to have a serious pituitary gland illness causing "extremely poor health", authorities allege he trained at an Afghan training camp before subsequently returning to Canada.

Upon his return, Boussora rented a second-floor apartment above a tailor shop owned by Hasidic Jews. During his absence, and even following his departure from Canada, mail still arrived at his old suite from the Middle East addressed to him. In November 2001, he left Canada, believed to be bound for Europe, possibly together with Jdey.

It was the first time authorities had reason to suspect him of any wrongdoing. Already under fire for issuing "excessive and somewhat alarmist" warnings about terrorists plotting against the United States, Attorney General John Ashcroft stated that Jdey and Boussora should be considered "extremely dangerous".

A month after Jdey and Boussora were declared fugitives, the Republic of Turkey announced that the pair may be within their borders.
