= Ammar Abadah Nasser al-Wa'eli =

Yemeni Islamist militant

- عمار عبادة ناصر الوائلي
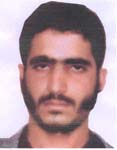
- Photograph of Waeli shared by the FBI in 2002
- Born: 1977; Yemen
- Died: 3 June 2011 (aged 33–34); Zinjibar, Abyan Governorate, Yemen
- Cause of death: Drone strike
- Military career
- Allegiance: Al-Qaeda; (Islamic State) Al-Qaeda in Yemen (2002–2009); (Islamic State) Al-Qaeda in the Arabian Peninsula (2009–2011)
- Service years: 1980s–2011
- Rank: Commander; Artillery expert
- Conflicts: Afghan conflict; Al-Qaeda insurgency in Yemen; 2007 Marib bombing; Battle of Zinjibar (2011–2012) †

Ammar Abadah Nasser al-Wa'eli (Note: Arabic: عمار عبادة ناصر الوائلي) (1977 – 3 June 2011) was a Yemeni militant associated with al-Qaeda. Raised at a training camp in Yemen established by his father on the directive of Osama bin Laden, he travelled to Afghanistan and joined al-Qaeda before returning to his native Yemen. In 2002, the United States declared him to be among a group of militants in Yemen who were actively planning terrorist attacks. Wa'eli was linked to attacks and incidents perpetrated by al-Qaeda in Yemen (AQY), including the 2007 Marib bombing, and acted as an artillery expert for it and its successor group, al-Qaeda in the Arabian Peninsula (AQAP). He was killed on 3 June 2011 by a US drone strike in Zinjibar alongside another AQAP member amid the battle for the city.

== Biography ==
=== Early life ===
Wa'eli was born in Yemen in 1977. An Islamist obituary stated that his father was "a leader of the mujahideen in Yemen" and was linked to Osama bin Laden. Bin Laden tasked him to establish a terrorist training camp in the northern Saada Governorate, which according to analyst Bill Roggio, he likely carried out in the Jabara Valley, which later became a prominent camp used by the local al-Qaeda branch to train militants as fighters to be used against the Houthis. Wa'eli attended his father's camp during his early childhood and later, still as a boy, travelled to Afghanistan, where he "spent years fighting and training with his brothers" before eventually returning to Yemen.

=== Militant activities ===
On 10 February 2002, the Federal Bureau of Investigation (FBI) issued an alert warning of an imminent potential terrorist against the United States or its oversea interests. Wa'eli was included among 17 listed individuals suspected to be involved in an al-Qaeda cell led by Fawaz al-Rubaiee, and was subsequently placed on the organization's "Seeking Information" list.

As a member of al-Qaeda in Yemen (AQY), Wa'eli was accused of being involved a 2007 bombing at the Queen of Sheba temple in Marib Governorate which killed eight Spanish tourists and two Yemenis. He along with fellow militant Hamza al-Dhayani were allegedly tasked with recruiting the suicide bomber for the attack under the orders of their commander, Hamza al-Quaiti. Wa'eli was suspected to have also taken part in the June 2009 kidnapping of a German family and a British national.

Prior to 2011, Wa'eli, as a member of AQY's successor group al-Qaeda in the Arabian Peninsula (AQAP), had been recognized as the group's sole artillery expert, though the effectiveness of his skills could not be greatly utilized as the group had in its possession only one B-10 recoilless rifle in that time period. Regardless, he managed to "transferred his expertise to others" within the group by the time of his death. Wa'eli also served the role of "an important arms dealer" for the group. The Yemen Times reported that the Yemeni government claimed he was involved in the sale of weapons and ammunition to the Houthis to provide funding for AQAP.

On 15 January 2010, the Yemeni government claimed that it had killed six AQAP leaders in an airstrike on two vehicles, including Wa'eli, though this was later proved to be false. In September 2010, it was announced that he along with other militants involved would be tried in absentia for their roles in the Marib bombing. On 3 March 2011, a Yemeni judge sentenced Wa'eli to 15 years of imprisonment for the bombing.

== Death ==
On 3 June 2011, an airstrike on a vehicle in the city of Zinjibar, Abyan Governorate, killed Wa'eli along with Ali Abdullah Naji al-Harithi, a fellow AQAP commander and former member of al-Qaeda in Iraq. The strike had occurred amid the Battle of Zinjibar, as the Yemeni Army attempted to regain control of the city from AQAP's newly formed local insurgent wing, Ansar al-Sharia, which seized it earlier in May. American officials speaking to ABC News confirmed that the strike had been launched by a drone operated by the military's Joint Special Operations Command. US fighter aircraft were also present, but did not directly launch the strike. AQAP confirmed the deaths of the two in July through a set of obituaries in their e-magazine, Inspire.
