= Gold Mohur Hotel =

Hotel in Aden, Yemen

Coordinates: 12.7692°N 44.9903°E

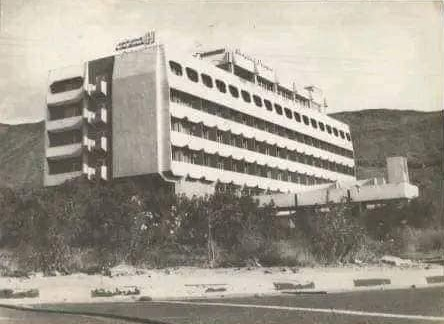
- The Gold Mohur in the 1980s

General information
- Location: Aden, Yemen

Website
- goldmohurhotel.com

The Gold Mohur Hotel (Arabic: فندق جولدمور; /ˈmɔːr/) is a resort hotel in Aden, Yemen. The hotel gained international attention during the 1992 Aden hotel bombings, when two tourists were killed at the Gold Mohur in a terrorist attack.

== History ==
A letter from United States Navy architect Cy Hamlin described the hotel as having opened around 1979 by a group of Bulgarians, who still operated the hotel during his time in Yemen in November 1989.

=== 1992 bombing ===
On 29 December 1992, the militant organization al-Qaeda, led by Osama bin Laden, conducted its first known terrorist bombings, targeting the Gold Mohur and the Mövenpick Hotel in Aden. The hotels were targeted because U.S. troops had been staying at them while en route to Somalia to participate in Operation Restore Hope. A Yemeni hotel worker and an Austrian tourist died at the Gold Mohur.

=== Post-bombing ===
The hotel underwent a $13 million renovation project to modernize its facilities and be on-par with other international hotels. President Ali Abdullah Saleh was in attendance for the inauguration of the hotel on 1 December 1999. By 2001, the hotel had 130 rooms, including a royal suite, eight gold suites, and eight junior suites, along with restaurants, banquet halls, and conference facilities. In April 2001, Al-Kathiri Group for Investment, the hotel's ownership group, signed a 20-year agreement in which the hotel would be administered by the Sheraton Hotels and Resorts and be part of the Sheraton family of hotels, being known as the Sheraton Gold Mohur-Aden Hotel. Also announced at the same time as the agreement were plans for further improvements to the hotel. The al-Gabal Restaurant opened at the hotel in August 2002.
