= Zubayr Al-Rimi =

Zubayr al-Rimi زبير الريمي
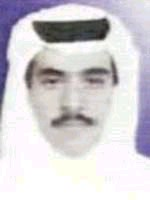
- Born: August 19, 1974; Saudi Arabia
- Died: September 23, 2003 (aged 29); Jizan, Saudi Arabia
- Other names: Ahmad Al-Na'Mi; Ibrahim Al Subah
- Spouse: Hanan Raqib

Sultan Jubran Sultan al-Qahtani (سلطان جبران سلطان القحطاني) (August 19, 1974 – September 23, 2003; also known as Zubayr al-Rimi) was a militant in al-Qaeda's Saudi wing.

Accused of complicity in the Riyadh compound bombings, al-Rimi was alternately reported as surrendering himself to authorities or dying in a September 2003 shootout.

== Life ==
The son of a security officer, al-Rimi attended Zutanya College in Adha for three years, and married the Moroccan Hanan Raqib.

On September 1, 2001, al-Rimi told his father he was leaving southern Saudi Arabia to perform hajj, but secretly traveled to Afghanistan where he met with militant leaders.

In December, al-Rimi participated in the Battle of Tora Bora which saw Osama bin Laden escape from a snare set by American forces.

He returned to Saudi Arabia in approximately January 2002, and re-enrolled in classes and finished his degree in Physical Education, before again returning to Afghanistan.

In November 2002, al-Rimi was introduced to the American Ahmed Omar Abu Ali by their mutual friend Moeith al- Qahtani who had studied at the Islamic University of Medina. Several months later, al-Rimi introduced Abu Ali to Ali Abd al-Rahman al-Faqasi, who sent the American back to his country to await further instructions.

At 5 pm on May 6, the Saudi authorities raided a weapons cache in the Eshbiliah Quarter of Riyadh, and seized 55 grenades, five large bags filled with 377 kilograms of explosives, four machine guns with three boxes containing approximately 2,250 rounds, five computers, telecommunication devices, travel documents, identity cards, notebooks, bulletins, 253,717 Riyals and 5,300 American dollars. A search of the compound also turned up a parked car with three machine guns and a number of masks. The militants drove up while the police were searching the house, and quickly fled the scene until their car stalled, at which point they carjacked a nearby driver and escaped.

Six days later, the group carried out the Riyadh compound bombings that killed 26–34 people, including 9 American citizens. The authorities subsequently issued a list of 19 names tied to the bombing, including al-Rimi, Abdul Rahman Jabarah, al-Faqasi and four of the dead bombers.

From May 26–27, the Saudi authorities raided a number of suspected terrorist hideaways, killing or capturing six of the 15 men from their list. Again, both al-Rimi and al-Faqasi escaped from an assaulted farm, this time dressed in women's clothing.

On May 27, Abu Ali messaged al-Rimi in Arabic, making a veiled reference to the Saudi raid;

"Peace, How are you and how is your family? I hope they are good. I heard the news about the children's sickness. I wish them a speedy recovery, God willing. Anyway, please keep in touch. Greetings to the group, Hani"

Al-Rimi's wife was arrested in the beginning of June along with the wife of al-Faqasi and two other women. She was turned over to his father for safekeeping, who sought to return her to Morocco.

Al-Rimi replied to Abu Ali on June 6, explaining that he had escaped the raid, but did not know the extent of who else had been captured, except that he had heard 'Adil was similarly safe. He cautioned Abu Ali to ready himself, and refrain from any risky behaviour which might give away his cover;

"To my brother, Peace to you with God's mercy and blessings. Thank God, I am fine. I was saved from the accident by a great miracle. I ask God that I would be thankful to Him. I have no idea about the others. However, according to what one doctor mentioned, 'Adil was not with them, thank God. The important thing is to get yourself ready for the medical checkup because you may have an appointment soon. Therefore, you must keep yourself ready by refraining from eating high fat meals and otherwise."

He wrote a letter to Saudi scientists, another to militants, another to his family, one to his wife, one to Qahtan Ghamdi, one to American president George W. Bush, and a public letter insisting he had not been involved in the Riyadh bombings but would continue to fight against American presence in the Arabian Peninsula.

In September 2003, the FBI issued an alert for four people they alleged "pose a threat to U.S. citizens", including Abderraouf Jdey, Adnan G. El Shukrijumah and the previously unknown al-Rimi and Karim el-Mejjati. His father stated that it was unlikely al-Rimi was in the United States, since he was unable to speak English.

== Death ==
On September 23, Saudi forces stormed a farmhouse outside Jizan's King Fahd Hospital, leading the militants inside to flee to the neighbouring apartment complex where they had been allowed to live by a married couple who worked as pharmacist and doctor in the hospital. Inside, the militants took doctors and nurses hostages, and carried them to the roof of the building. Authorities used loudspeakers to warn the 3000 residents of the building to remain in their apartments and avoid windows, and began firing tear gas and assaulting the housing compound.

After killing Sergeant Hussein Mifrej Hanthool and "slightly" wounding four other officers, the hostages were released and two gunmen surrendered, while the other three militants were killed. While some sources reported that al-Rimi was among those who surrendered, Saudi security forces later clarified that he, Khalid bin Muhammad bin Ali al-Isa al-Shahri and Turki ibn Saeed al-Thaqfan al-Bishri were killed in the 6- to 18-hour firefight.

His body was identified by his father. In the following days, authorities raided a number of homes al-Rimi had rented in Marbah, seizing weapons and explosives he had stored in the properties.

Two months after his death, he was eulogised in a speech by al-Qaeda as a fallen martyr, in a tape labeled "The Martyrs of the Confrontations in Bilad al-Haramain".
