= Raouf Hannachi =

Tunisian born Canadian citizen

Raouf Hannachi is a Tunisian born Canadian citizen who served as the Muezzin at the Assuna Mosque in Montreal. In October 2001, he was captured by the United States government and transferred to Tunisian officials, where he was subsequently jailed.

Hannachi became a Canadian citizen in 1986 and lived in Montreal with his wife. He was an active member of al-Qaeda and returned from Afghanistan in the summer of 1997 after training for jihad at the Khalden Camp. He shared his experiences with Ahmed Ressam, encouraging him to undergo training, and facilitated Ressam's and Mustapha Labsi's journey to the camp.

During interrogations by American intelligence, Abu Zubaydah, under duress, mentioned Hannachi's name among numerous others as potential conspirators. Individuals allegedly recruited by Hannachi include Djamel Ameziane, who was detained at Guantanamo Bay, and Ahmed Ressam, who became known as the "Millennium bomber." Hannachi is also accused of providing financial support for their travel to Afghanistan and the Khalden training camp. Additionally, Adil Charkaoui, held in Canada on a "Minister's Security Certificate," is among those linked to Hannachi.

Hannachi's Montreal apartment was wiretapped by the Canadian Security Intelligence Service (CSIS), which referred to his circle of associates as the "Bunch of Guys" (BOG). Despite the casual attitude and boasting of the group, one of its members, Ahmed Ressam, attempted to carry out a terrorist attack on Los Angeles International Airport.

== See also ==
- Faker Boussora
