= Khalid al-Juhani =

Saudi member of al-Qaeda

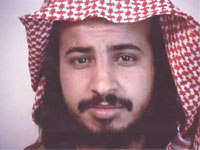
- A still photo from al-Juhani's video message. His, Jdey's and bin al-Shibh's videos were never released.
- Born: c. 1974; Saudi Arabia
- Died: 12 May 2003 (aged approximately 29); Riyadh, Saudi Arabia

Khalid Mohammad bin Muslim Al-Arawi Al-Juhani (Arabic: خالد بن محمد مسلم الجهني, also known as Mu'awiyah al-Madani; died 12 May 2003) was a Saudi member of al-Qaeda. He appeared, cradling a rifle, in a 2002 videotape in which he promised a "martyrdom" attack. In 2003, the Saudi government identified al-Juhani as one of twelve dead perpetrators of the Riyadh compound bombings based on DNA found at the scene.

== Life ==
Al-Juhani was once a bodyguard for Osama bin Laden. He fled Afghanistan, along with Saleh al-Oufi, in late 2001 following the American invasion.

On 14 January 2002, a series of five video cassettes were recovered from the rubble of the destroyed home of Mohammad Atef outside of Kabul, Afghanistan. The tapes showed Abderraouf Jdey, Ramzi bin al-Shibh, Muhammad Sa'id Ali Hasan, and al-Juhani vowing to die as martyrs. It was the first time authorities had reason to suspect him of any wrongdoing. NBC News said the videos had been recorded after the September 11 terrorist attacks.

After the tape was discovered, and the Saudi newspaper Al-Watan contacted his family members, they said he spent three years fighting in Afghanistan from the time he was 18 years old in 1992, and another three years fighting in Chechnya. They believed he had been left mentally ill "as a result of pressure he faced during the [Afghan] war". He fled Afghanistan during the American invasion, and moved to Yemen, before moving to Riyadh in 2003. In Saudi Arabia, Karim el-Mejjati agreed to allow al-Juhani to live with his family. He tried to find a wife for al-Juhani, who was not supposed to be involved in any more fighting.

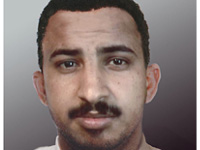
A composite image created by the FBI to show how Juhani may try to disguise himself.

On 23 March 2003, el-Mejjati's wife and 10-year-old son, Ilyass, left the city to try to reach an ophthalmologist. They had been originally intended to travel with al-Juhani, which caught the attention of the Mabahith secret police. However, al-Juhani argued he wasn't feeling well and asked a brother and his wife to instead accompany el-Mejjati and her son. The group was nonetheless arrested by authorities who hoped that al-Juhani was present.

Al-Juhani was identified as one of the twelve suicide bombers in the May 2003 suicide bombing attacks in Riyadh.
