= Islamic Jihad in Yemen =

Islamist mitant organization in Yemen

- الجهاد الاسلامي في اليمن
- Other name: Yemeni Islamic Jihad
- Founder: Tariq al-Fadhli
- Leaders: Tariq al-Fadhli; Jamal al-Nahdi
- Dates active: 1990 – July 1994
- Allegiance: al-Qaeda
- Headquarters: Abyan Governorate
- Active regions: Yemen: Abyan Governorate; Shabwah Governorate; Hadhramaut Governorate; Aden Governorate; Yafa'a mountains
- Ideology: Sunni Islamism; Islamic fundamentalism
- Status: Disbanded
- Size: 200
- Wars: Al-Qaeda insurgency in Yemen; Yemeni civil war (1994)

The Islamic Jihad in Yemen (Arabic: الجهاد الإسلامي في اليمن, romanized: al-Jihad al-Islami fi Yemen) (IJY, IJM) was an Islamist militant group based in Yemen which operated from 1990 to 1994. The group was established by former Afghan mujahideen who travelled to fight the South Yemen government, with the support and financing of Osama bin Laden. Led by Tariq al-Fadhli, the group carried out the 1992 Aden hotel bombings on the orders of bin Laden, constituting the first al-Qaeda attack against the United States. Later on, the group participated in the Yemeni civil war of 1994, fighting against the southern secessionist Democratic Republic of Yemen on the side of the northern government. Shortly after the war, IJY's main leaders were offered government positions and disbanded the group in the same year.

== History ==
=== Formation ===
After the withdrawal of the Soviet Union from Afghanistan in 1989, most foreign fighters participating in the Soviet–Afghan War, including Yemeni Arabs, left to resettle in their home countries. Some Yemeni veterans of the war sought to continue their jihad against their home governments. This sentiment was shared by Osama bin Laden, who among other priorities set his sights on regime change against the People's Democratic Republic of Yemen, the secular, socialist state occupying the southern portion of the country. Between 1988 and 1990, bin Laden provided resources, arms and recruits from Afghanistan to South Yemen to fight the socialist government. These fighters, trained by bin Laden and consisting of Yemenis, Afghans and other foreigners, would coalesce into Islamic Jihad in Yemen some time in pre-unification 1990 under the leadership of Tariq al-Fadli, an influential southern tribesman and fighter in Afghanistan with ties to bin Laden.

=== Aden hotel bombings ===
On 29 December 1992, a series of simultaneous bombings occurred at two different hotels in Aden in an attempt to target United States Marines set to be deployed in Somalia as a part of Operation Restore Hope. Senior IJY leader Jamal al-Nahdi along with an assistant, who were both trained in Afghanistan, planted a bomb at the Gold Mohur hotel and later attempted the same at the Mövenpick hotel, though the truck bomb for the latter ended up exploding prematurely, tearing off al-Nadhi's left hand and detonating the other bomb, which was placed at wrong hotel. The attack, which ended up killing an Austrian tourist and a hotel employee rather than any US soldiers, was planned by al-Fadli and al-Nadhi and directed by bin Laden. It is often considered al-Qaeda's first attack against the United States.

=== Participation in the Yemeni civil war ===
Despite the dissolving of the PDRY in May 1990 with the unification of North and South Yemen, many members of the Yemeni Socialist Party maintained leadership positions in the newly formed Republic of Yemen, and the unity government failed on delivering the promise of an Islamic state. Beginning in early 1993, assassinations against Marxist officials in southern Yemen increased exponentially, with more than 150 Politburo officials and supporters being killed by the time of the 1993 Yemeni parliamentary election in April. This upsurge was blamed on IJY with the alleged support of northern-linked security forces. A former al-Qaeda member testifies that at least four arms crates were shipped to the group from Sudan in 1993 in order to "give our brothers in South Yemen some weapons to help them to fight the communists."

By May 1994, tensions between the YSP and the northern government had spiraled into a civil war. Yemeni President Ali Abdullah Saleh saw the jihadists as an ally against the YSP, which threatened his power. Tariq al-Fadhli and IJY fought alongside North Yemeni forces, with General Ali Mohsen al-Ahmar utilizing the jihadists as a proxy force and granting al-Fadhli the rank of colonel. On 4 July 1994, members of IJY alongside northern forces took control of Aden, forcing YSP leadership to flee and ending the conflict.

=== Disbandment ===
After the civil war, IJY leaders Tariq al-Fadhli and Jamal al-Nahdi were both given roles within the ruling General People's Congress party in exchange for disbanding the group and renouncing jihadism. The announcement was received negatively by some members of the group, who responded by administering their own Islamic government in areas of southern Yemen. Negotiations with the government to end the activities of IJY broke down on requests that members of the group should be given military employment as well as the enforcement of sharia in Aden. With negotiations failing, in July 1994, IJY fighters seized a security outpost in the Crater district of Aden. The Yemeni government then quickly cracked down on the group, killing 12 members by the end of the month with the rest either being arrested or going into hiding. Thousands of foreign fighters and non-Yemeni Afghan Arabs would be deported in 1995 and 1996. IJY remnants in Abyan Governoraet eventually coalesced around Abu Hasan Zayn al-Abadin al-Mihdhar to form the Aden-Abyan Islamic Army.

== Organization ==
=== Ideology ===
According to CTC Westpoint, IJY never obtained a solid ideological foundation; instead, it was an "awkward union of indigenous movements opposed to the Yemen Socialist Party." Due to its diverse membership, the group never displayed a unified goal despite calling for Islamic governance throughout the country.

=== Membership ===
IJY was composed primarily of Islamists, but also hosted many moderate republicans loyal to North Yemen and independent tribesmen who sought to exert more control over their territory in the South.

=== Size ===
The group reportedly operated at least one training camp in the mountains of Abyan, where it had around 200 militants based.

== Attack on the US embassy in Sanaa ==
A group going by the name of Islamic Jihad in Yemen claimed responsibility for the attack on the US embassy in Sanaa on 17 September 2008. Despite this, the group displays no clear connections with the IJY group from the 1990s, and blame for the attack is commonly attributed to al-Qaeda in Yemen.

== See also ==
- Al-Qaeda insurgency in Yemen
- Al-Qaeda in the Arabian Peninsula
- Aden-Abyan Islamic Army
