= Terrorism in Yemen =

In its war on terrorism in Yemen, the US government describes Yemen as "an important partner in the global war on terrorism". There have been attacks on civilian targets and tourists, and there was a cargo-plane bomb plot in 2010. Counter-terrorism operations have been conducted by the Yemeni police, the Yemeni military, the U.S. Central Intelligence Agency, and the U.S. Department of Defense - U.S. Special Operations Forces and United States Central Command.

== Attacks on civilian targets ==
Deputy interior minister Mutaher Rashad al-Masri said approximately 30 attacks were carried out by militants in Yemen from 2000 to 2006.

=== Limburg attack ===
In October 2002, near the port of Mukalla, suicide bombers rammed an explosive-laden boat into the Limburg, a French oil tanker, killing a Bulgarian crew member and spilling 90,000 barrels (14,000 m^{3}) of oil into the Gulf of Aden. Saudi born Abdulraheem al-Nashiri, prime suspect of the USS Cole bombing, paid $40,000 to fund the Limburg attack. With that money, the former al-Qaeda leader Abu Ali al-Harithi bought the explosives and transported them from his house in Shabwa to Mukalla in Hadramut.

=== Civil Aviation, Meteorological Authority and helicopter attacks ===
On November 3, 2002, there was an attack on a helicopter carrying Hunt Oil Co. Employees shortly after taking off from Sanaa. A missile and a machine gun were fired at the helicopter injuring two American citizens. One person was jailed for the helicopter attack as well as for bombing the Civil Aviation and Meteorological Authority building in Sanaa.

=== Jibla hospital ===
On December 30, 2002, a suspected Islamic fundamentalist terrorist killed three US workers and wounded one in a hospital in Jibla with a semi-automatic rifle. Two men were eventually convicted and executed for the attack - the gunman Abid Abdulrazzaq Al-Kamil, and the 'mastermind' Ali Ahmed Mohamed al-Jarallah, who had also been convicted of the 2002 murder of Yemeni politician Jarallah Omar.

=== Al-Salem letter threats ===
Teimani Jews reportedly fled their homes due to threats from Muslim extremists. Al-Qaeda members sent letters to 45 al-Salem Jews on January 19, 2007, accusing them of involvement in an "International Zionist conspiracy". The Jews sent a complaint to Yemenite president Ali Abdullah Saleh and temporarily moved to a hotel near Sanaa. The Yemeni government promised to protect their homes and reassured them that they could return.

=== US Embassy ===
On September 17, 2008, Al-Qaeda militants attacked the US Embassy in Sanaa. 20 people were killed, including six militants, six policemen and seven civilians. One American was also among those killed.

=== Attacks on tourists ===
A suicide bomber killed eight Spanish tourists and their two Yemeni drivers in Ma'rib on July 2, 2007. On January 18, 2008, Al-Qaeda militants opened fire on a convoy of tourists in Hadhramaut, killing two Belgian tourists, two Yemenis, the tourists' driver and their guide. In March 2009, four South Korean tourists and their local Yemeni guide were killed. Two attackers also died.

=== UAE-run secret prisons ===
In the name of punishment, Yemenis are tortured at the hands of Houthis and Saudi Arabia-led military. According to a report published by the Associated Press, the United Arab Emirates runs a network of secret prisons across southern Yemen, where several hundreds of Yemenis on suspicion of being al-Qaida or Islamic State militants are held.

According to former detainees, families of prisoners, civil rights lawyers and Yemeni military officials, there are at least 18 lock-ups hidden away in military bases, air and seaports, the basements of private villas and even a nightclub. Prisoners are held without any charges, with the Yemeni government having no control over these UAE-run prisons.

Beir Ahmed prison in the southern city of Aden is one such prison, where detainees are tortured and sexually assaulted by the UAE officers. Prisoners are electrocuted by their genitals and rocks are hung from their testicles. They are also sexually violated with wooden and steel poles. In March 2018, Emirati officers blind-folded and handcuffed all the detainees of Beir Ahmed prison and made them stand under the sun until noon. The detainees were asked to undress and lie down with their legs spread open. The Emirati forces then touched their genitals and probed their rectums in search of mobile phones.

=== Bin Salman mosque bombing ===
The Bin Salman mosque was bombed on May 2, 2008, at the Bin Salman Mosque in Sa'dah, and killed 15 and injured 55. Local officials believed the bomb was hidden in a car or a motorcycle.

Some witnesses said the target may have been the mosque's imam, or prayer leader, a Salafi army officer. Witnesses said he was not hurt. Military personnel are among those who usually pray at the Bin Salman mosque, which like others in Yemen caters for both the majority Sunni community and Shia Zaidis.

=== Wadi Dawan attack ===
On January 18, 2008, there was an ambush attack on Belgian tourists traveling in a convoy through Hadhramaut in the Wadi Dawan desert valley A convoy of four jeeps carrying 15 tourists to Shibam was ambushed by gunmen in a hidden pickup truck. Two Belgian women, Claudine Van Caillie, of Bruges, 63, and Katrine Glorie, from East Flanders, 54, as well as two Yemenis, a driver and a guide, were killed; another man was also heavily wounded, several others suffered minor wounds. The tourists were repatriated to Belgium on January 19, except the injured man, who remained in Sanaa.

In the wake of the attack, Belgian Minister of Foreign Affairs, Karel De Gucht originally rejected that Al-Qaeda might be responsible, explaining that although the possibility could be avoided, internecine disputes and latent Islamism also to be taken into account. A number of arrests were made on January 21. President of the European Council Slovenia released a statement saying "The EU Presidency strongly condemns all forms of violence and calls on the government of Yemen to bring the perpetrators of these crimes to justice."

== Military and police counter-terrorism operations ==
After the September 11, 2001 attacks in the United States, President Ali Abdullah Saleh attempted to eliminate the Islamist militant presence. By November 2002, Yemeni government troops had detained 104 suspected al-Qaeda members.

In December 2001 a search by government forces for two Yemenis believed to be senior al-Qaeda members hiding near Ma'rib led to a gun battle with tribesmen which ended in the deaths of 34 people, including 18 soldiers. To defuse the situation, ten Ma'rib sheikhs were detained as hostages of the state in the presidential palace for 35 days, until 43 lesser tribesmen took their place.

At the request of the United States, Spanish troops boarded and detained a ship transporting Scud missiles from North Korea to Yemen in December 2002. After two days, when the United States determined that it had no right under international law to continue detaining the shipment, it was allowed to continue on its way to Yemen.

On July 30, 2009, three soldiers were killed in a clash with al-Qaeda militants in Marib province. On December 17 the village of Al Ma`jalah was hit by a cruise missile which killed 41 people, including 14 women and 21 children; 14 were alleged al-Qaeda members. While the Yemeni government initially took responsibility, photographs of American components and a leaked diplomatic cable suggested that it was carried out by the United States. ABC News reported that US cruise missiles were part of the camp bombardment targeting Abu Hureira Qasm al-Rimi. According to local sources, 49 civilians (including 23 women and 17 children) were among those killed in the strike. That day, a clash between security forces and al-Qaeda members in Abhar left four militants dead.

An air raid targeted an al-Qaeda meeting in Wadi Rafadh, Shabwa province on December 24, 2009. Thirty-four suspected al-Qaeda militants were killed in the attack. According to security forces, Saudis and Iranians were among those killed.

== US air attacks ==
The US first said that it used targeted killing in November 2002, with the cooperation and approval of the Yemeni government. In 2004, the Australian Broadcasting Corporation (ABC-TV) international-affairs program Foreign Correspondent investigated the targeted killing and the involvement of the US ambassador as part of a report entitled "The Yemen Option". The report examined evolving tactics and countermeasures in dealing with al-Qaeda-inspired attacks.

An estimated 98 US drone attacks were conducted in Yemen from 2002 to 2015: 41 in 2012, 26 in 2013 and 14 in 2014.

=== 2002 Al-Harethi killing ===
Early in 2002 the Bush administration approved sending about 100 Special Operations Forces to Yemen.

Six Yemeni suspected al-Qaeda members were blown up in their car in Marib province in November 2002 by a Hellfire missile from an unmanned CIA Predator drone. Among the dead were Qaed Salim Sinan al-Harethi (a.k.a. Abu Ali al-Harithi), a suspected senior al-Qaeda lieutenant believed to have helped mastermind the October 2000 USS Cole bombing. Al-Harethi was on a list of targets whose capture or death had been ordered by US President George W. Bush. and Kamal Derwish (a.k.a. Ahmed Hijazi), an American.

=== 2010 al-Shabwani killing ===
In May 2010 an errant US drone attack targeting al-Qaeda terrorists in Wadi Abida killed five people, including Ma'rib deputy governor Jaber al-Shabwani (who was mediating between the government and the militants). The killing angered Shabwani's tribesmen and in subsequent weeks they fought government security forces, twice attacking a major oil pipeline in the province.

=== 2011 airstrikes ===
On May 5, 2011, a missile fired from a US drone killed Abdullah and Mosaad Mubarak, brothers who may have been al-Qaeda militants. The missile struck their car, and both died instantly. The strike intended to kill al-Qaeda propagandist Anwar al-Awlaki, but he was not hit in the strike.

On June 3, 2011, American manned jets (or drones) killed Ali Abdullah Naji al-Harithi, a mid-level al-Qaeda operative, and several other militant suspects, including Ammar Abadah Nasser al-Wa'eli, in a strike in southern Yemen. Four civilians were also reportedly killed in the strike, reportedly coordinated by American special forces and CIA operatives based in Sanaa. According to the Associated Press, in 2011 the US government began building an air base near Yemen from which the CIA and the US military planned to fly drones over Yemen. This base is located at Umm Al Melh, just north of Yemen inside Saudi Arabia. The Washington Post reported that the US previously used a base in Djibouti to fly drones over Yemen, while The Wall Street Journal reported that a US drone base in the Seychelles could be used to fly drones over Yemen.

According to local residents and unnamed American and Yemeni government officials, on July 14, 2011, US manned aircraft (or drones) attacked and destroyed a police station in Mudiya, Abyan Governorate which had been occupied by al-Qaeda militants. Yemeni media and government accounts conflicted on the number of fatalities, estimated at between 6 and 50. The same day and nearby, drone missiles reportedly hit a car belonging to Yemeni al-Qaeda leader Fahd al-Quso, but al-Quso survived the attack.

On August 1, 2011, US drones and reported Yemeni aircraft attacked three targets with bombs and missiles in southern Yemen, killing 15 suspected al-Qaeda militants and wounding 17 others. Targeted locations included al-Wahdah, al-Amodiah, and al-Khamilah in Abyan Governorate. One of those killed was reportedly militant leader Naser al-Shadadi. According to the Yemen Post online newspaper, "At least 35 US drone attacks were reported in Yemen over the last two months". On August 24, unidentified aircraft attacked suspected al-Qaeda militants near Zinjibar. The strikes reportedly killed 30 militants and wounded 40 others.

According to Yemeni officials, as reported in the Long War Journal, US airstrikes in southeast Abyan province from August 30 to September 1 killed 30 AQAP militants reportedly engaged in combat with Yemeni military forces. Two airstrikes by US-operated aircraft on September 21 reportedly killed four AQAP fighters in Abyan and seven AQAP fighters in Shaqra. On September 30 US drone-launched missiles killed four people, including al-Qaeda propagandist Anwar al-Awlaki, in Al Jawf Governorate. The strike also killed Samir Kahn, the American-born editor of Inspire magazine. It was the first known time that the US deliberately targeted US citizens in a drone attack.

A reported drone strike in Zinjibar on October 5 killed five AQAP militants. Yemeni government officials said that an October 14 US airstrike killed seven AQAP militants, including Egyptian-born AQAP media chief Ibrahim al-Bana. Eight militants were reportedly killed in an airstrike near Jaar on December 17; a December 22 drone strike near Zinjibar reportedly killed Abdulrahman al-Wuhayshi, a relative of Yemeni al-Qaeda leader Nasir al-Wuhayshi.

=== 2012 airstrikes ===
A reported US airstrike on January 31, 2012, near the city of Lawder in Abyan province killed 11 AQAP militants. The dead reportedly included Abdul Monem al-Fahtani, a participant in the USS Cole bombing. Drones engaged in three attacks in three days on March 9–11, 2012. The first strike targeted an AQAP hideout near Al Baydah, Baydah province, reportedly killing local AQAP leader Abdulwahhab al-Homaiqani and 16 of followers. The second strike, on Jaar in Abyan province, reportedly killed 20 AQAP fighters. The third strike, also on Jaar, reportedly killed three AQAP militants and targeted a storage location for weapons seized by AQAP after it overran a Yemeni military base in Al Koud the previous week. A fourth drone strike, on March 14 in Al Bydah, reportedly killed four AQAP militants in a vehicle.

On April 11, 14 militants were killed in a drone strike in the town of Lauder (northeast of Zinjibar in Abyan province). An April 22 drone strike in the Al Samadah area, near the border of Marib and Al Jawf provinces, killed AQAP senior leader Mohammed Saeed al Umda (also known as Ghareeb al Taizi). A suspected US drone strike killed Fahd Mohammed Ahmed al-Quso and another al-Qaida militant in southern Shabwa province on May 6.

=== 2013 Rada' wedding convoy strike ===
On December 12, 2013, 17 people in a wedding convoy were killed in the Rada' District of the Governorate of Al-Bayda'. The US drone mistakenly targeted the wedding convoy after intelligence reports identified the vehicles as carrying suspected AQAP members. Although five of the killed were suspects, the remainder were civilians.

=== 2014 airstrikes ===
On March 3, 2014, an airstrike believed carried out by an American drone killed three suspected AQAP members. Mujahid Gaber Saleh al Shabwani, one of Yemen's 25 most-wanted AQAP operatives, was thought to have been one of those killed. According to a statement released by the Yemeni Interior Ministry, on April 20–21 three US drone strikes killed at least two dozen suspected AQAP members and destroyed one of the group's training camps in southern Yemen. Five civilians were wounded and three killed in the attack. A June 13 suspected US drone strike targeted a car in the Mafraq al-Saeed region of Shabwah province, killing the five alleged AQAP operatives inside.

== See also ==
- List of drone strikes in Yemen
- Yemen model
