= Battle of al-Shihr =

Battle of al-Shihr may refer to:

- Battle of al-Shihr (1523)
- Battle of al-Shihr (1548)
