= Dhabba Oil Terminal =

Oil port in Yemen

Coordinates: 14.69613088°N 49.49111689°E

Dhabba Oil Terminal (Arabic: ميناء الضبة) is a key Yemeni oil port. It lies western of Ash-Shihr town in Yemen's eastern Hadramawt on the Arabian Sea. The Dhabba Oil Terminal is mainly used to export oil and gas from Hadramawt governorate.

== October 2022 attack ==
On 21 October 2022 the terminal was targeted with drones for the first time by Yemen's rebel Houthi movement. The Yemeni government said it intercepted Houthi armed drones launched against al-Dhabba oil terminal when a Greek-owned oil tanker "Nissos" was preparing to dock to load 2 million barrels of crude from the terminal. There was no damage to the port and the tanker, but the Greek company said the attack targeted a Marshall Islands-flagged tanker, the Nissos Kea.

== See also ==
- Port of Shihr
- Hudaydah Port
- Port of Aden
