= Port of Shihr =

Port in Yemen

- Interactive map of Port of Shihr
- Location within Yemen

Location
- Country: Yemen
- Location: Ash-Shihr, Hadhramaut Governorate
- Coordinates: 14.7518971°N 49.6082065°E

Details
- Opened: 1993

Port of ِِAl-Shihr (Arabic: ميناء الشحر) is a key oil port in Yemen. It is located in Hadramawt Governorate eastern Yemen. It was constructed mainly to export crude oil, but it is currently used to receive other goods.

== History ==
Port of Ashihr was established in 1993 following the discovery of crude oil in large quantities in al-Masilah (Block14) in Hadramawt. It is situated in al-Shihr city on the Arabian Sea. It is around 15 km away from Mukalla.

== See also ==
- Ash-Shihr
- Dhabba Oil Terminal
