= Al-Ghwayzi Fortress =

Al-Ghwayzi Fortress حِصْن ٱلْغوَيْزِي (Arabic)
- Mukalla, Hadhramaut Governorate, Yemen
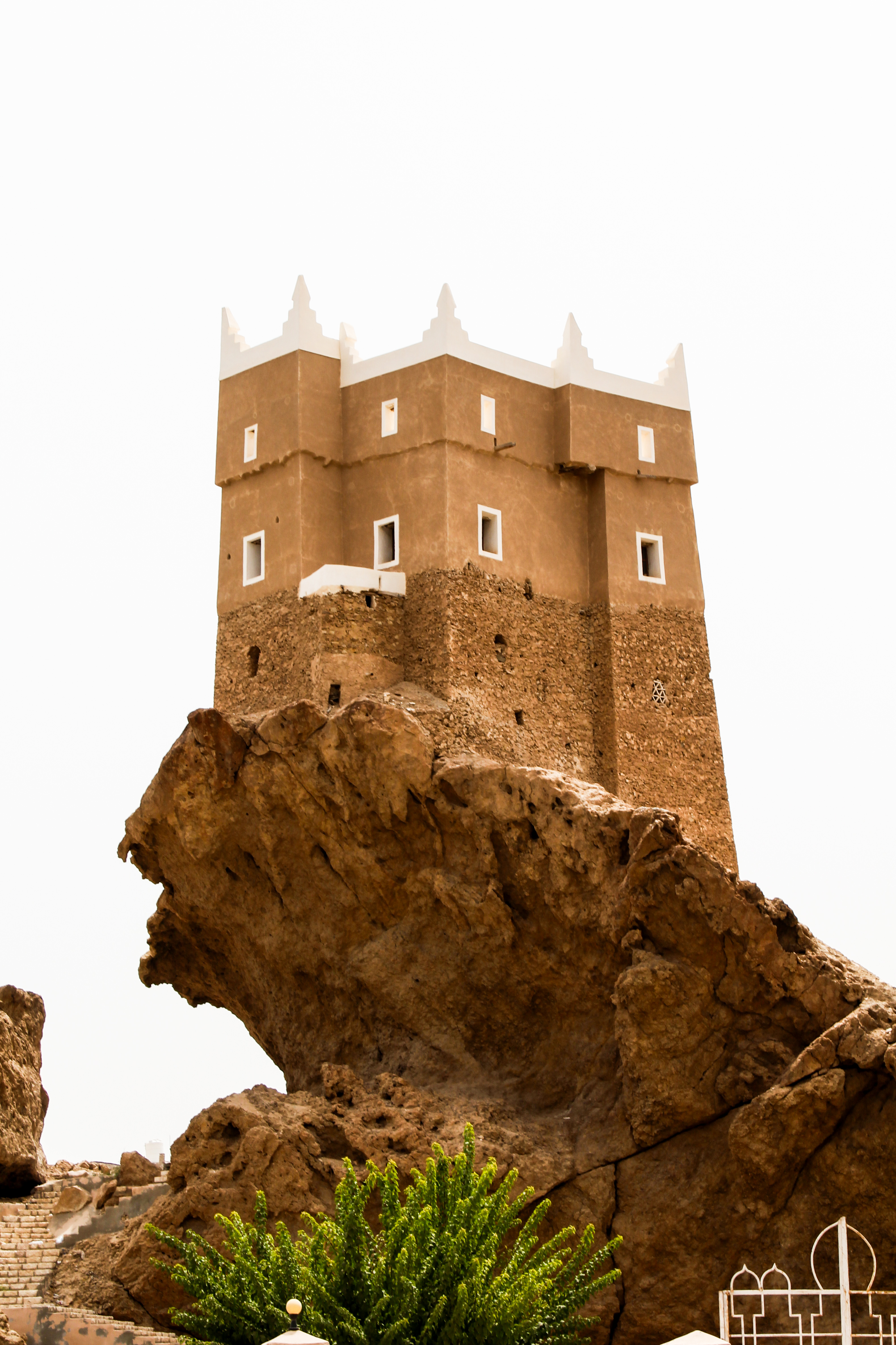
- The fort in 2021

Site information
- Type: rock castle
- Condition: Intact, in danger due to negligence

Location
- Coordinates: 14°33′30″N 49°08′11″E

Site history
- Built: 1716
- Materials: stones, bricks, palm trunks, plasters

Al-Ghwayzi Fortress (Arabic: حِصْن ٱلْغوَيْزِي, romanized: Ḥiṣn Al-Ghwayzī) is one of the old fortresses in Al-Mukalla, the capital of Hadhramaut Governorate in Yemen. It is considered an architectural masterpiece built on the foot of a rock designed to protect the city from Bedouin attacks.

== History ==
The Fortress of Al-Ghwayzi is one of the important historic fortresses in Yemen. It dates back to 1716 when the sultans of the Emirate of Al-Kassad ruled the Hadhramaut region. The fort is located in the northeastern entrance of the city of Mukalla, a historic center for visitors surrounded by a public park. Historical sources indicate that the purpose of its establishment was to monitor the military raids, which targeted the city of Mukalla on the coast of the Arabian Sea from the direction of the north, especially the raids launched by the Kathiri Sultanate occupied the city of present Seiyun, and the raids launched by the Qu'aiti Sultanate, which was stationed in the city of Ash Shihr. The city of Mukalla however was eventually taken over by Qu'aitis in 1881 and the city was designated as its capital, nonetheless the fort was kept used against the other waves of raids coming from the north of Wadi Daw'an led by the Mayor of the State Sheikh Al-Amoudi.

== Architecture ==
The fort consists of two floors. The first floor has several rooms, in which its outer walls have several circular windows facing all directions. The second floor is characterized by its wide windows. The roof of the fortress is surrounded by a barrier that reaches up to 1.5 metres (4.9 feet) from the roof level. The building materials for the barrier were traditional stones. The rest of the fort was built with straw-battered bricks and a roof with palm trunks. Its external walls were recently painted with white plaster.

== Preservation ==
Although many archaeologists have cautioned against negligence of the fortress, which turned into a birdhouse and facing serious damages, the General Authority of Antiquities are unable to make a serious move for preservation due to lack of budget to begin the restoration work. The Commission stated that if restored, it could be turned into an important tourist attraction that generates considerable income that can assist the improvement of the province, which needs substantial funding to improve its other tourist spots similarly subject to destruction. The other problems faced by Al-Ghwayzi Fortress today is the slum buildings surrounding the building, as well as many modern houses, crawling towards the area adjacent to the fort and threatening its current location. The fever of tourism investments can destroy the fort under many pretexts as well, the most important of which is the location overlooking the city of Mukalla. There is a concern regarding the exploitation of its location in order to build hotels or tourist chalets.

== Gallery ==
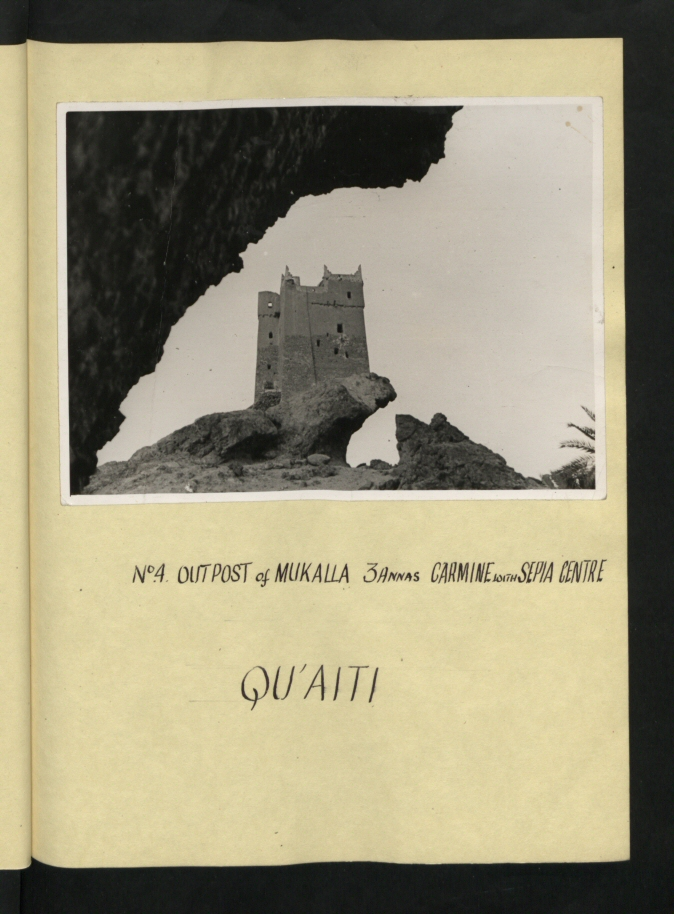
The fort in the 1940s

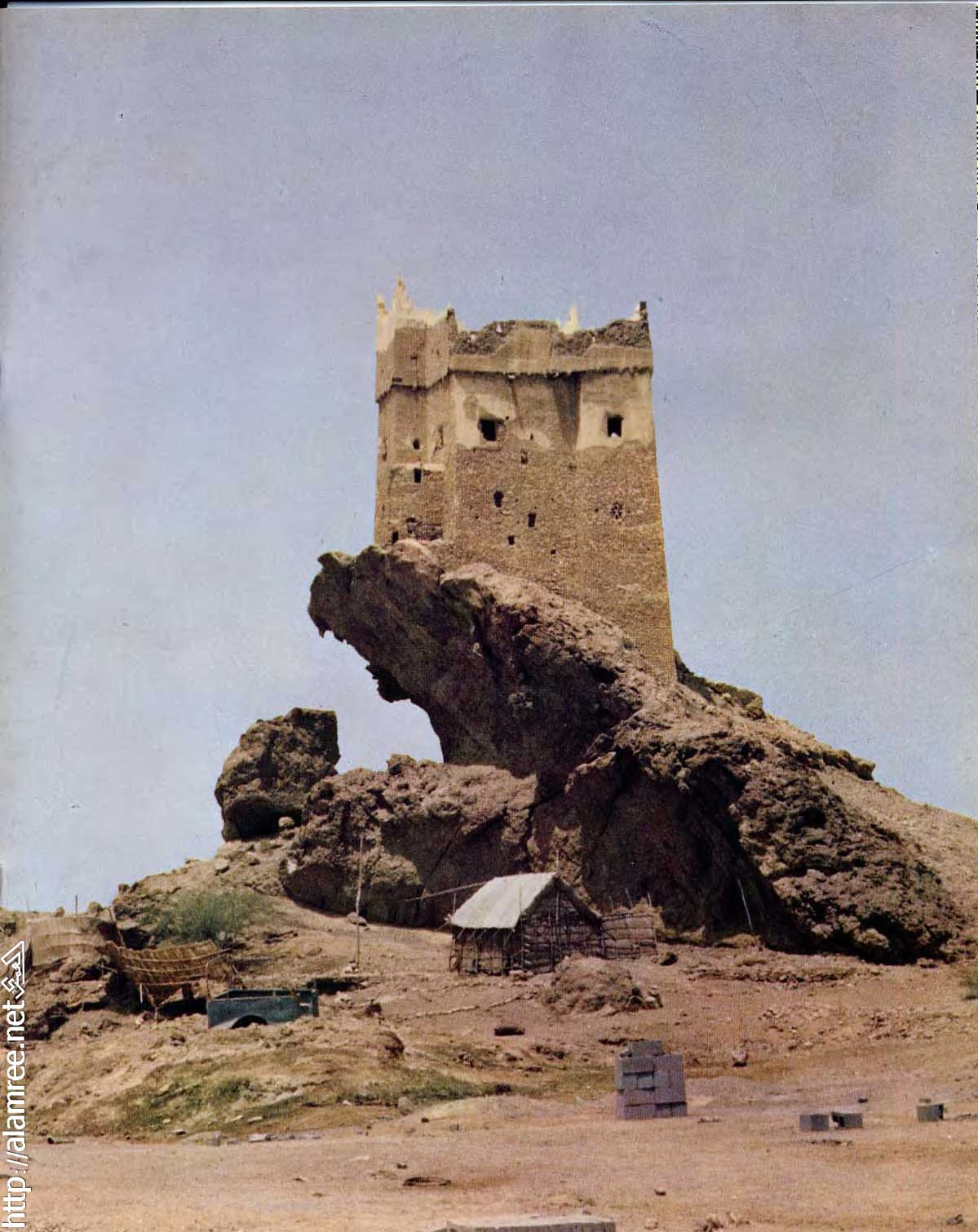
The fort in the 1960s

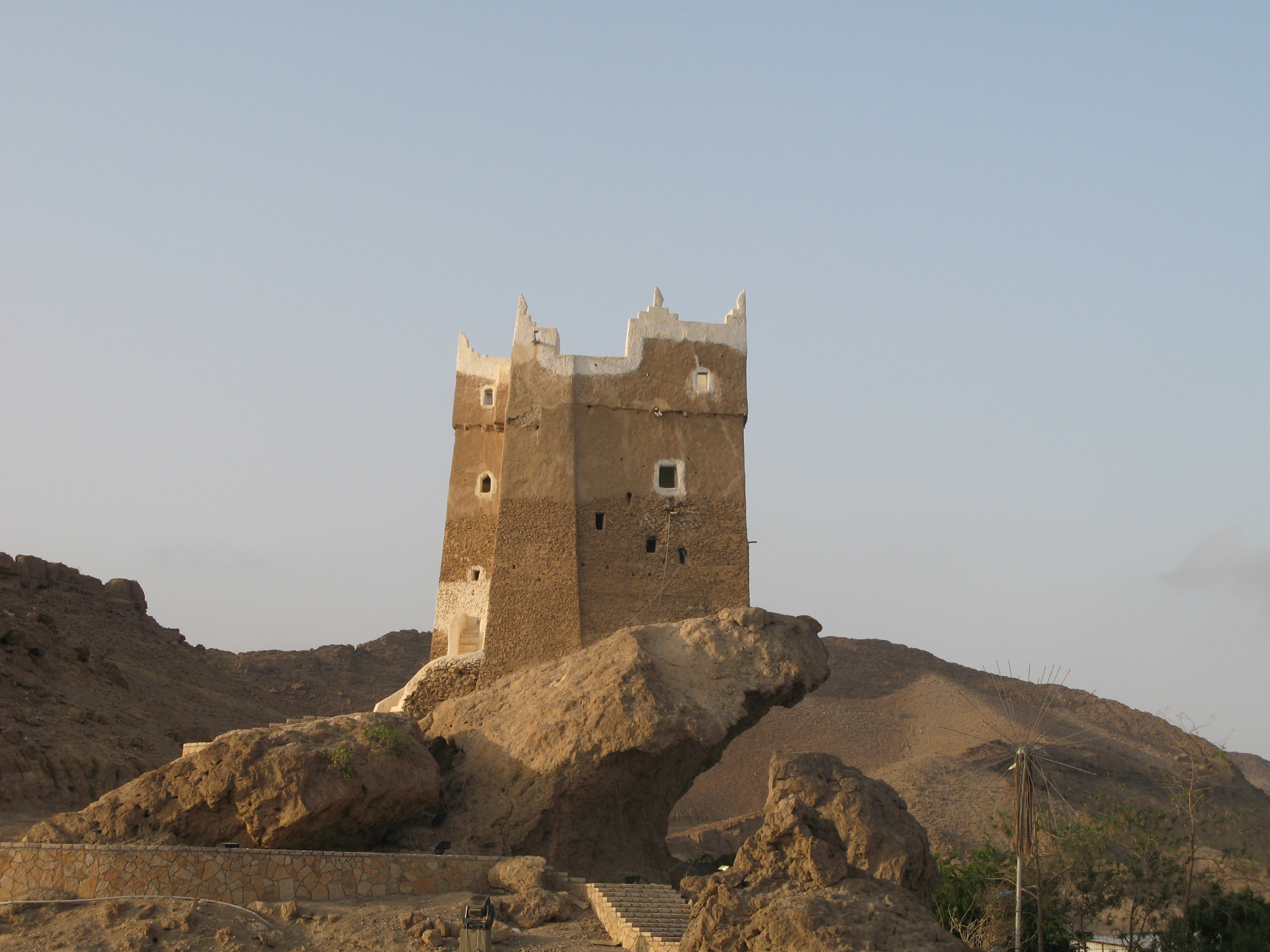
The fort in 2008

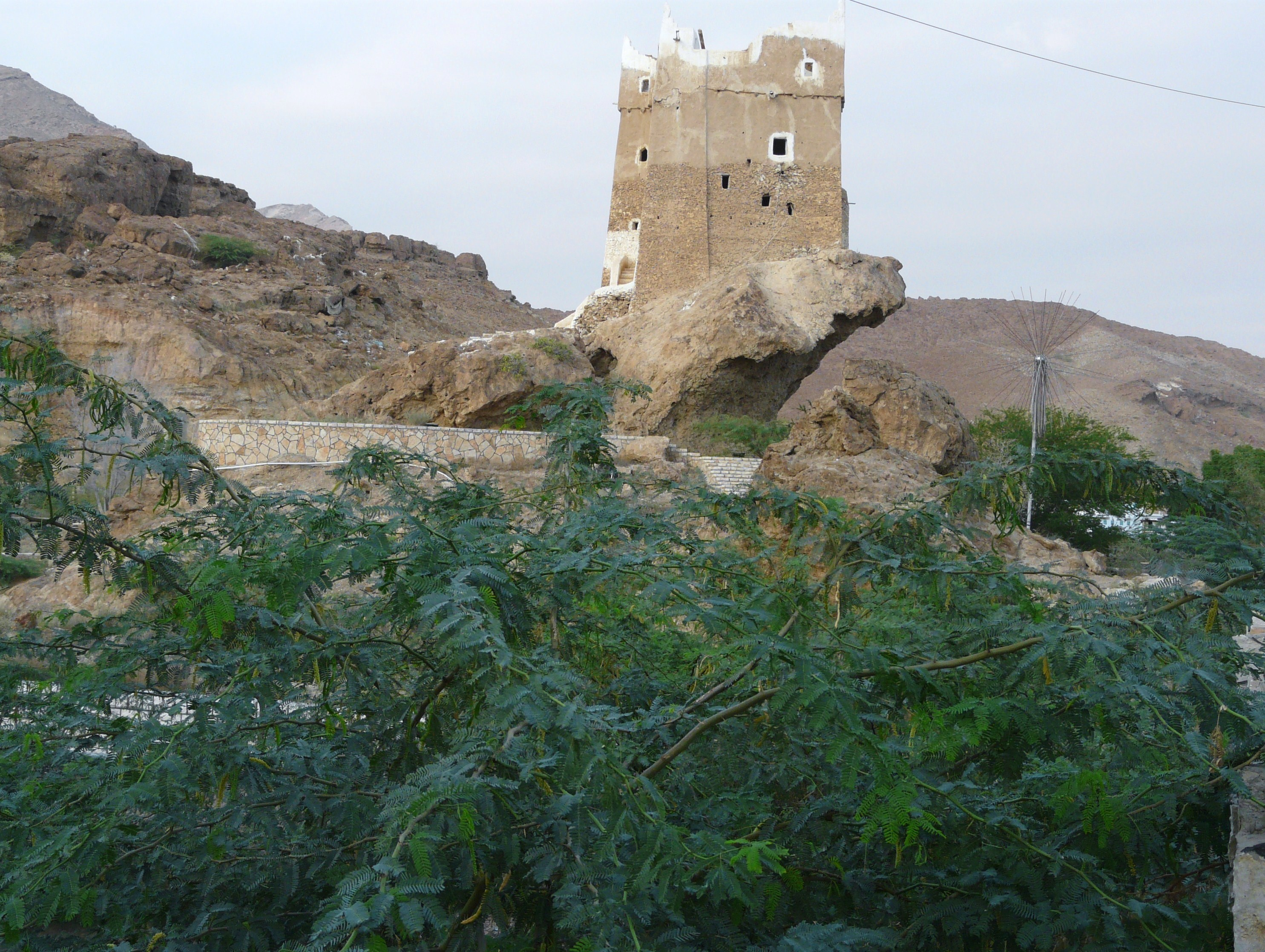
The fort in 2009

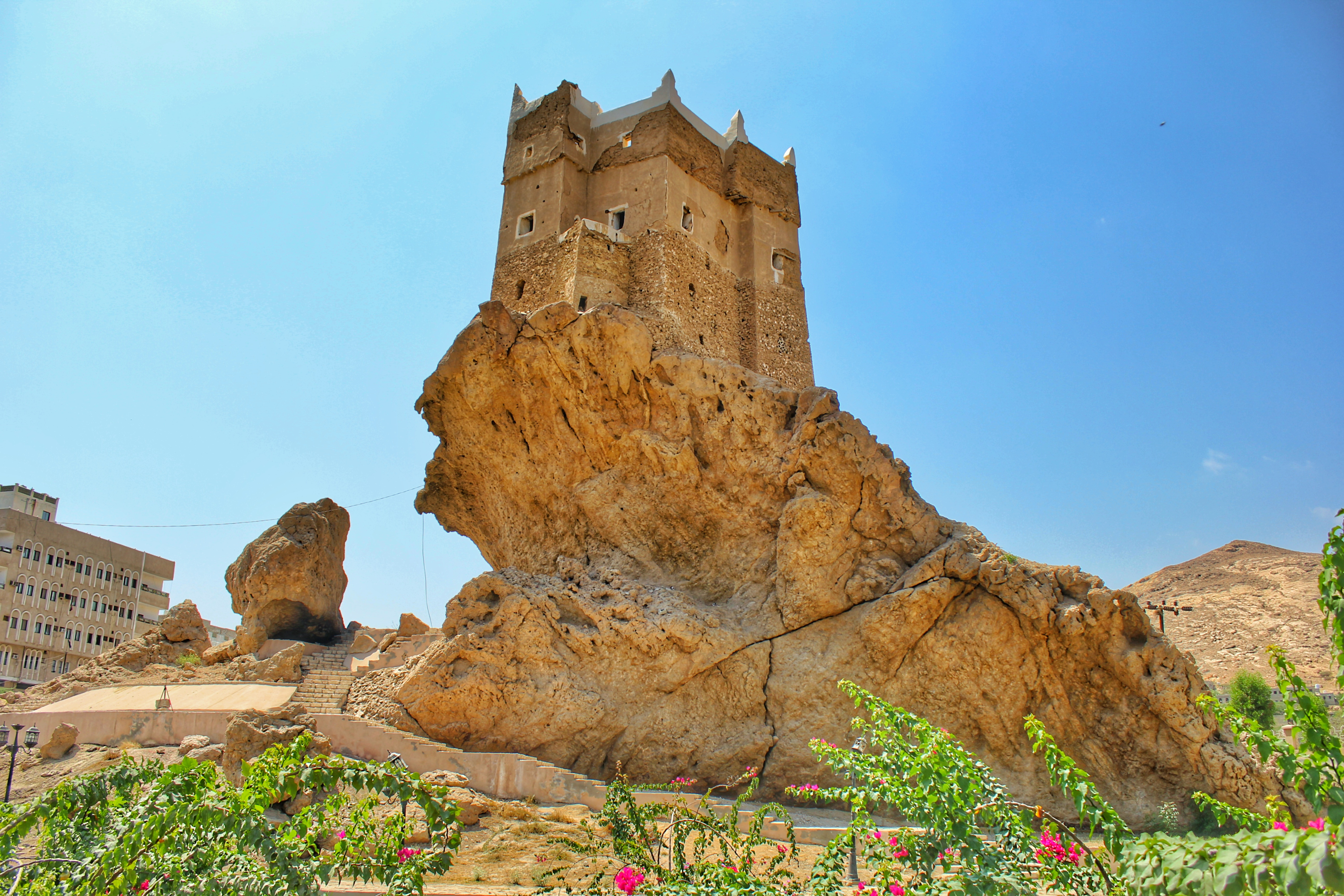
The fort in 2017
