= Mukalla =

Mukalla المكلا (Arabic)
- City
- Mukalla City District
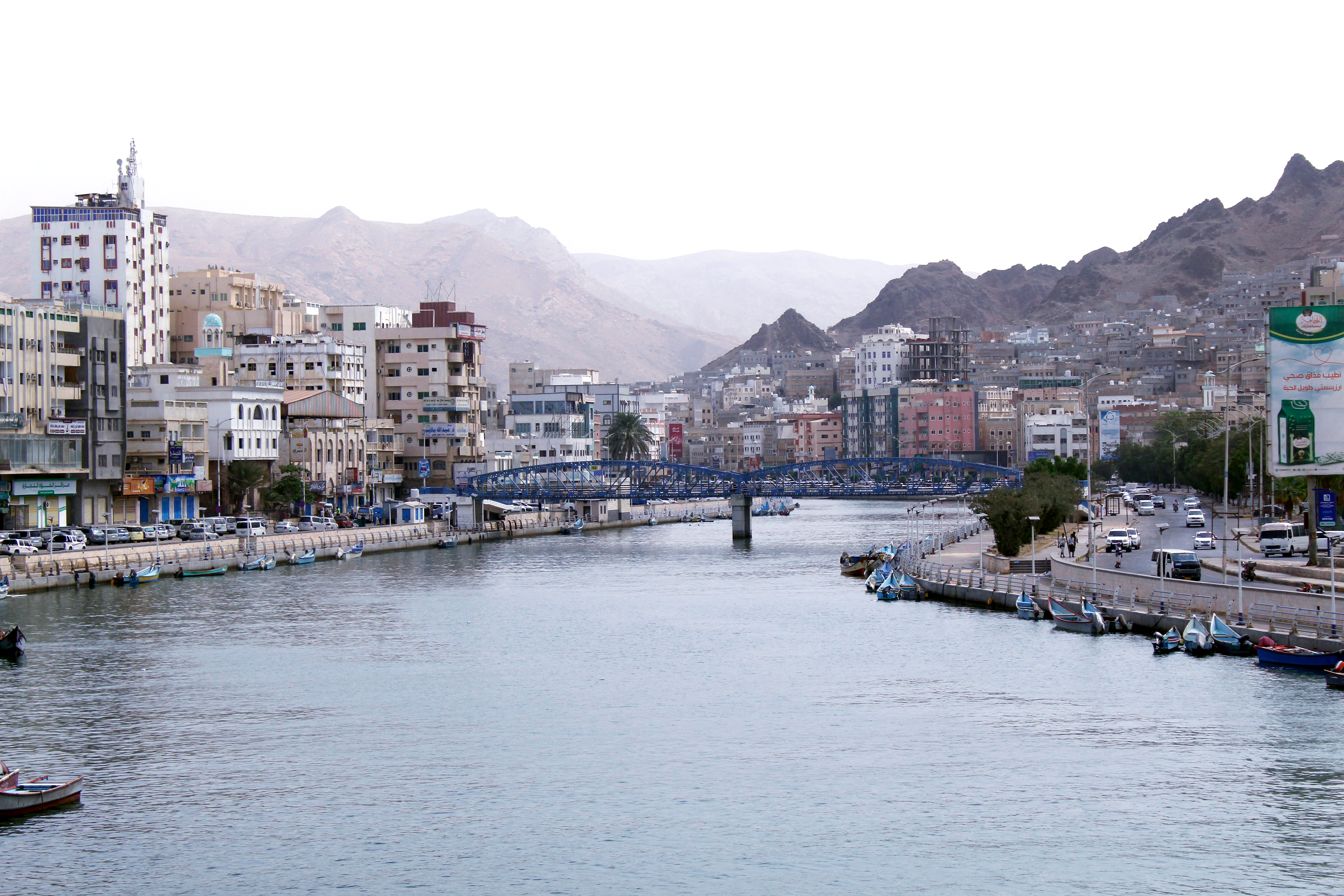
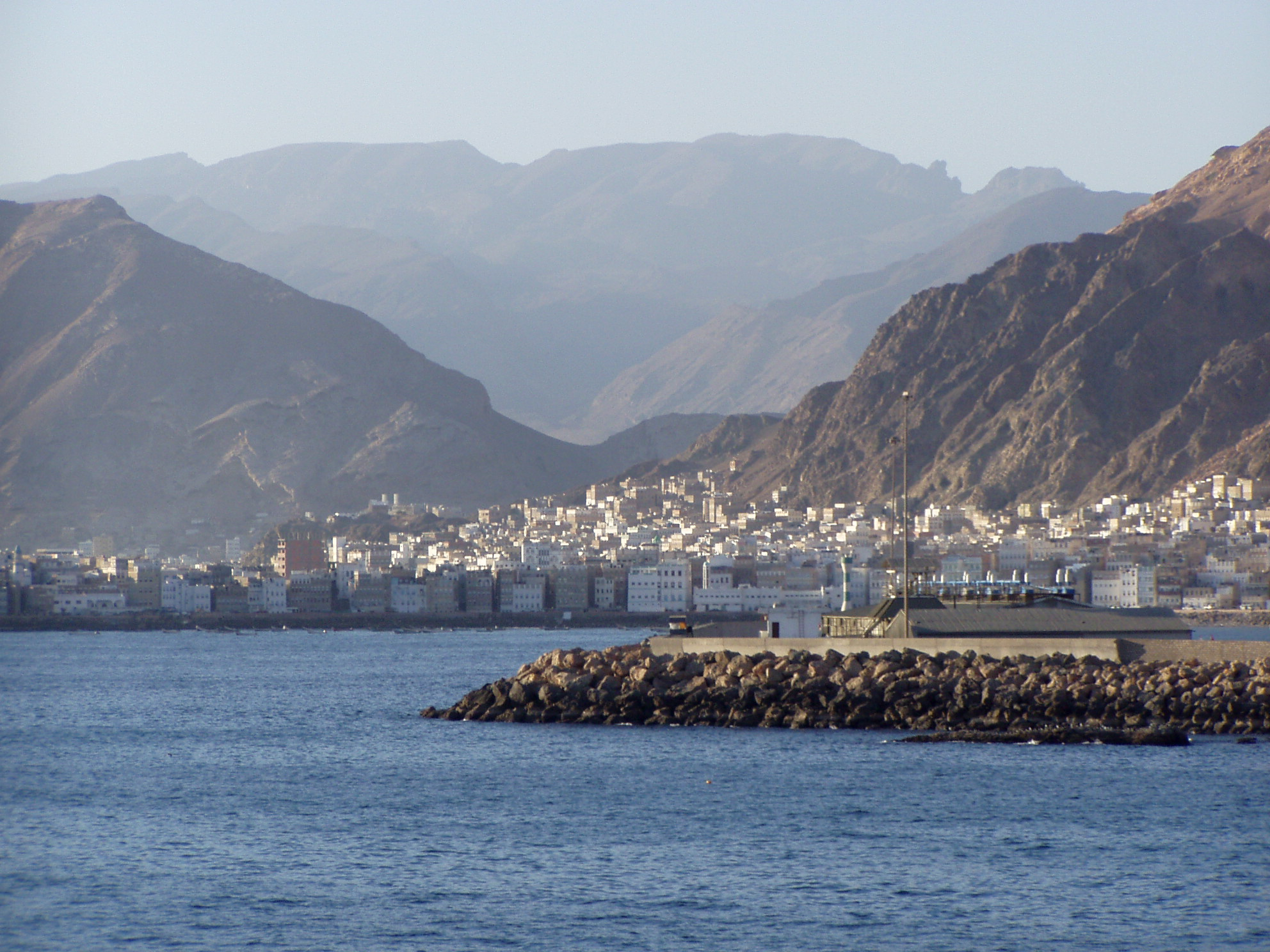
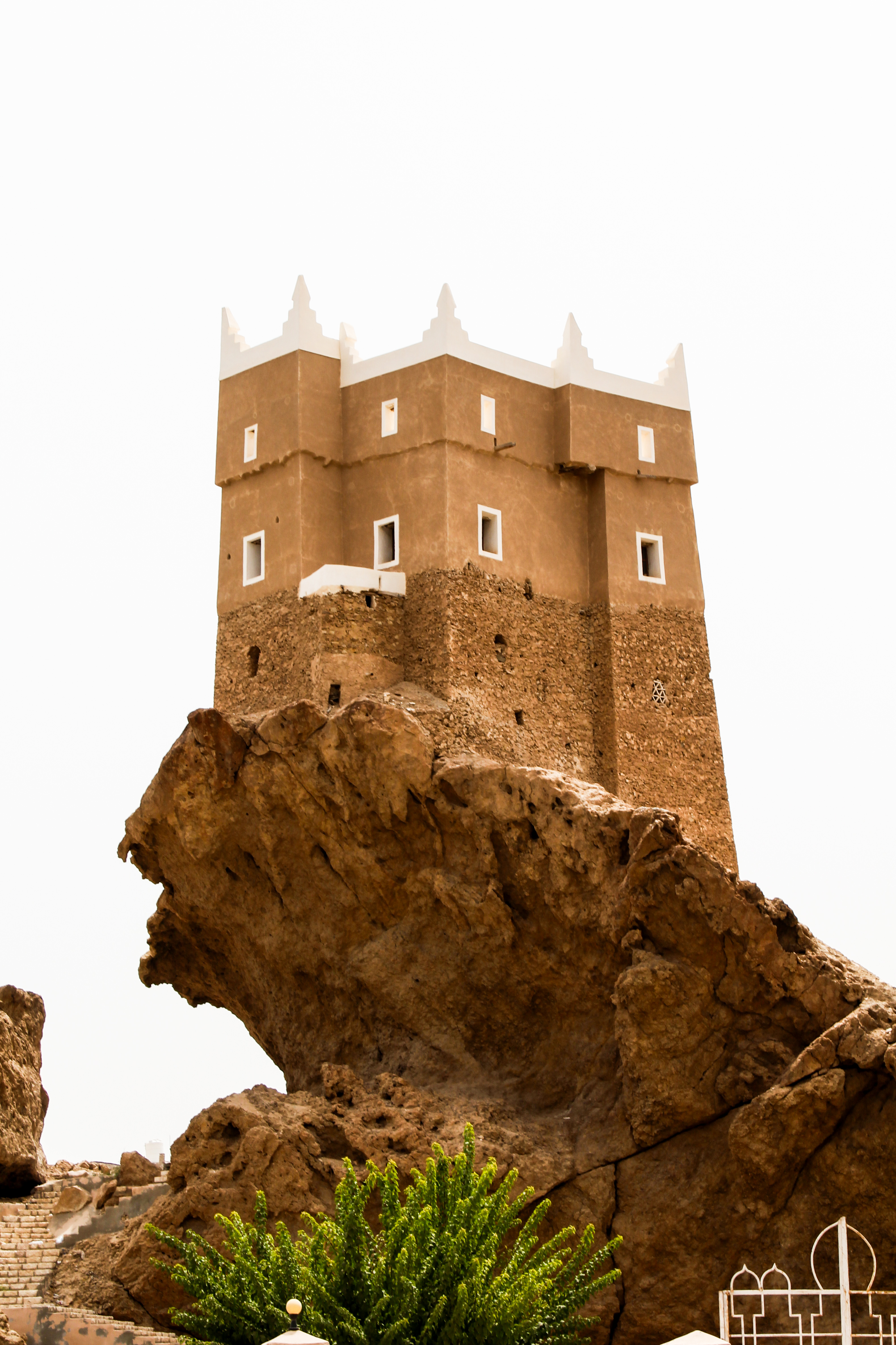
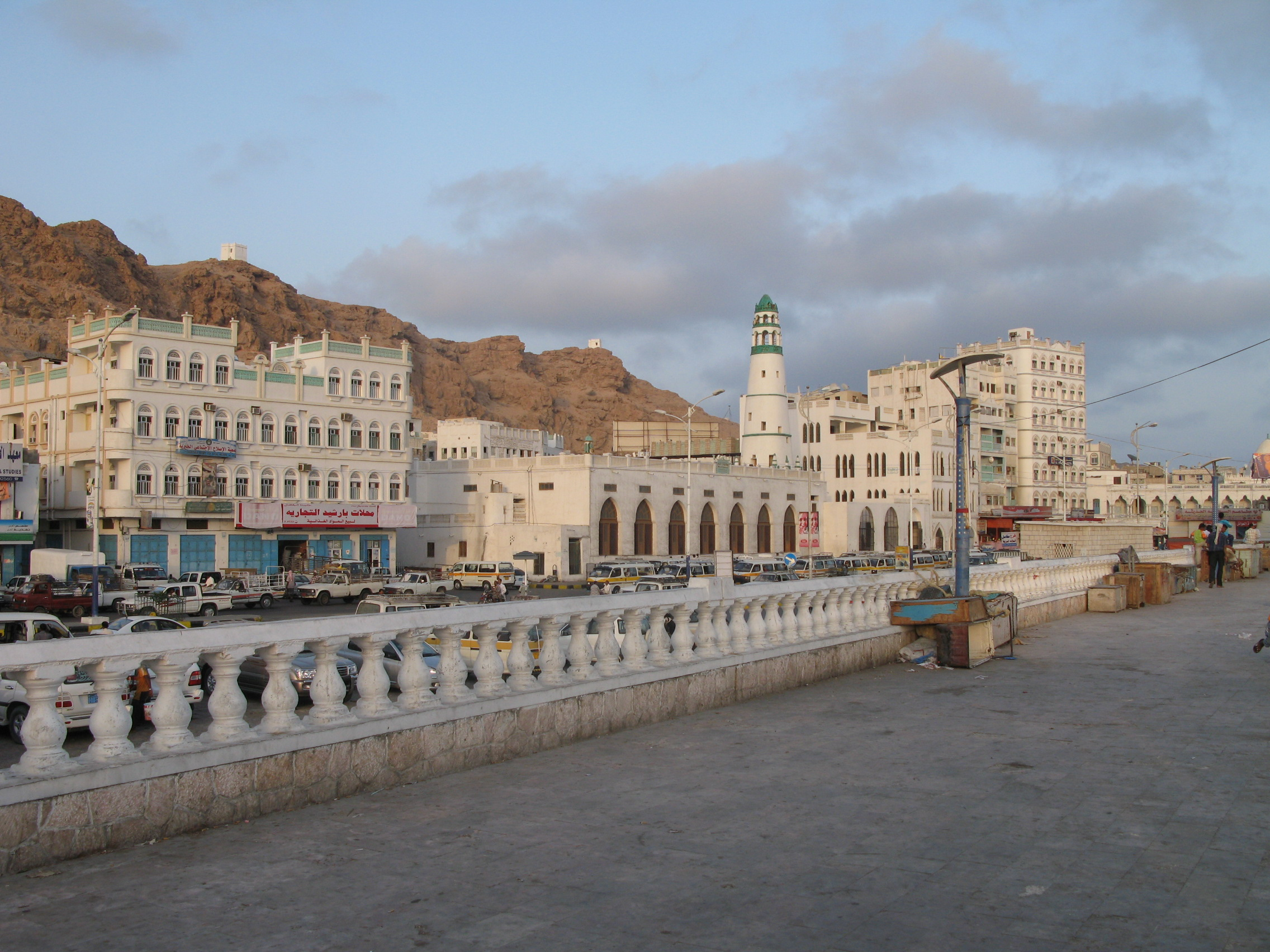
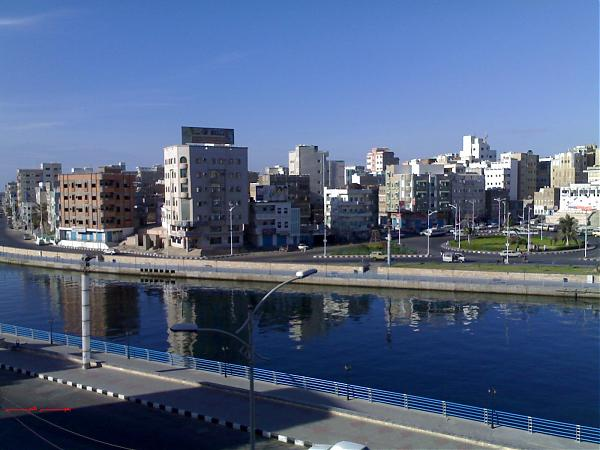
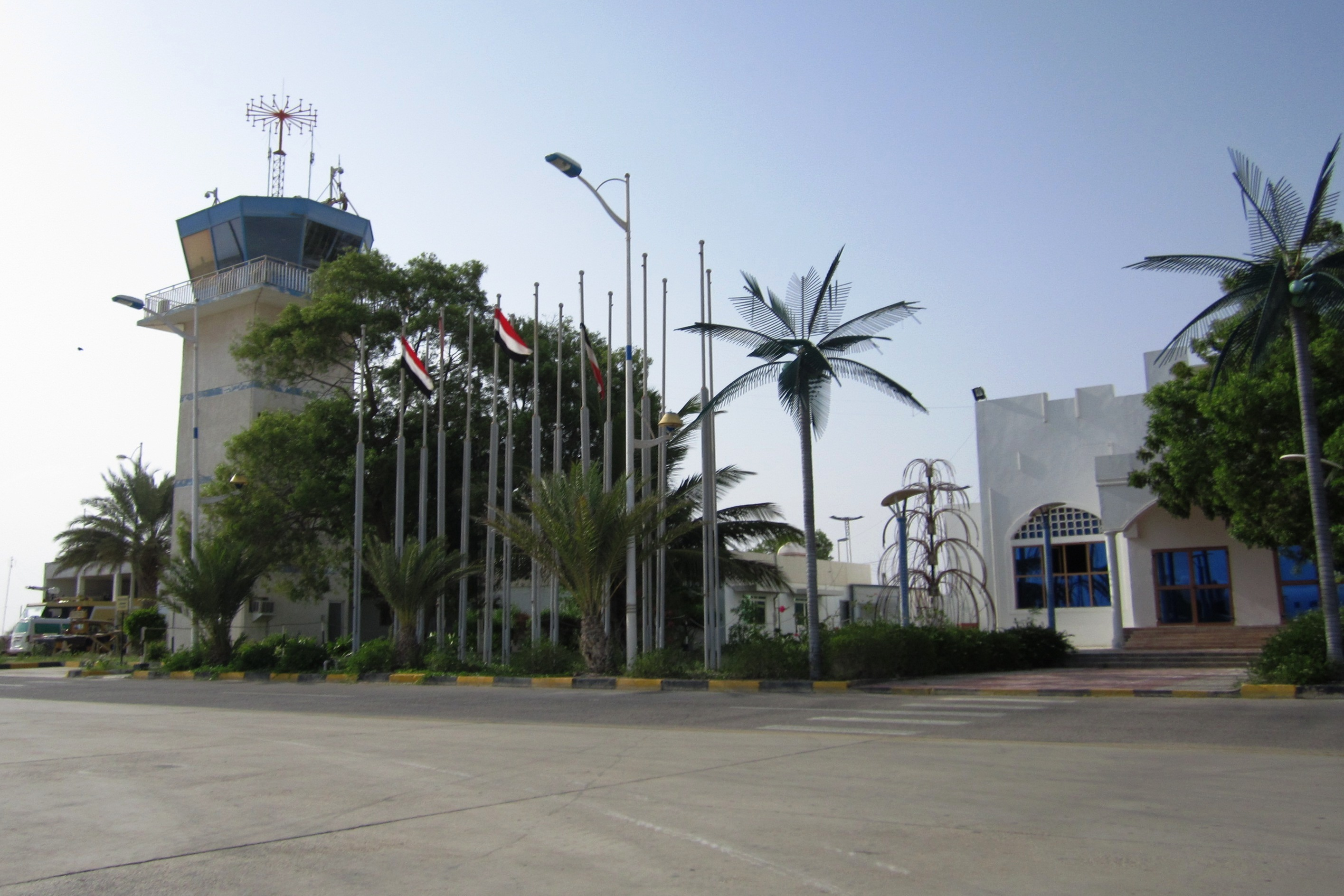
- Mukalla Creek Mukalla viewed from the old port Al-Gwayzi fort Al Rawda Mosque in the old city Mukalla Creek with Ash-Sharj in the background Riyan International Airport
- Nickname: Bride of the Arabian Sea
- Location in Yemen Mukalla (Middle East) Mukalla (West and Central Asia)
- Coordinates: 14°32′N 49°08′E
- Country: Yemen
- Region: Hadramaut
- Governorate: Hadramaut
- Founded as a fishing settlement in: 1035

Area
  - Total: 757.94 sq mi (1,963.05 km^{2})
- Elevation: 1,178 ft (359 m)

Population (2023)
  - Total: 594,951 ▲
  - Density: 784.960/sq mi (303.075/km^{2})
- Demonym: Mukallawi
- Time zone: UTC+3 (AST)
- Area code: +967-5

Mukalla, (Note: Arabic: ٱلْمُكَلَّا, romanized: Al-Mukallā) officially the Mukalla City District, (Note: Arabic: مديرية مدينة المكلا) is a seaport and the capital city district of Yemen's largest governorate, Hadhramaut. The city is in the southern part of the Arabian Peninsula on the Gulf of Aden, on the shores of the Arabian Sea, about 480 kilometres (300 miles) east of Aden.

It is the most important port city in the Hadhramaut region. Mukalla was also the capital of the Islamic Emirate of Yemen from 2015 to 2016. It is also the sixth-largest city in Yemen, with a population of approximately 595,000 as of 2023. The city is served by the nearby Riyan International Airport.

== Etymology ==
The current name "Mukalla" (المكلا) is derived from the Arabic verb "kala" (كلا), meaning "to preserve" or "to nurture." This reflects the city's historical role as a safe harbor and bustling port, providing shelter and nurturing trade in the region.

However, several other names and epithets have been associated with Mukalla throughout its history, each offering insights into its development and cultural significance:

- Al-Kheesa: This early name, meaning "bay" or "cove" in Arabic, highlights Mukalla's sheltered location and its early function as a fishing village.
- Bandar Yaqoub: This name comes from the saint Yaqoub bin Yusuf, a man who settled in the city around the 12th century AD. His shrine remains a significant local landmark.
- Bandar Omar: Named after a local figure, Omar bin Ali bin Sheikh Abu Bakr, who founded the Al-Rawda Mosque near Yaqoub's shrine.
- Bandar Al-Naqeeb: Attributed to Captain Salah bin Hamad Al-Kassadi, a prominent ruler from the Al-Kassad dynasty that governed Mukalla in the 18th century.
- Bandar Ghalib: This name emerged during the reign of Sultan Ghaleb bin Awad Al-Quaiti, who ruled the Hadhramaut region in the early 20th century.

== History ==
Mukalla is not far from Qana, the ancient principal Hadrami trading post between India and Africa, with incense producing areas in its hinterland.

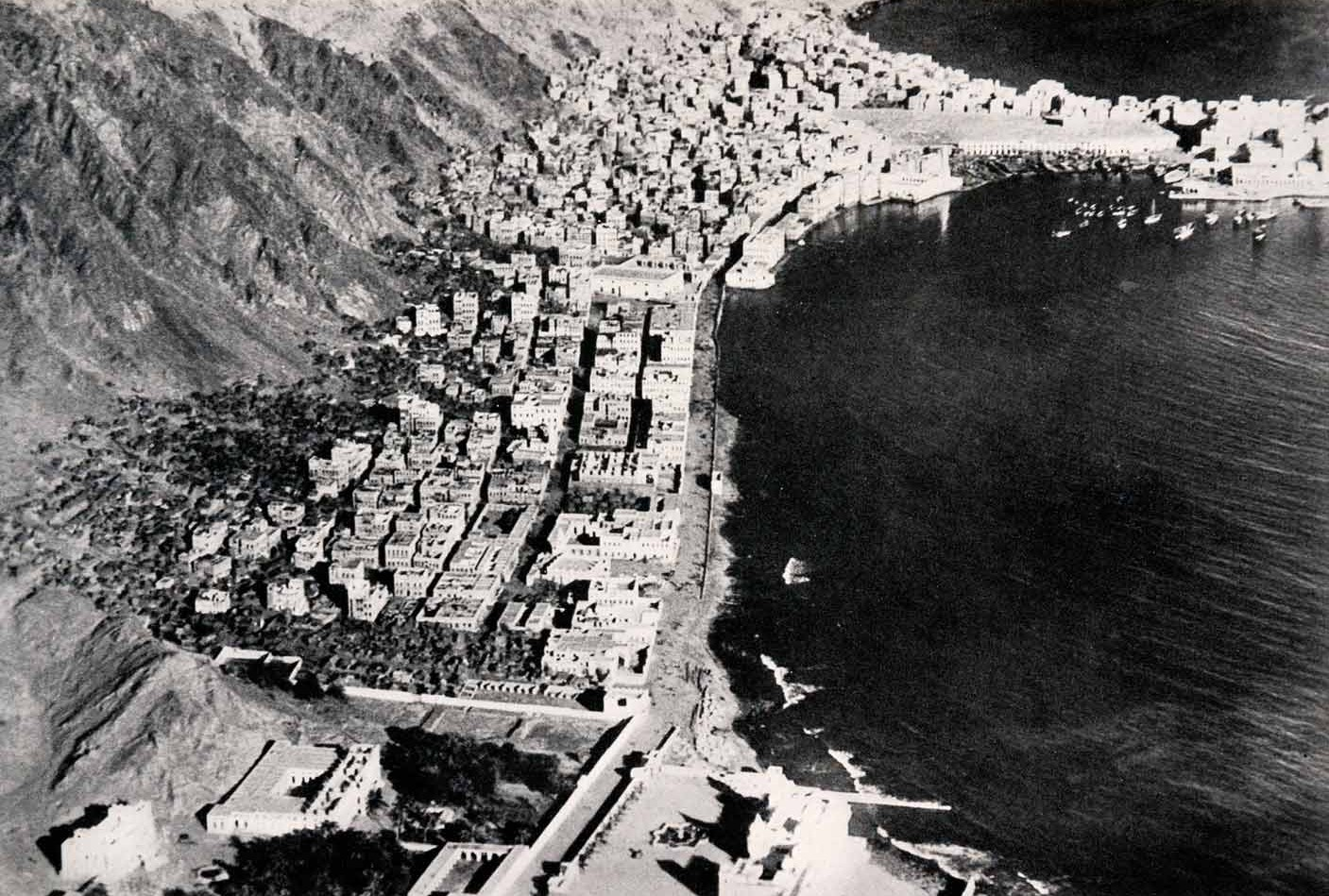
Aerial View of Mukalla, 1932

Mukalla was founded in 1035 as a fishing settlement. After witnessing a struggle for control by the Kathiri and Qu'aiti Sultanates in the 19th and 20th centuries, it became the capital of the Qu'aiti State of Hadhramaut. The Qu'aiti Sultanate was part of the Eastern Aden Protectorate until that merger, and a British Resident Advisor was stationed at Mukalla. The other major cities of the Sultanates were Ash-Shihr and Shibam.

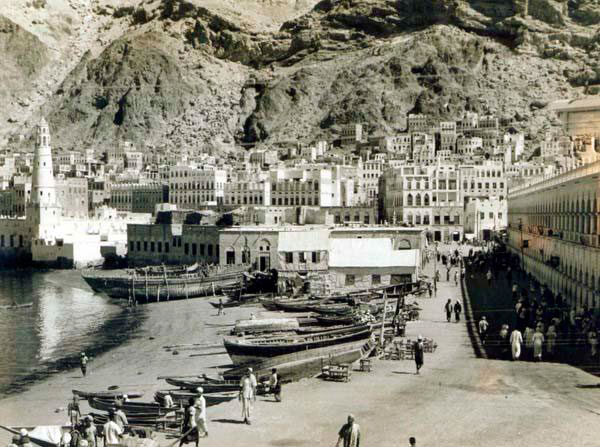
Mukalla in the 1950s

Captain Haines, a British officer who surveyed Yemen in the 1830s, described Mukalla as a town of 4,500 inhabitants with a significant trade in slaves. British explorers Theodore Bent and Mabel Bent used Mukalla several times in the 1890s to enter and exit the Wadi Hadhramaut:

“Our starting-point for the interior was Makalla, which is 230 miles from Aden, and is the only spot between Aden and Maskat which has any pretensions to the name of port. The name itself means 'harbour'… Here we were deposited in December 1893 by a chance steamer, one which had been chartered and on which for a consideration we were allowed to take passage. I took turns with the captain to sleep in his cabin, but there was nothing but the deck for the others.”

In 1967, Mukalla lost its status of capital city of the Qu'aiti Sultanate as it became a part of the communist People's Democratic Republic of Yemen and following the Yemeni unification in 1990, it became part of what is modern-day Yemen.

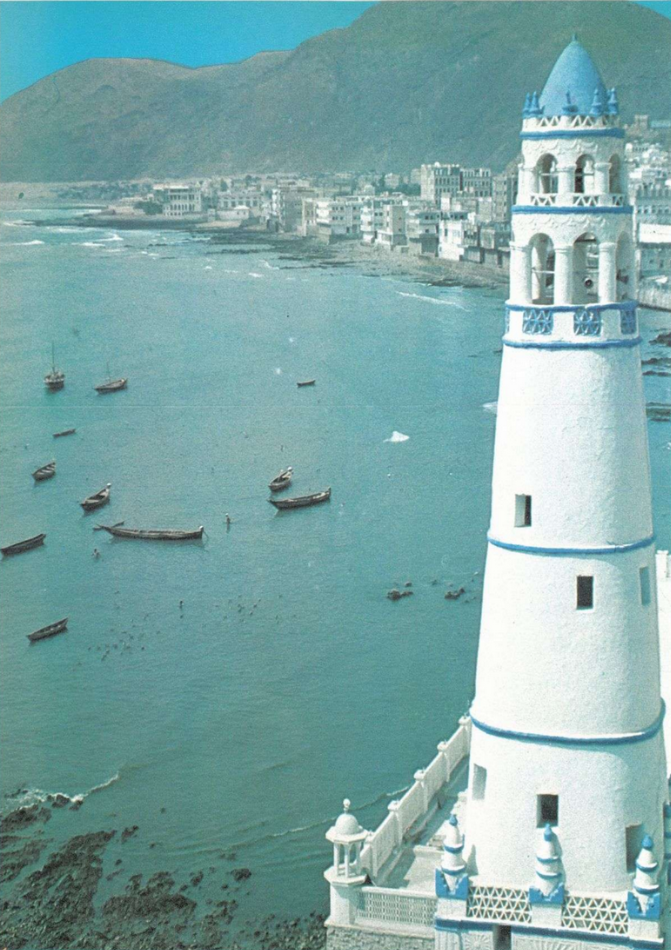
Mukalla in the 1970s

=== Yemeni Civil War ===
During the Yemeni Civil War, on 2 April 2015, Al-Qaeda in the Arabian Peninsula (AQAP) stormed the central prison, freeing hundreds of prisoners including two senior AQAP commanders. They attacked the central bank and seized 17 billion Yemeni riyals and 1 million U.S. dollars before taking control of the presidential palace in the city. During the Battle of Mukalla (2015), it was reported the entire city was under their control and they planned to establish an Islamic emirate in the wider Hadramaut region.

On 3 November 2015, Cyclone Chapala struck Mukalla and destroyed the city's waterfront.

Mukalla was recaptured from Al Qaeda (AQAP) on 25 April 2016, after 2,000 Yemeni and Emirati troops of the Saudi-led coalition advanced into the city, taking control of its port and airport and setting up checkpoints throughout the city.

==== 2025 port bombing ====
On 30 December 2025, a Saudi-led military coalition supporting Yemen's current government carried out an airstrike on two vessels docked at the port of Mukulla. According to the coalition, the two ships had delivered a large shipment of weapons and armored vehicles to the Southern Transitional Council (STC).

== Economy ==
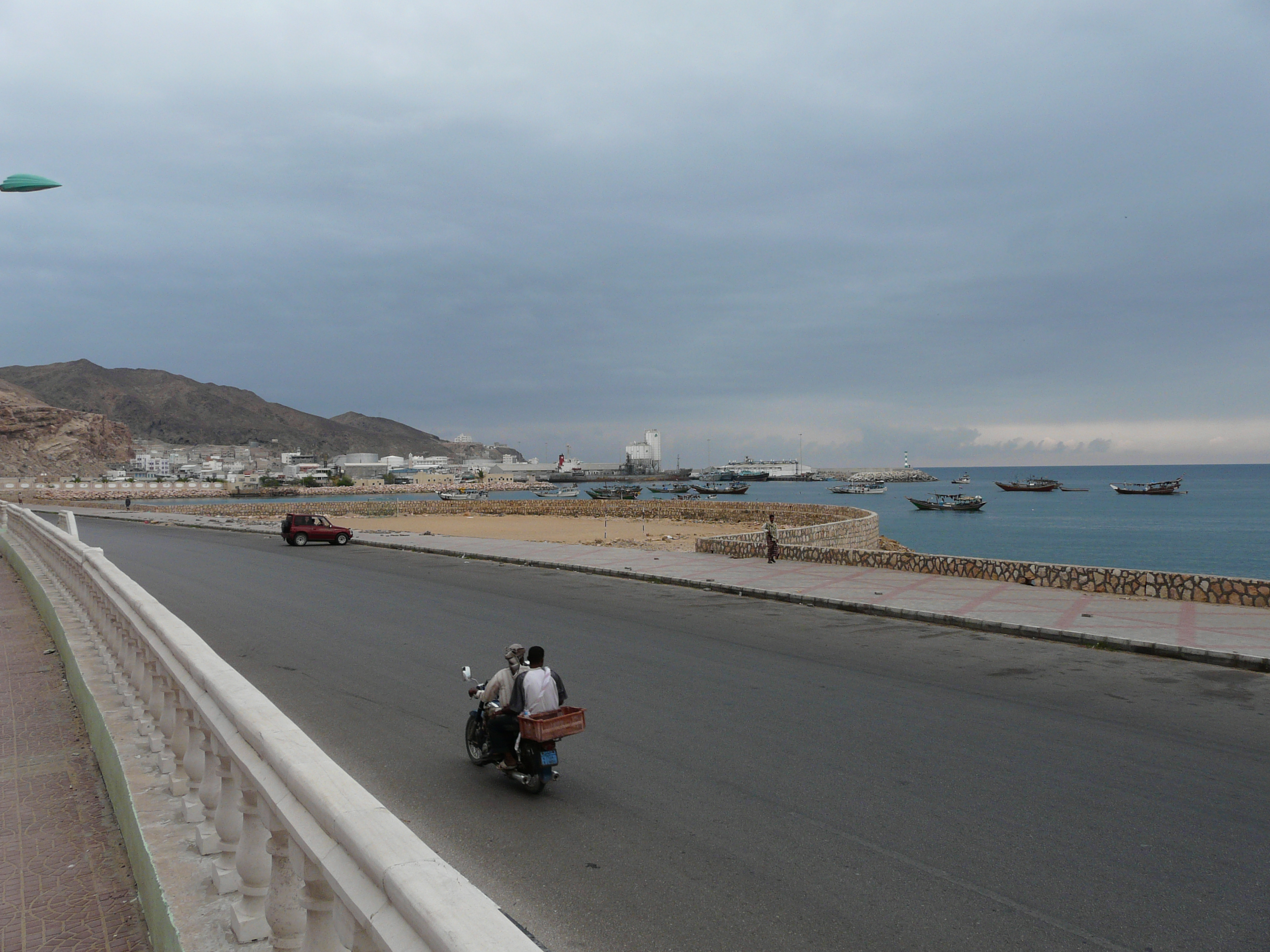
The old port of Mukalla, now moved to a different location

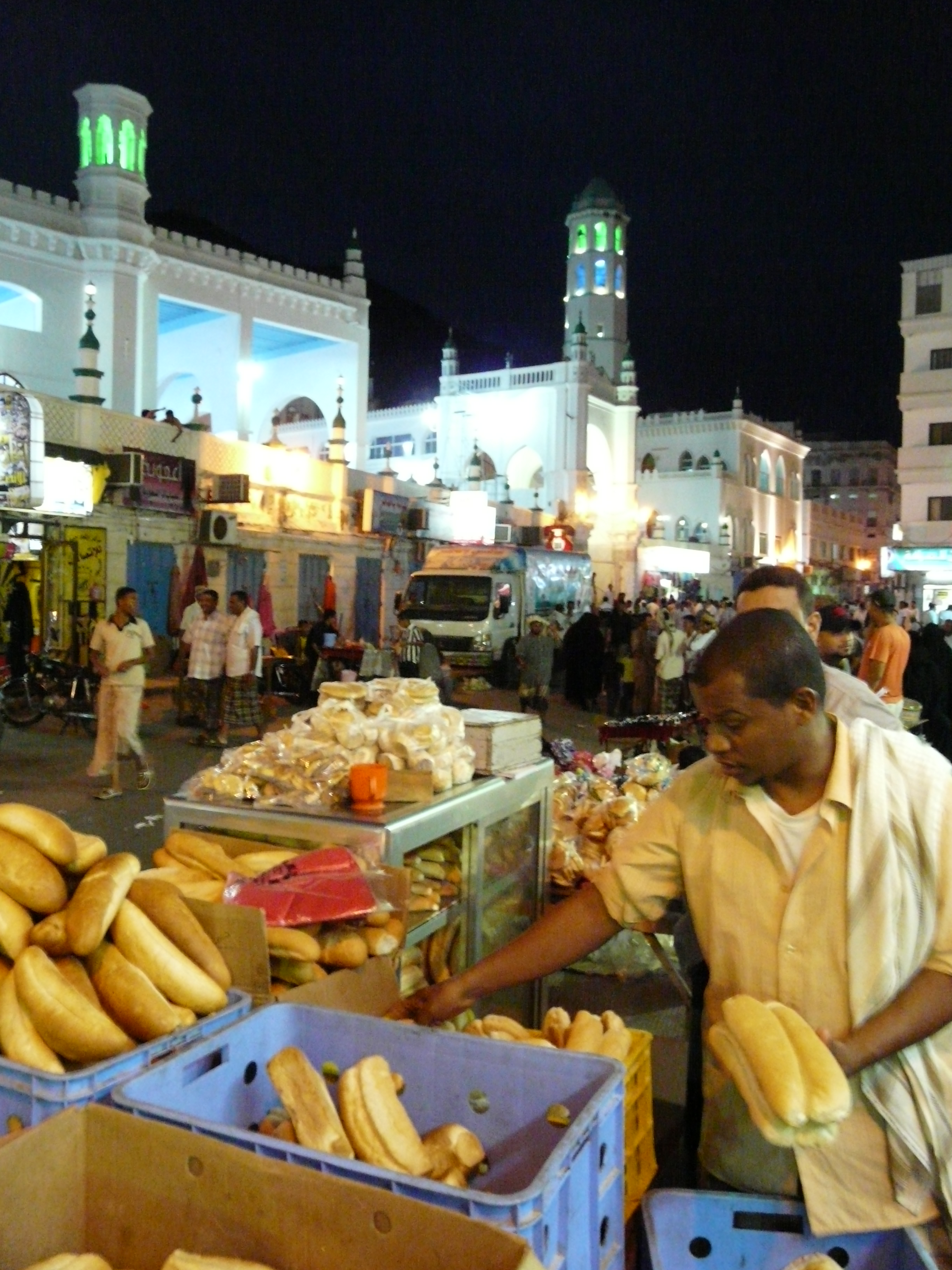
Trading bread next to the Omar grand mosque

The main market souq is one of the main commercial hubs of the city.

The port is located to the east of the town. The port is available for vessels with length less than 150 metres (490 feet), as per 2010 Pilot Book Pilot Directions. At the same time two vessels with the length 150 metres (490 feet) each and about 20 small fishing vessels can stay alongside in Mukalla port (fishing vessel moored alongside one to another). The port is fitted with an oil pipe line for tankers at the tanker dock, with oil storage tanks located adjacent to the port. A cement factory of the "RAYSUT" Omani-Yemeni company (Oman-Yemen company) located in the port and is able to ship cement in bulk on cement carriers.

== Sights ==
The old town is open for tourists. Sights include the royal palace of the sultan. Guard towers that were outposts surmount the vicinity of the old town. Nearby are Hadhramaut Mountains, such as that of Husn Ghuraf.

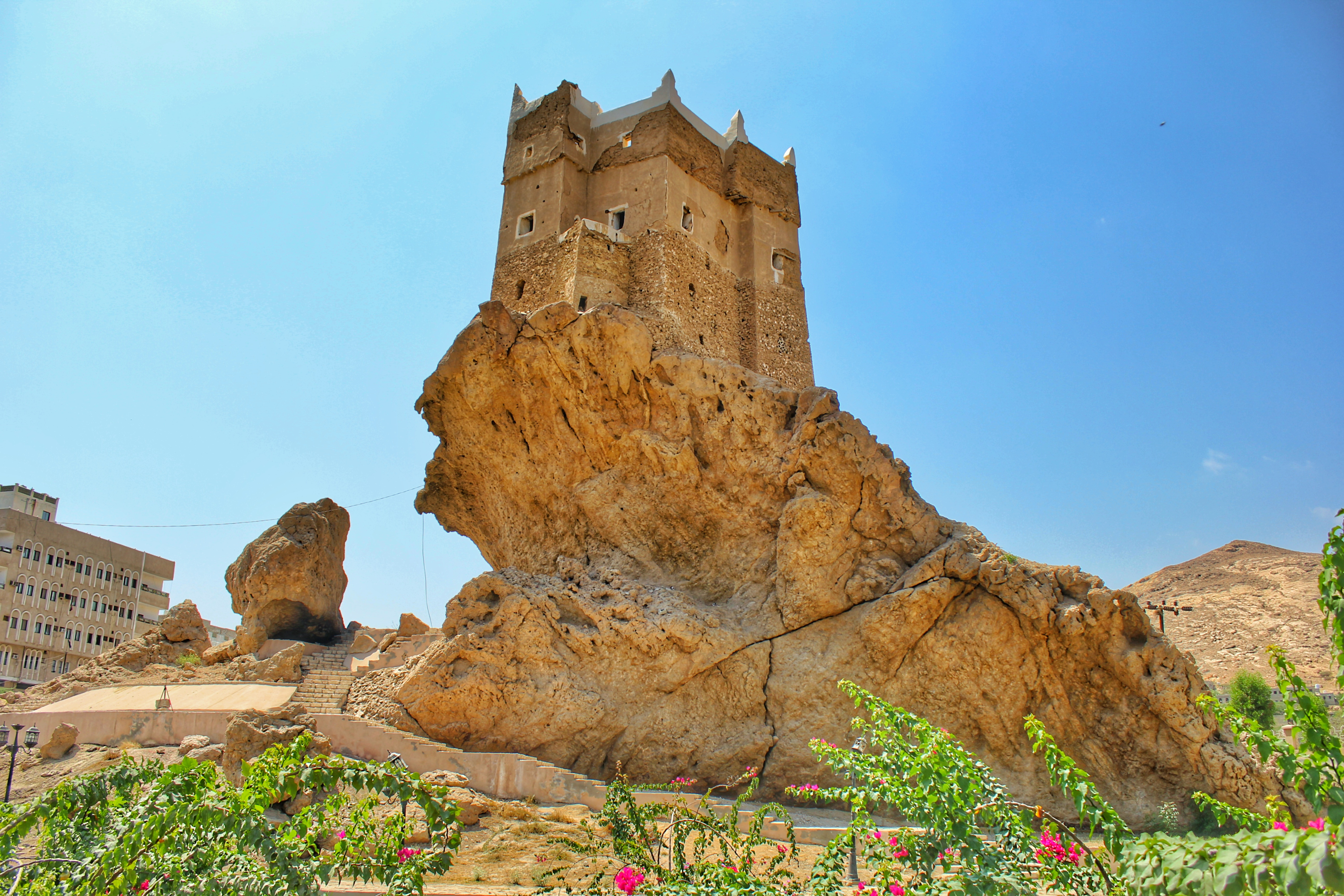
Al-Ghwayzi Fort at the base of the Hadhramaut Mountains

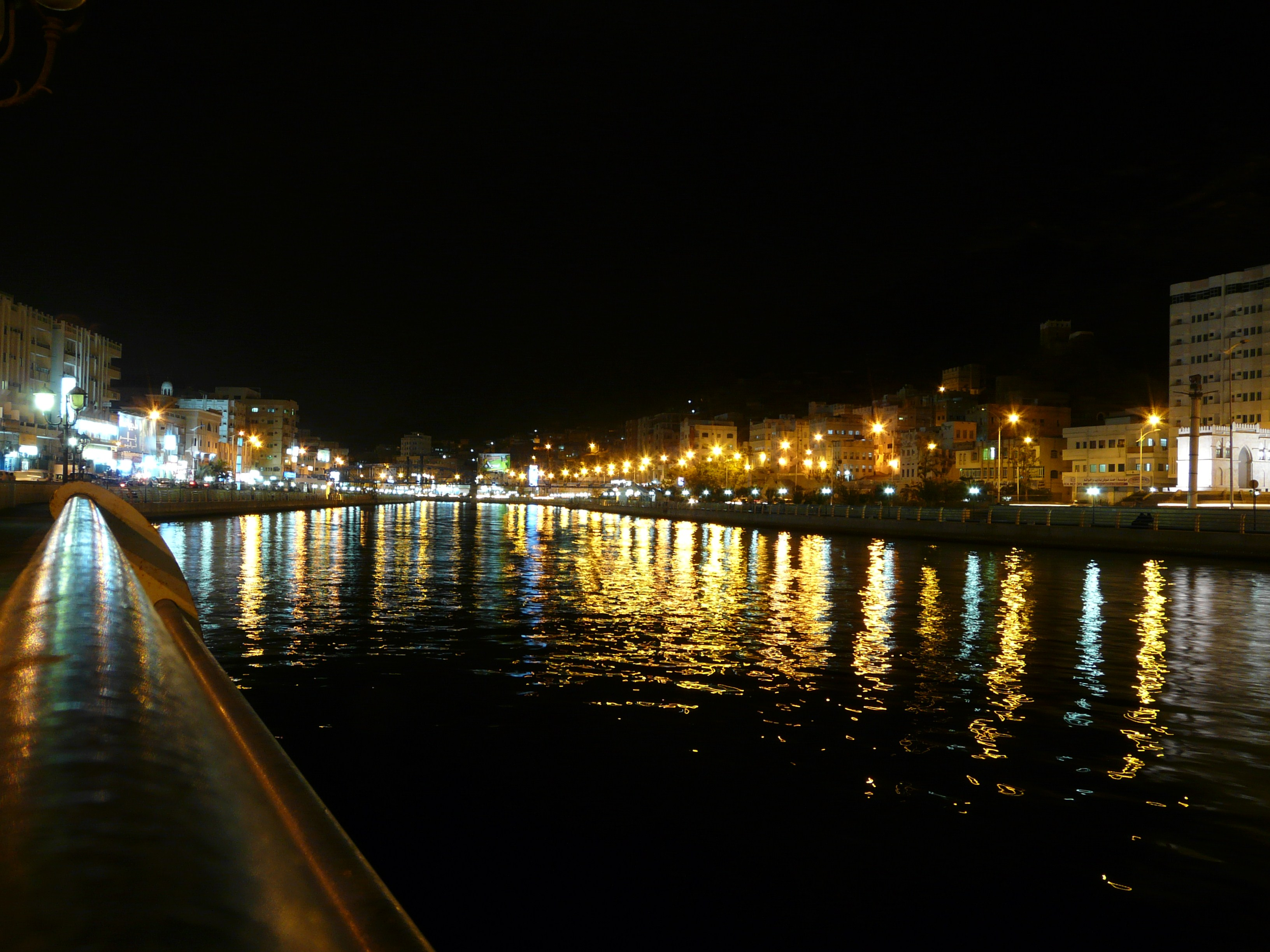
Al-Mukalla estuary at night

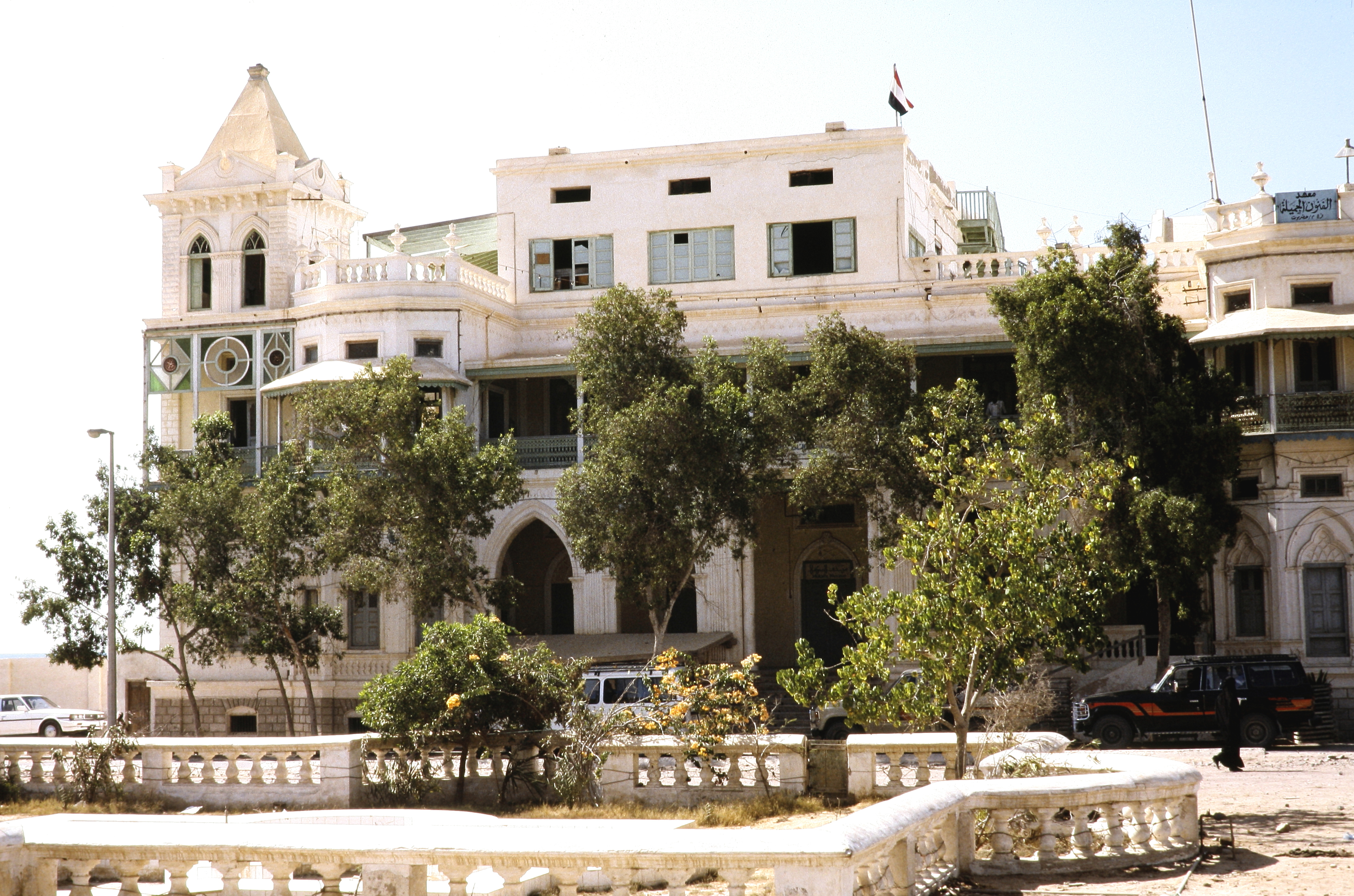
Qu'aiti sultan's palace, now a museum

== Education ==
The HUCOM (College of Medicine) of the Hadhramout University is located in Mukalla.

== Climate ==
Climate data for Mukalla (Riyan Airport)
Month	Jan	Feb	Mar	Apr	May	Jun	Jul	Aug	Sep	Oct	Nov	Dec	Year
Record high °C (°F)	32.6 (90.7)	33.3 (91.9)	36.1 (97.0)	38.0 (100.4)	40.0 (104.0)	43.9 (111.0)	38.2 (100.8)	37.2 (99.0)	37.0 (98.6)	38.9 (102.0)	38.2 (100.8)	32.9 (91.2)	43.9 (111.0)
Mean daily maximum °C (°F)	27.5 (81.5)	28.1 (82.6)	29.2 (84.6)	31.3 (88.3)	32.9 (91.2)	34.4 (93.9)	33.4 (92.1)	32.7 (90.9)	32.1 (89.8)	30.9 (87.6)	30.2 (86.4)	28.5 (83.3)	30.9 (87.6)
Daily mean °C (°F)	24.5 (76.1)	25.1 (77.2)	26.4 (79.5)	28.2 (82.8)	30.3 (86.5)	31.7 (89.1)	30.4 (86.7)	29.8 (85.6)	29.7 (85.5)	27.8 (82.0)	26.4 (79.5)	25.2 (77.4)	28.0 (82.4)
Mean daily minimum °C (°F)	21.0 (69.8)	21.5 (70.7)	23.1 (73.6)	24.7 (76.5)	27.7 (81.9)	28.5 (83.3)	26.9 (80.4)	26.4 (79.5)	26.8 (80.2)	24.2 (75.6)	22.1 (71.8)	21.4 (70.5)	24.5 (76.1)
Record low °C (°F)	13.9 (57.0)	15.2 (59.4)	14.4 (57.9)	17.2 (63.0)	20.6 (69.1)	22.2 (72.0)	20.0 (68.0)	19.4 (66.9)	21.7 (71.1)	17.3 (63.1)	16.1 (61.0)	15.1 (59.2)	13.9 (57.0)
Average precipitation mm (inches)	6.9 (0.27)	3.0 (0.12)	11.9 (0.47)	11.7 (0.46)	4.4 (0.17)	1.2 (0.05)	4.3 (0.17)	3.9 (0.15)	0.7 (0.03)	0.8 (0.03)	3.1 (0.12)	4.7 (0.19)	56.7 (2.23)
Average precipitation days (≥ 1.0 mm)	1.2	0.7	0.7	0.6	0.3	0.4	0.7	0.6	0.2	0.3	1.1	1.0	7.7
Average relative humidity (%)	62	61	64	68	70	67	65	65	72	68	62	60	66
Average dew point °C (°F)	15 (59)	15 (59)	17 (63)	21 (70)	22 (72)	22 (72)	21 (70)	21 (70)	22 (72)	20 (68)	17 (63)	15 (59)	19 (66)
Mean daily sunshine hours	7.5	7.6	9.5	9.6	11.9	12.2	12.0	11.7	9.8	9.8	9.8	8.5	10.0
Source 1: Deutscher Wetterdienst
Source 2: Time and Date (dewpoints, 2005–2015) Weather Atlas (sun hours)

== Notable residents ==
- Mujahid al-Haiqi, journalist
