= Yadhghat =

Village and archaeological site in Yemen

Coordinates: 14°55′40″N 50°04′07″E

Yadhghat is a village in Yemen and the archaeological site one kilometre east-southeast of it. It lies on the eastern edge of the valley of the Wadi Jerbah in the Ḥaḍramawt about twelve kilometres north of the port of Sharma, to which it was linked as a supplier of pottery.

The archaeological site, discovered in 2002, consists of about a dozen buildings visible above ground. The remaining walls of the settlement are just two courses of dry stone. The largest preserved buildings have a layout of three rooms. There is what appears to be a mosque with traces of a mihrab at the south of the site. The site was once much larger, but has been destroyed by agriculture and erosion. Today the site is very arid.

Yadhghat was the site of pottery production during the Middle Ages, between about 980 and 1150. Five heaps of refuse have been discovered. There is no trace of a built kiln, but evidence of firing ceramics in the open air. Pottery was handmade (not wheel-made) and unglazed redware decorated with incisions and paint. The paint may have been sourced from red clay mined nearby, where a shaft was found. Pottery made at Yadhghat has been found at the site of Jerbah two kilometres northwest, at the seaports of al-Shihr and Sharma, at the "palace" of al-Ḥamr al-Sharqiya in Dhofar, in the Wadi Masilah and as far afield as Raʾs al-Ḥadd. Sharma was probably the port through which Yadhghat ware were exported.

The end of the occupation of medieval Yadhghat is associated with the arrival of water kegs from the Dakhla Oasis at Sharma and Jerbah. Sharma may have been conquered by Egyptians who moved inland, forcing the abandonment of Yadhghat.

== Sources ==
- Mahoney, Daniel (2016). "Ceramic Production in the Central Highlands of Yemen During the Islamic Period". In Stephen McPhillips; Paul D. Wordsworth (eds.). Landscapes of the Islamic World: Archaeology, History, and Ethnography. University of Pennsylvania Press. pp. 129–142.
- Rougeulle, Axelle (2007a). "Ceramic Production in Medieval Yemen: The Yadhghat Kiln Site". Proceedings of the Seminar for Arabian Studies: 239–252.
- Rougeulle, Axelle (2007b). "A Medieval Trade Entrepôt at Khor Rori? The Study of the Islamic Ceramics from al-Ḥamr al-Sharqiya". In Alessandra Avanzini (ed.). A Port in Arabia Between Rome and the Indian Ocean, 3rd C. BC – 5th C. AD: Khor Rori Report 2. Rome: "L'Erma" di Bretschneider. pp. 645–667.
