= Al-Aidarous gate =

Coordinates: 14°45′40″N 49°36′27″E

al-Aidarous Gate
- سدة العيدروس
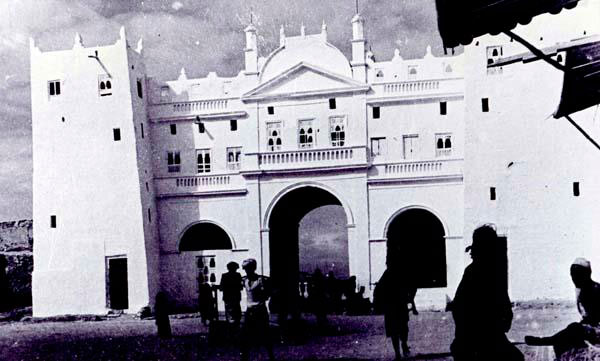
- Old image of the gate

General information
- Location: Ash-Shihr, Yemen
- Year built: 1888

Al-Aidarous Gate, also known Sidat Al-Aidrous, is one of the historical sites in the city of Ash-Shihr in Yemen. It was estimated to be built between 1868 and 1888. It constituted a unique example for the Islamic gates in Hadhramaut. It was named after Imam Sheikh al-Aidarous to commemorate him and the nearby al-Aidarous Mosque.

The gate consists of three stories—The first story includes the entrance, which is about 2.5 meters wide and 4.5 meters high. This entrance is closed by a thick wooden door with two equal leaves, each of which is (1.5*3 meters). Its facade is covered with iron sheets fixed with huge nails. Its entrance is closed by a thick wooden door of two equal sides. The second story contains a wide room on the top of the gate at the middle of the building. In the two suites surrounding it, there are four rooms and two bathrooms. Every suite consists of two bedrooms and a bathroom. The third story contains two surveillance rooms, in addition to a wall revolving around the roof at a height of one and a half meters. Today, the gate building is used as a media department and an office for the Antiquities, Museums and Manuscripts Authority.

== See also ==
- Yemen Gate
