= Sharma (medieval) =

Medieval port in Yemen

- Location within Yemen
- Coordinates: 14.760833°N 49.606944°E

Sharma or Sharmah (Arabic: شرمة) was a medieval trading port in Ḥaḍramawt (South Arabia) on the Gulf of Aden. It was deeply involved in the Indian Ocean trade and was "one of the busiest harbours of the Indian Ocean" until its abrupt abandonment around 1180. Although known from texts, the location of the settlement was only discovered in 1996. Archaeological excavations began in 2001. They have revealed a large, heavily fortified port founded around 980 by merchants from Siraf on the Persian Gulf.

Sharma had a small permanent population of merchants and soldiers and served mainly as a transshipment point between East Africa and India. Nevertheless, its site possesses the richest assortment of Chinese ceramics from its period in the Islamic world.

== Geography ==
Sharma was located on the Raʾs Sharma promontory about 50 kilometres (31 mi) east of al-Shiḥr on a plain situated between two plateaus overlooking a sandy beach. It possessed a deep anchorage. There is another isolated plateau (Arabic jawl) at the tip of Raʾs Sharma. The settlement faces the west. The geography of the site makes it easily defensible, since the continental plateau rises 30 metres (98 ft) above the plain, which is accessible via two narrow wadis. The plain itself is 5–7 metres (16–23 ft) higher than the beach and accessible only by two pathways, while the isolated plateau west of the settlement was accessible by only one.

Sharma was an isolated settlement, over 10 kilometres (6.2 mi) from the nearest oasis or village. It has limited freshwater. The settlement had four cisterns and three wells, however, and may have cultivated the plateau.

== History ==
Neolithic artefacts have been recovered from the plateau at the tip of Raʾs Sharma. Remains of a shell midden have also been found. Around the start of the first millennium, Sharma was probably a seasonal settlement. A Himyarite structure, probably a temple, has been found on the eastern plateau. Pre-Islamic artefacts from India, Oman and Persia have been recovered from the site, suggestive of a flourishing trade during Himyarite times. No evidence of Himyarite settlement beyond the temple has been found. The main period of settlement was the tenth through twelfth centuries, and that settlement, by far the most extensive in the history of the site, was created from scratch.

Sharma is mentioned in three works of medieval Islamic geography. Writing in 985, al-Muqaddasī records that Sharma and Lasʿā (al-Shiḥr) were dependencies of the Ziyadid rulers of Zabīd on the Red Sea coast. About 1150, al-Idrīsī wrote that Sharma and Lasʿā on the coast of Ḥaḍramawt were stopovers on the sailing route from Aden to Mirbāṭ and were about one day apart. Around 1300, al-Dimashqī mentions Sharma for the last time, noting only that it and al-Shiḥr were the two harbours of Ḥaḍramawt. They operated independently of one another.

The foundation of Sharma should probably be linked to the earthquake that destroyed the Persian port of Siraf in 977. That Sharma was not founded by locals is certain. Local tribesmen lacked the connections to create a flourishing port ex nihilo and the wealth to defend it from the existing port of al-Shiḥr, which would certainly have opposed it. The most likely candidates for the founders are émigrés from Siraf. The extension of the Shiite Buyid emirate into Iraq (945) and of the Shiite Fatimid caliphate into the Red Sea may have provided propitious circumstances for the founding of a new trade emporium in southern Arabia. Likewise, the reemergence of the Mediterranean Sea as a major hub of international trade may have drawn merchants away from the Persian Gulf and towards the Red Sea. The error of al-Muqaddasī in placing Sharma on the Red Sea is best explained by the port's having been only just founded at the time of his writing.

The history of Sharma has been divided into six phases. The third phase is characterized by the construction of the main defensive wall. This may be linked to the campaigns of the Sulayhids to extend their authority into Ḥaḍramawt around 1063. It also corresponds with the fall of the Buyids. In 1053, too, the Seljuks had raided Sohar in Oman. The high point of Sharma was the fourth phase, roughly the second half of the eleventh century. The decline of Sharma from about 1150 may be linked to the rise of its obvious rivals, al-Shiḥr and Mirbāṭ, or to the aggressive policy of the Persian port of Kish. The final abandonment of the port may have come about only after an Ayyubid assault in 1180.

Sharma was partially occupied again in the late thirteenth century into the early fourteenth (the time of al-Dimashqī). This is considered the sixth phase of medieval Sharma. It was partially re-occupied a third and last time in the seventeenth through nineteenth centuries.

== Archaeology ==
The settled area of Sharma encompassed five hectares. Despite the site's origin in a single act of foundation, there is little evidence of planning. Buildings are widely separated and the areas between them show signs of being used for refuse (potsherds and animal bones). The only hint of urbanism is a lane with small buildings on either side that may have been a suq (market). The port did produce glass. One (non-pottery) kiln has been identified as well as glass slag. There were two cemeteries located outside the town itself, one to the northeast and another to the southwest. These have not been excavated by archaeologists.

Sharma was a less a city than a fortified warehouse complex. Its buildings were mostly storehouses, perhaps each associated with a particular good or merchant. Its population was small, mainly administrators, soldiers and craftsmen.

=== Buildings ===
One hundred buildings have been identified by archaeologists within the settlement. Their stone foundations or basement walls survive, but the earthen (probably mudbrick) superstructures have long since disappeared. It is thus impossible to determine whether buildings had one or two storeys except in the case of the thickest foundations walls, which almost certainly supported two storeys. The building types have no known equivalents among medieval Ḥaḍramī architecture, but are similar to ancient Sabaean types from the same region. The main large building type has an east–west hallway with three rooms to the north and three to the south. The buildings are devoid of architectural decoration.

Sharma was originally protected on the landward side by an earthen and stone wall 2.1 metres (6.9 ft) thick stretching from one plateau to the other. At some point, this wall was destroyed or eroded and rebuilt. At some point, the entire settlement might have been enclosed by walls, but this is not certain. Atop the plateau to the west of the settlement there was a citadel comprising two forts on the accessible eastern half separated by a gated wall 1.1 metres (3.6 ft) thick from another fort built atop the ruins of the Himyarite temple. This last fort overlooked the harbour. It has been suggested that the forts may have been no more than watchtowers or lighthouses.

Sharma had one mosque that was rebuilt twice. The original mosque was little more than a single room 25 square metres (270 sq ft) in area. The second mosque was built on top of the demolished original. It was 52 square metres (560 sq ft) with a front courtyard (ṣaḥn). The third mosque is badly preserved, but it too was built over the earlier mosques. It had an interior area of 197 square metres (2,120 sq ft). The mosque sat at the edge of the plain overlooking the beach and was visible from the sea.

=== Pottery ===
Only a few coins have been recovered from Sharma. Other objects include combs, weights, pearls and kohl sticks. Pieces of incense and small glass beads are common, but most significant is the large and varied corpus of imported ceramic and glass vessels. Sharma has the "richest" collection of imported Chinese ceramics "ever found on an Islamic site" of the eleventh century. Some Chinese styles found at Sharma have not been found at any other archaeological site in the Islamic world. Of the recovered pieces of pottery from the site, 4.3% are Chinese, 5.0% are glazed earthenware and 90.7% are unglazed. Pottery may have been produced at Sharma, but no evidence of its production has come to light. The nearest known kiln was at Yadhghat about 12 kilometres (7.5 mi) to the north and it seems to have provided some pottery to the port.

Among the types of Chinese pottery found at the site are qingbai and Ding porcelains and Yue and Yao stonewares. Objects from ten different Chinese kiln sites have been identified: Changsha, Dingzhou, Ganzhou, Jianyang, Jingdezhen, Jizhou, Tong'an, Xicun, Yaozhou and Yue. The earliest Chinese pieces were fired in the late ninth century and the latest in the early twelfth, but eleventh-century firings predominate.

The glazed earthenware of Sharma comes mostly in three sgraffiato styles imported from Persia. It is well known from Siraf and Tis in Persia and from Shanga in East Africa. In Siraf, its prevalence is associated with the city's decline. It was produced in Persia between the eleventh and thirteenth centuries. Earlier types of pottery, such as Persian lusterware, and later, such as Seljuk fritware, are rare compared to the sgraffiato. There are a few examples of what might be the earliest glazed ware produced in South Arabia at Aden and Zabīd, or else evidence of the thirteenth-century occupation.

The unglazed wares found at Sharma are varied and distinctive. Besides the probable local production and those from Yadhghat, there are types from India, Sindh, the Persian Gulf, the Red Sea coast and the Swahili coast. Egyptian kegs (of a type known as siga) have been found dating to the late twelfth century, perhaps indicative of Ayyubid encroachment. The number of African imports is unusually high: 16.2% of all unglazed ceramics and perhaps as much as 21.5% in the first phase. They belong to the tradition known as Triangular-Incised Ware and items of the same type have been found at coastal sites of Shanga, Manda, Kilwa, Lamu and the Comoros. The most likely point of origin for the red-slipped pieces found at Sharma, however, is Pemba.

There is about one twentieth as much glass from vessels has been recovered from Sharma as ceramic. It is mostly of Persian origin, but some may be from Egypt or Syria. Some of the glass vessels were merely containers, but others were probably trade goods in their own right.

Crockery carved from soapstone and greenschist had also been found at Sharma. It may originate in the area, since these minerals are found in Arabia, but the style has also been found at Kilwa, with pieces originating in Vohemar in Madagascar. It is possible that it was brought to Sharma along the same routes as the African pottery.

== Trade ==
Sharma probably imported much of its food. There is archaeobotanical evidence for the importation of wheat, rice, millet and sorghum. The rice was thought by its discoverers to have come from either Egypt or India, but it may have come from Madagascar, which is known to have exported rice to Kilwa that was then traded with Aden. There is also evidence—the pottery from Yadhghat—that Sharma traded with the Ḥaḍramī tribes of the interior, perhaps even forging alliances.

The Sharma "horizon" provides a brief glimpse at the trade networks of the entire western half of the Indian Ocean. The diversity of unglazed Indian pottery found at the site suggests that Indian merchants were present there. There may have been a permanent community of East African merchants importing familiar pottery for their own use. The African pottery and crockery may also be linked to grain importation. There may also have been Comorians or even Malagasy at Sharma (some of the copal may originate from Madagascar).

Sharma was mainly a transit entrepôt. It warehoused goods between their point of origin and point of sale. It may be seen as a northern extension of the "Swahili corridor". Its geographical position placed at the crossroads of the monsoons that led to and from East Africa and India. As for types of goods, the large number of stoneware jars indicates a high volume of trade in eastern perishables. Most of the incense recovered from the site is East African copal, which was certainly transited. Other incenses recovered from the site may have been imported. Circumstantial cases may be made linking Sharma with the trade in rock crystal from Madagascar and Dembeni, with the reprocessing of rough processed sugar cane from the Comoros, and with the Indian Ocean trade in African slaves. High-value African goods like ivory, rock crystal and gold were probably stored at Sharma for pickup by Indian merchants. There may have been African slaves resident in Sharma.

== Sources ==
- Beaujard, Philippe (2016). "Review of Rougeulle 2015". Antiquity. 90 (352): 1129–1131. doi:10.15184/aqy.2016.127.
- Horton, Mark (2018). "The Swahili Corridor Revisited (review)". African Archaeological Review. 35 (2): 341–346. doi:10.1007/s10437-018-9294-2. hdl:1983/19dba84f-b071-49ef-a3e4-18d4e583269b. S2CID 166142195.
- Pradines, Stéphane (2017). "Review of Rougeulle 2015". Journal of Islamic Archaeology. 4 (2): 267–271. doi:10.1558/jia.35279.
- Pradines, Stéphane (2019). "Islamic Archaeology in the Comoros: The Swahili and the Rock Crystal Trade with the Abbasid and Fatimid Caliphates". Journal of Islamic Archaeology. 6 (1): 109–135. doi:10.1558/jia.39521.
- Rougeulle, Axelle (2003). "Excavations at Sharmah, Ḥaḍramawt: The 2001 and 2002 Seasons". Proceedings of the Seminar for Arabian Studies. 33: 287–307. JSTOR 41223770.
- Rougeulle, Axelle (2005). "The Sharma Horizon: Sgraffiato Wares and Other Glazed Ceramics of the Indian Ocean Trade (ca 980–1150)". Proceedings of the Seminar for Arabian Studies. 35: 223–246.
- Rougeulle, Axelle, ed. (2015). Sharma: Un entrepôt de commerce médiéval sur la côte du Hadramawt (Yémen, ca. 980–1180). British Foundation for the Study of Arabia Monographs, 17. ArchaeoPress. ISBN 9781784911942.
