= Mujahid al-Haiqi =

Yemeni journalist (born 1992)

- مجاهد الحيقي
- Born: 1992 (age 33–34); Hadhramaut Governorate, Yemen
- Occupation: Journalist
- Employer: Yemen Oil and Gas Corporation
- Criminal charges: Unknown
- Criminal status: Detained

Mujahid al-Haiqi (Arabic: مجاهد الحيقي; born c. 1992) is a Yemeni journalist from Hadhramaut Governorate.

== Biography ==
Al-Haiqi is from Hadhramaut. He worked as head of the station agents department for the Yemen Oil and Gas Corporation's branch in Hadhramaut.

Al-Haiqi was also freelance journalist. He contributed to independent media outlets in Yemen such as Aden al-Ghad. He reported on human rights violations, particularly those happening in Hadhramaut linked to the Yemeni civil war.

In October 2023, al-Haiqi's home in Mukalla was stormed by the Hadhrami Elite Forces, a special operations force supervised by the United Arab Emirates and funded by Saudi Arabia to liberate Mukalla from al-Qaeda. Al-Haiqi and eight members of his family, including four children, were subsequently arrested. Al-Haiqi was released on 4 October after several hours of detention, alongside his family members, including his uncle, father, half-brother, and cousins.

Al-Haiqi's arrest was criticised by Luqman Baras, the governor of Hadhramaut, who called on local tribes to "drive" coalition forces outside of the governorate. He stated that the storming of houses was an attempt to "silence mouths" and "stabilise the occupation". The American Centre for Law and Justice condemned the raid on al-Haiqi's home, stating it reflected escalating violations being committed against journalists operating in conflict zones across Yemen.

In May 2025, during the President of the United States, Donald Trump's state visit to Saudi Arabia, al-Haiqi publicly urged the Crown Prince of Saudi Arabia, Mohammed bin Salman, to find a solution for Yemen and its people.

On 12 August 2025, al-Haiqi was detained at King Abdulaziz International Airport in Jeddah, Saudi Arabia after performing Umrah with his mother. He had been planning to fly to Cairo, Egypt where his father was undergoing medical treatment. Al-Haiqi's phone and passport was confiscated and he was taken to an undisclosed location. As of September 2025, Saudi Arabian authorities have not released a statement about al-Haiqi's arrest, his location, or the charges against him.

Al-Haiqi's relatives told Women Journalists Without Chains that they believed al-Haiqi had been arrested due to his reporting on issues in Hadhramaut Governorate. They stated he had not come to police attention during his stay in Saudi Arabia and there were no grounds to arrest him.

The Committee to Protect Journalists called on Saudi Arabian authorities to justify their detention of al-Haiqi or otherwise to immediately release him.

Women Journalists Without Chains described al-Haiqi's detention as "arbitrary" and a violation of articles 13 and 19 of the Universal Declaration of Human Rights, which guaranteed freedom of movement and freedom of expression. It called on Saudi Arabian authorities to disclose al-Haiqi's whereabouts and to immediately and unconditionally release him.

Yemeni human rights organisation Marsadak expressed concern that al-Haiqi had been subjected to an enforced disappearance and called on Saudi Arabian authorities to immediately reveal his fate, clarify the reasons for his arrest, and to ensure that he was subject to fair legal procedures.

The SAM Organisation for Rights and Liberties called al-Haiqi's arrest and disappearance a "grave violation of international law". In addition to calling on Saudi Arabian authorities to provide urgent clarification, it also called on Yemeni authorities to assume its legal and humanitarian responsibilities towards its citizens.
