= Battle of Ash-Shihr (1523) =

1523 Portuguese-Kathiri engagement

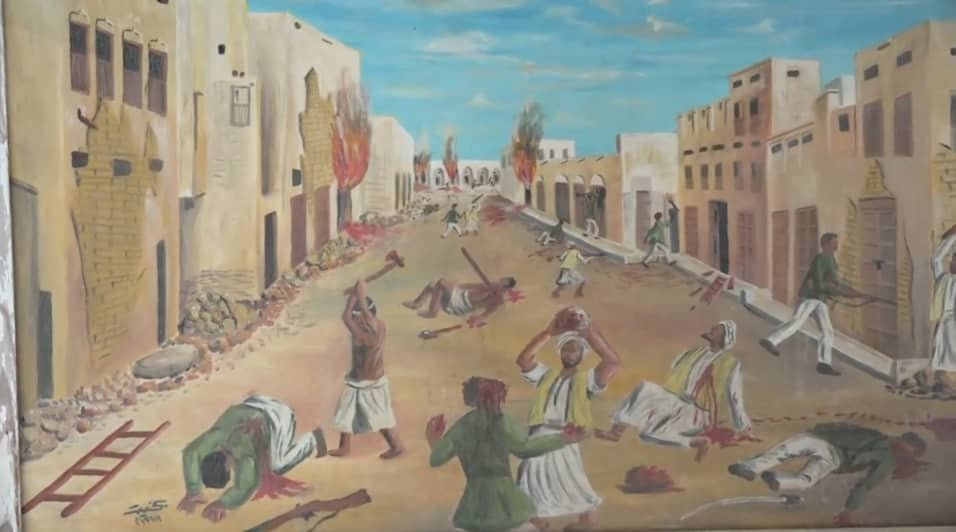
- Painting depicting Portuguese soldiers attacking and burning the city
Date	February 28 – March 2, 1523
Location	Ash-Shihr, Kathiri Sultanate
Result	Portuguese victory

Belligerents
Kingdom of Portugal	Kathiri Sultanate

Commanders and leaders
Duarte de Meneses; Luís de Meneses	Badr Abu Tuairq al-Kathiri; Mutran bin Mansur †; Atif bin Dahdah; Yaqoub Al-Haridi †; Salem Baaween †; Hussein Al-Aidaroos †; Ahmed ba-Fadl †; Fadl ba-Fadl †; Ahmed bin Abdullah ba-Fadl †

Strength
8 ships 6 galleons 400-700 soldiers	Unknown

Casualties and losses
Unknown	480+ killed

The Battle of Ash-Shihr was an attack launched by the Portuguese navy in 1523 on the city of Ash-Shihr which was a part of the Kathiri Sultanate.

== The battle ==
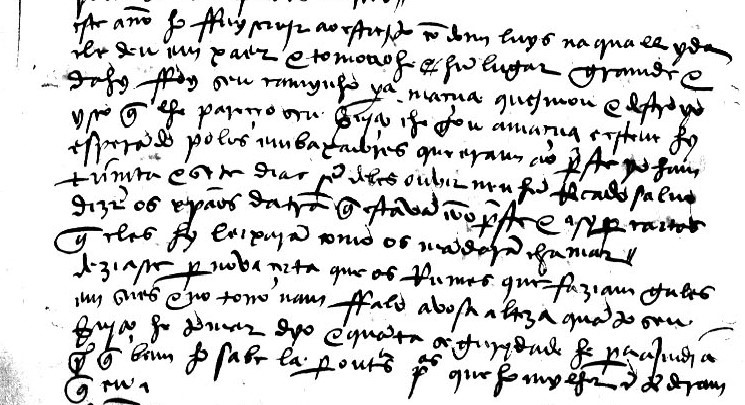
A 1523 letter from Henrique de Macedo to the King of Portugal, reporting the successful raid on Xael (Shihr). De Macedo writes, "This year I went to serve in the Straits with Dom Luis, in which expedition he attacked Xael and captured a large place (hum lugar grande) from them . . . he burnt and destroyed [the lugar grande] because it seemed to him to be to your service."

On Thursday, February 28, 1523 (or 9 Rabi’ II, 929 AH), the Portuguese governor of India, Duarte de Meneses, dispatched his brother, Luís de Meneses, to the Red Sea with a force of 6 galleons. Luís was tasked with delivering an ambassador to the Christian Emperor of Ethiopia and hunting hostile Muslim trade ships sailing between the Indian Ocean and Jeddah. Along the way, he called at the city of Ash-Shihr.

After claiming that the property of a Portuguese merchant who had died in al-Shiḥr had been unlawfully seized by the Kathīrī sultan, Dom Luís ordered the assault of the city. It was then successfully attacked and sacked while the inhabitants fled. Shihr was further plundered by the settlement's garrison, and by vagrants. The city's defenders attempted to face them on the beaches, but they were routed and the emir Mutran b. Mansur was killed in battle with a bullet. The battle continued for three days between the people of the city of Al-Shihr and the Portuguese forces.

Seven of Ash-Shihr's legal scholars and learned men were killed by the Portuguese. These men would collectively come to be a known as “The Seven Martyrs of al-Shiḥr” and whose tomb would become the site of an annual pilgrimage.

== Losses ==
About 480 residents of the city of Al-Shehr were killed in the battle, in addition to the killing of seven resistance leaders in the city of Al-Sheher:

1. Prince Mutran bin Mansur - Emir of the city of Ash-Shihr
2. Yaqoub bin Saleh Al-Haridi
3. Salem bin Saleh Baaween
4. Hussein bin Abdullah Al-Aidaroos
5. Ahmed bin Radwan ba-Fadl
6. Fadl bin Radwan ba-Fadl

In addition to: Ahmed bin Abdullah Belhaj ba-Fadl, whose family at the time requested that he be buried next to his father in the Dome of Belhaj ba-Fadl.

== Cultural significance ==
The Iddah dance

The people of Ash-Shihr built the Shrine of the Seven Martyrs, and its walls contained illustrations and evidence of the number of people buried there, in commemoration of their memory. The shrine became a place of visit every year once or twice, especially on the fourth or fifth day of Eid al-Fitr and Eid al-Adha. The visits include: popular dances such as the Baraa and the Iddah, the gathering of visitors, the selling of sweets, etc.

== See also ==
- Siege of Aden
- Capture of Aden (1548)
- Battle of al-Shihr (1548)
