= Battle of al-Shihr (1548) =

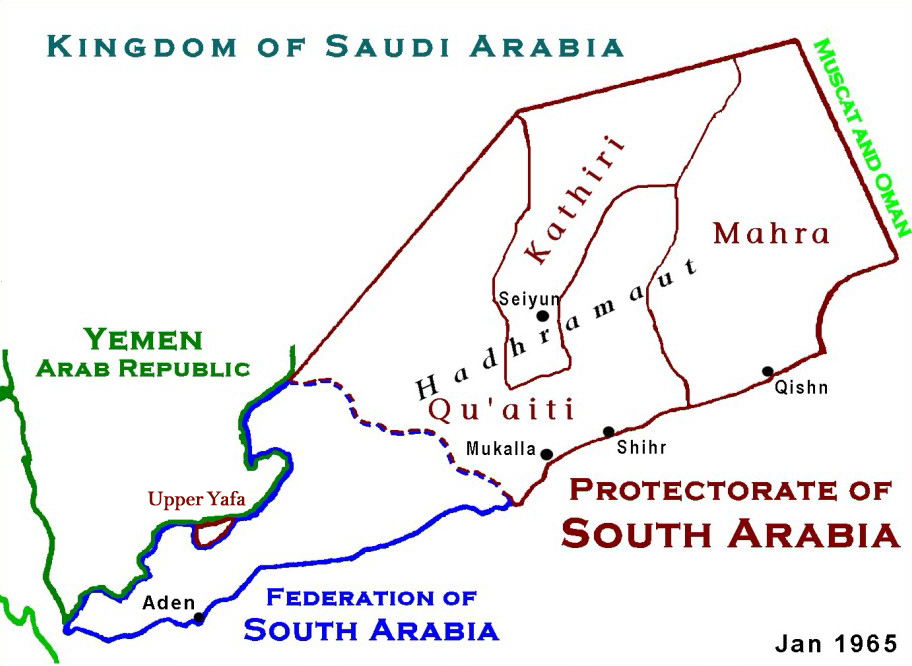
- a map shows Mahra Sultanate and Kathiri Sultanate
Date	April 7, 1548
Location	Al-Shihr
Result	Portuguese victory

Belligerents
Portuguese Empire; Mahra Sultanate	Kathiri Sultanate

Commanders and leaders
Dom Álvaro de Castro; Sa'd bin Afrar	Unknown

Strength
200 Portuguese soldiers 22 light-galleys	80 men

Casualties and losses
40 dead	All killed

The battle of al-Shihr was a military confrontation in 1548 between the Portuguese alongside Sa'd bin Afrar, the ruler of Mahra Sultanate and Kathiri Sultanate who had captured al-Mahrah from Sa'd. The Portuguese successfully captured the fort near al-Shihr from the Kathiris.

== Background ==
In early 1548, the city of Aden rose in rebellion against Ottoman rule and the local inhabitants dispatched envoys to Portuguese Goa, offering to become vassals of the King of Portugal and allowing them to install a garrison in the city in exchange for protection against the Turks. The Governor of India, Dom João de Castro dispatched his son Dom Álvaro de Castro, ahead of a force of 22 light galleys and 200 soldiers to Aden in January 1548. Dom Álvaro anchored with his party by an archipelago on the Arabian coast identified as "Canacarim", where he met Dom Paio de Noronha ahead of a small party of three light galleys, who informed Dom Álvaro that the Turks had already retaken the city. Dom Álvaro, therefore, decided to take his flotilla to Ash-Shihr and expunge the fort near al-Shihr, which had been captured by the Kathiri Sultan Badr.

== The siege ==
Upon arriving at Ash-Shihr, the Portuguese disembarked unimpeded. The ruler of Al Mahra Sa'd bin Afrar and his brother asked the Portuguese for aid because the Kathiri sultan Badr captured Mahrah country, Qishn, and its provinces, The Kathiris raised a white flag, then a red one, and opened fire on the Portuguese. Dom Álvaro had it bombarded, albeit with meager results, as he lacked heavy artillery and around 40 Portuguese killed. Sometime later two large galliots arrived with siege guns, with which the Portuguese were able to batter the walls of the fort heavily, and within a short, the garrison sent Sulaimân bin Sa'd bin Sulaimân al-Muhammadï who sought to surrender in exchange for freedom, The fort was stormed on April 7 and the Kathiri garrison was entirely slaughtered. and the fort delivered to the Afrar brothers. and Sulaimân bin Sa'd was taken prisoner to Goa.

Dom Álvaro was back in Goa by May 4.

== See also ==
- Battle of Ash-Shihr (1523)
- Battle of al-Shihr (1531)

== Bibliography ==
- Luís de Albuquerque: Diário da Viagem de D. Álvaro de Castro ao Hadramaute em 1548, in Revista da Universidade de Coimbra, Coimbra, 1972.
