= Sharj Ba Salim =

Coordinates: 14°32′N 49°07′E

- Interactive map of Sharj Ba Salim
- Country: Yemen
- Governorate: Hadhramaut
- Time zone: UTC+3 (Yemen Standard Time)

Sharj Ba Salim is a village in eastern Yemen. It is located in the Hadhramaut Governorate.
