= Al-Shihr =

al-Shihr ٱلشِّحْر
- Town
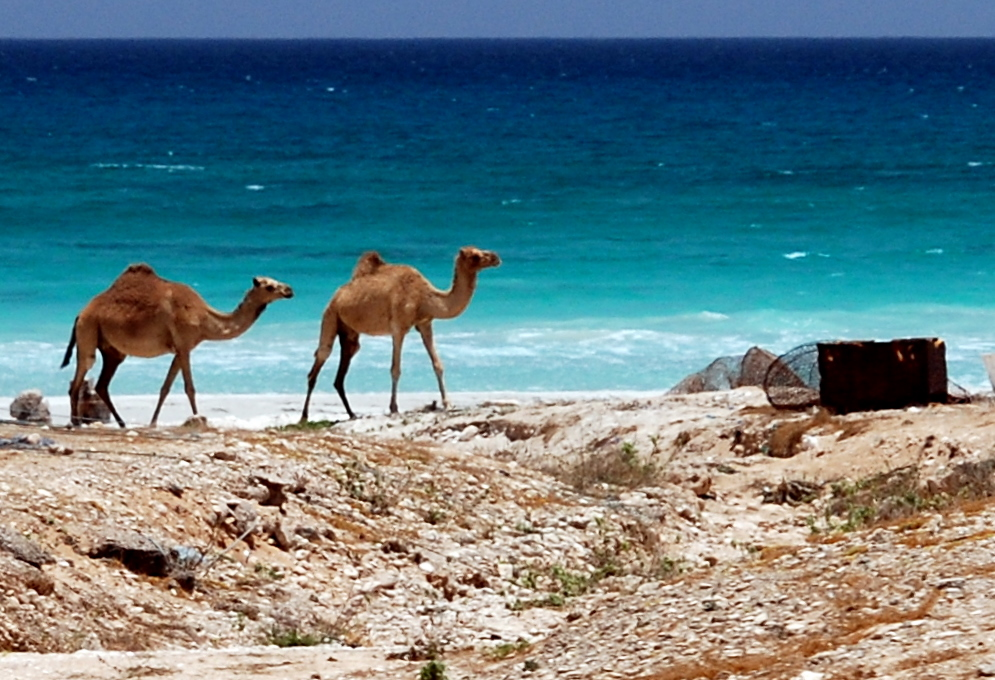
- Camels on the beach at al-Shihr

- Location in Yemen
- Coordinates: 14°45′39″N 49°36′25″E
- Country: Yemen
- Governorate: Hadhramaut
- District: al-Shihr
- Time zone: UTC+3 (Yemen Standard Time)

Al-Shihr (Arabic: ٱلشِّحْر, romanized: al-Shiḥr), also known as ash-Shir or simply Shihr, is a coastal town in Hadhramaut, eastern Yemen. Al-Shihr is a walled town located on a sandy beach. There is an anchorage but no docks; boats are used. The main export is fish oil. The town is divided in two by a wādi (dry riverbed) called al-Misyāl. The western quarter is called Majraf and the eastern al-Ramla. As of 1997, it had several souqs (markets), including Sūq al-Lakham, Sūq al-Hunūd, and Sūq Shibām.

== History ==
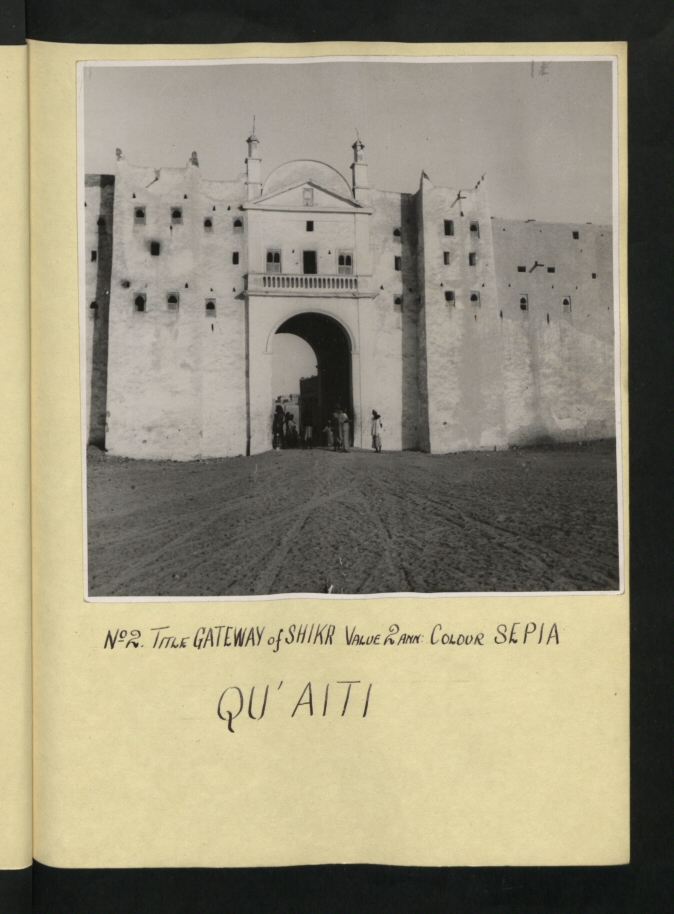
Al-Aidarous gate of Shihr

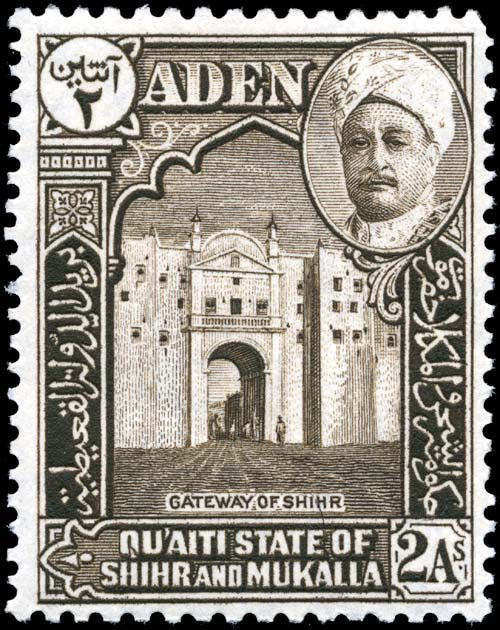
Northern gateway of al-Shihr on a stamp issued in 1942

The history of ash-Shihr (formerly also al-Asʿāʾ) can be traced back as far as about AD 780. It was a major port on the incense trade route as an exporter of frankincense to places as far away as China. Ibn Khurradādhbih calls the area around al-Shihr the bilād al-kundur, Land of Incense. It was also known for its ambergris, ʿanbar Shiḥrī. It was the main port of Hadhramaut until replaced by Mukalla in the 19th century.

Local pottery production at Yadhghat was exported through al-Shihr, possibly as early as the 10th century. In 980, the entrepôt of Sharma was founded by Persian exiles up the coast from al-Shihr. These rival ports are mentioned together in works of medieval Islamic geography. Writing in 985, al-Muqaddasī records that Sharma and ah-Shihr were dependencies of the Ziyadid dynasty. About 1150, al-Idrīsī wrote that Sharma and al-Shihr were stopovers on the sailing route from Aden to Mirbāṭ and were about one day apart. Around 1300, al-Dimashqī noted that Sharma and al-Shiḥr were the two harbors of Hadhramaut. Al-Shihr is also mentioned by Ibn Khaldun in his al-Muqaddimah.

Politically, al-Shihr has been under the Ziyadids (818–981), the Banū Maʿn (11th century), the Rasulids (1228–1454) and the Tahirids. After a short time, the latter lost it to the sultanate of Kathiri under Badr ibn Tuwayriq in 1462. In the 16th century, it was attacked several times by the Portuguese, who called it Xaer or Xael. There were battles in 1523, 1532, 1533, and 1548. There are still graves along the shore said to be of victims of the Portuguese.

In 1530, Mustafa Bey and Khoja Zufar arrived at the port of al-Shihr in Yemen. The Ottomans advised the Sultan of al-Shihr, Badr, to not submit to the Portuguese and left cannons and 100 levends (Ottoman irregular troops) with the Sultan of al-Shihr. Mustafa Bey left al-Shihr in December 1530 while Khoja Zufar remained with Badr. A Portuguese force of 9 sails led by Manoel de Vasconcellos immediately arrived at the port of al-Shihr, however, Khoja Zufar prevented the Portuguese from entering al-Shihr.

In 1548 Dom Álvaro arriving from Goa had it bombarded, albeit with meager results, as he lacked heavy artillery and around 40 Portuguese were killed. Sometime later two large galliots arrived with siege guns, with which the Portuguese were able to batter the walls of the fort heavily, and within a short time, the garrison sent Sulaimân bin Sa'd bin Sulaimân al-Muhammadï who sought to surrender in exchange for freedom, The fort was stormed on April 7 and the Kathiri garrison was entirely slaughtered. The fort was delivered to the Afrar brothers and Sulaimân bin Sa'd was taken prisoner to Goa.

Later, al-Shihr became one of the three major cities of the Qu'aiti Sultanate, before a unified Yemen was formed, the other two being Mukalla and Shibam.

Carsten Niebuhr visited al-Shihr in the 18th century.

Yemenis who emigrated to East Africa and their descendants are known as Shihiris, because most of them moved through the port of al-Shihr.

== See also ==
- Port of Shihr
