= List of terrorist incidents in 2016 =

This is a list of terrorist incidents which took place in 2016, including attacks by violent non-state actors for political motives. Note that terrorism related to drug wars and cartel violence is not included in these lists. Ongoing military conflicts are listed separately.

== List guidelines ==
- To be included, entries must be notable (have a stand-alone article) and described by a consensus of reliable sources as "terrorism".
- List entries must comply with the guidelines outlined in the manual of style under MOS:TERRORIST.
- Casualties figures in this list are the total casualties of the incident including immediate casualties and later casualties (such as people who succumbed to their wounds long after the attacks occurred).
- Casualties listed are the victims. Perpetrator casualties are listed separately (e.g. x (+y) indicate that x victims and y perpetrators were killed/injured).
- Casualty totals may be underestimated or unavailable due to a lack of information. A figure with a plus (+) sign indicates that at least that many people have died (e.g. 10+ indicates that at least 10 people have died) – the actual toll could be considerably higher. A figure with a plus (+) sign may also indicate that over that number of people have died.
- If casualty figures are 20 or more, they will be shown in **bold**. In addition, figures for casualties more than 50 will also be **underlined**.
- In addition to the guidelines above, the table also includes the following categories:

0 people were killed/injured by the incident.
1–19 people were killed/injured by the incident.
20–49 people were killed/injured by the incident.
50–99 people were killed/injured by the incident.
100+ people were killed/injured by the incident.

== List ==
Total Incidents: 144

Date	Type	Dead	Injured	Location	Article	Details	Perpetrator	Part of
Jan 1	Mass shooting	3	7	Tel Aviv, Israel	January 2016 Tel Aviv shooting	A gunman fired into a crowded pub and several other businesses in Dizengoff Street. The attacker then took a cab and then shot the driver dead. before he was found by counter-terrorism forces in his hometown of Ar'ara on 8 January and killed during a shootout.	Nasha'at Melhem	ISIL-inspired
Jan 2	Mass shooting	8 (+6)	20	Pathankot, India	2016 Pathankot attack	Militants disguised as soldiers attacked an Indian air base killing seven security force members, including Subedar Fateh Singh, who won gold and silver medals in the first Commonwealth Shooting Championships held in 1995, before being killed after a 15-hour gunfight. A civilian was also killed.	Jaish-e-Mohammed	Insurgency in Jammu and Kashmir
Jan 7	Car bombing	60	200	Zliten, Libya	Zliten truck bombing	A suicide truck bomb detonated at the al-Jahfal police training camp while around 400 young policemen were being trained.	ISIL (suspected)	Libyan Civil War
Jan 7	Melee attack	0 (+1)	0	Paris, France	January 2016 Paris police station attack	An asylum seeker shouted "Allahu Akbar!" outside a police station in Goutte d'Or, near Montmartre, where police shot and killed him while a by-passer was shot. Reports say he was wielding a knife and fake suicide vest.	Tarek Belgacem (ISIL-inspired)	Islamic terrorism in Europe
Jan 7	Shooting	0	1 (+1)	Philadelphia, United States	2016 shooting of Philadelphia police officer	In West Philadelphia, a gunman shot police officer Jesse Hartnett, who was driving a marked police car. Hartnett survived and was able to shoot the attacker.	Edward Archer	Islamic terrorism
Jan 8	Melee attack	0 (+1)	2 (+1)	Hurghada, Egypt	2016 Hurghada attack	Two militants armed with a melee weapon and a signal flare, arrived by sea and stormed Bella Vista Hotel, stabbing three foreign tourists from Sweden and Austria. One of the assailants was shot dead and the other was wounded by security forces. ISIL claimed responsibility.	ISIL	Insurgency in Egypt
Jan 11	Car bombing, hostage taking	106 (+6)	19+	Baghdad, Iraq	January 2016 Iraq attacks	Attack on the al-Jawhara mall after a car bomb exploded outside. Hostages were taken by six gunmen.	ISIL	Iraqi Civil War
Jan 11	Suicide bombing	20	Unknown	Miqdadiyah, Iraq	January 2016 Iraq attacks	Double blast at a cafe. A suicide bomber detonated an explosives-rigged vehicle after people gathered at the scene.	ISIL	Iraqi Civil War
Jan 11	Bombings	100+	Unknown	Sharaban, Iraq	January 2016 Iraq attacks	Two huge bomb blasts, one at a tea shop and the other at a mosque.	ISIL	Iraqi Civil War
Jan 12	Suicide bomber	13 (+1)	9	Istanbul, Turkey	January 2016 Istanbul bombing	A suicide bomber blew himself up near Hippodrome of Constantinople near the Sultan Ahmed Mosque.	ISIL	Turkey–ISIL conflict
Jan 13	Suicide bombing	15 (+1)	25	Quetta, Pakistan	January 2016 Quetta suicide bombing	A suicide bomber detonated himself near security personal vehicles close to a polio centre.	Tehrik-i-Taliban Pakistan or Jaishul Islam	Insurgency in Khyber Pakhtunkwa
Jan 14	Suicide bombings, shootout	4 (+4)	24	Jakarta, Indonesia	2016 Jakarta attacks	Several explosions followed by gunfire occurred with a Starbucks and a police station appearing to be the main targets. The attack involved seven participants.	ISIL	Islamic terrorism
Jan 15	Siege	63	Unknown	Eel-Adde, Somalia	Battle of El Adde	Massive attack on a Kenyan-run African Union base in Gedo.	Al-Shabaab	War in Somalia
Jan 15–16	Mass shooting, arson, hostage-taking, siege	30 (+4)	56+	Ouagadougou, Burkina Faso	2016 Ouagadougou attacks	Gunmen with heavy weapons attacked the Cappuccino restaurant and the Hotel Splendid in the city centre, where more than 100 hostages were taken. al-Qaeda in the Islamic Maghreb claimed responsibility for the attack.	AQIM	Insurgency in the Maghreb
Jan 16	Massacre	135–300+	Unknown	Deir ez-Zor, Syria	Deir ez-Zor offensive (January 2016)	Militants attacked the neighbourhoods of Begayliya and Ayash, killing dozens in an execution-style mass murder. International sources reported that the attack was against Syrian Army personnel and killed 85 Syrian soldiers along with 50 civilians, while Syrian sources said over 300 people were killed, most of whom were children and women.	ISIL	Syrian Civil War
Jan 20	Mass murder	20 (+4)	60	Charsadda, Pakistan	Bacha Khan University attack	Several gunmen, some equipped with suicide vests, opened fire on Bacha Khan University. At least four of the attackers were also killed during the attack. More than 200 students were rescued from the building.	Tehrik-i-Taliban Pakistan	Insurgency in Khyber Pakhtunkhwa
Jan 22	Suicide bombing, mass shooting	20 (+4)	17	Mogadishu, Somalia	January 2016 Mogadishu attack	Al-Shabaab militants struck with a suicide car bomb at the gate of a seafood restaurant overlooking Lido Beach. Another blast struck about an hour later as government soldiers laid siege to the restaurant. After the blasts, militants entered the near crowded hotel, some of them by boat, and attacked civilians within.	Al-Shabaab	War in Somalia
Jan 25	Suicide bombing	28 (+4)	65	Bodo, Cameroon	2016 Bodo bombings	Four suicide bombers attacked a busy market close to the Nigerian border.	Boko Haram (suspected)	Boko Haram insurgency
Jan 27	Car bomb	55	Unknown	Ramadi, Iraq	2016 Ramadi attack	Up to a dozen car bombs were set off attacking the tenth Iraqi Army division.	ISIL	Iraqi Civil War
Jan 30	Bombing	86	Unknown	Dalori, Nigeria	2016 Dalori attack		Boko Haram	Boko Haram insurgency
Jan 31	Bombing	60+	110	Damascus, Syria	2016 Sayyidah Zaynab bombings	Twin blasts in the mainly Shi'ite neighbourhood of Sayeda Zeinab.	ISIL	Syrian Civil War
Feb 2	Bombing	0 (+1)	2	Somalia	Daallo Airlines Flight 159	20 minutes after take-off, a passenger in Daallo Airlines Flight 159, detonated an explosive device in the Airbus A321, opening a hole in the fuselage behind the R2 door. The crew turned the plane around and successfully performed an emergency landing at Mogadishu's Aden Adde International Airport. Two injuries were reported and a body, believed to be that of the perpetrator was found on the ground.	al-Shabaab	War in Somalia
Feb 8	Execution	300	0	Mosul, Iraq	2016 Mosul attack	Islamic State executed over 300 police and army personnel, as well as civil activists by firing squad.	Islamic State	Iraqi Civil War
Feb 11	Shooting	0 (+1)	4	Columbus, Ohio, United States	2016 Ohio restaurant machete attack	Machete attack at a restaurant; the attacker was shot and killed by police at the end of a car chase.	Islamic terrorist (suspected)	
Feb 17	Suicide car bombing	30	61	Ankara, Turkey	February 2016 Ankara bombing	Attack on army buses near the central square of Kizilay, home to many ministries, army headquarters and the Turkish parliament.	Kurdistan Freedom Falcons	Kurdish–Turkish conflict
Feb 18	Bombing	6	1	Diyarbakır, Turkey	2016 Diyarbakır bombing	A bomb killed at least 6 soldiers and another was injured.	Kurdistan Freedom Falcons	Kurdish–Turkish conflict
Feb 21	Bombing	57	100+	Homs, Syria	February 2016 Homs bombings	Two bombings occurred in pro-Government, mainly Shia inhabited, Zahraa neighbourhood. The first blast was caused by a car bomb and the second one was a result of a car bomb or a suicide bombing.	Islamic State	Syrian Civil War
Feb 21	Bombing	134 (+2)	180	Sayyidah Zaynab, Syria	February 2016 Sayyidah Zaynab bombings	Militants detonated a car bomb and later launched two suicide bombings about 400 meters from Sayyidah Zaynab Mosque, a Shia shrine, believed to contain the grave of Prophet Muhammad's granddaughter. The attack occurred when pupils were leaving school in the area. At least 60 shops were damaged as well as cars in the area.	Islamic State	Syrian Civil War
Feb 26	Suicide bombing, shooting	14 (+5)	Unknown	Mogadishu, Somalia	February 2016 Mogadishu attack	A suicide bomber blew the entrance of the SYL hotel allowing gunmen to storm the hotel and clash with the hotel guards. Government forces arrived and ended the attack.	Al-Shabaab	War in Somalia
Feb 28	Bomb	78 (+2)	100+	Sadr City Baghdad, Iraq	February 2016 Baghdad bombings	Two bombs went off at a crowded market selling mobile phones in the mainly Shiite Muslim district.	Islamic State	Iraqi Civil War
Mar 7	Clashes, raid	17 (+36)	Unknown (+6)	Ben Guerdane, Tunisia	Battle of Ben Guerdane	Attackers from Libya attacked a barracks. 36 attackers were killed by the army.	Islamic State	Second Libyan Civil War
Mar 8	Melee attack	1 (+1)	11	Jaffa, Tel Aviv, Israel	2016 Tel Aviv knife attack	A Palestinian man from Qalqilya stabbed three people at the Jaffa Port and then stabbed others near a restaurant in Charles Clore Park. One American tourist was killed and nine others were wounded. The assailant was shot dead by police. US Vice President Joe Biden was at a visit, one mile (1.6 km) from the incident.	Bashar Massalha (Palestinian lone wolf)	Israeli–Palestinian conflict
Mar 13	Shooting	19 (+3)	33	Grand-Bassam, Ivory Coast	2016 Grand-Bassam shootings	Gunmen attacked two hotels at a beach resort popular with Western tourists. Witnesses say the gunmen were shouting "Allahu akbar" during the gunfire.	AQIM	Insurgency in the Maghreb
Mar 13	Car bombing, shooting	37 (+1)	125	Ankara, Turkey	March 2016 Ankara bombing	Car bombing in the Kizilay area. Gunfire was heard after the blast.	Kurdistan Freedom Falcons	Kurdish–Turkish conflict
Mar 16	Bombing	15	25	Peshawar, Pakistan	2016 Peshawar bus bombing	A bomb detonated in a bus carrying government employees.	Unknown	War in North-West Pakistan
Mar 16	Suicide bombings	22	18	Maiduguri, Nigeria	2016 Maiduguri suicide bombings	Two female suicide bombers detonate their explosives at a mosque during morning prayers.	Boko Haram	Boko Haram insurgency
Mar 19	Suicide bombing	4+ (+1)	36	Istanbul, Turkey	March 2016 Istanbul bombing	A suicide bomber hit a busy tourist area.	Islamic State	Turkey–ISIL conflict
Mar 19	Mortar attack, shooting	13 (+5)	0	Arish, Egypt	2016 Arish attack	Mortar attack on a checkpoint in the Sinai Peninsula. Security officials said five attackers were killed in clashes near the checkpoint after the attack.	Wilayat Sayna	Sinai Insurgency
Mar 22	suicide bombing	32 (+3)	340	Brussels and Zaventem, Belgium	2016 Brussels bombings	Four coordinated nail bombings: two at Brussels Airport in Zaventem, and one at Maalbeek metro station in Brussels. The fourth bomb did not go off.	Islamic State	Islamic terrorism in Europe
Mar 25	Suicide bombing	41 (+1)	65	Iskandariya, Iraq	Iskandariya suicide bombing	A suicide bomber blew himself up in a crowd after a football game in a mixed Sunni-Shiite area. The mayor of the town was among those killed.	Islamic State	Iraqi Civil War
Mar 25	Car bombing	26	Unknown	Aden, Yemen	2016 Aden car bombing	Triple suicide car bomb that hit roadblocks defended by loyalist forces. Two car bombs exploded in the al-Shaab area in the west of Aden and an ambulance exploded against a checkpoint near Mansoura in the center of the city.	Islamic State	Yemeni Civil War
Mar 27	Suicide bombing	72	200	Lahore, Pakistan	2016 Lahore suicide bombing	Suicide bombing that hit the main entrance of Gulshan-e-Iqbal Park.	Tehrik-i-Taliban Pakistan	War in North-West Pakistan
Mar 31	Car bomb	7	27	Diyarbakir, Turkey	March 2016 Diyarbakır bombing	Seven police officers were killed and twenty seven wounded when the minibus they were travelling in was hit by a car bomb.	PKK	Kurdish–Turkish conflict
Apr 10	Ambush	11	6	Santo Domingo de Acobamba District, Peru	Hatun Asha ambush	The ambush began at approximately 5:00 (a.m.), when guerrillas targeted a military convoy along a rural road transporting election ballots and related materials and also serving as guards for polling stations. The ambush left a total of nine government soldiers and two civilian contractors dead. Two hours after the attack, a second attack occurred in Mayapo, on the Llochegua District in Ayacucho, where one police officer was injured and taken to a hospital in Pichari.	Shining Path	Internal conflict in Peru
Apr 18	Bombing	0 (+1)	21	Jerusalem, Israel	2016 Jerusalem bombing	Explosion on board a bus.	Hamas	Israeli–Palestinian conflict
Apr 19	Suicide car bombing, shooting	64 (+1)	347	Kabul, Afghanistan	2016 Kabul attack	Suicide bomb and gun assault on a government security building during morning rush hour.	Taliban	War in Afghanistan
Apr 27	Suicide bombing	0 (+1)	13	Bursa, Turkey	2016 Bursa bombing	A suicide bomber blew herself up in the 14th century Grand Mosque.	Kurdistan Freedom Falcons	Kurdish–Turkish conflict
Apr 30	Suicide car bombing, bombing	38 (+1)	86	Baghdad, Iraq	April 2016 Baghdad bombing	A suicide bomber driving a car attacked a group of Shi'ite Muslim pilgrims in a southeastern suburb of Baghdad. A second explosion struck near a Shi'ite militia checkpoint in the Dora district.	Islamic State and Unknown	Iraqi Civil War
May 1	Car bomb	2	23	Gaziantep, Turkey	May 2016 Gaziantep bombing	Two policemen were killed and 22 others (four being civilians) were wounded after a car bomb exploded outside police headquarters.	Islamic State	Turkey–ISIL conflict
May 1	Suicide bombing	33+ (+2)	75	Samawa, Iraq	2016 Samawa bombing		Islamic State	Iraqi Civil War
May 10	Car bombing	3		Diyarbakir, Turkey	May 2016 Diyarbakır bombing	Car bomb targeting a police vehicle.	PKK	Kurdish–Turkish conflict (2015–present)
May 11	Suicide and car bombings	103	165+	Baghdad, Iraq	11 May 2016 Baghdad bombings		ISIL	Iraqi Civil War
May 12	Massacre	49+	Unknown	Zara'a, Syria	Zara'a massacre	Militant attack on an Alawite village in Hama Governorate. Around 70 other civilians, including women and children were kidnapped and taken to Al-Rastan.	Al-Nusra Front and Ahrar ash-Sham	Syrian civil war
May 13	Shooting	16+	30+	Balad, Iraq	Real Madrid Fan Club massacre	Real Madrid fans were killed in an attack on their clubhouse.	Islamic State	Iraqi Civil War
May 15	Suicide bombing	14+ (+9, maybe more)	20+	Taji, Iraq	2016 Iraq Gas Plant attack	Suicide bomb attacks in a state owned cooking gas plant.	ISIL	Iraqi Civil War
May 15	Suicide bombing	47+ (+1)	60+	Mukalla, Yemen	May 2016 Yemen police bombings		Islamic State	Yemeni Civil War
May 17	Suicide and car bombings, shooting	101+	194+	Baghdad, Iraq	17 May 2016 Baghdad bombings	Series of eight attacks.	Islamic State	Iraqi Civil War
May 23	Suicide bombing	45+	60+	Aden, Yemen	23 May 2016 Yemen bombings	Army recruits are killed and 60 others injured in a suicide car bomb attack.	Islamic State	Yemeni Civil War
May 23	Suicide bombing	184 (5)	200	Jableh and Tartus, Syria	23 May 2016 Syrian bombings	Series of car bomb and suicide attacks in government-controlled territory that hosts Russian military bases.	Islamic State	Syrian Civil War
May 29	Suicide bombing	12+ (+1)	~15	Balad, Iraq	Real Madrid Fan Club massacre	Real Madrid fans were killed and more injured when watching the 2016 UEFA Champions League Final.	Islamic State	Iraqi Civil War
May 31	Kidnapping and execution	17+ (+6)	Around 220 kidnapped	Kunduz-Takhar highway, Afghanistan	Kunduz-Takhar highway hostage crisis	The Taliban executed at least 17 people after kidnapping around 220 people on buses and in cars at a fake checkpoint. 6 people were killed by Afghan forces when they attempted to flee the scene. Around 20 hostages were moved to Char Dara District.	Taliban	War in Afghanistan (2001–present)
Jun 1	Suicide car bombing, hostage-taking	16 (+3)	55	Mogadishu, Somalia	June 2016 Mogadishu attack	A suicide bomber detonated a car bomb outside the Ambassador Hotel after which two gunmen opened fire on the hotel and took hostages before being killed by police.	Al-Shabaab	War in Somalia
Jun 5–6	Spree shooting, shootouts	10 (+13)	37+	Aktobe, Kazakhstan	2016 Aktobe shootings	Over 20 militants attacked a military facility and two firearm stores. The attacks killed a clerk, a military officer and a serviceman at a national guard facility. Another nine servicemen were wounded. The police launched a counter-terrorism operation in which it managed to kill four militants and detain seven but others escaped.	Islamic State	Islamic terrorism
Jun 7	Bombing	11	36	Istanbul, Turkey	June 2016 Istanbul bombing	A bomb exploded on a police bus in the Vezneciler district	TAK	Kurdish-Turkish conflict
Jun 8	Car bombing	5	30	Midyat, Turkey	June 2016 Midyat car bombing		PKK (Suspected)	Kurdish-Turkish conflict
Jun 8	Shooting	4	18 (+1)	Tel Aviv, Israel	June 2016 Tel Aviv shooting	Two Palestinian gunmen opened fire in a Max Brenner restaurant killing diners. Both perpetrators were arrested.	Khalid al-Mahmara and Muhammad Ahmad Moussa Mahmara (inspired by the Islamic State)	Israeli–Palestinian conflict
Jun 8	Kidnapping, shooting, and execution	16+	42+ more kidnapped	Kunduz, Afghanistan	Kunduz-Takhar highway hostage crisis	In a continuation of a prior event, 12 hostages were executed, and 42 more people were kidnapped. Four more people were also killed during the new kidnappings.	Taliban	War in Afghanistan
Jun 12	Shooting	49 (+1)	53	Orlando, Florida, United States	Orlando nightclub shooting	An alleged lone-wolf gunman entered the Pulse gay nightclub. The perpetrator was shot dead by SWAT units.	Lone wolf/Omar Mateen, pledged allegiance to Islamic State during attack.	Islamic terrorism
Jun 13	Melee attack, hostage-taking	2 (+1)	0	Magnanville, France	June 2016 Paris police stabbing	A man shouting "Islamist slogans" stabbed his neighbor, a 42-year-old police officer, to death before taking the officer's wife and son hostage. Police raided the house and killed the attacker and discovered the officer's wife dead but his son alive.	Islamic State	Islamic terrorism in Europe
Jun 15	Armed Assault	41	5	Raja, South Sudan		Assailants opened fire on SPLA soldiers in Raja. The assailants also set fire to the residence of the local governor. At least 41 people, including seven soldiers, 20 civilians, and 14 assailants, were killed and five other people were injured in the ensuing clash.	Islamic Movement for the Liberation of Raja and the Lord's Resistance Army (suspected)	South Sudanese Civil War
Jun 16	Shooting and stabbing	1	1	Birstall, United Kingdom	Murder of Jo Cox	Labour Member of Parliament Jo Cox was assassinated by a neo-Nazi constituent.	Thomas Mair	
Jun 20	Suicide bombing	16 (+1)	9	Kabul, Afghanistan	Kabul attack on Canadian Embassy Guards	Afghan, Nepali, and Indian security contractors were killed when a suicide bomber detonated outside the minibus they were in. The people killed were security guards at the Canadian embassy.	Islamic State (claimed), Taliban (claimed)	War in Afghanistan
Jun 25	Suicide car bombing, hostage-taking	15+	25+	Mogadishu, Somalia	June 2016 Mogadishu attacks	Terrorists detonated a car bomb outside a hotel popular with foreigners and tourists before storming the building and taking hostages.	Al-Shabaab	War in Somalia
Jun 25	Armed Assault	43	0	Wau, South Sudan		Assailants attacked Wau city in Lol, South Sudan. At least 43 people, including four police officers, were killed in the assault.	Islamic Movement for the Liberation of Raja	South Sudanese Civil War
Jun 27	Bombings	43+ to 50 (+8)	37	Mukalla, Yemen	June 2016 Mukalla attacks	At least seven bombings were simultaneously targeted checkpoints in the port city, followed by a fourth that struck the entrance to a military camp.	Islamic State	Yemeni Civil War
Jun 28	Grenade	0	8	Kuala Lumpur, Malaysia	2016 Movida Bar grenade attack	Grenade attack on patrons at the Movida nightclub watching a UEFA European Championships match. The bombing is believed to be the first IS-related attack on Malaysia. Two people were arrested in July. However, Muhammad Wanndy denied that he ordered the attack and said that the two arrested men are Islamic State supporters.	Islamic State	
Jun 28	Suicide bombings, shooting	45 (+3)	239	Istanbul, Turkey	2016 Atatürk Airport attack	Three suicide attackers opened fire and blew themselves up at Atatürk Airport.	Islamic State	Turkey–ISIL conflict
Jul 1	Shooting, hostage-taking	24 (+5)	50	Dhaka, Bangladesh	July 2016 Dhaka attack	Gunmen attacked a restaurant popular with foreigners in the wealthy Gulshan Thana area.	Islamic State	Internal conflict in Bangladesh, Attacks by Islamic extremists in Bangladesh
Jul 3	Bombing	342+ (+1)	246+	Baghdad, Iraq	2016 Karrada bombing	Series of coordinated bomb attacks. Early in the evening, a large car bomb exploded in the middle of a busy market. The blast occurred in the Baghdad neighborhood of Karrada, which contains Shia Muslims and a large Christian minority. A second car bombing in the district of Sha'ab killed at least 5 people and injured 16, while two more bombings killed at least two more people.	Islamic State	Iraqi Civil War
Jul 4	Suicide bombing	4 (+4)	7	Jeddah, Qatif and Medina, Saudi Arabia	2016 Saudi Arabia bombings	A man blew himself up after police tried to arrest him near the United States consulate. Two Saudi police officers were injured. Two suicide bombers targeted a Shia mosque in Qatif, but failed to harm anyone but themselves. A suicide bomber targeted security forces outside the Prophet's Mosque in Medina killing 4 and wounding 5 others.	Islamic State	Terrorism in Saudi Arabia
Jul 7	Suicide bombing, shooting	56+ to 100+ (+3)	75+	Balad, Iraq	Muhammad ibn Ali al-Hadi Mausoleum attack	A suicide car bomb blew up at the gate of the Mausoleum of Sayid Mohammed bin Ali al-Hadi. Gunmen then entered the mausoleum and started shooting. Islamic State claimed that they killed over 100 people.	Islamic State	Iraqi Civil War
Jul 14	Vehicular Assault	86 (+1)	434	Nice, France	2016 Nice truck attack	A 19 tonne cargo truck was deliberately driven into crowds celebrating Bastille Day on the Promenade des Anglais.	Islamic State	Islamic terrorism in Europe
Jul 18	Shooting	10 (+1)	10+	Almaty, Kazakhstan	2016 shooting of Almaty police officers	Attack on a police station. One of the attackers was detained.	Ruslan Kulikbayev	
Jul 18	Melee attack	0 (+1)	5	Würzburg, Germany	2016 Würzburg train attack	A 17-year-old Afghan asylum seeker attacked passengers on a train with an axe and a knife. The attacker was killed by police.	Islamic State	Islamic terrorism in Europe
Jul 18	Shooting	17	35	Nampala, Mali	2016 Nampala attack	Gunmen attacked a Malian Army base close to the border with Mauritania. 17 soldiers were killed and 35 others were wounded in the attack, which was jointly claimed by three separate groups.	Macina Liberation Front; AQIM; Ethnic Peul militants	Northern Mali conflict
Jul 22	Shooting	9 (+1)	36	Munich, Germany	2016 Munich shooting	A gunman opened fire on a shopping mall before committing suicide. The shooter was a bullied man who was said to be obsessed with mass shootings. The massacre was conducted on the anniversary of the 2011 Norway attacks. The suspect was described as being a "very nationalistic" racist, with him boasting about similarities with Adolf Hitler.	David Sonboly	Terrorism in Germany
Jul 23	Suicide bombing	80+ (+2)	260+	Kabul, Afghanistan	July 2016 Kabul bombing	Two suicide bombers targeted ethnic Hazaras at a rally.	Islamic State	War in Afghanistan
Jul 24	Suicide bombing	0 (+1)	12	Ansbach, Germany	2016 Ansbach bombing	A 27-year-old Syrian refugee detonated a bomb at a wine bar, killing only himself. He had previously been denied entry to a nearby music festival.	Islamic State	Islamic terrorism in Europe
Jul 26	Melee Attack, hostage-taking	1 (+2)	1	Saint-Étienne-du-Rouvray, France	2016 Normandy church attack	Two assailants killed a priest and seriously wounded a woman in a church. The assailants were killed by French Special Forces.	Islamic State	Islamic terrorism in Europe
Jul 27	Suicide bombing	57+ (+2)	171+	Qamishli Syria	27 July 2016 Qamishli bombings	A terrorist detonated his van packed with explosives at a checkpoint.	Islamic State	Syrian Civil War
Jul 31	Shootings	3	77 (+3)	Yerevan, Armenia	2016 Yerevan hostage crisis	About 20 gunmen took control of a police station, killing two officers. 77 people were injured and 100 others were arrested. 3 gunmen were also injured. Hostages were taken. The gunmen surrendered on July 31, two weeks after seizing the police station.	Daredevils of Sassoun	Nagorno-Karabakh conflict
Aug 5	Shooting, bombing	14	15	Kokrajhar, India	2016 Kokrajhar shooting	Six terrorists, suspected to be Bodo militants, attacked the Balajan Tinali market area with AK-47s and grenades.	National Democratic Front of Bodoland (suspected)	Assam separatist movements
Aug 6	Melee attack	0 (+1)	2	Charleroi, Belgium	2016 Charleroi attack	Two policewomen were attacked by man wielding a machete and shouting ‘Allahu Akbar'. The assailant was shot and killed by a third officer.	Islamic State	Islamic terrorism in Europe
Aug 8	Shooting and suicide bombing	93+ (+1)	130+	Quetta, Pakistan	August 2016 Quetta attacks	Suicide bomb attack at a hospital.	Taliban	War in North-West Pakistan
Aug 14	Melee attack	64+ to 101	Unknown	Beni City, Democratic Republic of the Congo	Beni massacre		Allied Democratic Forces (Suspected)	Allied Democratic Forces insurgency
Aug 14	Attack	11–15 (+8)	Unknown	Tshimbulu, Democratic Republic of the Congo	Tshimbulu incident	Policemen intervened in an attack by a militia. 11 policemen were killed and 8 terrorists were also killed, with 40 militants being captured. The leader of the militia was also killed. Four policemen went missing.	"Militia"	Kivu Conflict
Aug 15	Suicide bombing	50	50	Idlib, Syria	2016 Atmeh attack	Suicide bombing on a bus carrying opposition fighters at the entrance of Atmeh camp.	Unknown	Syrian Civil War
Aug 17	Shooting and stabbing	1 (+2 attackers)	1	Moscow oblast, Russia	2016 Shchelkovo Highway police station attack	Two men with firearms and axes attacked the police station on 20th kilometer of Shchelkovo Highway near Moscow. Two traffic police officers were seriously injured, one of them died in hospital. Attackers, natives of the Chechen Republic, were killed during the attack. ISIL claimed responsibility for the attack.	ISIL	Islamic terrorism in Europe
Aug 20	Suicide bombing	54+ (+1)	66	Gaziantep, Turkey	August 2016 Gaziantep suicide bombing	Suicide bomb attack at a Kurdish wedding ceremony near the Syrian border. The suicide bomber was aged 12 to 14, reports say.	Islamic State	Turkey–ISIL conflict
Aug 21	Suicide car bombing	20 (+2)	30	Galkayo, Somalia	2016 Galkayo bombings	Double suicide car bombing in the semi-autonomous Puntland region.	Al-Shabaab	War in Somalia
Aug 24	Bombing, shooting	17+	50+	Kabul, Afghanistan	American University of Afghanistan attack	Bombing and shooting at the American University of Afghanistan.	Taliban (suspected)	War in Afghanistan
Aug 29	Bombing	71+ (+1)	Unknown	Aden, Yemen	August 2016 Aden bombing	Suicide car bombing at a military facility.	Islamic State	Yemeni Civil War
Aug 30	Suicide car bombing	0 (+1)	3	Bishkek, Kyrgyzstan	Chinese Embassy in Bishkek bombing	A car rammed through the gates of the Chinese Embassy and exploded, killing the driver.	East Turkistan Islamic Movement (suspected)	Xinjiang conflict
Sep 2	Bombing	15	70	Davao City, Philippines	2016 Davao City bombing	A bomb exploded at a night market.	Islamic State	Moro conflict
Sep 5	Bombing	48-70+ (+1)	Unknown	Tartus, Homs, Damascus and Hasakah, Syria	5 September 2016 Syria bombings	A car bomb detonated on a coastal highway in Tartus, killing more than 5 people, followed by a suicide bomber exploding in the crowd gathering in the area. A car bomb then hit a Syrian Army checkpoint in the Zahra district of Homs and killed 2 soldiers. A motorcycle bomb detonated near an Asayish checkpoint in Hasakah and killed at least 5 people, with an explosion in the capital city of Damascus following soon after.	Islamic State	Syrian civil war
Sep 5	Suicide bombings	58 (+5)	109	Kabul, Afghanistan	September 2016 Kabul attacks	Double suicide attack in rush hour near the Ministry of Defence. A third explosion caused one death. Other attacks also occurred that lasted overnight.	Taliban	War in Afghanistan
Sep 10	Car bombings	40 (+2)	60	Baghdad, Iraq	9 September 2016 Baghdad bombings	Two car bombs exploded outside a crowded shopping center. Most of the victims were Shi'a Muslims.	Islamic State	Iraqi Civil War
Sep 16	Suicide Bombing	35 (+1)	34	Mohmand Agency, Pakistan	2016 September Pakistan mosque bombing	A suicide bomber attacked a Sunni mosque.	Jamaat-ul-Ahrar	War in North-West Pakistan
Sep 17–19	Bombings, shootout	0	32 (+1)	New York and New Jersey, United States	2016 New York and New Jersey bombings	Around 9:30 am, a pipe bomb exploded in a trash can in Seaside Park, New Jersey, but no one was injured. Later that day, at around 8:30 pm, a homemade pressure cooker bomb exploded in the Chelsea neighborhood of Manhattan, injuring 29 people. A second pressure cooker bomb was promptly discovered four blocks away, but did not detonate. The following day, two homeless men discovered a backpack containing several pipe bombs in Elizabeth, New Jersey. On September 19, the perpetrator was captured in Linden, New Jersey, after a shootout with police which left three officers and the suspect wounded.	Ahmad Khan Rahami (suspect)	Islamic terrorism
Sep 17	Stabbing	0 (+1)	10	Minnesota, United States	2016 St. Cloud, Minnesota knife attack	22-year-old lone wolf Dahir Adan committed a mass stabbing inside a mall in St. Cloud Minnesota using two steak knives. 10 people were injured before Dahir was fatally shot by an off-duty law enforcement officer	Dahir Adan	Suspected Islamic terrorism, Perpetrator said multiple phrases about Allah including "Allahu Akbar"
Sep 18	Shooting	19 (+4 Attackers)	30	Uri, India	2016 Uri attack	Seventeen soldiers were killed in an attack on a base in Kashmir.	Unknown	Kashmir conflict
Oct 5	Melee attack	0	3 (+1)	Brussels, Belgium	2016 stabbing of Brussels police officers	Three police officers were attacked by a man wielding a machete in the Schaerbeek neighborhood. Two of them suffered stab wounds, while the third was assaulted but otherwise uninjured. Several stations and the anti-terrorism prosecution office was also evacuated due to a bomb-alert.	Islamic State	Islamic terrorism in Europe
Oct 6	Car bombing	0	10	Istanbul, Turkey	October 2016 Istanbul bombing	Car bomb near a police station.	PKK (suspected)	Kurdish–Turkish conflict
Oct 9	Shooting	2 (+1)	6	East Jerusalem	2016 Jerusalem shooting	A Palestinian arrived at a tram stop in his car and shot "randomly" at passers-by. A 60-year-old woman and a police officer were killed; the attacker himself was pursued by police and later shot dead.	Palestinian lone wolf	Israeli–Palestinian conflict
Oct 9	Car bombing	15	27	Şemdinli, Turkey	2016 Şemdinli bombing		PKK	Kurdish–Turkish conflict
Oct 15	Suicide bombing, Shooting	53+ (+ at least 6)	44+	Baghdad, Iraq	October 2016 Baghdad attacks	Suicide bomber targeted a mourning tent. In a second incident, the wife and three children of Numan al-Mujamaie, the leader of the Ishaqi Mobilization militia, were killed when gunmen stormed his house in the town of Ishaq in his absence.	Islamic State	Iraqi Civil War
Oct 16	Stabbing	1	1	Hamburg, Germany	2016 Hamburg stabbing attack		Islamic State	Islamic terrorism in Europe
Oct 24	Hostage taking, shooting, suicide bombing	62 (+3)	117+	Quetta, Pakistan	2016 Quetta police training college attack	At least five militants stormed a police training center and took between 200 and 500 cadets hostage. Three of the attackers were killed and at least 60 people were killed and 120 were injured. Several hostages escaped as well.	Islamic State and Lashkar-e-Jhangvi	Sectarianism in Pakistan
Oct 25	Shooting	1 (+1)	3	Virginia, United States	2016 FreightCar America shooting	A 53-year-old Kenyan refugee who was former employee of FreightCar America shot 4 people in a Freightcar America building killing one and injuring the three other people before committing suicide. Terrorism is a suspected motive in the shooting.	Getachew Fekede	Suspected terrorism
Nov 4	Car bombing	11	100+	Diyarbakir, Turkey	November 2016 Diyarbakır bombing		Islamic State	Turkey–ISIL conflict
Nov 8	Executions	300+	Unknown	Mosul, Iraq	Hamam al-Alil massacre	Killing of civilians who refused to fight for ISIL.	Islamic State	Iraqi Civil War
Nov 10	Suicide car bombing	6 (+1)	119	Mazar-i-Sharif, Afghanistan	German consulate in Mazar-i-Sharif attack	A truck bomb exploded outside the German consulate.	Taliban	War in Afghanistan
Nov 12	Suicide bombing	5 (+1)	16	Bagram, Afghanistan	2016 Bagram Airfield bombing	A suicide bomber exploded outside the U.S. air base.	Taliban	War in Afghanistan
Nov 12	Suicide bombing	55 (+1)	102+	Khuzdar, Pakistan	2016 Khuzdar bombing	A suicide bomber detonated in the crowded Shah Noorani Shrine in Hub town, Lasbela District, Balochistan.	Islamic State	Islamic terrorism
Nov 13	Bombing	1	3 (+1)	Samarinda, Indonesia	2016 Samarinda church bombing	Explosion outside a church.	Islamic State	Islamic terrorism
Nov 24	Suicide truck bombing	125 (+1)	95	Hillah, Iraq	November 2016 Hillah suicide truck bombing		Islamic State	Iraqi Civil War
Nov 26	Car bombing	20	Unknown	Mogadishu, Somalia	November Mogadishu car bombing	Car bomb near a market.	Al-Shabaab	War in Somalia
Nov 26–30	Clash	0 (+63)	30 (+17)	Butig, Philippines	November 2016 Butig clash	The Maute Group briefly seized control of parts of the town, in retaliation of an offensive launched by the Armed Forces of the Philippines. Government forces killed at least 63 militants and recaptured the town.	Maute Group	Moro conflict
Nov 28	Vehicular assault, stabbing	0 (+1)	11	Columbus, United States	2016 Ohio State University attack	A student who was a Somali refugee rammed his car into a group of students at the Ohio State University. The perpetrator then stabbed several others before he was killed on the scene.	Abdul Razak Ali Artan	Islamic terrorism
Nov 29	Shooting	7 (+3)	Unknown	Nagrota, India	2016 Nagrota army base attack	Attack on an Indian Army base.	Pakistan sponsored terrorists	Kashmir conflict
Dec 9	Suicide bombings	57 (+2)	177	Madagali, Nigeria	Madagali suicide bombings	2 explosions.	Boko Haram	Boko Haram insurgency
Dec 10	Suicide bombing	50+ (+1)	70+	Aden, Yemen	December 2016 Aden suicide bombings	Soldiers killed.	Islamic State – Yemen Province	Yemeni Civil War
Dec 10	Car bombing, suicide bombing	46 (+2)	155	Istanbul, Turkey	December 2016 Istanbul bombings	Two bombs.	Kurdistan Freedom Falcons	Kurdish–Turkish conflict
Dec 11	Suicide bombing	29 (+1)	50+	Mogadishu, Somalia	December 2016 Mogadishu suicide bombing	Suicide bombing on a police station near the port.	Al-Shabaab	War in Somalia
Dec 11	Suicide bombing	27 (+1)	47	Cairo, Egypt	Botroseya Church bombing	Explosion in a Coptic cathedral.	Islamic State – Sinai Province	Insurgency in Egypt
Dec 16	Shooting	12	Unknown	Nassoumbou, Burkina Faso	2016 Nassoumbou attack	Several dozen heavily armed gunmen attacked an army outpost near the border with Mali.	Ansar ul Islam	Insurgency in the Maghreb
Dec 17	Suicide car bombing	14 (+1)	55	Kayseri, Turkey	2016 Kayseri bombing	A suspected car bombing killed soldiers aboard a bus.	Kurdistan Freedom Falcons	Kurdish–Turkish conflict
Dec 18	Suicide bombing	52+ (+1)	63	Aden, Yemen	December 2016 Aden suicide bombings	Soldiers collecting their salaries at a base were killed when a suicide bomber detonated.	Islamic State – Yemen Province	Yemeni Civil War
Dec 18	Shooting	16 (+5)	37	Al-Karak, Jordan	2016 Al-Karak attack	Insurgents attacked police and civilians then took shelter in Kerak Castle.	Islamic State	Spillover of the Syrian Civil War in Jordan
Dec 19	Assassination	1 (+1)	3	Ankara, Turkey	Assassination of Andrei Karlov	A gunman killed the Russian ambassador to Turkey. Three bystanders were also injured. According to the Egyptian newspaper Al-Youm Al-Sabea, the Army of Conquest claimed responsibility for the assassination.	Army of Conquest	Spillover of the Syrian Civil War in Turkey
Dec 19–23	Vehicular attack, stabbing, and shooting	13 (+1)	55	Berlin, Germany	2016 Berlin truck attack	A truck ploughed into a Christmas market. The perpetrator was found by police in Milan, Italy four days later and was killed in a shootout with police. One officer was wounded.	Islamic State	Islamic terrorism in Europe
Dec 23	Hijacking	0	0	Luqa, Malta	Afriqiyah Airways Flight 209	A commercial jet that took off from Libya was hijacked by individuals with explosives. The plane landed in Malta. The hijackers were pro-Gaddafi militants who demanded recognition of their group.	Brigade 93	Second Libyan Civil War
Dec 28	Bombings	0	33	Hilongos, Philippines	2016 Hilongos bombings	Two bombs at an amateur boxing match.	Bangsamoro Islamic Freedom Fighters (suspected)	Moro conflict
Dec 31	Suicide bombing, bombing	25 (+1)	50	Baghdad, Iraq	December 2016 Baghdad bombings		Islamic State	Iraqi Civil War
