= Ethnic violence and religious persecution linked to the Islamic State =

Ethnic violence and religious persecution linked to ISIS includes organised actions in territory controlled by the movement in their "Islamic State of Iraq and Syria" (2013‑2019) as well as violence they actively incite in territory they do not control. The main religious groups they have targeted are Shia Muslims and Christians, and Yazidis. Their persecution of Yazidis was genocidal.

== Genocides ==
The movement has been accused of committing genocide against multiple ethnic and religious groups.

=== Yazidi genocide ===
The Yazidi genocide also known as the 74th firman by Yazidis, was perpetrated by the Islamic State in Iraq and Syria between 2014 and 2017. It was characterized by massacres, genocidal rape, and forced conversions to Islam. The Yazidis are a Kurdish-speaking people who are indigenous to Kurdistan who practice Yazidism, a monotheistic Iranian ethnoreligion derived from the Indo-Iranian tradition.

Over a period of three years, Islamic State militants trafficked thousands of Yazidi women and girls and killed thousands of Yazidi men. The United Nations reported that the Islamic State killed about 5,000 Yazidis and trafficked about 10,800 Yazidi women and girls in a "forced conversion campaign" throughout Iraq. By 2015, upwards of 71% of the global Yazidi population was displaced by the genocide, with most Yazidi refugees having fled to Iraq's Kurdistan Region and Syria's Rojava. The persecution of Yazidis, along with other religious minorities, took place after the Islamic State's Northern Iraq offensive of June 2014.

Amid numerous atrocities committed by the Islamic State, the Yazidi genocide attracted international attention and prompted the United States to establish CJTF–OIR, a military coalition consisting of many Western countries and Turkey, Morocco, and Jordan. Additionally, the United States, the United Kingdom, and Australia made emergency airdrops to support Yazidi refugees who were trapped in the Sinjar Mountains due to the Islamic State's Northern Iraq offensive of August 2014. During the Sinjar massacre, in which the Islamic State killed and abducted thousands of trapped Yazidis, the United States and the United Kingdom began carrying out airstrikes on the advancing Islamic State militants, while the People's Defense Units and the Kurdistan Workers' Party jointly formed a humanitarian corridor to evacuate the rest of the Yazidi refugees from the Sinjar Mountains.

The United Nations and several other organizations, including the Council of Europe and the European Union, have designated the anti-Yazidi campaign by the Islamic State as a genocide, as have the United States, Canada, Armenia, and Iraq.

=== Iraqi Turkmen genocide ===
The Iraqi Turkmen genocide refers to the series of killings, rapes, executions, expulsions, and sexual slavery of Iraqi Turkmen in Islamic State-controlled territory. The genocide began when IS captured Iraqi Turkmen lands in 2014 and continued until IS lost all of their land in Iraq. In 2017, it was officially recognized as a genocide by the Parliament of Iraq, and in 2018, the sexual slavery was also recognized by the United Nations.

== Destruction of cultural heritage ==
Since 2014, the Islamic State (IS) has destroyed cultural heritage on an unprecedented scale, primarily in Iraq and Syria, but also in Libya. These attacks and demolitions targeted a variety of ancient and medieval artifacts, museums, libraries, and places of worship, among other sites of importance to human history. Between June 2014 and February 2015, the Islamic State's Salafi jihadists plundered and destroyed at least 28 historic religious buildings in Mosul alone. Many of the valuables that were looted during these demolitions were used to bolster the economy of the IS.

== Religious persecution ==
The main targets of religious persecution by the Islamic State are Shia Muslims and Christians.

=== Persecution of Shia Muslims ===
Shia Muslims have been persecuted by the Islamic State (IS), an Islamist extremist terrorist group, since 2014. Persecutions have taken place in Iraq, Syria, and other parts of the world.

Despite being the religious majority in Iraq, Shia Muslims have been killed and otherwise persecuted by IS, which is Sunni. On 12 June 2014, the Islamic State killed 1,700 unarmed Shia Iraqi Army cadet recruits in the Camp Speicher massacre. IS has also targeted Shia prisoners. According to witnesses, after the militant group took the city of Mosul, they divided the Sunni prisoners from the Shia prisoners. Up to 670 Shia prisoners were then taken to another location and executed. Kurdish officials in Erbil reported on the incident of Sunni and Shia prisoners being separated and Shia prisoners being killed after the Mosul prison fell to IS.

IS also targeted Christians and Yazidis in northern Iraq on a "historic scale", putting entire communities "at risk of being wiped off the map of Iraq". In a special report released on 2 September 2014, Amnesty International described how IS had "systematically targeted non-Sunni Muslim communities, killing or abducting hundreds, possibly thousands, of individuals and forcing more than tens of thousands of Shias, Sunnis, along with other minorities to flee the areas it has captured since 10 June 2014". The most targeted Shia groups in Nineveh Governorate were Shia Turkmens and Shabaks.

=== Persecution of Christians ===
The persecution of Christians by the Islamic State involves the systematic mass murder of Christian minorities, within the regions of Iraq, Syria, Egypt, Libya, Democratic Republic of the Congo, Mozambique and Nigeria controlled by the Islamic extremist group Islamic State. Persecution of Christian minorities climaxed following the Syrian civil war and later by its spillover but has since intensified further. Christians have been subjected to massacres, forced conversions, rape, sexual slavery, and the systematic destruction of their historical sites, churches and other places of worship.

According to US diplomat Alberto M. Fernandez, "While the majority of the victims of the conflict which is raging in Syria and Iraq have been Muslims, Christians have borne a heavy burden given their small numbers."

The depopulation of Christians from the Middle East by the Islamic State as well as other organisations and governments has been formally recognised as an ongoing genocide by the United States, European Union, and United Kingdom. Christians remain the most persecuted religious group in the Middle East, and Christians in Iraq are “close to extinction”. According to estimates by the US State Department, the number of Christians in Iraq has fallen from 1.2 million 2011 to 120,000 in 2024, and the number in Syria from 1.5 million to 300,000, falls driven by persecution by terrorist groups and repression by authoritarian regimes.

== List of ISIS attacks on religious targets ==
| Date | Events and locations | | Deaths | Targeted group |
|---|---|---|---|---|
| 25 Mar 2020 | Kabul gurdwara attack | | | Sikhs |
| 18 Jun 2022 | Kabul gurdwara attack | | 2+ (Note: One Sikh worshipper and one other person.) | Sikhs |
| 12 Sep 2024 | Qorodal bus shooting | | | Shia |
| 7 Jul 2016 | Muhammad ibn Ali al-Hadi Mausoleum attack | | | Shia |
| 10 Jun 2014 | Badush prison massacre | | | Shia |
| 11 May 2016 | Baghdad bombings | | | Shia |
| Feb 2015 | Baghdad bombings | | | Shia |
| Jan 2016 | Baghdad–Miqdadiyah attacks | | | Shia |
| 29 Apr 2024 | Guzara attack | | 6 | Shia |
| Nov 2016 | Hillah suicide truck bombing | | | Shia |
| 5 Aug 2022 | Kabul bombing | | | Shia |
| 17 Aug 2019 | Kabul bombing | | | Shia |
| 11 Aug 2024 | Kabul bus bombing | | | Shia, Hazara |
| 28 Dec 2017 | Kabul suicide bombing | | | Shia |
| 22 Apr 2018 | Kabul suicide bombing | | | Shia |
| Mar 2018 | Kabul suicide bombing | | | Shia |
| 2021 | Kandahar bombing | | | Shia |
| 2016 | Karrada bombing | | | Shia |
| 2016 | Al-Kazimiyya Mosque bombing | | | Shia |
| 2015 | Khan Bani Saad bombing | | | Shia |
| 2021 | Kunduz mosque bombing | | | Shia |
| 2022 | Mazar-i-Sharif mosque bombing | | | Shia |
| 2022 | Mazar-i-Sharif minivan bombings | | | Shia |
| 2024 | Muscat mosque shooting | | | Shia |
| 14 Sep 2017 | Nasiriyah attacks | | 84 (Note: +4 attackers) | Shia |
| 13 Oct 2023 | Pul-i-Khumri bombing | | 7 | Shia |
| 29 May 2015 | Dammam mosque bombing | | 4 | Shia |
| 22 May 2015 | Qatif mosque bombing | | 22 | Shia |
| 13 May 2016 | Real Madrid fan club massacres | Two different fan club locations | 16+ | Shia, fans of Real Madrid |
| 29 May 2016 | Real Madrid fan club massacres | Two different fan club locations | 12+ (Note: +1 bomber) | Shia, fans of Real Madrid |
| Feb 2016 | Sadr City bombings | | | Shia |
| Jan 2017 | Sadr City bombings | | | Shia |
| 26 Oct 2022 | Shah Cheragh attack | | | Shia |
| 2 Mar 2024 | Stabbing in Zurich | | | Jewish |
| 14 Dec 2025 | Bondi Beach shooting | | 15 (Note: 15 victims: 12 Jewish; 2 Catholic; 1 unknown; Plus 1 attacker) | Jewish |
| 2024 | Dagestan attacks | | 5 (Note: plots 17 responders and 5 attackers) | Jewish |
| 2024 | Dagestan attacks | | 5 | Christian |
| 2 Oct 2025 | Manchester synagogue attack | | 2 (Note: plus the attacker) | Jewish |

=== Ethnic or religiously identified armed groups ===
| Date | Event | Deaths | Targeted group |
|---|---|---|---|
| Jun 2017 (disputed) | Disputed attack on an Israeli soldier | 1 | Israel Defense Forces soldier. |
| 12 Jun 2014 | Camp Speicher massacre | 1,095 | Shia, Iraqi Army cadets (unarmed) |

== See also ==
- Battle of Yarmouk Camp (December 2012)
- Battle of Yarmouk Camp (2015)
- Destruction of cultural heritage by the Islamic State
- Human rights in Islamic State-controlled territory
- List of massacres during the Syrian civil war
- List of terrorist incidents linked to the Islamic State
- Massacres committed by the Islamic State of Iraq and the Levant
- Persecution of Copts
