= Timeline of the War in Iraq (2016) =

This is a timeline of events during the War in Iraq in 2016.

== Chronology ==
=== January ===
- January 11 - The Islamic State launched a series of deadly suicide attacks in Baghdad and Miqdadiyah, which resulted in the deaths of 132 Shi'ite civilians across Baghdad, Miqdadiyah, and the town of Sharaban in northern Diyala.
- January 27 - The Islamic State set off up to 12 car bombs in the city of Ramadi, the capital of al-Anbar Province, which attacked the 10th Iraqi Army division in two separate attacks, one of which attacked the headquarters of the 10th Division in northern Ramadi. The attack led to the deaths of 55 elements of the Iraqi Security Forces and pro-government Sunni tribal fighters.

=== February ===
- February 2 – The beginning of the Siege of Fallujah (2016).
- February 19 – Preparations for the Hīt offensive (2016).

=== March ===
- March 6 – 2016 Hillah suicide truck bombing: A suicide bomber killed at least 60 people and wounded 70 others after ramming his explosive-laden truck into a security checkpoint at one of the entrances to the Iraqi city of Hillah, south of Baghdad. The Islamic State of Iraq and the Levant claimed responsibility for the bombing.
- March 24 – Iraqi forces launch an offensive to recapture the Al-Shirqat District from ISIL
- March 25 – Iskandariya suicide bombing: A suicide bomber blew himself up in a crowd after a local football game in a village near Iskandariya, in a mixed Sunni-Shi'ite area, killing at least 30 people and wounding more than 65. The mayor of the town was among those killed in the explosion, he succumbed to his wounds in a hospital. The Islamic State of Iraq and the Levant claimed responsibility for the bombing.
- March 27 – Iraqi Yazidis and tribal fighters (part of Iraq's military) had taken control of an area between Sinjar and the border of Syria from ISIL. This is along the main highway (and key ISIL supply line) between Mosul, Iraq and ash-Shaddadi, Syria, which the predominantly Kurdish-led Syrian Democratic Forces had captured from the Islamic State in February. An alternative connection, that also requires this highway, would be to Al Hasakah, Syria, slightly north.
- March 29 – A suicide bomb attack kills at least seven people and wounds another 23 in Baghdad. A police officer says the suicide bomber set off his payload among a group of day labourers in Baghdad's Tayaran Square. The Islamic State of Iraq and the Levant claimed responsibility for the attack in an online statement circulated by supporters, saying it targeted Shiite militiamen.

=== April ===
- April 2 – Iraqi Security Forces freed a large number of prisoners from an underground ISIL-operated jail in the city of Hīt. Malallah al-Obeidi, a local official in the Al Anbar Governorate, put the number of freed prisoners at around 1,500, saying most of them were civilians.

=== May ===
- May 1 – 2016 Samawa bombing: In a rare attack in Iraq's mostly Shi'ite south, a twin suicide bombing killed at least 33 people and wounded 75 in the city of Samawah, Muthanna Governorate. The Islamic State of Iraq and the Levant claimed responsibility.
- May 13 – Real Madrid Fan Club massacre: A group of ISIL militants attacked the headquarters of a supporters club of the Spanish football club Real Madrid C.F. in Balad District, north of Baghdad. At least 16 people were killed in the attack.
- May 18 – Iraq's Prime Minister, Haider al-Abadi, announced that the Iraqi Army and PMF had liberated the town of Rutbah, in al-Anbar Province, after a four-day long battle with ISIS. The liberation of Rutbah had been viewed as strategically important, as it lies 150 km east of the Al Waleed border crossing with Syria, and 250 km south of the town of Al-Qa'im.
- May 22 – Beginning of the Third Battle of Fallujah.

=== June ===
- 27 June – The Iraqi Army enters the outskirts of Fallujah in the last phase of the Battle of Fallujah
- 29 June – The Iraqi Air Force heavily bombs ISIS vehicles retreating from Fallujah

=== August ===
- 21 August – An Iraqi F-16 fighter jet bombed the city of Mosul. The attack left 10 Islamic State fighters dead.
- 21 August – At least 30 fighters from Islamic State were killed by security forces in Ramadi.
- 25 August –
  - Qayyarah is liberated from ISIS to allow for a future offensive on Mosul.
  - Iraq's parliament dismisses Sunni Defense Minister Khalid al Obeidi after investigations supported by former Prime Minister Nouri al-Maliki’s bloc.
- 27 August – An airstrike killed 12 Islamic State insurgents in Sadia village.
- 28 August – One Islamic State leader dies in an airstrike in Mosul.
- 28 August – Clashes left 2 ISIS terrorists dead in Hawija.
- 29 August – 5 ISIS fighters die in an airstrike in Anbar province.
- 30 August – An airstrike left 4 Islamic State terrorists dead.

=== September ===
- 3 September – At least 18 terrorists from Islamic State died in an airstrike in Anbar province.
- 4 September – Kurdish fighters killed at least 7 Islamic State insurgents in Tal Afar.
- 4 September – Security forces killed at least 2 Islamic State insurgents.
- 5 September – The Islamic State of Iraq and the Levant bans burqas in northern Iraq after a series of fatal attacks on its members by veiled women.
- 18 September – A bloc of 70 Iraqi parliamentarians announces plans to introduce a draft law granting immunity to the Popular Mobilisation Forces.
- 21 September – Kurdish Finance Minister Hoshiyar Zebari is dismissed from Prime Minister Abadi's cabinet by parliament.
- 22 September – the Iraqi Army recaptures Al-Shirqat entirely along with several other villages.

=== October ===
- 4 October – Operations by the Iraqi Air Force killed at least 40 militants from the Islamic State. Per Popular Mobilization Forces command in al-Anbar, airstrikes belonging to IS forces in western al-Anbar province were bombed by the Iraqi Air Force.
- 5 October
  - A sortie from the United States Air Force bombed an Islamic State target, killing 10. The airstrike occurred in the vicinity of al-Qayyarah, south of the IS-controlled city of Mosul.
  - U.S. officials confirmed the presence of sulfur mustard agent on Islamic State munitions.
- 6 October – Four Islamic State militants were shot dead in al-Qa'im.
- 8 October – A U.S.-led coalition airstrike near Ramadi resulted in the deaths of 7 Islamic State militants.
- 11 October – A U.S.-led coalition airstrike inside the city of Mosul resulted in the deaths of 8 Islamic State militants.
- 15 October -
  - An airstrike by the U.S.-led international coalition in southern Nineveh Province resulted in the deaths of five Islamic State militants and at least seven more wounded. According to Iraqi media outlet al-Sumaira, one of the dead included the Islamic State's head of its suicide drone brigade.
  - Islamic State carried out coordinated bombings and shootings in Baghdad, killing 79+ civilians, and injuring at least 91+ people.
- 16 October – Iraqi Prime Minister Haider al-Abadi announced the start of the offensive on the city of Mosul; with Iraqi Ground Forces beginning artillery fire on Islamic State targets in the city of Mosul, aided by ISR and airstrikes from the U.S.-led International Coalition.
- 17 October – The main assault on Islamic State controlled Mosul was launched at 6 a.m.; with the Peshmerga advancing on Mosul from the east, and Iraqi Security Forces advancing from the south; 200 km^{2} was retaken throughout the day with help from the U.S.-led International Coalition.
- 19 October – 21 Islamic State militants were killed by Iraqi Federal Police in the village of Bojwana, near Mosul.
- 20 October – A senior leader from the Islamic State called "Aziz Ali" was killed in an airstrike in the village of Tel al-Sheer by the Iraqi Air Force, per the press office of the Popular Mobilization Forces.
- 21 October – A large raid on the city of Kirkuk was launched by the Islamic State in an attempt to relieve pressure on its forces in the city of Mosul, divert attention to the city of Kirkuk, and retaliate for the participation of the Peshmerga in the Battle of Mosul.
- 24 October – According to the deputy commander of the Peshmerga in Sinjar, Brigadier General "Sami Mulla Mohammed Bowseli", At least 15 Islamic State militants were killed in clashes with Peshmerga forces inside the city of Sinjar after a failed Islamic State assault east of the city of Sinjar, with 7 SVBIEDs (suicide vehicle-borne improvised explosive devices) destroyed by Peshmerga forces. Peshmerga forces also announced that they've ousted the Islamic State from the city of Kirkuk.
- 25 October – Per the commander of al-Anbar operations, Major General "Ismail Mahlawi", 40 militants from the Islamic State were killed in the district of ar-Rutbah, in western al-Anbar Province, under a combination of strikes from the U.S.-led International Coalition, Iraqi Air Force, and Iraqi Ground Forces, adding that the district of ar-Rutbah was "fully liberated", under the security control of the Iraqi Army's "1st and 8th regiments", and families from ar-Rutbah were evacuated to an unspecified IDP camp to search for any Islamic State cells and clear ar-Rutbah of all Islamic State cells.

=== November ===
- 3 November –
  - Fighting around Mosul displaced around 8,000 people, marking the largest spike in displacement since the offensive began.
  - Kurdish security forces demolished homes of Sunni Arab residents in Kirkuk in retaliation for the 21 October ISIS attack on Kirkuk City.
- 6 November – ISIS launched coordinated attacks in Tikrit and Samarra targeting Shi’a civilians, including Iranian pilgrims visiting for a Shi’a religious holiday.
- 8 November – Iraqi Security Forces and Peshmerga forces continued with their major gains in eastern Mosul, as well as areas north and south of the city, maintaining momentum in the anti-ISIS offensive.
- 17 November – The Islamic State claims responsibility for a suicide car bombing at a wedding in Amiriyat Fallujah, Anbar province, reportedly killing at least 30 people.
- 21 November – The Iraqi Counter Terrorism Service captured a media office used by IS in eastern Mosul, pushing further westward in the campaign to retake the city from the Islamic State.
- 23 November – A wave of Islamic State bombings occurred in and around Baghdad, killing 31 people and injuring over 100.
- 24 November – A suicide truck bombing targeted Shia pilgrims at a petrol station in Hillah, about 100 km south of Baghdad. The attack killed at least 125 people and injured many more.
- 26 November – The Iraqi parliament had passed a law recognizing the Popular Mobilization Forces as an official part of the Iraqi Armed Forces, granting them full legal status under the authority of the Prime Minister.

== See also ==
- 2016 in Iraq
- Terrorist incidents in Iraq in 2016
- Timeline of ISIL-related events (2016)
