= October 2016 Baghdad attacks =

Terrorist attacks that took place in Baghdad, Iraq

2016 October Baghdad attacks
- Part of the War in Iraq (2013–2017)
- Location: Baghdad, Iraq
- Date: 15 October 2016 (AST)
- Target: Shi'ite Muslims, policemen
- Weapons: Suicide bomb, guns
- Deaths: 79+ (not including at least eight attackers)
- Injuries: 91+
- Perpetrator: Islamic State
- Motive: Anti-Shiism

On 15 October 2016, four attacks in and around Baghdad, Iraq, resulted in the deaths of at least 60 victims and at least seven attackers, while injuring at least 80 more people. The Islamic State (IS) are believed to be behind the suicide bombing and two mass shootings.

== Events ==
The first attack occurred when a funeral was being held for a local resident in the al-Shaab district of Baghdad inside a tent. People were taking part in Shi'ite rituals, where they mourn the killing of the Islamic prophet Muhammad's grandson Husayn ibn Ali, which occurred during the 7th century. When they were doing this, a suicide bomber wearing an explosive vest blew himself up in the middle of the gathering, killing at least 44 people and injuring at least 57. IS claimed this attack.

The second attack happened in Mutaibija, Tikrit, when gunmen opened fire on policemen, killing eight of them and injuring eleven. Three attackers were also killed.

The third attack in Ishaq occurred when gunmen stormed the house of the Ishaqi Mobilization militia leader Numan al-Mujamaie, killing his wife and three children, but al-Mujamaie was not present. They later killed themselves with explosive belts when they were pursued by police.

A fourth later attack, a suicide bombing on a tent where Shia Muslims distribute food, killed at least four people and injured at least 12.

More attacks occurred the next day, killing at least 19 people, injuring at least 11, and killing another suicide bomber.

The attacks occurred during the preparation for the Battle for Mosul. A failed rebellion occurred in Mosul on the day of the attack, and IS reportedly executed 58 people, and later 14 more. The attacks were the deadliest in Baghdad since the 2016 Karrada bombing in July 2016.

== See also ==
- 2016 Karrada bombing
- 9 September 2016 Baghdad bombings
- Muhammad ibn Ali al-Hadi Mausoleum attack
- List of Islamist terrorist attacks
- List of terrorist incidents in July 2016
- Terrorist incidents in Iraq in 2016
