= Terrorist incidents in Iraq in 2016 =

This article lists terrorist incidents in Iraq during 2016:

== January ==
- January 11 - At least 50 people were killed in a spate of attacks in Baghdad. IS claimed responsibility.
- January 27 - 2016 Ramadi bombing: Up to a dozen car bombs were set off in the city of Ramadi. The blast killed 55 Iraqi soldiers and pro-government tribal fighters

== February ==
- February 4 - At least 28 killed in attacks in Ramadi and Fallujah.
- February 8 - 2016 Mosul massacre
- February 28 - February 2016 Baghdad bombings
- February 29 - 38 killed at a Shia funeral in Muqdadiya.

== March ==
- March 6 - A suicide bomber kills at least 60 people and wounds 70 others after ramming his explosives-laden truck into a security checkpoint at one of the entrances to the Iraqi city of Hillah, south of Baghdad.
- March 25 - Iskandariya suicide bombing - 29 killed in a bombing of a football stadium south of Badghdad.
- March 29 - At least 3 people die and another 27 were injured in a suicide bombing attack in Baghdad. The Islamic State claimed responsibility for the attack.

== April ==
- April 4 - A suicide bomber blew himself up on a street killing five people and wounding five others in the southern city of Basra.
- April 4 - A suicide bomber blew himself up inside a restaurant that is frequented by Shiite paramilitary militia fighters, killing at least 14 people.
- April 4 - Earlier in the day, a suicide bomber rammed his car into a security checkpoint in the capital's northeastern suburb of Sadr al-Qanat, killing six troops and wounding 13 others.
- April 4 - Another suicide car bomber hit a headquarters of paramilitary troops in the town of Mishahda, 20 miles (30 kilometers) north of Baghdad, killing four troops and wounding 10 others.
- April 9 - A bomb killed one and 3 people were injured in Diyala Province
- April 9 - In Sabaa al-Bour a bomb killed at least 2 people and another 8 were injured.

== May ==
- May 1 - At least 33 people died in a bombing in Samawa.
- May 11 - At least 62 people died in a truck bombing in Bagdad.
- May 13 - Real Madrid fan club massacres.
- May 15 - 2016 Iraq Gas Plant attack.
- May 17 - May 2016 Baghdad bombings.

== June ==
- June 4 - Bombings in and around Baghdad kill 15.

== July ==
- July 2 - Karrada bombings kill at least 308 people.
- July 24 - Kadhimiya Baghdad bombing kills at least 21 people.

== November ==
- November 24 - A truck bomb attack in Hillah killed at least 100 people.

== See also ==
- List of terrorist incidents, 2016
- Terrorist incidents in Iraq in 2015
- Terrorist incidents in Iraq in 2014
- Terrorist incidents in Iraq in 2013
- List of bombings during the Iraq War
