= 2016 Mohmand mosque bombing =

2016 suicide bombing in Pakistan

Coordinates: 34°30′57″N 71°23′51″E

2016 September Pakistan mosque bombing
- Part of the War in North-West Pakistan
- Location: Butmaina, Mohmand Agency, Pakistan
- Date: 16 September 2016
- Attack type: Suicide bombing
- Weapon: Bomb
- Deaths: 36
- Injuries: 34
- Perpetrators: Jamaat-ul-Ahrar, a faction of Tehrik-i-Taliban Pakistan
- Motive: Terrorism

On 16 September 2016, a bombing in a mosque left 36 people dead and 34 injured. The bombing comes only a few days after another one that killed at least 14 people and wounded 60.

== See also ==
- List of Islamist terrorist attacks
- 8 August 2013 Quetta bombing
- January 2016 Quetta suicide bombing
- List of terrorist incidents in September 2016
- Terrorist incidents in Pakistan in 2016
- August 2016 Quetta attacks
