= Hurghada attack =

Hurghada attack may refer to:

- 2016 Hurghada attack
- 2017 Hurghada attack
