= 2015 Qamishli bombings =

Terrorist attack in Syria

- Location of Qamishli in Syria
- Location: Qamishli, Al-Hasakah Governorate, Syria
- Date: 30 December 2015
- Target: Assyrian Christians
- Attack type: Backpack bombs or suicide bombings
- Deaths: 16+
- Injuries: 35+
- Perpetrator: Unknown
- No. of participants: 3

The 2015 Qamishli bombings, which occurred on December 30, involved three explosions that targeted different restaurants in an Assyrian neighborhood in Qamishli, Syria. At least one was confirmed as a suicide bombing, and the other two were believed to be similar attacks. A total of 16 people were killed, including 14 Assyrian Christians and 2 Muslims, with 35 others wounded. Shortly after the attacks, the Islamic State claimed responsibility. Assyrian organisations claimed that the bombings were not likely a deed by the Islamic State, but possibly a crime by the Kurdish YPG.

== Aftermath ==
In the aftermath of the bombings, the Sootoro set up security checkpoints around the perimeter of the al-Wusta neighborhood.

On 12 January 2016, at around 12:45, hundreds of Kurdish YPG fighters riding in 30 vehicles approached 500 Sootoro fighters at the checkpoint and demanded that they close it, stating that the checkpoints bothered residents. When the Sootoro refused, a YPG gunner opened fire from a machine gun mounted on a technical vehicle, striking a Sootoro fighter in the head and killing him instantly. The Sootoro fired back, killing 3 YPG fighters. A further 2 Sootoro fighters were wounded. 3 civilians were injured in the cross-fire. The fighting ended with a ceasefire.

== See also ==
- July 2016 Qamishli bombings
- List of terrorist incidents in 2015
- May 2016 Jableh and Tartous bombings
