= July 2016 Qamishli bombings =

Car bombings

- Part of the Syrian Kurdish-Islamist conflict (2013-present)
- Location of Qamishli in Syria
- Location: 37°03′N 41°13′E; Qamishli, al-Hasakah Governorate, Syria
- Date: 27 July 2016
- Target: Civilian
- Attack type: Car bombing
- Weapon: Car bombs
- Deaths: 57 (8 Asayish and 44 civilians)
- Injuries: 171+
- Perpetrator: Islamic State

The July 2016 Qamishli bombings were a twin car bombing in a Rojavan-held district in the city of Qamishli, part of the al-Hasakah Governorate in Syria. The bombings killed more than 44 and more than 171 were wounded. The Islamic State of Iraq and the Levant claimed responsibility. The city of Qamishli has been the site of multiple car bombings since 2015.

== The bombings ==
On 27 July 2016, a livestock truck carrying explosives and a motorcycle headed toward the western part of the city on the road between an Asayish conscription center and a crowded farmers' market and exploded. The blasts leveled several buildings, destroyed several cars, and sent a mushroom cloud of smoke into the air which were seen by residents of the Turkish city of Nusaybin across the border, and the blast was heard by residents a few miles away. The first explosion caused a gas cylinder and an electric generator to explode.

At least 44 people were killed and more than 171 wounded. Dozens were trapped under rubble and the hospitals in the city were immediately calling for donations of blood of all types.

The Islamic State of Iraq and the Levant claimed responsibility for the bombings, saying that they are in retaliation for the recent coalition bombings against their forces in Manbij City. The bombings included a suicide car bomb and a motorcycle bomb. They occurred near the border with Turkey. The targets of the bombing were the local Kurdish police force and a government building. At least 50 people were killed and around 140 injured.

== See also ==
- 2015 Qamishli bombings
- List of terrorist incidents in July 2016
- Timeline of the Syrian Civil War
- May 2016 Jableh and Tartous bombings
