= August 2016 Quetta attacks =

Terror attack in Pakistan

- Part of the Insurgency in Balochistan
- Location of Balochistan in Pakistan
- Location: Quetta, Balochistan, Pakistan
- Date: 8 August 2016
- Attack type: Suicide bombing, Shooting
- Weapons: Explosives, Automatic Rifle
- Deaths: 70 to 94+
- Injuries: 120+
- Perpetrators: Jamaat-ul-Ahrar, a splinter faction of Pakistani Taliban (claimed responsibility); The Khorasan Province of the Islamic State (claimed responsibility)

On 8 August 2016, terrorists attacked the Government Hospital of Quetta in Pakistan with a suicide bombing and shooting. They killed more than 70 people, mainly lawyers, and injured more than 130 others. The fatalities were mainly lawyers who had assembled at the hospital where the body of Advocate Bilal Anwar Kasi, the president of the Balochistan Bar Association, had been brought after he was assassinated by an unknown gunman. Responsibility for the attack has been claimed by various Islamist groups like Jamaat-ul-Ahrar and the Islamic State – Khorasan Province. Between 70 and 94 people were killed and over 120 injured. 54 of those killed were lawyers.

On 6 December 2016, the mastermind of the attack, Jehangir Badini, was killed in Pishin during an operation by security forces.

== Incident ==
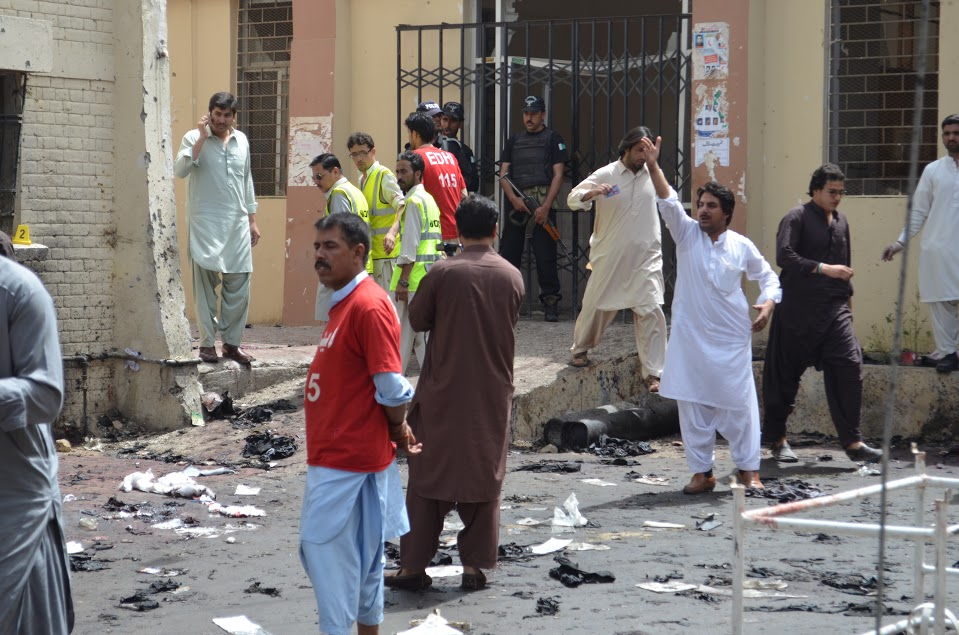
Rescue after the attack.

Advocate Bilal Anwar Kasi, 46, the president of the Balochistan Bar Association, was attacked on the morning of 8 August near Mengal Chowk on Manno Jan Road while leaving his home for his office. His dead body was brought to the Government Hospital for autopsy and many advocates assembled there. A suspected suicide bombing took place inside the hospital, which was followed by gunfire resulting in fatalities and injuries.

Police and Frontier Corps took over the area after the attack and an emergency was declared in the hospitals of Quetta. Mobile phone jammers were activated in the hospital area. The Bomb Disposal Squad reported that 8 to 9 kilograms of explosives were used in the attack. Two journalists, one from Aaj News and the other from Dawn News, died in the Quetta Civil Hospital attack while working.

=== Perpetrators ===
Both the Jamat ul-Ahrar and the Islamic State's Khorasan Province claimed responsibility for the attack. Initially, Islamic State – Khorasan Province claimed the responsibility for the attack stating that "A martyr from the Islamic State detonated his explosive belt at a gathering of justice ministry employees and Pakistani policemen in the city of Quetta". However, Jamaat-ul-Ahrar, a splinter group of the Pakistani militant group Tehrik-i-Taliban Pakistan, also claimed credit for the attack on advocate Kasi and the hospital. The group threatened that more attacks would take place "until the imposition of an Islamic system in Pakistan".

ISPR quoted Army Chief Raheel Sharif as saying that the attack was targeting China-Pakistan Economic Corridor (CPEC).

== Reactions ==
=== Domestic ===
Prime Minister Nawaz Sharif and President Mamnoon Hussain condemned the attack and expressed their grief over the loss. The government announced a three-day mourning period during which the National Flag of Pakistan remained at half staff on government buildings.

Consequent to the attack, a scheduled meeting was held to review the implementation of the National Action Plan and it was decided that a task force consisting of senior officials from the security agencies of both the federal and provincial governments, will be established to monitor the progress. Several politicians, including Balochistan Chief Minister Sanaullah Zehri, Interior Minister Sarfraz Bugti, former president Pervez Musharraf, National Security adviser Sartaj Aziz, Pakistan Foreign Ministry spokesman Nafees Zakaria accused the Indian intelligence agency Research and Analysis Wing (RAW) and Afghanistan's intelligence agency National Directorate of Security (NDS) of orchestrating the attack. The accusations reiterated past Pakistani claims of Indian involvement in Balochistan. Pakistan's military establishment said that the threat to internal security was morphing due to a nexus between hostile foreign intelligence agencies and local militant groups.

However, Pakhtunkhwa Milli Awami Party (PkMAP) chief Mahmood Khan Achakzai, Jamiat Ulema-e-Islam (F) Chief Maulana Fazlur Rehman and Muhammad Khan Sherani and Leader of opposition in Pakistani Senate, Chaudhry Aitzaz Ahsan alleged that the government was trying to save itself from any responsibility by blaming foreign agencies and contending that it was a failure of Pakistani Intelligence Agencies demanded sacking of officials if perpetrators are not caught.

The provincial government announced a compensation of Rs 10 million for each deceased person's family and Rs 5 million for each of the seriously injured. The medical and associated expenses of those admitted to Combined Military Hospital (CMH), Quetta and Aga Khan University Hospital, Karachi were also to be borne by the government. According to the victims, the government was not doing enough for their care. Punjab chief minister, Shahbaz Sharif, gave Rs 0.5 million to the family of each deceased and Rs 250,000 to each of the injured. An education fund was established by Balochistan Chief Minister Sanaullah Zehri for the children of the victims.

=== International ===
United Nations Secretary General Ban Ki-moon, United States White House Press Secretary Josh Earnest Afghan President Ashraf Ghani and French President François Hollande all condemned the attack. The Pakistan and England cricket teams observed a minute of silence before the start of their fourth test match. Both teams wore black armbands in solidarity with the victims.

Social networking website Facebook activated its Safety Check feature enabling people to mark themselves as safe.

== See also ==
- List of terrorist incidents linked to Islamic State – Khorasan Province
- List of Islamist terrorist attacks
- 8 August 2013 Quetta bombing
- January 2016 Quetta suicide bombing
- October 2016 Quetta attacks
- List of terrorist incidents in August 2016
- Terrorist incidents in Pakistan in 2016
