= 2016 Al-Kazimiyya Mosque bombing =

2016 terrorist attack in Iraq

Al-Kazimiyya Mosque bombing
- Part of War in Iraq (2013–2017)
- Location: 33.33°N 44.43°E; Kadhimiya, Baghdad, Iraq
- Date: 30 April 2016
- Target: Shia pilgrims
- Attack type: Suicide car bombing
- Weapon: Bombs
- Deaths: 38
- Injuries: 86
- Perpetrator: Islamic State

On 30 April 2016, at least 38 people were killed and 86 others wounded, as a result of two car bombings in Baghdad, the capital of Iraq. The Islamic State claimed responsibility for the attack.

== Bombing ==
On 30 April 2016, a car exploded in southeastern Baghdad, targeting Shia pilgrims that were walking to the Al-Kazimiyya Mosque. It resulted in at least 38 deaths and 86 other wounded, according to local police officials. Other government security officials suggested the target was an open-air market.

== See also ==
- 2015–16 Iraqi protests
- List of terrorist incidents, January–June 2016
- Terrorist incidents in Iraq in 2016
