= 2016 Arish attack =

Terrorist incident in Egypt

Attack Al-Arish 2016
- Part of Sinai insurgency
- Location: Arish, North Sinai Governorate, Egypt
- Deaths: 13
- Injuries: 0
- Victims: Soldiers and policemen
- Perpetrators: Islamic State; Sinai Province

Location on the Sinai Peninsula of the three cities attacked in January 2015 by Wilayat Sinai.

The 2016 el Arish attack was a mortar attack by ISIS on March 20, 2016 in which thirteen Egyptian policemen and soldiers were killed at a security checkpoint in Sinai's Al-Arish.

According to the Egyptian Ministry of Interior, the mortar attack targeted Al-Safa checkpoint and at least 13 police officers and soldiers died.

== See also ==
- October 2014 Sinai attacks
- July 2015 Sinai attacks
- Sinai insurgency
- List of terrorist incidents, January–June 2016
