= 2016 Karrada bombing =

2016 bombing in Karrada, Iraq

Coordinates: 33°17′47″N 44°25′13″E

July 2016 Karrada bombing
- Part of the War in Iraq (2013–2017) and the Persecution of Shias by the Islamic State
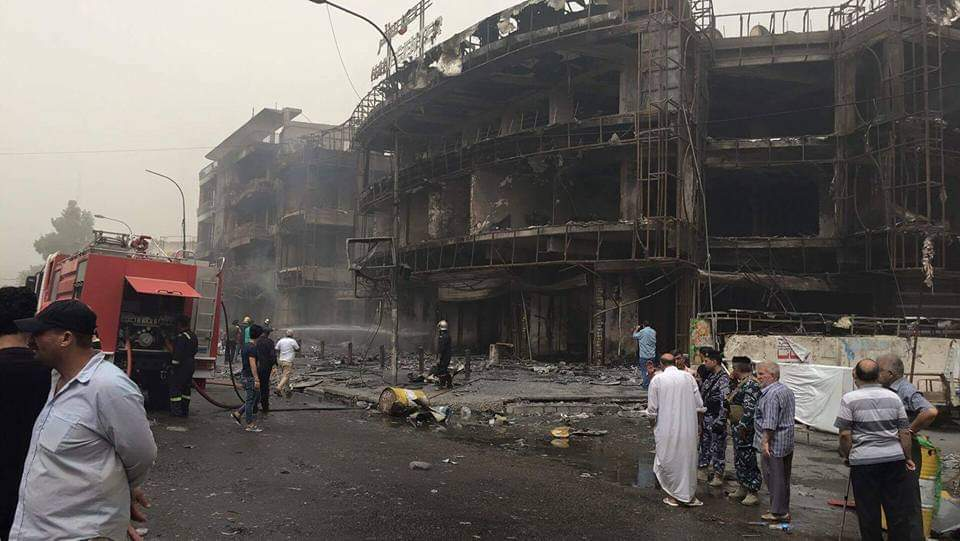
- Aftermath of the bombing, with first responders extinguishing fires
- Location: Karrada, Baghdad, Iraq
- Date: 3 July 2016; 10 years ago 00:05 AST (UTC+03)
- Target: Western-style shopping centre in a multicultural & multi-faith district of Baghdad.
- Attack type: Truck bombing, suicide bombing
- Deaths: 347
- Injuries: 250+
- Perpetrator: Islamic State
- Motive: Loss of Fallujah

On 3 July 2016, Islamic State (IS) militants carried out coordinated bomb attacks in Baghdad that killed up to 1,000 civilians and injured hundreds more. A few minutes after midnight local time (2 July, 21:00 UTC), a suicide truck-bomb targeted the mainly Shia district of Karrada, busy with late night shoppers for Ramadan. A second roadside bomb was detonated in the suburb of Sha'ab, killing at least five.

IS issued a statement claiming responsibility for the attack, naming the suicide bomber as Abu Maha al-Iraqi. There were reports that the source of the blast was a refrigerator van packed with explosives. The explosion caused a huge fire on the main street. Several buildings, including the popular Hadi Center, were badly damaged.

On 18 October 2021, Prime Minister of Iraq Mustafa Al-Kadhimi announced that Ghazwan al-Zawbaee, the man behind the bombing was arrested by Iraqi security forces.

== Background ==
The 17 May 2016 Baghdad bombings, which killed over 101 people, were perpetrated by IS. Some security analysts saw the bombings in Iraq's capital as an effort to distract the attention of the Iraqi security forces from the then-ongoing battle in Fallujah. The 2016 Battle of Fallujah came to a close on 29 June with the Iraqi government recapturing the city from IS.

The Baghdad bombings were the third mass killing of civilians by IS militants in that past week, following the 28 June attack in Istanbul, Turkey, and the 1 July attack in Dhaka, Bangladesh. ISIL had sent out calls for increased attacks during the month long celebration of Ramadan.

== Attack and response ==
The suicide truck bomb hit a shopping area in the upper class Shia-majority district of Karrada, where many people were on the street during the evening shopping and breaking their Ramadan fast with iftar at local cafes. The bomb was concealed inside a refrigerator truck driven by a suicide bomber. It was the first major attack in Baghdad since the Iraqi government's recapture of the city of Fallujah just four days prior. A Western security source in Baghdad told the BBC the bomb used "a new tactic which helped it to move undetected through checkpoints ... We've never seen it before, and it's very worrying." The bombers reportedly used a "unique" mix of chemicals for the bomb. "We are used to big fires but the chemicals in this bomb were used for the first time in Iraq," according to Brigadier General Kadhim Bashir Saleh of the Iraqi Civil Defense Force.

The initial death toll directly due to the bombing had been "limited", but the fire caused by the bombing trapped people in shopping centres, which lacked any emergency exits. The bombing killed at least 324 people and injured at least 223. Unconfirmed reports state that the car bombs may have passed checkpoints where Iraqi security forces still use fake bomb detectors such as the ADE 651.

In the aftermath of the attack, Baghdad Operations Command claimed it had arrested members of a militant cell who were connected to the bombing.

On 28 August 2023, the government of Iraq announced that three members of IS had been executed by hanging for the terrorist attack. Among those reportedly executed was the supposed mastermind of the attack, Ghazwan al-Zawbaee.

=== Other attacks ===
A second roadside explosion occurred in the neighborhood of Sha'ab in northern Baghdad around midnight, killing at least five people and injuring 16.

A third bombing targeted members of al-Hashd al-Shaabi, killing one person and injuring five as well as damaging a vehicle. The bomb was an IED that detonated in Abu Ghraib District in Baghdad. A vehicle was also damaged.

A fourth bombing in al-Latifiya in southern Baghdad killed one person. The bomb was placed under a civilian vehicle, and went off when the vehicle was being driven.

== Casualties ==
The Iraqi Ministry of Defence first stated that at least 167 had been killed and over 180 injured. Reports from the scene indicated that many of those killed were children. After initial reports, the death toll continued to rise as further corpses were recovered from the rubble and injured victims died of their injuries.

Later, in 2021, in an interview with Iraqi News Channel Al-Mirbad, Juma Inad, Minister of Defence at the time of this bombing, claimed the true death toll to be 1,000. He also discredited claims that "only 200/250 were killed".

Abdel Ghani Saadon, the general manager of Rusafa Health Directorate, issued a statement noting that the "hospitals of al-Kandi, al-Sadr and Sheikh Zayed received 138 wounded and 70 dead bodies of al-Karrada bombing". He noted that fifty bodies were burned beyond recognition, and that samples from them had been sent for DNA testing to determine their identities.

== Responsibility ==
The Islamic State issued a statement claiming that it was responsible for the attack and that it had deliberately targeted Shia Muslims, further identifying the suicide bomber as Abu Maha al-Iraqi.

Jasim al-Bahadli, a former army officer and security analyst in Baghdad, stated that the attack was an IS attempt to "compensate for their humiliating defeat in Falluja".

== Reactions ==
=== Domestic ===
==== Political ====
The Iraqi Prime Minister Haider al-Abadi visited the scene of the attack on the following day, and was met by angry crowds shouting "thief" and "dog". They were angry about what they perceived as the government's false promises regarding tightened security. One local shop owner was quoted as stating "Thank God I managed to hit Abadi with stones to take revenge for the kids". Abadi stated that he will punish the perpetrators of the bombings. He also announced a public mourning that will last three days.

After reporting in their most recent death toll, the Iraqi Ministry of Defence issued a statement admitting they were overwhelmed, with not enough resources, military checkpoints, and intelligence services to properly manage the security of Baghdad.

On 5 July, Interior Minister Mohammed Al-Ghabban resigned his post. The Interior ministry is responsible for police but not other forces providing security in Baghdad. In his resignation statement, al-Ghabban said that the security system was "fundamentally flawed" and called for changes to increase the ministry's power. Lieutenant General Abdulamir al-Shimmari, the head of Baghdad Operations Command, along with the Interior Ministry head of intelligence in Baghdad and the official responsible for Baghdad in the national security adviser's office were removed from their posts by al-Abadi. Five convicts were executed and 40 suspected jihadists were arrested following the attack.

According to the Rudaw Media Network, the bombing was "politically disastrous" for the Iraqi government, which had presented the recapture of Fallujah as a step that would make Baghdad less vulnerable to such attacks, as Abadi said that the attacks originated in Fallujah. Seeing that Baghdad was still vulnerable to such attacks, the population of the city could, according to Rudaw, be less supportive of diverting manpower to liberating Mosul.

==== Religious ====
Iraq's leading Sunni religious organisation, the Association of Muslim Scholars, called the bombing a "bloody crime, regardless of who carried it out or what their motivations were". A representative of Iraq's top Shia cleric Grand Ayatollah Ali al-Sistani, Ahmed al-Safi, paid a visit to the site of the bombings. Christians also held commemorations.

==== Other ====
On social media, some Iraqis expressed anger at the ADE 651 fake bomb detector, which Abadi announced would be withdrawn from checkpoints. Reuters has also reported that Iraqis are calling for increased crackdowns on so-called sleeper cells. Thousand of Iraqis gathered at the site of the bombing on 6 July to mourn the victims and express solidarity with their families.

=== International ===
Abdul Kareem Khalaf, an advisor to the European Centre for Counter-terrorism and Intelligence Studies think tank, recommended that Abadi "have a meeting with the heads of national security, intelligence, the interior ministry and all sides responsible for security and ask them just one question: How can we infiltrate these groups?"

On 6 July, New Zealand's Sky Tower in Auckland was lit up in the red, white, and black colors of the Iraqi flag to honour the victims of the attack. This initiative came at the urging of an Iraqi-New Zealander named Rania Alani who had called on the Sky Tower management to honour the victims of all attacks equally. Alani pointed out that Sky Tower had lit up in the colours of the French and American flags to honour the victims of attacks like the November 2015 Paris attacks and the 2016 Orlando nightclub shooting. In addition, the Auckland Iraqi community held a candlelit vigil at the Mission Bay fountain in a show of solidarity with the Baghdad bombing victims.

== See also ==
- List of Islamist terrorist attacks
- List of terrorist incidents, July–December 2016
- Terrorist incidents in Iraq in 2016
- Muhammad ibn Ali al-Hadi Mausoleum attack
