= 2016 Şemdinli bombing =

Car bombing perpetrated by the Kurdistan Workers Party's armed wing in 2016

- Part of Kurdish–Turkish conflict
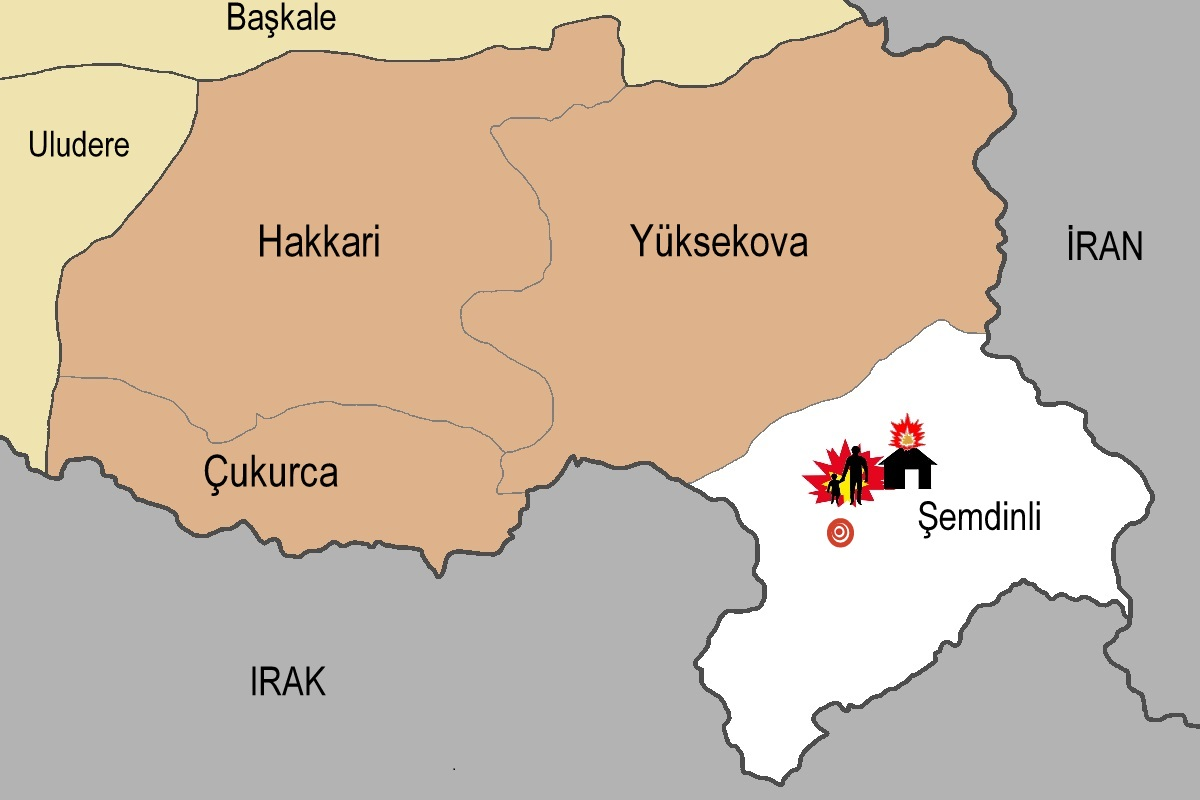
- The shape of the attack
- Location: 37.408323°N 44.540277°E; Şemdinli, Hakkari, Turkey
- Date: 9 October 2016 (UTC +3)
- Attack type: Car Bomb, Suicide bombing
- Deaths: 10 soldiers 5 civilians (1 foreign citizen); 1 assailant (Turkish claim) 32 soldiers (HPG claim)
- Injuries: 27 soldiers and civilians
- Perpetrator: HPG (PKK's armed wing)
- Motive: Kurdish–Turkish conflict

The 2016 Şemdinli bombing was a car bomb attack on Turkish military base carried out by the Kurdish PKK's armed wing HPG in Turkey which occurred on 9 October 2016. According to the Turkish authorities, a car bomb killed at least 18 people including 10 soldiers and 8 civilians. Also, another 27 people were wounded according to initial reports. The PKK's armed wing HPG claimed the attack and claimed to have killed more than 32 soldiers.

One day later, the casualties were identified, all the records of hospitals and clinics in the region were scanned and according to the latest statements; number of casualties is 15 at the moment, not 18, with 5 of those who died being civilians. 1 civilian was an Iranian citizen who was in town for family visiting. Another one of the casualties was a 15 year old Turkish citizen boy from the region. With the terrorist, who blasted himself, the total death total is 16, as of October 10.

The assailant, whose body is yet to be identified in order to determine his exact account and citizenship, was claimed to be a member of the PKK and is thought to have arrived in Turkey from neighboring Iraq soon before the attack. The course of the attack was based on a car bomb scheme and it was a suicide bombing. Turkish authorities claimed that the militant, drove a pick-up truck with 5-tonnes of explosives attached and "without caring about the civilian presence", drove into the checkpoint of the Turkish army base and detonated explosives. As a result, both officers and civilians lost their lives.

According to the a state-run press agency Anadolu Ajansi, following the attack, on the same day, at a meeting of pro-government tribe and clan representatives of southeast Turkey in Van, 181 Kurdish clan representatives from 16 different provinces in Turkey condemned PKK's actions and motives of separatism.

== Reaction ==
=== Reactions from officials ===
Prime Minister Binali Yıldırım condemned the attack and PKK's "separatist ideas which brought only pain to everyone living in the region" and vowed to end any type of terror, Islamist or separatist, for the benefit of every Turkish citizen.

Turkish President Recep Tayyip Erdoğan condemned PKK's inhumane actions and raised his condolences for the soldiers and civilian citizens. He furthermore stressed "the integrity of our country will see PKK unable to do any more violence" and stated "for the benefit our nation, we will take every necessary diplomatic, military and politic measure in and outside our borders".

=== Reactions from Kurdish civil representatives ===
Following the incident, in a meeting of pro-government clans' representatives from southeast region of Turkey took place in Van. Anadolu Ajansi claimed that 181 Kurdish clan representatives from 16 different provinces in the region published a joint statement. In the statement, the clan representatives condemned PKK and the latest attack. Furthermore, in the statement, representatives of those clans showed their support for the integrity and unity of Turkey and state's fight against the PKK, which they asked for the cessation of their operations. Representatives highlighted they support legal politics instead of violence.

According to the pro-government newspaper Anadolu Ajansi, besides PKK, the representatives of pro-government clans, in the biggest-ever meeting of pro-government clan members of the region, expressed their "disappointment and disapproval" of the support HDP, the main Kurdish political party, showed to the PKK's insurgency attempts in the region, stating that "there can never be a scenario in which they will share the same row with the PKK." Representatives of pro-government clans went on to say; "the mission which some had before the elections as a 'Kurdish politician' in Turkey are being mis-used by those politicians and the 6 million votes they received from this country are being abused", adding; "we are disappointed with this approach and also call for the end and correction of it".

The pro-government newspaper Anadolu Ajansi claimed that the meeting was the biggest response from pro-government Kurdish representatives against PKK, and it was compared to the Erzurum Congress and Sivas Congress of the Turkish National Campaign after the First World War and was evaluated as one of the biggest messages and hopes for the better-integrity of Turkey and end of the Kurdish–Turkish conflict.

== See also ==
- List of terrorist incidents in October 2016
