= 2016 Galkayo bombings =

Terrorist incident in Somalia

On 21 August 2016, a double suicide bombing occurred in Galkayo, Mudug, Somalia. It killed 20 people and injured another 30. The first was a truck bombing which targeted local government headquarters in the city. The second was a car bombing which targeted the emergency services responding to the first bombing. Islamist group al-Shabaab claimed responsibility for the double bombing.

Al-Shabaab also carried out mass murders in Galkayo on 26 November 2018 and 21 December 2019.
