= 2016 Atmeh attack =

Suicide bombing

- Part of the Syrian Civil War
- Location: Atmeh, Syria
- Date: 15 August 2016
- Target: Free Syrian Army
- Attack type: Bomb attack
- Weapon: Suicide attack
- Deaths: 50
- Injuries: 50
- Perpetrator: Islamic State of Iraq and the Levant
- Motive: Terror

On 15 August 2016, a suicide bombing that targeted a packed Syrian rebel junction at the Atmeh border crossing, killed 50 Syrian rebels, several civilians, and reports of 2 wounded Turkish soldiers. The attack was claimed by Islamic State, that stated it targeted Syrian rebel fighters from Faylaq al-Sham and Harakat Nour al-Din al-Zenki. Around 32 dead fighters were from the Nour al-Din al-Zenki group.

== Attack ==
A bus transporting rebel fighters was completely destroyed in the targeted blast, causing 40 deaths and 50 injuries. The Free Syrian Army rebel factions were preparing a mobilization from the Turkish border towards the Aleppo Front to either battle the Syrian Army or Islamic State.
