= 2016 Samawa bombing =

Terrorist attack in Samawa, Iraq

- Part of War in Iraq
- Location: Samawa, Iraq
- Date: 1 May 2016
- Target: Shias
- Attack type: Double suicide bombing
- Weapon: Two bombs
- Deaths: 33+ (+2)
- Injuries: 75
- Perpetrator: Islamic State
- Motive: Anti-Shiism

On 1 May 2016, attacks targeted Iraq's deep Shiite south, with the explosion of twin suicide car bombs in the city of Samawa. At least 33 people were killed and 75 wounded.

== Bombing ==
The first blast took place near a local government building and the second one about 65 yards away at a bus station, police sources said. The death toll and wounded number is expected to keep rising. The blasts took place in Samawa, in southern Iraq. The Islamic State claimed responsibility for the attacks in Iraq's deep Shiite south, where incidents are considered rare. The bombers were named as Abu Dayyar al-Qurashi and Abu Zubayr al-Zaidi.

== See also ==
- 2015–16 Iraqi protests
- List of terrorist incidents, January–June 2016
- Terrorist incidents in Iraq in 2016
- Timeline of the Iraq War (2016)
