= Real Madrid fan club massacres =

2016 attack in a café in Balad, Iraq

Real Madrid Fan Club massacres
- Part of the War in Iraq
- Real Madrid fan club massacres (Iraq)
- Location: Balad, Iraq
- Date: 13–29 May 2016
- Target: Shia football fans
- Attack type: Shooting, suicide bombing
- Weapons: AK-47s, bombs
- Deaths: Total: 28+ (+1 bomber): 13 May: 16+; 29 May: 12+ (+1 bomber)
- Injuries: Total: 45+: 13 May: 30+; 29 May: 15+
- Perpetrator: Islamic State
- Motive: Anti-Shiism

On 13 May 2016, a group of militants armed with AK-47s attacked a cafe in Balad, Iraq, frequented by supporters of the Spanish football club Real Madrid. The Islamic State (IS) claimed responsibility for the attack. At least 16 people were killed and at least 30 were wounded.

On 29 May 2016, IS gunmen and a suicide bomber attacked another Real Madrid fan club in the same area, killing at least 12 people and injuring around 15. They were attacked while watching the 2016 UEFA Champions League Final.

== Events ==
During the first attack on 13 May, around 50 fans of Real Madrid were gathered in a café in Balad, to discuss their arrangements for their favorite team's upcoming football match, when six armed men stormed into the café and started to shoot at the young men. Reports claim that grenades were also used to attack those gathered to watch the match. Several attackers reportedly fled the cafe and then detonated themselves, one was captured but then burned to death.

At least 14 people were killed outright and two more died of their wounds later on. More than 30 people were injured.

== Responsibility ==
Survivors of the attack blamed the attack on May 13 on IS and its opposition to football.

In its claim of responsibility, IS said the attack had targeted Shia militiamen, making no mention of any connection to Real Madrid. Some believe that the claim stems from the extremist groups ideology against football, as they believe it is a product of western society.

== Reaction ==
Javier Tebas Medrano the President of Spain's La Liga responded to the attack with the statement "Terrorism has attacked football. We are with the victims and their families." The Real Madrid football club itself expressed "great sadness" and offered its "regards and condolences" to the families and friends of the victims. Real Madrid players wore black armbands for their away game against Deportivo de La Coruña, on 14 May 2016, as a mark of respect. The team also honoured the victims by observing a moment of silence before their match.

On 28 May 2016, family and friends of victims gathered at the cafe to watch the game, surrounded by armed police, frisking those who attempted to enter the cafe.

After the second attack, Florentino Pérez, the club president, dedicated Real Madrid's win to the fans that were killed, and other Iraqi club fans, including those killed by IS. Alaa al-Hashemi, the Iraqi ambassador to Spain, thanked the club and invited the president to visit Iraq.

== See also ==
- 11 May 2016 Baghdad bombings
- List of terrorist incidents, January–June 2016
- Terrorist incidents in Iraq in 2016
- Borussia Dortmund team bus bombing
