= 9 September 2016 Baghdad bombings =

Terrorist attack in Baghdad, Iraq

- Part of the War in Iraq (2013–2017)
- Location: al-Nakheel Mall, Rasafa, Baghdad, Iraq
- Date: 9 September 2016 (UTC+03)
- Target: Iraqi Shias
- Attack type: Car bombing, suicide bombing
- Deaths: 40+
- Injuries: 60+
- Perpetrator: Islamic State
- Motive: Anti-Shiism

The 9 September 2016 Baghdad bombings occurred just before midnight on Friday, 9 September 2016. Twin suicide bombings occurred at the al-Nakheel Mall in Palestine Street, in eastern Baghdad. A car rigged with explosives detonated at the car park of the mall and an assailant blew up his car in a busy street outside shortly afterwards. At least 40 people were killed and 60 wounded. The bombings were later claimed by Islamic State. The Amaq News Agency, which supports Islamic State, said that the bombers targeted "a gathering of Shi'ites".

== See also ==
- American-led intervention in Iraq (2014–present)
- List of terrorist incidents in September 2016
- List of terrorist incidents linked to ISIL
- List of mass car bombings
- Military intervention against ISIL
- Number of terrorist incidents by country
- Timeline of ISIL-related events (2016)
- List of Islamist terrorist attacks
- War on terror
