= 2016 Hurghada attack =

Hurghada, Egypt terror attack in 2016

- Part of Sinai insurgency
- Location of Red Sea Governorate in Egypt.
- Location: 27°15′28″N 33°48′42″E; Hurghada, Red Sea Governorate, Egypt
- Date: 8 January 2016 (UTC+02:00)
- Attack type: Stabbing
- Deaths: 1 (a perpetrator)
- Injuries: 3 (including one perpetrator)
- Perpetrator: Islamic State – Sinai Province
- No. of participants: 2

On 8 January 2016, two suspected Islamic State members, armed with a melee weapon and a signal flare, allegedly arrived by sea and stormed the Bella Vista Hotel in the Red Sea city of Hurghada, Egypt, stabbing two foreign tourists from Austria and one from Sweden. One of the attackers, 21-year-old student Mohammed Hassan Mohammed Mahfouz, was killed by police as he tried to take a woman hostage. The other attacker was injured. The Islamic State of Iraq and the Levant claimed responsibility.

== Attack ==
An Egyptian court found that the attack was incited by a Syria-based operative of the Islamic State who was in contact with the perpetrators.

According to The Independent, both attackers carried knives and pellet guns. According to Al Jazeera, they carried "a gun, a knife and a suicide belt."

All roads into and out of Hurghada were closed as Egyptian security searched for additional attackers. According to BBC security analyst Frank Gardner, the ISIS goal in inciting such attacks is to undermine crucial support tourism provides to the Egyptian economy.

== Assailants ==
There were two attackers, Mohamad Hassan Mohamed Mahfouz and Mohamed Magdy Abul Kheir. Mahfouz was shot dead at the scene; Kheir was wounded. Kheir was charged with possessing ammunition and firearms, joining an illegal group, and attempted murder. He was given a life sentence.

An operative of the Islamic State, Ahmad Abdel Salam Mansour, an Egyptian national operating out of Syrian, was tried in absentia by an Egyptian court on charges of having incited the two attackers. He was sentenced in absentia to life in prison.

== Response ==
Hisham Zaazou, Egypt's Minister of Tourism, responded by announcing new security measures to protect tourists.

The attack was one of 78 described by Donald Trump as underreported terrorist attacks.

== Impact ==
Egypt, which is a country that depends on tourism saw tourism nosedive during the revolution. Once the country's government began to stabilize and tourism began picking up, terrorists began targeting tourism sites. Due to this and other attacks, 2016 was a "tough year" for the tourism industry in Egypt.

== See also ==
- 2017 Hurghada attack
- Terrorism in Egypt
- List of terrorist incidents, January–June 2016
- Timeline of the Sinai insurgency
