= Islamic Movement for the Liberation of Raja =

Islamic Movement for the Liberation of Raja or the Raja Liberation Front (IMLR; Arabic: جبهة تحرير راجا, romanized: Jabhat taḥrīr R̄ājā) is a South Sudanese rebel group operating in Western Bahr el Ghazal, created and led by Ali Tamim Fartak.

== History ==
IMLR first surfaced on 15 June 2016 when the group attacked and briefly captured the town of Raga in Lol State, killing dozens of government soldiers including 7 bodyguards of the Lol State governor Rezik Zechariah Hassan. Raga was recaptured on 19 June, by South Sudanese government forces supported by the Justice and Equality Movement (JEM). On 28 June, the IMLR clashed with government forces in Wau, the capital of Wau State, killing 39 civilians and 4 police officers.

South Sudan's information minister Michael Makuei Lueth stated that the rebels came from Sudan and had the crossed the border to attack Raga and Wau. Lueth told reporters that Fartak "was trying to carve out an Islamist state" and that his group included members of the notorious Lord's Resistance Army and the Janjaweed. Lueth also blamed the Sudanese government for supporting the rebels. The Sudanese embassy in Juba denied the accusations, stating that "Sudan has no connection, near or far, to those armed confrontations that took place in the two cities". The SPLM-IO shadow governor for Wau, Peter Tingo disputed the governments claims about a new rebel group. Tingo stated that the attacks in Raja and Wau were conducted by a SPLM-IO-linked tribal militia.
