= February 2016 Sadr City bombings =

2016 bombings in Sadr City, Baghdad

Sadr City bombings
- Part of War in Iraq (2013–2017)
- Location: Baghdad, Iraq
- Date: 28 February 2016 (UTC+3)
- Attack type: Suicide motorcycle bombings
- Deaths: 70
- Injuries: 60-100
- Perpetrator: Islamic State

On 28 February 2016, at least 70 people were killed and 60 wounded in Sadr City, a southern suburb of Baghdad, as two bombs went off at a crowded market. The explosions ripped through a market selling mobile phones in the mainly Shiite Muslim district. The assailants were suicide bombers riding motorcycles through the crowd.

== See also ==
- List of terrorist incidents, January–June 2016
- Terrorist incidents in Iraq in 2016
