= August 2013 Quetta bombing =

Terror attack at a funeral in Pakistan

Quetta bomb attack
- Location: Quetta, Pakistan
- Date: 8 August 2013
- Target: Fayaz Sumbal
- Attack type: Bomb blast
- Deaths: 37
- Injuries: over 50
- Perpetrators: unknown, possibly the Taliban

On 8 August 2013, a suicide attacker exploded a bomb at a funeral being held for a police officer in Quetta, Pakistan, and killed as many as thirty-seven people and injured over fifty people. No group has taken responsibility for the bombing, but it is believed that the Taliban were behind the bombing. A senior police officer, Fayyaz Sumbal, noticed the suicide bomber before he blew himself up. As Fayyaz began searching the suicide bomber's body, the bomber blew himself up. The bomber was wearing a jacket that had ball bearings and shrapnel inside.

== See also ==
- 8 August 2016 Quetta bombing
- 9 August 2013 Quetta shooting
- Terrorist incidents in Pakistan in 2013
- Quetta attacks
