= Persecution of Christians by the Islamic State =

Persecution and genocide of Christians by the Islamic State
- Part of the Syrian civil war, the War in Iraq (2013–2017), the Sinai insurgency, the Libyan civil war (2014–2020), the Boko Haram insurgency, the Kivu conflict, the Insurgency in Cabo Delgado, and the Moro Conflict
- Location: Territory of the Islamic State Iraq; Egypt; Syria; Libya; Nigeria; Democratic Republic of the Congo; Mozambique; Philippines
- Date: Ongoing
- Target: Christians (mostly Assyrians, Arab Christians, Armenians, Copts, Citadel Christians, and other groups)
- Attack type: Genocidal massacre, religious persecution, ethnic cleansing, human trafficking and forced conversions to Sunni Islam.
- Perpetrator: Islamic State
- Defenders: Christian militias in Iraq and Syria; Iraqi Armed Forces; CJTF–OIR; Syrian Armed Forces; Egyptian Armed Forces; Libyan National Army; Armed Forces of the Philippines
- Motive: Islamic extremism; Anti-Christian sentiment

The persecution of Christians by the Islamic State involves the systematic mass murder of Christian minorities, within the regions of Iraq, Syria, Egypt, Libya, Democratic Republic of the Congo, Mozambique and Nigeria controlled by the Islamic extremist group Islamic State. Persecution of Christian minorities climaxed following the Syrian civil war and later by its spillover but has since intensified further. Christians have been subjected to massacres, forced conversions, rape, sexual slavery, and the systematic destruction of their historical sites, churches and other places of worship.

According to US diplomat Alberto M. Fernandez, "While the majority of the victims of the conflict which is raging in Syria and Iraq have been Muslims, Christians have borne a heavy burden given their small numbers."

The depopulation of Christians from the Middle East by the Islamic State as well as other organisations and governments has been formally recognised as an ongoing genocide by the United States, European Union, and United Kingdom. Christians remain the most persecuted religious group in the Middle East, and Christians in Iraq are “close to extinction”. According to estimates by the US State Department, the number of Christians in Iraq has fallen from 1.2 million 2011 to 120,000 in 2024, and the number in Syria from 1.5 million to 300,000, falls driven by persecution by terrorist groups and repression by authoritarian regimes.

== Timeline ==
The mass flight and expulsion of ethnic Assyrians from Iraq and Syria is a process which was initiated during the start of the 2003 invasion of Iraq by the US and the Multi-National Force and later it was initiated during the start of the Syrian civil war and the spillover. Leaders of Iraq's Assyrian community estimate that over two-thirds of the Iraqi Assyrian population may have fled the country or been internally displaced during the U.S.-led invasion which lasted from 2003 until 2011. Reports suggest that whole neighborhoods of Assyrians have cleared out in the cities of Baghdad and Basra, and that Sunni insurgent groups and militias have threatened Assyrian Christians. Following the campaign of the Islamic State in northern Iraq in August 2014, one quarter of the remaining Assyrians fled the jihadists, finding refuge in neighboring countries.

=== Northern Iraq (2014) ===
After the fall of Mosul, IS demanded that Assyrian Christians living in the city convert to Islam, pay jizyah, or face execution, by July 19, 2014. IS leader Abu Bakr al-Baghdadi further noted that Christians who do not agree to follow those terms must "leave the borders of the Islamic Caliphate" within a specified deadline. This resulted in a complete Assyrian Christian exodus from Mosul, marking the end of 1,800 years of continuous Christian presence. A church mass was not held in Mosul for the first time in nearly 2 millennia.

In October 2014, a release put out by the Assyrian International News Agency stated that 200,000 Assyrians had been driven from their homes by the violence and become displaced.

IS has already set similar rules for Christians living in other cities and towns, including its de facto capital Raqqa.

IS had also been seen marking Christian homes with the letter nūn for Nassarah ("Cultural Christian"). Several religious buildings were seized and subsequently demolished, most notably Mar Behnam Monastery.

By August 7, IS captured the primarily Assyrian towns of Qaraqosh, Tel Keppe, Bartella, and Karamlish, prompting the residents to flee. More than 100,000 Iraqi Christians were forced to flee their homes and leave all their property behind after IS invaded Qaraqosh and surrounding towns in the Nineveh Plains Province of Iraq.

=== Libya (2015) ===
On February 12, 2015, the IS released a report in their online magazine Dabiq showing photos of 21 Egyptian Copts migrant workers that they had kidnapped in the city of Sirte, Libya, and whom they threatened to kill to "avenge the [alleged] kidnapping of Muslim women by the Egyptian Coptic Church". The men, who came from different villages in Egypt, 13 of them from Al-Our, Minya Governorate, were kidnapped in Sirte in two separate attacks on December 27, 2014, and in January 2015.

=== Syria (2015) ===
In February 2015, in response to a major Kurdish offensive in the Al-Hasakah Governorate, IS abducted 150 Assyrians from villages near Tell Tamer in northeastern Syria, after launching a large offensive in the region.

According to US diplomat Alberto M. Fernandez, of the 232 of the Assyrians kidnapped in the IS attack on the Assyrian Christian farming villages on the banks of the Khabur River in Northeast Syria, 51 were children and 84 were women. "Most of them remain in captivity, with one account claiming that ISIS is demanding $22 million (or roughly $100,000 per person) for their release."

On 8 October 2015, IS released a video showing three of the Assyrian men kidnapped in Khabur being murdered. It was reported that 202 of the 253 kidnapped Assyrians were still in captivity, each one with a demanded ransom of $100,000.

=== Egypt (2018) ===
On 2 November 2018, Islamic State gunmen killed at least seven Coptic Christian pilgrims in Egypt on Friday and wounded at least 16 in an attack. In April 2021, Islamic State gunmen executed a Christian businessman who was kidnapped in Egypt's Sinai.

=== Philippines ===
On the Island of Mindanao, Groups such as Abu Sayyaf and the Maute Group have pledged allegiance to the self-proclaimed Islamic State (ISIS) to gain financial help and recruit foreign fighters. Islamic extremists routinely threaten Christians and have driven many out of Muslim-majority areas. Many pastors and other believers have been killed

==== Jolo Cathedral bombings ====
In the morning of January 27, 2019, two bombs exploded at the Roman Catholic Cathedral of Our Lady of Mount Carmel in Jolo, Sulu, Philippines. Twenty people were killed and 102 others injured, perpetrated by Abu Sayyaf and Jamaah Ansharut Daulah targeting Christians

== Reactions ==
On 2 and 3 August 2014, thousands of Assyrians of the diaspora protested the persecution of their fellow Assyrians within Iraq and Syria, demanding a United Nations-led creation of a safe haven for minorities in the Nineveh Plains.

In October 2014, Kurdish-Danish human rights activist Widad Akrawi dedicated her 2014 International Pfeffer Peace Award "to all victims of persecution, particularly the Yazidis, the Christians, and all residents of the Kobanê region."

The same month, David Greene, a radio journalist at NPR, stated that around 1,000 Christians had been killed "in areas where Islamic State fighters are targeting religious minorities", without specifying a source.

== Recognition as genocide ==
Chaldean Catholic priest Douglas Al-Bazi, who was tortured by the Islamic State, has urged the US to recognise the killings as genocide.

On February 3, 2016, European Parliament unanimously voted to recognize the persecution of religious minorities, including Christians, by the Islamic State as genocide. Lars Adaktusson, a Swedish member of the European Parliament, said of the vote: "It gives the victims of the atrocities a chance to get their human dignity restored. It's also a historical confirmation that the European Parliament recognized what is going on and that they are suffering from the most despicable crime in the world, namely genocide."

The United States House of Representatives followed suit on March 15, 2016, declaring that these atrocities against minorities were genocide. Already in December 2015, at a town hall event, the 67th United States Secretary of State, Hillary Clinton, called the systematic persecution a genocide.

On April 20, 2016, the British Parliament unanimously voted to denounce the actions against minorities as genocide.

== See also ==
- Armenian genocide
- Boxer Rebellion
  - §Massacre of Chinese Christians and missionaries
- Assyrian genocide
- Christianity and Islam
- Christianity in the Middle East
- Collaboration with the Islamic State
- Genocide of Yazidis by the Islamic State
- Index of articles related to the Yezidis
- Iraqi Turkmen genocide
- Great Famine of Mount Lebanon
- Greek genocide
- Human rights in Islamic State-controlled territory
- Hindu terrorism
  - Hindutva
  - Violence against Christians in India
- Late Ottoman genocides
- Persecution of Shias by the Islamic State
- Syrian Civil War spillover in Iraq
- Persecution of Copts
