= 2016 Baghdad–Miqdadiyah attacks =

Islamic State bombings in Iraq

Baghdad–Miqdadiyah attacks
- Part of Iraqi Civil War (2014–2017)
- Location: Baghdad and Miqdadiyah, Iraq
- Date: 11 January 2016
- Target: Shia civilians in Al-Jawhara shopping mall
- Weapons: Car bombs, mass murder, suicide bombing
- Deaths: 132 (including the 6 perpetrators)
- Perpetrator: Islamic State

On 11 January 2016, a series of terrorist attacks occurred in Baghdad and Miqdadiyah, Iraq. The attack resulted in 132 people being killed, including the six attackers.

== Events ==
At least 12 people were killed in an attack on the Al-Jawhara shopping mall in Baghdad after a car bomb exploded outside. Hostages were taken by six gunmen in the incident. At least 19 people were injured.

A double blast at a cafe north of the Iraqi capital claimed another 20 lives in the late afternoon in the town of Muqdadiyah northeast of Baghdad. An IS suicide bomber detonated an explosives-rigged vehicle after people gathered at the scene. The Islamic State (IS) claimed the attack and named the suicide bomber as Abu Abdallah, an Iraqi. The security officers said that Shiites set alight several Sunni homes and a mosque following the attack.

Two huge bomb blasts, one at a tea shop and the other at a mosque, killed at least 100 people in the township of Sharaban in Iraq's northern Diyala province. The first blast went off at a tea shop in the neighborhood of Asri and the second one targeted Nazanda Khatun Mosque while the prayers were going on. The second blast went off after security forces and people arrived to the scene. IS claimed responsibility for the explosions shortly after it took place.

== Reaction ==
- Turkey: Foreign Ministry statemented condemning terrorist attacks, expressed condolences for deaths and "the friendly and brotherly people of Iraq". And said they will be resolutely remaining to support Iraq's fight against terrorism.
