= 2016 Ramadi bombing =

Bombing in Ramadi, Iraq

- Part of the Iraqi Civil War (2014–2017)
- Location: Ramadi, Iraq
- Date: 27 January 2016
- Attack type: Car bombings
- Deaths: 55
- Injuries: Unknown
- Perpetrator: Islamic State

On 27 January 2016, up to a dozen car bombs were set off in the city of Ramadi, attacking the 10th Iraqi army division. The attack killed 55 Iraqi soldiers and pro-government tribal fighters, wounding an unknown number as well. The Islamic State claimed responsibility for the attack.

== See also ==
- List of terrorist incidents, January–June 2016
