= 2016 Taji gas plant attack =

Natural gas plant bombing in Taji, Iraq

Taji gas plant attack
- Part of the Iraqi Civil War (2014–2017)
- Location: Taji, Iraq
- Date: 15 May 2016
- Attack type: Car bombing, suicide bombing, shooting
- Deaths: 14+ (9 attackers also killed, maybe more)
- Injuries: 47+
- Perpetrator: Islamic State

On 15 May 2016, a team of IS bombers assaulted a natural-gas plant north of Baghdad, Iraq, killing at least 14 people, eight suicide bombers, injuring 27 troops and burning 20 workers.

== Attack ==
A government-run plant was attacked, with attacks starting at dawn, with a suicide car bomber hitting the facility's main gate in the town of Taji, about 20km north of Baghdad. After eight suicide bombings, clashes broke out with security forces, leaving 27 soldiers wounded. Around 20 workers of the plant were seriously burned. IS suspected, that the plant was being used by the Iraqi army. Three of the facility's gas storages were set alight, before security forces were able to bring the situation under control. Firefighters managed to control and extinguish a fire, caused by the explosions, and technicians examined the damage. The power station provided, with the help of others, that had halted operations, 153 megawatts to the already overstretched national grid before the attack. Eight policemen were among the casualties of the attack.
