= May 2016 Jableh and Tartus bombings =

ISIL terrorist incident in Syria

23 May 2016 Jableh and Tartus bombings
- Part of the Syrian Civil War
- Location: Jableh and Tartus, Latakia Governorate, Syria
- Date: 23 May 2016
- Target: Civilians
- Attack type: Multiple bombings
- Weapons: Suicide bombers and car bombs
- Deaths: 184+ (plus five attackers)
- Injuries: 200
- Perpetrator: ISIS
- Motive: Terrorism

On 23 May 2016, eight bombings were carried out by the Islamic State of Iraq and the Levant in Jableh and Tartus, coastline cities in Syria. 184 people were killed and at least 200 people injured. One of the major explosions occurred at the Jableh National Hospital, in the city of Jableh, where likely 43 people were killed. Doctors and nurses were among the dead. The bombings in Tartus targeted a bus station (bus stations were also targeted in Jableh). Many of the blasts were only a few seconds apart. The attacks took place in relatively violence-free areas of Syria. Many of the facilities, which were hit, are no longer operational. The cities were government-controlled territory, that hosted Russian military bases. Russia has a naval base in Tartus and an air base near Jableh.

The Syrian government had accused Qatar, Saudi Arabia and Turkey of being behind the wave of bombings in these cities.

== See also ==
- List of terrorist incidents, January–June 2016
- Timeline of the Syrian Civil War
