= Persecution of Shias by the Islamic State =

Overview of the systematic persecution of Shia Muslims by the Islamic State

Persecution of Shias by (IS)
- Location: Afghanistan; Iraq; Kuwait; Lebanon; Oman; Pakistan; Saudi Arabia; Syria; Yemen
- Date: June 2014 – present
- Target: Shia Muslims
- Attack type: Religious persecution, mass murder, prison shootings, mass rape, terrorism, ethnic cleansing, genocidal massacre
- Perpetrator: Islamic State
- Defenders: Iraq; Iran; Ba'athist Syria; Hezbollah; Houthis; Pakistan
- Motive: Anti-Shia sentiment Salafi jihadist extremism

Shia Muslims have been persecuted by the Islamic State (IS), an Islamist extremist terrorist group, since 2014. Persecutions have taken place in Iraq, Syria, and other parts of the world.

Despite being the religious majority in Iraq, Shia Muslims have been killed and otherwise persecuted by IS, which is Sunni. On 12 June 2014, the Islamic State killed 1,700 unarmed Shia Iraqi Army cadet recruits in the Camp Speicher massacre. IS has also targeted Shia prisoners. According to witnesses, after the militant group took the city of Mosul, they divided the Sunni prisoners from the Shia prisoners. Up to 670 Shia prisoners were then taken to another location and executed. Kurdish officials in Erbil reported on the incident of Sunni and Shia prisoners being separated and Shia prisoners being killed after the Mosul prison fell to IS.

IS also targeted Christians and Yazidis in northern Iraq on a "historic scale", putting entire communities "at risk of being wiped off the map of Iraq". In a special report released on 2 September 2014, Amnesty International described how IS had "systematically targeted non-Sunni Muslim communities, killing or abducting hundreds, possibly thousands, of individuals and forcing more than tens of thousands of Shias, Sunnis, along with other minorities to flee the areas it has captured since 10 June 2014". The most targeted Shia groups in Nineveh Governorate were Shia Turkmens and Shabaks.

== Fall of Mosul ==
In summer 2014, Shia properties in Mosul and other IS-held areas were painted with the letter ⟨ر⟩ (rā) for Rafidah, a derogatory term for Shias used by Sunni Muslims. Houses and shops owned by Shias were confiscated by IS and given to local IS supporters or IS foreign fighters. Thousands of Shia Shabaks and Turkmen fled the cities of Mosul, Tal Afar, and the rest of Nineveh Governorate to safer Shia-majority areas further south.

== Attacks against Shias in Iraq ==
Thousands of Shias from villages in Salahudin and Kirkuk governorates fled to neighbouring villages in Kirkuk after three Shia villages were attacked by IS and at least 40 civilians including children were killed near the town of Bashir.

== Destruction of Shia shrines and places of worship ==
The Islamic State views Shia Muslims as polytheists and heretics. Therefore, it started a campaign to destroy all Shia shrines, mosques and places of worship in Nineveh and all IS-held areas. Reports stated that at least 10 Shia shrines and hussiniyas including historical ones in Mosul and Tal Afar were demolished or blown up by IS during this campaign. On March 26, 2014, IS blew up the Shia shrine of the companion of Muhammad, Uwais al-Qarni. In July 2016, IS attacked a Shia shrine during the Muhammad ibn Ali al-Hadi Mausoleum attack, killing anywhere from 56 to at least 100 people.

== Genocide claims ==
On 17 March 2016, United States Secretary of State John Kerry declared that the violence initiated by IS against Shia Muslims and others in Iraq and Syria amounted to genocide. He said:

"In my judgment, Daesh is responsible for genocide against groups in areas under its control including Yazidis, Christians and Shia Muslims" – John Kerry

Kerry's statement came the same week the US House voted 383–0 in favor of classifying the atrocities committed by the Islamic State as a genocide against certain ethnic and religious minorities in its territories.

== List of Islamic State attacks on Shias ==
=== Afghanistan ===
The Islamic State – Khorasan Province has committed bombing attacks against Hazara Shia civilians in Afghanistan.

- On February 24, 2015, 30 Shia men were kidnapped between Kabul and Kandahar.
- On July 24, 2016, a suicide bombing occurred killing 80 Shias and 231 injured in Kabul during a protest.
- On October 11, 2016, in Kart-e Sakhi, Kabul, 14 Shias were killed by a suicide bombing.
- On November 21, 2016, a suicide bombing occurred killing 32 and injuring over 80 Shias at the Shia Baqir-ul Ulum Mosque, Kabul.
- On August 1, 2017, in Jadwadia, Herat, Afghanistan a bombing occurred killing 33 deaths and leaving 66 people injured.
- On August 25, 2017, in Imam Zaman Shia Mosque, Dasht-e Barchi, Kabul 35 were killed and 65 were injured by a suicide bombing.
- On October 20, 2017, in Imam Zaman Shia Mosque, Khair Khana, Kabul 69 were killed and 77 were injured by a suicide bombing.
- On December 28, 2017, in Shia Tabayan cultural center, Kabul 42 were killed and 69 were injured by a suicide bombing.
- On March 21, 2018, in Kart-e Sakhi, Kabul, 33 were killed and 65 were injured by a suicide bombing.
- On August 18, 2019, a bombing happened at a shia wedding killing 63 and 180 wounded.
- On March 6, 2020, an IS gunmen killed 32 and wounded 81 in the Dasht-e-Barchi area during a ceremoney.
- On May 12, 2020, Shia Hazara's were attacked by bombing Dasht-e-Barchi hospital killing 24 people and injuring an unknown number of people.
- On October 25, 2020, a bombing occurred in the Shia Dasht-E-Brachi district killing 30 people and wounding over 70.
- On May 8, 2021, an attack happened at the Dasht-e-Barachi district, near the Shia Sayeed-ul-Shuhada Girls School killing 50 people have wounding more than 100.
- On October 8, 2021, Shia Muslims were attacked at Sayed Abad Mosque, Kunduz leading to 72 dead and 140 injured.
- On October 15, 2021, a bombing occurred in the Bibi Fatima Mosque, Kandahar killing 63 Shias and 83 injured.
- On November 13, 2021, a bombing occurred in a Shia dominated suburb leading 1 death and 4 injured.
- On December 10, 2021, a bombing occurred in the Dasht-e-Barchi district in Kabul leading to two Shias dead and four injured.
- On April 21, 2022, four bombings occurred all over Afghanistan, one of the bombings was claimed by IS. It was the bombing north of Mazar-e-Sharif, at a Shia mosque. 33 have died and 43 have been wounded.
- On April 28, 2022, A bombing happened near the Shia shrine, Mazar-i-Sharif killing nine people and wounding 13.
- On September 30, 2022, A suicide bombing in an educational facility, in "a Shiite area" of the Afghan capital of Kabul, detonating in front of hundreds of teenaged boys and girls killing 53 students, 110 injured.
- On 13 October 2023, a suicide bombing happened in Imam Zaman Mosque, Pul-i-Khumri killing over seven people and wounding 17.

=== Iran ===
- On October 26, 2022, in the city of Shiraz at the Shah Cheragh Shrine, 15 Shia pilgrims were killed (two children within the fifteen killed). IS claimed responsibility.

=== Iraq ===
- On June 12, 2014, in Tikrit, IS forces targeted Shia and non-Muslims for killings. The death toll led to 1,095 to 1,700 deaths. This event has been labeled as the Camp Speicher massacre and is considered the second deadliest act of terror. The number of deaths is only exceeded by the death toll of 9/11.
- On June 16, 2014, near the city of Kirkuk, 40 Shia Turkmen were killed by IS.
- On August 13, 2015, a large bombing occurred in a food market in Sadr City in a Shia neighborhood; this bombing led to 76 people being killed and 212 wounded.
- On May 1, 2016, two suicide car bombs in the city of Samawa in a heavily Shia populated area went off, killing 33 Shias and wounding 75.
- On May 2, 2016, IS conducted a bombing in Baghdad, killing 18 Shia pilgrims.
- On July 3, 2016, IS conducted a car bombing on a Shia neighborhood near the end of Ramadan, wounding over 300; the death toll has been confirmed to be 281.
- On July 7, 2016, the Shia shrine of Muhammad ibn Ali al-Hadi was attacked by a bombing, killing 292.
- On July 24, 2016, IS conducted a suicide bombing in Kadhimiya, killing 14 Shias and wounding 31 people.
- On July 20, 2021, IS executed a bombing in a Shia neighborhood on the east side of Baghdad; the bombing resulted in 30 people dead and wounding 50.
- On October 27, 2021, in Al-Rashad, Diyala an IS gunman shot nine men in a majority Shia-populated village, leading to sectarian conflict in the area.

=== Kuwait ===
- On 26 June 2015, IS conducted a bombing on the al-Imam as-Sadiq Mosque during Friday prayer, killing over 25 worshippers and wounding 179.

=== Lebanon ===
- On June 24, 2014, a bombing occurred in a Shia suburb, wounding 12 people.
- On November 12, 2015, A car bombing happened outside of a shia mosque in Beirut, killing over 37 and wounding 181.
- In February 2022, An IS attack on multiple different Shia populated attacks was prevented by the ISF.

=== Oman ===
- On July 15, 2024, on the day of Ashura an attack happened at the Muscat Mosque killing six shias, and injuring 30 to 50 others.

=== Pakistan ===
Islamic State has started to conduct operations in Pakistan.

- On May 13, 2015, a group of IS-linked gunmen attacked a bus, killing 46 Shia Muslims.
- On January 3, 2021, an IS fighter shot down 11 Shia coal miners.
- On March 4, 2022, a bombing occurred in a Shia mosque in Peshawar during Friday prayer, killing 61 Shias and injuring 196.

=== Saudi Arabia ===
- On May 22, 2015, IS conducted a suicide bombing at the Shia Imam Ali mosque in the village of al-Qadeeh during Friday prayer, killing 21 and injuring 80.

=== Syria ===
- In February 2015, a bombing occurred near the shrine at a checkpoint, two suicide bombings killed four people and wounded 13.
- On January 31, 2016, a car bomb and two suicide bombers attacked a district in Damascus near a Shia holy site 60 people died (including 25 Shia fighters) and wounded around 110 people. IS claimed the attack later on.
- On February 21, 2016, a number of bombings occurred in front of the Syeda Zainab Shrine, leading to 198 people dying and 178 wounded, including children.

=== Yemen ===
- On March 20, 2015, multiple Shia mosques were bombed in multiple locations in Sanaa; the casualties were 142 dead and 351 wounded.

== See also ==
- Yazidi genocide
- Iraqi Turkmen genocide
- Persecution of Christians by the Islamic State
- Camp Speicher massacre
- Badush prison massacre
- 2016 Karrada bombing
- Collaboration with the Islamic State
