= 11 May 2016 Baghdad bombings =

Islamist terror attacks in Iraq

May 2016 Baghdad bombings
- Part of the Iraqi Civil War (2014–2017) and Persecution of Shias by the Islamic State
- Location: Baghdad, Iraq
- Date: 11–17 May 2016
- Target: Shiites
- Attack type: Truck bombing, suicide bombing
- Deaths: 103–110+ (11 May); 101+ (17 May); Total: 204–211+ killed
- Injuries: 165+ (11 May); 194+ (17 May); Total: 359+ injured
- Perpetrator: Islamic State
- Motive: Anti-Shiism

In May 2016, the Islamic State conducted a series of bombing attacks in and around Shia neighbourhoods in Baghdad, the capital of Iraq, killing and wounding hundreds. According to IS, attacks were aimed at Shia fighters.

== Background ==
Iraqi Shia militias were fighting alongside the Iraqi army against the Islamic State (IS). The area of Sadr City saw repeated attacks targeting its Shia population. In February 2016, a pair of IS bombings in Sadr City killed 52 people. The market bombed on 11 May is one of the main four outdoor shopping venues in Sadr City.

== 11 May attacks ==
On 11 May 2016, a truck bombing, exploded in a crowded outdoor market in the eastern part of Sadr City, killing mostly women and children. Later in the day, a suicide attack occurred in the Shiite Kadhimiya neighborhood, killing 18 and wounding 43. In the Jamea district in western Baghdad, another car bomb went off in the afternoon, killing at least 13 people. At least seven people were killed and twenty others were wounded in the car bomb explosion that took place in al-Rabie’ street in western Baghdad.

According to an eyewitness, the bomb in Sadr City was placed in a pickup truck loaded with fruit and vegetables. The truck had parked and then its driver quickly disappeared among the crowd, according to an eyewitness who also noted that the explosion jolted the ground. The responsibility for the attack was claimed by IS, which released a related statement on social media saying it intended to target Shiite fighters. Iraqi officials denied IS's claim that the attack was carried out by a suicide bomber.

There were also many attacks outside of Baghdad of the same day, some attributed to IS. Five mortar shells fell near residential houses in the vicinity near Baqubah, resulting in the death of two civilians and wounding three others. An explosive device that was emplaced on the roadside near Baqubah went off while a taxi was passing in the area, resulting in the injury of two persons that were inside it. Five young civilians volunteered to shoot five Iraqi soldiers, accused of apostasy, in their heads for IS.

== 17 May attacks ==
A suicide bombing in the all-Shia northern district of Sha'ab killed 41 people and wounded more than 70. A car bomb in the all-Shia neighborhood Sadr City left at least 30 dead and 57 wounded. Another car bomb in the majority-Shia suburb al-Rashid, south of the capital, killed six and wounded 21. A parked car bomb struck a market in the neighborhood of Dora, in southern Baghdad, killing eight people and wounding 22 others. A suicide bomber targeted a restaurant in the Habibiya neighborhood, killing nine and wounding 18. A bomb blast killed one person and wounded another in al-Rashid, south of Baghdad. A bomb exploded near a popular market in the all-Shia neighborhood al-Amin in eastern Baghdad, killing two people and wounding seven others.
