= Polio in Pakistan =

Occurrence of poliomyelitis in Pakistan

Pakistan is one of the two remaining countries in the world where poliomyelitis (polio) is still categorized as an endemic viral infection, the other one being Afghanistan. While it has yet to fully eradicate polio, there has been a major downwards trend in the number of reported cases per year; the total count of wild poliovirus cases in Pakistan in 2019 was down to 147, compared to 84 in 2020, 1 in 2021, 20 in 2022, 6 in 2023 and 41 as of October 2024. As of December 2025, Pakistan reported approximately 30 wild poliovirus cases for the year, a decrease from 74 in 2024.

Though the polio immunization campaign in the country started in 1974, the efforts for eradication officially started in 1994. The infection remains endemic despite over 100 rounds of vaccination being carried out in the past decade. Pakistan had the world's highest number of polio cases in 2014.

== Pakistan Polio Eradication Programme ==
Since 1994, the Pakistan Polio Eradication Programme has been fighting to end the crippling poliovirus from the country. The initiative is driven by up to 339,521 trained and dedicated polio workers, the largest surveillance network in the world, quality data collection and analysis, behavioral change communication, state of the art laboratories, and some of the best epidemiologists and public health experts in Pakistan and the world.

== Eradication efforts in the 20th century ==
The Expanded Programme of Immunization (EPI) was begun in Pakistan by the World Health Organization (WHO) in the 1970s to combat deaths from six vaccine-preventable diseases. In 1980, the EPI had vaccinated just 2% of the population against polio; by 1990, the coverage had increased to 54%. In a 1994 interview, CDC officials predicted total polio eradication in Pakistan within two to three years; by 1995, the WHO projected total eradication by the year 2000, a target that the organization reaffirmed in 1998.

However, despite donor attention, the rate of vaccinations sagged. By 1991, only 83 percent of Pakistani children had been vaccinated. Research by the Center for Disease Control (CDC) in April 1998 cited a failure to vaccinate, vaccine failure, and inadequate immunization strategies as causes for the continued incidence of polio in this time. Reasons for under-vaccination included the population being uninformed, considering vaccination unimportant, and having to travel long distances to vaccination sites. In response to these challenges, organizations including the WHO, United Nations Children's Fund (UNICEF), CDC, Rotary International, and the Bill and Melinda Gates Foundation collaborated to develop and fund intensive eradication campaigns, including door-to-door vaccinations.

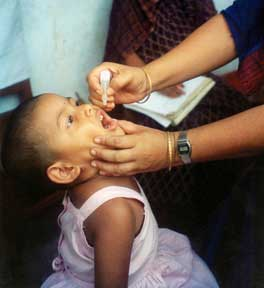
A child receives the oral polio vaccine (USAID).

== 21st century ==
In March 2001, about 27 million children were vaccinated across the country in the hope that Pakistan could be virus-free by the end of that year. As of 2004, when there were 30 million children in Pakistan under the age of five, about 200,000 health workers were required for a vaccination campaign that was carried out eight times a year. A documentary, Polio True Stories, was aired on several television channels to make people aware of the problems facing people affected by the disease.

Opposition to the polio vaccination program by militant groups continues to thwart the success of eradication efforts. In 2014, the number of polio cases in the country reached 306, the highest it had been since 2000.

In August 2015, the country launched an injectable polio vaccine intended to treat four million children and bring Pakistan closer to its goal of eradication by 2016. While the new vaccine is pricier than the traditional oral polio vaccine (OPV) and requires that a doctor or nurse administer it, the injection needs only one dose, not repeated doses, to generate immunity.

In April 2019, over 25,000 children were rushed to the hospital during a mass panic over the spread of false rumors that the polio vaccine causes fainting and vomiting.

In June 2022, officials believed that a new outbreak was caused by some health workers helping parents avoid vaccinations by falsely marking a child's fingers, indicating they have been vaccinated for polio while remaining unvaccinated.

In response to the 2024 resurgence, the Pakistan Polio Eradication Programme implemented the National Emergency Action Plan (July 2024–June 2025), focusing on improved access, community trust, and integration with routine immunization. Multiple nationwide campaigns in 2025 vaccinated over 45 million children each round, with the final drive in December 2025.

=== Connection to the assassination of Osama bin Laden ===
Leading up to the early 2000s, Pakistani vaccination workers were making notable progress in eliminating the polio virus in the highly infected areas of Gadap, Quetta Block (Quetta, Pishin, Kila Abdullah Districts), FATA (Federally Administered Tribal Areas), Khyber Pakhtunkhwa, Peshawar and the neighboring areas of Mardan, Charsaddah, Nowshehra and Lakki Marwat.

In 2011, the U.S. Central Intelligence Agency (CIA) employed the services of Pakistani doctor, Shakil Afridi, and local health officials to stage a fake vaccination campaign in an attempt to confirm Osama bin Laden's location in Abbottabad. This ruse was organized in an effort to gain more knowledge on Bin Laden's whereabouts prior to Operation Neptune Spear. While it is still unknown if Afridi was aware of the implications for his services in the campaign, the main goal of the CIA was to collect DNA samples of Osama bin Laden's children from blood left on the needles used to deliver the Hepatitis B vaccination.

The CIA's false vaccination campaign has had severe lasting effects on the North West corner of Pakistan. Since 2012, at least 70 polio workers have been killed in Pakistan. Many of the attacks have been claimed by the Pakistani Taliban, who forward claims that the vaccination campaigns are a facade for intelligence gathering. The fake Hepatitis B campaign has caused people to question the motivations behind all vaccination campaigns, leading to a spike in poliomyelitis cases from 198 in 2011 to 306 cases in 2014. Many citizens of both the US and various other nations have criticized the CIA's vaccination campaign for the effects that it has had on Pakistan's public health.

=== Recent government efforts ===
In 2015, the Khyber Pakhtunkhwa government had issued arrest warrants for 1,200 parents and guardians for refusing to administer vaccine to their children. 512 people were arrested on the charge but were later freed after signing an undertaking that they would not oppose vaccination.

By 2015, new cases of polio had dropped by 70% as compared to 2014, due to increased vaccination in parts of the northwest Pakistan that had previously been under the control of militants. These areas were secured by Pakistani forces in the Zarb-e-Azb Campaign against Taliban militants. Previously, vaccination teams were forbidden by militants from vaccinating children in the area.

Polio cases in Pakistan increased significantly in 2024 compared to the previous year, with increases in cases being reported across 71 districts. The majority of cases were reported in Balochistan, where on the border in Afghanistan cases had been surging as well. This was in part due to many children not receiving their scheduled polio vaccinations during the year, such as in September 2024 where a reported 1 million children missed vaccinations. Militant attacks on polio workers also increased during the year, with 27 attacks being reported in Khyber Pakhtunkhwa as of October 2024. Owing to this, on 28 October 2024 the Pakistani government launched an initiative to vaccinate 45 million children.

=== Current Statistics ===
Twenty cases of WPV were reported throughout 2022. In 2023, only six cases of WPV were reported. As of October in 2024, this number had increased to 41 cases of WPV across 71 districts.

From 8 May to 17 June 2025, the National Reference Laboratory detected wild Wild Poliovirus Type 1 (WPV1) in 28 sewage samples from 20 districts. During the April 2025 anti-polio campaign, 60,906 documented refusals of oral polio vaccines were reported; with 39,073 refusals in Sindh (37,000 in Karachi) and 3,500 in Balochistan, while Khyber Pakhtunkhwa registered a 0.4% refusal rate.

Increased significantly in 2024, with 74 confirmed wild poliovirus type 1 (WPV1) cases reported, primarily in Balochistan, Khyber Pakhtunkhwa, and Sindh provinces. This marked a setback from the low of six cases in 2023. By December 2025, cases had decreased to around 30, attributed to intensified nationwide campaigns targeting over 45 million children.

== Factors affecting eradication ==
Some of the reasons which affect the eradication of polio are political unrest, poor health infrastructure, and government negligence. The most afflicted areas are those where militants are present and the government lacks absolute control, such as the Federally Administered Tribal Areas. Transmission of the virus from such areas then leads to spread through other parts of the country.

Vaccine hesitancy and refusals persisted into 2025, with over 60,000 documented refusals during the April 2025 campaign, concentrated in Sindh and Balochistan.

=== Misinformation campaigns ===
Misinformation on social media, including claims of infertility or foreign plots, remained a barrier, though countered by community engagement efforts. Due to the fact that the vaccines are primarily produced in the western countries, militant groups like Tehrik-i-Taliban propagandize that they have been made out of pig fat or contain alcohol, two things that are strictly forbidden in Islam. Some clerics have also denounced the vaccines. There is also a myth prevalent in many of the areas with low literacy rates that the immunization sterilizes the local population.

Around early 2012, it was reported that some parents refused to get their children vaccinated in Khyber Pakhtunkhwa and FATA on religious grounds but overall religious refusals in the rest of the country have "decreased manifold".

Both major sides of the Afghani civil war now support the polio vaccination, and polio rates are steadily declining rapidly in Afghanistan, with only seven cases in 2015 (as of August 18, 2015). In Pakistan there were 29 cases in the same period, with organizational difficulties slowing immunization, but more than ten million children have been vaccinated in 2015. This is the last remaining region with active polio cases as of 2015.

==== The potential role of Saudi Arabia ====
Some researchers point to the unique role that Saudi Arabia is able to play in the affairs of the Muslim-majority Pakistan, both as the site of the annual Islamic pilgrimage (the Hajj) and as the seat of formal Islamic authority, in terms of the ability to pass fatawa and shape public opinion. Given that over 10% (200,000) of the Hajj pilgrims are Pakistani, Saudi Arabia has a vested interest in eradication campaigns in Pakistan to prevent spread during Hajj. One possible avenue for the Muslim world to eliminate the polio threat is to have local mosques and community centres promote vaccination, emphasizing that the sanctity of life is foremost in Islam. If supported by national and international Muslim organisations, with the aid of world health agencies and Muslim public health scholars, this policy could reduce the extent of misinformation the Taliban is able to spread.

=== Poor health infrastructure ===
Pakistan's healthcare system is burdened by poor public-sector funding, an ill-regulated private sector, and a lack of governmental transparency, all of which contribute to limiting the quality of public health services. Though the Polio Eradication Initiative is well funded, it is delivered through the underfunded public infrastructure. Members of the Polio Eradication Committee in Pakistan have also expressed concerns regarding the accountability of the organizations backing the campaign.

Since the number of cases began to rise following the raid on the Osama bin Laden compound, organizations including local health authorities, government workers, WHO, and UNICEF have been asserting blame rather than addressing the public health issues at hand. The public health system provides various avenues for institutionalized malpractice, wherein resources are leached. Staff misconduct is common, where staff members remain absent from duty, fail to run field operations, and divert vaccine for use in private facilities. This can result in the attachment of costs to services intended to be free.

=== Climate ===
Fecal-oral transmission is the most common source of transmission of the poliovirus in developing countries, including Pakistan. In addition to the poor health and water sanitation infrastructure, the transmission of the virus is also heightened because of the high population density and climate conditions. Studies have indicated that the polio vaccine has reduced per-dose efficacy in areas near the Tropics, including Pakistan and its neighboring country India. As a consequence of the climate in South Asia, sometimes ten or more doses of the vaccine need to be administered, each a month apart, in order to ensure immunity. The month-long spacing can itself be a reason for families not to complete the vaccination schedule, because transportation could prove unreliable from month to month, and parents might be unable to take time off of work for risk of losing the day's income or losing their job entirely.

The threat of natural disaster also plays a role in delaying total eradication of polio. For example, Pakistan is prone to earthquakes and heavy monsoon rains. In the 2010 Pakistan floods, of the 20 million affected, a majority were in the lowest socioeconomic percentile. In addition to cases of dengue fever, cholera, and measles, the WHO reported an upsurge in cases of polio. By November 2010, Pakistan accounted for about 62% of all polio cases from endemic countries, with most new cases being from areas affected by the floods.

=== Perceptions of Pakistani parents ===
Another reason for the resistance to the polio vaccine is one of mindset. There is a common perception that other issues are more pressing than vaccination. A manifestation of this is the policy perspective that, if the source of the virus is contaminated drinking water, efforts should be made to purify the water rather than focus on the treatment of disease caused by ingesting the water. Surveys of the Pakistani population show that a significant number feel that the allocation of funding to prevent the problem is more efficient than retroactive treatment once the problem (the spread of polio) has already happened.

Additionally, it has been shown that low parental - specifically, maternal - literacy and knowledge regarding vaccines and immunization schedules, poor socioeconomic status, and residence in rural areas all are attributable to decreased rates of immunization completion. Parental education is one of the most important determiners of whether children will complete their vaccinations. In a study of two-parent households in Pakistan, it was shown that the father's knowledge about health most impacted immunization decisions, with an effect so large that some researchers contend improving education will improve health more so than even the provision of health services.

=== Militant opposition to vaccine distribution ===
Militant attacks on vaccination teams continued, contributing to access challenges in insecure areas. On 13 January 2016, a suicide bomber detonated himself near security personal vehicles close to a polio centre in a town near Quetta, Balochistan. The bombing killed at least 15 people, including 13 policemen and one soldier, and wounding another 25. Both Tehrik-i-Taliban Pakistan and Jaishul Islam organizations claimed responsibility for the attack.

In another attack on 30 November 2022, a suicide bombing of a police truck in Quetta killed 3 people and injured 27 others. The police were travelling to protect polio vaccinators.

On 12 September 2024, a polio worker and a policeman were killed by a gunman affiliated with Tehrik-i-Taliban Pakistan.

=== Other factors ===
Widespread malnutrition in Pakistani children is a factor in lowered resistance to disabling diseases and reduced efficacy of the polio vaccine.

In 2019 there were allegedly 'a dozen' cases of the most dangerous P2 strain from vaccine mismanagement.

== Impact of polio in Pakistan ==
Polio has had drastic effects on the health of the population of Pakistan and on the nation's healthcare infrastructure and economy. The WHO estimates that 65–75% of polio cases in developing countries occur in children under 3 years of age, with 95% of all cases occurring in children under 5 years of age. Researchers at the School of Public Health at Johns Hopkins University quantified the disease burden of various diseases in Pakistan; in the year 1990, a Pakistani person with polio averaged a loss of 1.13 healthy life years to the disease. The duration of disability of polio, averaged over 1000 people, was 81.84 years, the equivalent of diseases including diphtheria, childhood meningitis, and measles.

There has been limited research into the impacts of polio in Pakistan in recent years, but a 1988 health survey found that the most common handicaps among individuals with polio were associated with mobility, occupation, and social integration. The survey found differences in participants based on whether they lived in a village or a slum area: there was a higher rate of disability in the village population, and higher frequencies of infectious, respiratory, and digestive diseases in the slum area. Both areas saw individuals with polio have a higher incidence of musculoskeletal system diseases, as well as infections of the ear, and respiratory tract. Given 1–2 years with occupational therapists, 80% of patients with handicaps showed improvement in function.

== See also ==
- Polio
- Eradication of polio
- Vaccination
- Polio vaccine
