= Iskandariya suicide bombing =

2016 terrorist attack in Iraq

- Part of War in Iraq
- Location: Iskandariya, Babil Governorate, Iraq
- Date: 25 March 2016
- Attack type: Suicide bombing
- Deaths: 41+
- Injuries: 105+
- Perpetrator: Islamic State

A suicide bomber blew himself up in a crowd after a local football game in the village of al-Asriya, near Iskandariya in the Babil Governorate, in a mixed Sunni-Shiite area on 25 March 2016. The bombing killed at least 41 people and wounded more than 105. The Mayor Ahmed Shaker was among those killed in the explosion; he succumbed to his wounds in a hospital. The Islamic State claimed responsibility for attack, claiming those targeted were members of the Popular Mobilization Forces.

The bombing occurred as trophies were being presented after a football tournament. According to eyewitnesses, the bomber went through the crowd to approach the centre and blew himself up during the mayor's presentation of the awards. Many of the victims were young boys; according to an Iraqi official, at least 17 boys between the ages of 10 and 16 were killed.

== Reactions ==
- Three days of mourning were declared in the Babil Governorate following the attack.
- United Nations: Secretary General Ban Ki-moon, who was visiting Iraq at the time, condemned the attack.
- FIFA: Gianni Infantino, President of FIFA, said "it is a very sad day, when people, going to a match together, become the victims of such violence."
- Asian Football Confederation: AFC condemned the bombing by issuing a statement that said "Using football and sport stadiums as a stage for these heinous acts of violence is a cowardly, completely unjust and indiscriminate act."
