= Miqdadiyah =

Miqdadiyah المقدادية (Arabic) شارەبان (Kurdish)
- Location within Iraq
- Coordinates: 33°58′43.0″N 44°56′13.0″E
- Country: Iraq
- Governorate: Diyala
- Municipality: Al-Miqdadiya District

Population (2014)
  - Total: 155,968

Miqdadiyah (Arabic: المقدادية; Kurdish: شارەبان, Şareban (Shareban, Sharaban)) is a city in the Diyala Governorate of Iraq. Its population is a mix of Arab, Kurdish and Turkmen. The city is located about 80 km (50 mi) northeast of Baghdad and 30 km (19 mi) northeast of Baquba.

== Etymology ==
The etymology of the name Miqdad or Miqdadiyah stands for Persian "Given by the Magi", in the same way as the name Baghdad stands "Given by God".
