= Sha'ab, Baghdad =

Neighborhood in Baghdad

Coordinates: 33°24′54″N 44°24′34″E

Sha'ab (Arabic: الشعب) is a neighborhood of Adhamiyah district, Baghdad, Iraq, It is subdivided into Sha'ab east (22nd), Sha'ab south (23rd), Sha'ab north (24th). The neighborhood is almost entirely Shia Muslim, especially after the Shia militias' takeover of the town in 2006. This was led by the Mahdi Army known as the JAM which committed mass murders against Sunni families in order to create a Shia zone in Baghdad.
