= Timeline of the Islamic State (2025) =

2025 ISIS-related events, including airstrikes and bombings

This is a timeline of Islamic State (ISIS)-related events that occurred in 2025.

== Timeline ==
=== January ===
- 1 January – 2025 New Orleans truck attack: An ISIS inspired man drove a pickup truck into a crowd on Bourbon Street in New Orleans, Louisiana, United States, then exited the truck and engaged in a shootout with police before being fatally shot. Fifteen people were killed, including the perpetrator, and at least fifty-seven others were injured.
- 2 January – Syrian Democratic Forces (SDF), enabled by United States Central Command (CENTCOM) forces, conducted a D-ISIS operation, near Dayr az-Zawr, Syria, resulting in the capture of an ISIS attack cell leader. The operation lasted until 3 January.
- 7 January – Four SDF fighters were killed in an attack by two ISIS gunmen in the Jazara Mashhour area in western Deir ez-Zor countryside, Syria.
- 10 January:
  - The Iraqi Air Force conducted an airstrike in the Hamrin Mountains, Diyala Province, resulting in four members of the Islamic State, including two senior leaders being killed.
  - SDF kill four ISIS militants in a coalition-backed SDF security operation in the Bako area in Al-Hasakah countryside, Syria.
- 11 January – The Hayat Tahrir al Sham (HTS)-led Syrian interim government thwarted an attempted suicide bombing attack on the Sayyidah Zeinab shrine, a prominent Shia shrine outside Damascus.
- 15 January:
  - At least ten people are killed in an attack by the Allied Democratic Forces (ISCAP) on the village of Makoko in Lubero Territory, North Kivu.
  - An SDF fighter was executed by ISIS cells and his body was dumped in the western part of Abu Khashab town in the western countryside of Deir ez-Ezor, Syria.
  - Several ISIS fighters were killed and five were captured—including foreign fighters—in an offensive by Puntland Security Forces in Cal Miskaad mountains in the Bari region. The operation also led to the destruction of 8 militant bases. 9 explosive drones were also shot down during the operation.
- 22 January – A Chinese national in Takhar Province, Afghanistan was killed in a shooting. ISIS-K claimed responsibility for the attack.
- 25 January: An offensive carried out by Puntland Security Forces captured a major militant base and killed 13 ISIS militants in Cal Miskaad mountains in the Bari region. Since the start of the offensive the security forces have destroyed or captured more than 100 bases and liberated 260 km of territory.
- 26 January – Malam-Fatori Suicide Bombing: An Islamic State suicide bomber drove a vehicle with explosives into a convoy of Nigerian troops that were targeting ISWAP militants in Malam-Fatori, Borno State, Nigeria, killing himself and 27 soldiers. Several other troops were critically injured.
- 31 January:
  - CENTCOM forces, conducted precision airstrikes in the vicinity of Kirkuk, Iraq, killing five ISIS operatives.
  - Uganda announced that it was going to deploy Ugandan People's Defence Force troops to its border with eastern Congo due to the worsening security situation against the Allied Democratic Forces insurgency.

=== February ===
- 1 February – United States Africa Command (USAFRICOM) forces conducted airstrikes in the Golis Mountains, Somalia, killing a senior ISIS attack planner and other “key figures” of the ISIL group.
- 3 February – Senior ISIL Somalia commander, Abdirahman Shirwac Aw-Saciid, head of the group's assassination squad, surrendered to authorities in the Cal Miskaad mountains, in the northeastern Puntland state.
- 4 February – Puntland security forces attacked Islamic State fighters, near the village of Qurac. Islamic State responded with drones, suicide attacks and infantry charges. Regional officials said Somali forces lost 15 soldiers in the fighting and at least 57 Islamic State fighters were killed.
- 6 February – A SDF fighter was killed and another wounded in an ISIS attack in Deir ez-Zor, Syria.
- 7 February – Allied Democratic forces raided Christian Villages and killed residents in North Kivu and Ituri Provinces
- 9 February – SDF commando forces conducted a precise security operation aimed at dismantling an ISIS terrorist cell in the town of Markada in the southern countryside of Al-Shaddadi, Hasaka, Syria.
- 10 February:
  - CENTCOM forces conducted an airstrike in the vicinity of Kirkuk, Iraq, killing two ISIS operatives.
  - One ISIS fighter was shot dead and another blew himself up during an SDF raid in Markadah town in the southern Al-Hasakah countryside, Syria.
- 11 February – ISIS carried out a counterattack against Somali forces in the Togjaceel valley, in the Cal Miskaad mountains, Puntland. Regional officials said Somali forces lost 28 soldiers and more than 70 Islamic State fighters were killed.
- 12 February:
  - CENTCOM forces conducted an airstrike in the vicinity of Rawa, Iraq, killing five ISIS operatives.
- 13 February – SDF's Military Operations Teams (TOL) conducted a security operation against and an ISIS terrorist cell in the countryside of Deir ez-Zor and capturing the cell leader, Abdul Rahman Al-Aziz, along with two other terrorists.
- 15 February – 2025 Villach stabbing attack: A 23-year-old Syrian carried out a series of random stabbings against six pedestrians. The attack resulted in the death of a 14-year-old boy and injuries to five other individuals. Police later recovered a recording of the suspect swearing an oath of allegiance to the Islamic State.
- 16 February – USAFRICOM forces conducted airstrikes in the Puntland region of Somalia, killing at least 16 militants including two senior militants identified as the group's bomb-makers and a bomb manufacturing factory was also destroyed.
- 18 February – Commander of the Syrian Democratic Forces states that they are open to removing foreign fighters and handing over security matters, including those related to ISIS, to the new Syrian government.
- 19 February – Morocco's General Directorate for Territorial Surveillance's (DGST) Central Bureau of Judicial Investigation (BCIJ) successfully thwarted an ISIS-instigated terror plot, arrested 12 individuals. Multiple raids was carried out simultaneously in the cities of Laayoune, Casablanca, Fez, Taounate, Tangier, Azemmour, Guersif, Oulad Teima, and Tamsna.
- 20 February – Security Service of Georgia conducted operations against militants affiliated with IS.
- 21 February – Turkey security forces arrested an Uzbek national with ties to ISIS, having been accused of plotting attacks on Jewish sites
- 25 February – United Kingdom forces, conducted precision airstrikes across the Aleppo region of Syria against ISIS.
- 26 February – A Tajik national was arrested in Brooklyn by American authorities on charges that he conspired to support ISIS and ISIS-K by facilitating US$70,000 in payments to ISIS-affiliated individuals in Turkey and Syria.
- 28 February – 2025 Darul Uloom Haqqania bombing: A suicide bombing in Akora Khattak, Pakistan during Friday prayers, resulting in the deaths of at least seven individuals, including the prominent cleric and head of the seminary, Hamid Ul Haq Haqqani. Additionally, approximately 20 others sustained injuries.

=== March ===
- 2 March – A 17-year-old Arab-Israeli is arrested in Jisr az-Zarqa, Israel on suspicion of planning terror attack after swearing loyalty to ISIS. At the time of his detainment, he was carrying documents detailing explosives production.
- 3 March – Russia's Federal Security Service (FSB) thwart a series of terrorist attacks on the Moscow metro and a Jewish religious institution in the Moscow region. The man accused of planning the attacks was killed in a confrontation with security forces.
- 4 March – SDF conduct a raid campaign that included several homes in the town of Al-Hussainiya, north of Deir Ezzor. Syria and arrested Ahmed Issa Al-Dawoud, Mahmoud Issa Al-Dawoud, Ali Issa Al-Dawoud, Omar Issa Al-Dawoud, Mohammed Al-Habish, and Anas Al-Habish.
- 5 March – Russian counter-terrorism forces killed four ISIS-K affiliated militants who were plotting an attack against a regional branch of the interior ministry in the mainly Muslim region of Dagestan.
- 6 March – Syrian Democratic Forces, enabled by CENTCOM forces, conducted a raid in the vicinity of Shahil, Syria and captured Salah Mohammad Al-Abdullah, an ISIS cell leader.
- 7 March – Abdulrahman Mohammed Hafedh Alqaysi, a former Iraqi refugee and legal permanent resident of Richmond, Texas, pled guilty to conspiracy to provide material support to a designated foreign terrorist organisation. From 2015 to 2020 Alqaysi admitted to providing material support and resources to the media arm of the Islamic State of Iraq and al-Sham group known as the Kalachnikov team.
- 10 March – A SDF member was killed in an ISIS attack in eastern Deir ez-Zor, Syria.
- 12 March:
  - Syrian Democratic Forces conducted a raid in al-Hol camp, southeast of Al-Hasakah, arresting Salah Abdullah al-Abd, an ISIS cell leader and financier.
  - An Asayish member was killed and two others were injured in an ambush by ISIS cells in the Al-Hazima area in Al-Raqqa, Syria.
- 13 March:
  - Israeli police and the Israel Security Agency (Shin Bet) arrested a Tayibe man, suspected of collaborating with and pledging allegiance to ISIS. The Tayibe man is suspected of filming Israel Defense Forces (IDF) en route to Tulkarm and sharing footage via Telegram to help terrorists prepare for an ambush.
  - CENTCOM forces, with support and coordination of the Iraqi security forces, conducted an airstrike killing a head of the Islamic State in Iraq and Syria, Abdullah Maki Musleh al-Rifai. Abdullah Maki Musleh al-Rifai was the Global ISIS #2 leader, Chief of Global Operations, and the Delegated Committee Emir, effectively holding a top leadership position within the organization. One other ISIS operative was also killed.
  - Puntland Security Forces conduct a raid against an ISIS hideouts in the Lugta-Huraanhur and Togga Raq-raq areas of the Al Miskaad mountains in the Bari region mountains, Somalia. They killed a senior Islamic State commander responsible for directing drone attacks and PSF officers captured multiple drones armed with explosives.
- 15 March – Iraqi security forces capture Umm Hussein, the wife of the former leader of the Islamic State in Iraq and Syria Abdullah Maki Musleh al-Rifai and two additional ISIS terrorists during an operation.
- 19 March:
  - SDF and International Coalition Forces launched a joint security campaign in SDF-controlled Al-Salhabiyah town in the countryside of Al-Raqqah, arresting several suspects for “belonging to ISIS."
  - Two SDF fighters were wounded in an ISIS IED attack in Al-Jarthei town, Deir ez-Zor, Syria.
  - Syrian Democratic Forces, enabled by International Coalition forces, conducted a raid in the vicinity of Tabqa, Syria and captured Raafat Rahmoun, the military emir of the IS territories al-Barakah and al-Khayr, which roughly correspond to Hasaka and Deir ez-Zor.
- 20 March – A 19-year old West Australian man is sentenced to three years’ imprisonment by the Perth District Court on one count of transmitting violent extremist material online and one count of using a carriage service to cause offence after sharing Islamic State-produced videos that included beheadings and recordings encouraging violence. He is the first person convicted and sentenced in Australia for transmitting violent extremist material online under the new Commonwealth offence introduced in January 2024 as part of amendments to Australian counter-terrorism legislation.
- 21 March:
  - Iraqi security forces arrested two Islamic State militants in a village in eastern Salahuddin province.
  - The Iraqi Counter Terrorism Service (CTS), in cooperation with the Operations Directorate of the Kurdistan Region's Asayish Service, conducted an operation in which two Islamic State militants were arrested, one in Salahuddin province and the other in Sulaymaniyah province in northern Iraq's semi-autonomous region of Kurdistan. The operations also resulted in the destruction of 4 ISIS hideouts, a tunnel, and a cave between the provinces of Kirkuk and Salahuddin, the Hamrin Mountains and Hatra Island.
  - Five jihadists were found guilty of holding French journalists Didier Francois, Edouard Elias, Nicolas Henin, and Pierre Torres captive in Syria between June 2013 and April 2014 for Islamic State. Two of the five militants were sentenced in absentia, having believed to be deceased.
  - Fambita mosque attack: The Islamic State – Sahel Province (ISSP) targeted a mosque in the southwestern Niger town of Fambita, Kokorou, during Ramadan prayer services, killing at least forty-four civilians and injuring thirteen others. The militants also set ablaze the local marketplace and several residential structures.
- 22 March – Two ISIS militants opened fire on a civilian and his car oil stores in Al-Hawayej Village in the eastern countryside of Deir ez-Zor for “not paying zakat.”
- 24 March – USAFRICOM forces conducted airstrikes in the Cal Miskaad Mountains, Somalia, targeting militants entrenched in the Miiraale Valley.
- 25 March:
  - Syrian Democratic Forces, supported by International Coalition forces, launched a security operation in the town of Al-Tuwaina in the countryside of Heseke, arresting ISIS militant Abdullah Khedir Nasser Al-Froukh.
  - USAFRICOM forces, in coordination with the Federal Government of Somalia, conducted airstrikes in the vicinity of the Golis Mountains, Somalia.
- 26 March – ISIS militants attack a SDF position in Al-Janynah, Deir Ezzor, Syria with an RPG
- 27 March:
  - Two ISIS militants shoot opened fire on a civilian and his car oil stores in Al-Hawayej Village in the eastern countryside of Deir ez-Zor for “not paying zakat.”
  - German Foreign Minister Annalena Baerbock call on Syria to join the anti-ISIS coalition while on high-profile delegation to Damascus, where she met with Ahmed al-Sharaa and oversaw the reopening of Germany's embassy after a 13-year diplomatic hiatus.
- 29 March – USAFRICOM forces, in coordination with the Federal Government of Somalia, conducted airstrikes in the Southeast of Bosasso, Puntland and the Cal Miskaad Mountains, Somalia.

=== April ===
- 1 April:
  - The U.S. Department of the Treasury’s (Treasury) Financial Crimes Enforcement Network (FinCEN) Issues Advisory on the Financing of ISIS
  - 2025 Duhok axe attack: An ISIS militant with an axe attacked Assyrian celebrants during Babylonian-Assyrian New Year celebrations in Duhok City, Kurdistan Region, Iraq, injuring one man and one woman.
  - USAFRICOM forces, on the request of the Federal Government of Somalia, conducted airstrikes in the Southeast of Bosasso, Puntland, Somalia.
- 3 April – The Syrian transitional government in Damascus submitted a renewed request to join U.S.-led Global Coalition in its campaign against the Islamic State, citing growing diplomatic momentum from France, Germany, and Saudi Arabia.
- 4 April – Iraqi forces conducted an airstrike in Al-Anbar, Iraq, destroying a vehicle laden with weapons, ammunition, and explosives.
- 5 April – Kurdish-led Internal Security Forces (Asayish) launch a two day anti-ISIS operation against Islamic State cells in Roj camp, which houses families with links to the jihadist group in the Democratic Autonomous Administration of North and East Syria (AANES). Security forces aims to disrupt covert ISIS networks, confiscate extremist propaganda, and arrest individuals suspected of involvement in recent attacks or of inciting violence within the camp.
- 7 April:
  - A Turkish asylum seeker in the UK is jailed for 45 months after pleading guilty to five charges related to the online distribution of terrorist publications and one count of expressing support for a proscribed organisation. The Turkish national had been posting videos on social media glorifying ISIS and terrorists Osama bin Laden and Abu Bakr Al Baghdadi.
  - Two gunmen on a motorcycle opened fire with a machine gun at an SDF military vehicle in the town of Namliya, in rural northern Deir ez-Zor.
- 9 April – ISIS recruiter ‘Umm Nutella’ is sentenced to 230 Months (19 years) Imprisonment for Recruiting for ISIS, Obstruction, and Attempting to Flee Justice. The woman conspired to provide material support and resources to the Islamic State.
- 11 April – USAFRICOM forces, in coordination with the Federal Government of Somalia, conducted an airstrike in the Southeast of Bosasso, Puntland, Somalia.
- 12 April:
  - U.S.-led Global Coalition has declined the Syrian transitional government’s request to join its campaign against the Islamic State.
  - Iraqi forces conducting operations on the movements of ISIS fighters in a village in the subdistrict of Riyaz in Kirkuk, kill two ISIS leaders and destroy their hideout, along with confiscating weapons and explosives.
  - Iraqi forces arrest a former member of the ISIS's "Islamic Police" in Mosul.
- 13 April:
  - Three separate attacks on the Syrian Democratic Forces occur in the Deir ez-Zor countryside, Syria, in the towns of Shuhail, Diban and al-Hejjnah. Two SDF fighters were killed and another three were injured. ISIS claimed responsibility for the two attacks in Shuhail and Diban through affiliated media channels but did not claimed responsibility for the simultaneous attack in al-Hejjnah.
  - Iraqi forces conducted an airstrike in the Saladin Governorate, Iraq, killing two fighters, including a senior leader.
- 14 April:
  - Iraqi forces conduct a raid in Saladin province and captured four ISIS members including a senior figure. The senior figure is the "Shari'a Wali (governor)" of the Sulaiman Bek sector and confessed during interrogation to carrying out attacks against security forces in previous terrorist assaults in the Duluiya district.
  - Head of Iraq's National Security Service, Abdul Karim Abdul Fadel issued a warning regarding attempts by ISIS mercenaries in Syria to carry out an assault on the al-Hol camp on the southern outskirts of the town of al-Hawl in northern Syria, close to the Syria-Iraq border, which holds individuals displaced from the Islamic State of Iraq and the Levant.
- 15 April:
  - April 2025 Mastung Bus Bombing: Three Pakistan police officers are killed and 20 others injured in a remote-controlled bomb attack that targeted a police bus in Mastung city, Balochistan, Pakistan. The bomb was planted on a parked motorcycle and detonated when the police bus, carrying 40 policemen, passed on its way to Quett from Kalat.
  - The Kurdish-led Syrian Democratic Forces rescue a Yazidi man who was abducted and held captive by the Islamic State for around 11 years, from when he was just eight years old.
- 16 April – Turkish authorities arrest 89 individuals suspected of being affiliated with the Islamic State during coordinated security operations in 17 provinces, including Istanbul, Antalya, Gaziantep, Hatay and Van.
- 17 April:
  - ISIS shoot dead a man from Abu Hardoub town in SDF controlled Al-Marawaniyah, Deir Ezzor, Syria for practicing “witchcraft” and committing “heresy."
  - An American man pleaded guilty in the U.S. District Court for the Eastern District of New York for trying to support ISIS by traveling to Saudi Arabia with intent to join them in Syria.
  - An Afghan national in the United States pleaded guilty to obtaining firearms in connection with a plot to conduct an ISIS-Inspired terrorist attack on 5 November 2024, the election day for the 2024 United States presidential election. The man and a co-conspirator received two rifles and 500 rounds of ammunition with the knowledge that the firearms would be used for terrorist attack, they were both arrested in October 2024
- 18 April:
  - USAFRICOM forces, in coordination with the Federal Government of Somalia, conducted a collective self-defense airstrike in the Southeast of Bosasso, Puntland, in Northeastern Somalia.
  - Internal Security Forces, with support and coordination of the Syrian Democratic Forces and Women's Protection Units (YPJ) launch an operation in Hol Camp in North-East Syria.
  - Puntland regional forces conducted a prolonged and intense military operation against entrenched Islamic State (ISIS) militants in the Dooxada Miraale area, in the Bari region, Somalia following a prolonged and intense military operation on Friday. The direct confrontation that lasted nearly 12 hours.
- 19 April:
  - Internal Security Forces, with support and coordination of the SDF and YPJ arrest 16 ISIS mercenaries during combined operations inside and around the Hol Camp in North-East Syria.
  - Islamic State militants attack a safari camp in Niassa Reserve, northern Mozambique. Two civilians are beheaded and six soldiers killed.
- 20 April – Internal Security Forces, with support and coordination of the SDF and YPJ arrest 4 ISIS mercenaries during combined operations inside and around the Hol Camp in North-East Syria.
- 21 April:
  - Peshmerga forces and the Iraqi Army launched a joint military sweep in "Sector 8" (the districts of Mahmoudiya, Sinjar and Zummar) west of the Tigris River in a coordinated security campaign targeting the remnants of ISIS militants.
  - USAFRICOM forces, in coordination with the Federal Government of Somalia, conducted a collective self-defense airstrike in the Southeast of Bosasso, Puntland, in Northeastern Somalia.
- 23 April – Internal Security Forces, with support and coordination of the SDF and YPJ conclude their six-day combined operations inside and around the Hol Camp in North-East Syria, having arrested 20 ISIS affiliates and foiled a mass escape attempt.
- 24 April:
  - Boko Haram militants kill 14 farmers in Gwoza district, Borno State, Nigeria, amid an uptick in regional violence.
  - USAFRICOM forces, in coordination with the Federal Government of Somalia, conducted a collective self-defense airstrike in the Southeast of Bosasso, Puntland, in Northeastern Somalia.
  - A military unit north of Sakoira, Niger was ambushed by ISIS militants resulting in 12 soldiers’ death.
- 25 April – USAFRICOM forces, in coordination with the Federal Government of Somalia, conducted airstrikes in the Southeast of Bosasso, Puntland, Somalia.
- 27 April:
  - Iraqi authorities arrested a suspected member of ISIS for inciting the 2025 New Orleans truck attack after the National Center for International Judicial Cooperation had received a request from the United States to assist in its investigation of the attack.
  - The Kurdish-led Syrian Democratic Forces rescue two Yazidi men who was abducted and held captive by the Islamic State for over a decade.
- 28 April –
  - ISIL militants kill five Kurdish-led Syrian Democratic Forces fighters in an attack in eastern Deir el-Zor, Syria.
  - An improvised explosive device planted by ISWAP kills 26 civilians when a truck hits the device near Rann in Borno State. ISWAP later claimed responsibility for the bombing via Telegram.
- 29 April –
  - Syrian Democratic Forces, supported by International Coalition forces, launched a security operation in the Deir Ezzor countryside, arresting an ISIS bombing cell commander.
  - Islamic State-linked militants attack the Niassa Reserve, killing two anti-poaching scouts and injuring another.
- 30 April – Syrian Democratic Forces repelled an attack by ISIS mercenary cells at a checkpoint in the town of Granij, Deir ez-Zor, Syria. The mercenaries fled after sustaining injuries, leaving behind their weapons and ammunition.

=== May ===
- 2 May – Syrian Democratic Forces, supported by International Coalition forces, launched a targeted security operation in the Deir Ezzor countryside, Syria, arresting an ISIS Leader.
- 3 May – USAFRICOM forces, in coordination with the Federal Government of Somalia, conducted an airstrike against ISIS militants in the Miraale Region, Somalia.
- 4 May – USAFRICOM forces, in coordination with the Federal Government of Somalia, conducted an airstrike against ISIS militants in the Golis Mountains in Northeastern Somalia.
- 5 May – ISIS militants launch two simultaneous attacks against the Syrian Democratic Forces in the towns of Dhiban and Al-Shuhail in the eastern Deir ez-Zor countryside, Syria. The SDF repelled both attacks, forcing the militants to retreat.
- 6 May – Y.A.T. Special Forces of the Syrian Democratic Forces, in coordination with the General Security Service, arrest two ISIS cell members north of Deir ez-Zor, Syria.
- 8 May – ISIS militants launch an attack on a Syrian Democratic Forces military point in the Hawij Dheeban area, in eastern Deir ez-Zor countryside, Syria.
- 9 May – USAFRICOM forces, in coordination with the Federal Government of Somalia, conducted an airstrike southeast of Bosasso, Puntland, Somalia.
- 11 May – USAFRICOM forces, in coordination with the Federal Government of Somalia, conducted several airstrikes against ISIS militants, south of Qandala, Somalia.
- 13 May – A Michigan Man is arrested and charged with attempting to attack a military base on behalf of ISIS after he flew a drone near the United States Army Tank-automotive and Armaments Command (TACOM), and its subordinate Life Cycle Management Command (LCMC) headquarters at the Detroit Arsenal in Warren, Michigan in support of his attack plan.
- 15 May:
  - Syrian Democratic Forces captured ten ISIS mercenaries in the Deir ez-Zor countryside, Syria, along with a quantity of weapons and ammunition.
  - ISIS militants kill one member of the SDF and three others were injured in an attack in the town of Abu Hamam, Syria.
- 17 May:
  - The National Investigation Agency (NIA) arrest two ISIS members at Chhatrapati Shivaji Maharaj International Airport who were wanted in relation to a 2023 case related to the fabrication and testing of IEDs in Pune, Maharashtra.
  - Women's Protection Units (YPJ) conducted an operation in Deir ez-Zor province capturing multiple suspected Islamic State militants.
- 18 May – The Syrian General Security Service and General Intelligence Services conducted a joint security operation targeting a “hideout of an Islamic State terrorist cell” in the eastern neighbourhoods of Aleppo, northern Syria. One Damascus-affiliated security officer was killed, along with three militants during the operations. Four other ISIS militants were arrested.
- 19 May – The Joint Operations Command, in coordination with the Iraqi Air Force, conducted an airstrike against an ISIS hideout, based on intelligence provided by the Military Intelligence Directorate in the Balkana mountain range, east of Salahaddin province, Iraq. The airstrike killed two militants.
- 20 May – The SDF thwarted two separate Islamic State attacks on military checkpoints in Syria's eastern Deir ez-Zor and Hasakah provinces. The SDF suffered no casualties and the two military checkpoints only suffered minor material damage.
- 21 May – Units from the 88th Brigade of the East Salahaddin Operations Command along with intelligence and engineering teams, conduct a followup operation in the Balkana mountain range, east of Salahaddin province, Iraq in which they located the bodies of two militants killed in an airstrike conducted on 19 May.
- 22 May – 2025 Southern Syria bombings: ISIS militants detonated improvised explosive devices (IEDs) targeting Syrian Ministry of Defense (MoD) vehicles in Tulul al Safa, Syria, injuring seven people.
- 23 May – ISIS militants attack an SDF military point in the town of Al-Bahra, Deir ez-Zor, Syria.
- 24 May – The SDF with support from local residents in the town of Darnach, Deir ez-Zor, Syria thwart an ISIS plot against SDF forces. Following a tip-off from local residents about suspicious activity, the SDF surrounded the area, before the ISIS militants opened fire. One ISIS militant was killed, and another escaped.
- 25 May – Syrian Internal Security Force conduct a mass coordinated security operation at multiple locations in the Damascus countryside, including Al-Kiswah, Deir Khabyah, Al-Maqiliba, and Zakiyah, in southwestern Syria.
- 26 May – Shin Bet arrest of three Israeli citizens suspected of plotting terrorist attacks against Israeli forces in cooperation with Islamic State.
- 27 May – Osama Krayem, a Swedish-Syrian convicted terrorist and mass murderer is indicted by Swedish prosecutors on suspicion of his suspected involvement in the capture and murder of Jordanian pilot Moaz al-Kasasbeh, who was burned alive in a cage in Syria in 2015. Krayem is currently in prison for previous terrorist convictions for his role in the November 2015 Paris attacks and the 2016 Brussels bombings.
- 28 May – 2025 Southern Syria bombings: ISIS militants detonate multiple improvised explosive devices targeting fighters from the United States-backed Free Syrian Army and the Syrian army's 70th division in Tulul al Safa, Syria. ISIL claim one fighter was killed and three were injured.
- 29 May – Puntland regional security forces conduct an operation in the Cal Miskaad mountains, Somalia targeting hideouts believed to be used by IS militants in the remote areas of Xal and Walinsoor.
- 31 May – USAFRICOM forces, in coordination with the Federal Government of Somalia, conducted an airstrike 75 km south of Bosasso, Puntland, in northeastern Somalia.

=== June ===
- 1 June – USAFRICOM forces, in coordination with the Federal Government of Somalia, conducted an airstrike 72 km south of Bosasso, Puntland, in northeastern Somalia.
- 2 June:
  - USAFRICOM forces, in coordination with the Federal Government of Somalia, conducted a collective self-defense airstrike in the southeast of Bosasso, Puntland, in northeastern Somalia.
  - An alleged member of the Abu Sayyaf Group was arrested in a raid in Barangay Muti, Zamboanga City.
- 4 June:
  - Iran Arrests 13 ISIS Khorasan Members, Including Leader and Suicide Bombers, in Multi-Province Counter-Terrorism Operation.
  - USAFRICOM forces, in coordination with the Federal Government of Somalia, conducted a collective self-defense airstrike in the southeast of Bosasso, Puntland, in northeastern Somalia.
- 5 June – Israeli Prime Minister Benjamin Netanyahu said that Israel was arming the Popular Forces, a Rafah-based group led by Yasser Abu Shabab, during the Gaza war. The Popular Forces have been linked to IS; some of its prominent figures have been identified as former IS militants who fought in the Sinai insurgency.
- 7 June:
  - Israeli opposition leader, Avigdor Lieberman alleges Israel has been funding IS-linked gangs in Gaza.
  - ISIS militants attack the Al-Subha police station east of Deir ez-Zor, Syria with a hand grenade, then opened fire on the protection point of the First Irrigation Canal station while fleeing, no injuries were reported.
- 10 June:
  - A Pakistani national residing in Canada was extradited to the United States to face charges of attempting to provide material support and resources to a designated foreign terrorist organization (FTO), the Islamic State of Iraq and al-Sham (ISIS) and attempting to commit acts of terrorism transcending national boundaries in connection with a plot to carry out an ISIS-Inspired mass shooting at a Jewish center in New York city.
  - USAFRICOM forces, in coordination with the Federal Government of Somalia, conducted an airstrike southeast of Bosasso, Puntland, in northeastern Somalia.
  - Iran executes nine convicted ISIL fighters after they were found guilty of plotting attacks against Iran in 2018.
  - CENTCOM forces conducted a precision airstrike in Northwest Syria killing one suspected Islamic State.
  - ISIS militants fire upon Internal Security Forces conducting patrols in the eastern countryside of Deir ez-Zor Canton, Syria.
  - British Royal Air Force forces conducted a drone strike in the city of Sarmada, Idlib countryside, Syria targeting and killing an ISIS mercenary.
- 11 June – Kurdish-led Syrian Democratic Forces capture two suspected Islamic State militants in an operation in al-Mansoura, a large town some 25 kilometers southwest of northern Raqqa province, Syria.
- 13 June:
  - USAFRICOM forces, in coordination with the Federal Government of Somalia, conducted an airstrike southeast of Bosasso, Puntland, in northeastern Somalia.
  - An Afghan national pleaded guilty in an Oklahoma City federal court to two terrorism-related offenses in relation to plotting an US election day terror attack in the United States.
- 14 June:
  - Puntland Defence Forces capture a Turkish national fighting alongside the Islamic State in Somalia during ongoing operations, in coordination with USAFRICOM forces, in the Cal Miskaad mountain range.
  - USAFRICOM Airdrops Aid to Puntland Defence Forces Battling ISIS in Cal Miskaad mountain range.
- 15 June:
  - USAFRICOM forces, in coordination with the Federal Government of Somalia, conducted an airstrike southeast of Bosasso, Puntland, in northeastern Somalia.
  - A clash between Mozambique Army and ISIS militants killed 12 ISIS militants in Niassa province in Montepuez district.
- 17 June – ISIS militants attack a vehicle belonging to the Civil Council in the town of Muhaimidah, Deir ez-Zor, Syria, killing one worker.
- 19 June:
  - A Yazidi man is rescued after 11 years of ISIS captivity in Syria's Idlib province.
  - 2025 Banibangou attack: An assault on a Nigerien army base in the tri-border region of Niger, Mali, and Burkina Faso. Several hundred militants on over 200 motorbikes and eight vehicles attacked, killing at least 34 soldiers and wounding 14. Nigerien forces reportedly killed dozens of attackers. The Islamic State claimed responsibility for the assault in a statement released the following day.
- 20 June:
  - ISIS militants attack a Syrian Internal Security's checkpoint in Deir ez-Zor, Syria.
  - Manda massacre: Jihadists from the Islamic State – Sahel Province (ISGS) attacked the village of Manda, Tillabéri Region, Niger, killing at least 71 civilians.
- 22 June – Mar Elias Church attack: A suicide bombing orchestrated by ISIS took place at the Mar Elias church in Damascus, killing 22 people and wounding more than 63.
- 24 June:
  - The Lebanese army captures Islamic State's most senior commander in Lebanon and one of the most prominent leaders of the terrorist organization, “Qaswara.” Qaswara assumed leadership of ISIS operations in Lebanon following the arrest of his predecessor Abu Said al-Shami along with several other ISIS commanders in December 2024.
  - A California man is charged with attempting to provide material support to ISIS.
  - ISIS militants attack a Syrian Internal Security's checkpoint in the town of Darnaj, east of Deir ez-Zor, Syria.
  - Women's Protection Units (YPJ), in cooperation with the SDF, conducted an operation in Al-Shuhail town, east of Deir ez-Zor, Syria, arresting ISIS militants and a senior ISIS commander.
- 25 June – Czech authorities detain five teenagers on suspicion of supporting ISIS after being radicalized online by the militant Islamic group and charged two of them with terror-related crimes over a 2024 attempt to set fire to a synagogue in Brno after a cross-border probe.
- 27 June:
  - A Chicago man is convicted of conspiring to provide material support to ISIS via social media to encourage attacks and attempt recruit new ISIS members. The man was a leader of Khattab Media Foundation, an online organisation that had swore allegiance to ISIS and was created for the means of recruiting members and spreading ISIS propaganda on social media and other online platforms.
  - Thirty-four members of Jamaah Ansharut Daulah in Riau, previously affiliated with the Islamic State, renounced their allegiance to the extremist network and pledged loyalty to the Republic of Indonesia during a ceremony in Pekanbaru.
- 28 June – ISIS India operations head Saquib Nachan, known for his involvement in the 2002 and 2003 bombs at Mumbai Central railway station, Vile Parle and Mulund dies after brain haemorrhage.
- 29 June – Syrian Army and Turkish intelligence services in a joint operation uncovered an ISIS assassination plot against Syrian President Ahmed al-Sharaa. The attack was planned to carry out during a scheduled presidential visit to the city of Daraa, Syria. The alleged leader of the group was arrested 24 hours before the event.

=== July ===
- 1 July – On 1 July 2025, militants believed to be members of the Lakurawa (Note: Lakurawa has links to the Islamic State – Sahel Province) group launched a raid on Kwallajiya, a village in the Tangaza Local Government Area of Sokoto State, Nigeria. Many were preparing for afternoon prayers, with many victims working on their farms.
- 2 July:
  - A district court in Uzbekistan sentences Obid Saparov to 16 years in prison for membership in the Islamic State Khorasan Province, and for his role in a 2022 rocket attack on the Uzbek border city of Termez.
  - 2025 Bajaur bombing: An IED exploded under a government vehicle carrying senior administrative officers, resulting in 5 deaths and 11 injuries. The Islamic State claimed responsibility for the attack
- 15 July – Suspected ISIS attack killed five Asayish members.
- 16 July – 82 suspected Islamic State's Somalia affiliates are arrested in Ethiopia according to a statement released by the National Intelligence Security Services.
- 25 July – 2025 CENTCOM Operation in Al-Bab: CENTCOM in coordination with the Syrian Democratic Forces and the Syrian transitional government conducted a raid in the city of Al-Bab early in the morning, which resulted in the killing of Dhiya’ Zawba Muslih al-Hardani and his two sons, Abdallah Dhiya al-Hardani and Abd al-Rahman Dhiya Zawba al-Hardani who were affiliated with the Islamic State.
- 27 July – Komanda massacre: Islamic State-backed rebels attack the Saint Anuarite Catholic church in Komanda, Zunguluka district, Irumu territory in central Ituri province, Democratic Republic of the Congo (DRC) killing between 43 and 50 people. The attack occurred in the middle of the night, during which ADF rebels targeted a night vigil.
- 31 July – Osama Krayem, a Swedish-Syrian convicted Islamic terrorist and mass murderer for his role in the November 2015 Paris attacks and the 2016 Brussels bombings is jailed for life for his involvement in the capture and murder of Jordanian pilot Moaz al-Kasasbeh, who was burned alive in a cage in Syria in 2015.

=== August ===
- 2 August – ISIS militants targeted the principal of a school in Al-Sha’fah, eastern Deir ez-Zor, Syria, killing him.
- 3 August:
  - The SDF, supported by the International Coalition, conducted a security operation in the city of Heseke, Syria, capturing a senior ISIS official responsible for the group's General Research Division which involves the identifying of targets for terrorist attacks.
  - ISIS militants attack on a checkpoint in the town of Dirinc in Deir ez-Zor, Syria, killing one civilian.
- 6 August – ISIS militants ambush and kill two SDF fighters in the town of Al-Bahra, in Deir ez-Zor, Syria.
- 9 August – TOL, with the support of the International Coalition, carried out a security operation against an ISIS cell in the city of al-Hol, south of Hesekê in the Cizîrê Canton, Syria, capturing two members of the group.
- 14 August – ISIS militants ambush four off duty SDF fighters in the town of Garanij, Deir ez-Zor, Syria, kill one and injuring the three others.
- 16 August – The Deir ez-Zor Military Council forces, in coordination with the Women's Protection Units (YPJ), conduct an operation in the town of Gharanij Deir ez-Zor, Syria, capturing 12 individuals with suspects linked to an ISIS sleeper cells in relation to an earlier attack. Four abducted SDF fighters where also freed during the operation.
- 19 August – CENTCOM forces, conducted a raid in Atimah, northern Syria, killing a senior ISIS member and key financier.
- 23 August – USAFRICOM forces, in coordination with the Federal Government of Somalia, concluded a two-week operation that included multiple airstrikes against ISIS militants in the Puntland region of Somalia targeting ISIS leadership in the Golis Mountains.
- 30 August – he Syrian Democratic Forces (SDF), the Internal Security Forces of North and East Syria, and the Women's Protection Units (YPJ) arrest51 ISIS members in the operation launched in Hesekê, Syria.
- 31 August:
  - Two ISIS militants are killed by the SDFs in a thwarted a suicide attack on their position in Raqqa, Syria.
  - USAFRICOM forces, in coordination with the Federal Government of Somalia, conducted airstrikes against ISIS militants in the vicinity of the Golis Mountains, approximately 50 km southeast of Bossaso, Somalia.

=== September ===
- 1 September – USAFRICOM forces, in coordination with the Federal Government of Somalia, conducted airstrikes against ISIS militants in the vicinity of the Golis Mountains, approximately 50 km southeast of Bossaso, Somalia.
- 2 September:
  - USAFRICOM forces, in coordination with the Federal Government of Somalia, conducted airstrikes against ISIS militants in the vicinity of the Golis Mountains, approximately 50 km southeast of Bossaso, Somalia.
  - Teams affiliated with the SDF, with the support of the International Coalition, captured Ahmed al-Mahmud from an ISIS sleeper cell in Raqqa, Syria.
- 4 September – Five ISIS militants are captured in Raqqa, Syria as a result of a joint operation by the Internal Security Forces and the SDF.
- 8 September:
  - 2025 Balçova police station shooting: An attack at the Salih Isgoren police station in the Balçova district of İzmir, Turkey leaves 3 police officers dead and two injured.
  - Ntoyo massacre: ISIL-affiliated Allied Democratic Force (ADF-Buluku) rebels attacked a wake in Ntoyo, Bapere sector, Lubero territory in the North Kivu province, Democratic Republic of the Congo killing 71.
- 10 September – USAFRICOM forces, in coordination with the Federal Government of Somalia, conducted an airstrike against ISIS militants in the Golis Mountains in Puntland, in Northeastern Somalia.
- 13 September – The Internal Security Forces, in coordination with the Counterterrorism Units (HAT), carried out an operation against ISIS cells in Raqqa, Syria capturing 8 mercenaries.
- 19 September – CENTCOM forces, conducted a raid in Syria, killing a senior ISIS operative Omar Abdul Qader.
- 21 September – USAFRICOM forces, in coordination with the Federal Government of Somalia, conducted an airstrike against ISIS militants in the vicinity of the Golis Mountains, approximately 60 km southeast of Bossaso, Somalia.
- 26 September – USAFRICOM forces, in coordination with the Federal Government of Somalia, conducted an airstrike against ISIS militants in the vicinity of the Golis Mountains, approximately 60 km southeast of Bossaso, Somalia.

=== October ===
- 2 October:
  - Manchester synagogue attack: A 35-year-old British citizen drove a car into pedestrians before stabbing worshippers at the Heaton Park Hebrew Congregation, a synagogue in Higher Crumpsall during the Jewish holiday of Yom Kippur. Two people died and three where injured. The attacker himself called 999 and pledged allegiance to Islamic State.
  - ISIS militants opened fire on a SDF vehicle on the road to Ma’ayzilah village in Al-Raqqah, Syria, injuring two SDF fighters.
  - Nine ISIS militants are captured during an operation carried out the Anti-Terror Forces (HAT), affiliated with the Internal Security Forces in the east of Deir ez-Zor, Syria.
- 3 October – USAFRICOM forces, in coordination with the Federal Government of Somalia, conducted an airstrike against ISIS militants in the vicinity of the Golis Mountains, approximately 60 km southeast of Bossaso, Somalia.
- 5 October – 71 people are arrested by SDF forces and Internal Security Forces in a joint security campaign against ISIS cells and criminal gangs in the countryside of Ain Issa, Syria.
- 6 October – Seventeen ISIS members are hand over to South Africa by the Autonomous Administration's Foreign Relations Department in Qamishlo, Syria, following talks on 25 September 2025.
- 11 October – USAFRICOM forces, in coordination with the Federal Government of Somalia, conducted an airstrike against ISIS militants in the vicinity of the Golis Mountains, approximately 85 km southeast of Bossaso, Somalia.
- 16 October – The SDF arrest three ISIS militants in Deir ez-Zor, Syria.
- 20 October:
  - USAFRICOM forces, in coordination with the Federal Government of Somalia, conducted an airstrike against ISIS militants in the vicinity of the Golis Mountains, approximately 85 km southeast of Bossaso, Somalia.
  - One SDF fighter is killed and three others were wounded in an ISIS IED attack on Muheimida Bridge along the Kharafi Road in western Deir Ezzor countryside, Syria.
- 21 October:
  - An ISIS IED kills two SDF fighters and injures three other in the village of Al-Hisan, in the Al-Kasra area, Deir ez-Zor, Syria after it detonates under their vehicle.
  - The military operations teams (TOL) of the SDF, with support from the International Coalition force, arrest an ISIS leader responsible for receiving and distributing weapons and military equipment to terrorist cells in Tabqa city and the surrounding area, as well as monitoring SDF forces’ military checkpoints.
- 23 October – The SDF, with support from the International Coalition force, arrest an ISIS leader east of Aleppo, Syria.
- 24 October – USAFRICOM forces, in coordination with the Federal Government of Somalia, conducted an airstrike against ISIS militants in the vicinity of the Golis Mountains, approximately 85 km southeast of Bossaso, Somalia.
- 26 October – USAFRICOM forces, in coordination with the Federal Government of Somalia, conducted an airstrike against ISIS militants in the vicinity of the Golis Mountains, approximately 85 km southeast of Bossaso, Somalia.
- 27 October – USAFRICOM forces, in coordination with the Federal Government of Somalia, conducted an airstrike against ISIS militants in the vicinity of the Golis Mountains, approximately 85 km southeast of Bossaso, Somalia.
- 28 October – USAFRICOM forces, in coordination with the Federal Government of Somalia, conducted an airstrike against ISIS militants in the vicinity of the Golis Mountains, approximately 85 km southeast of Bossaso, Somalia.

=== November ===
- 1 November – The SDF launched a security operation in Raqqa, Syria, against an ISIS sleeper cells arresting five mercenaries.
- 2 November – ISIS militants attack a SDF checkpoint in the town of Abu Hamam, Deir ez-Zor, Syria. No casualties were reported.
- 3 November – ISIS militants attack the home of a Transportation Authority official of the Autonomous Administration of North and East Syria in the town of Cedidet Igêdat, Deir ez-Zor, Syria
- 4 November:
  - Lafarge scandal: French Cement maker Lafarge goes on trial in France for paying the Islamic State, al-Nusra Front and other jihadists to keep its operations running in Syria, during the Syrian civil war between 2013 and 2014. The French firm had earlier pleaded guilty in the United States to complicity in crimes against humanity for providing material support to terrorists and was ordered to pay a $778 million fine in 2022.
  - ISIS militants attack a SDF military post in the town of Ziba, Deir ez-Zor, Syria with RPGs.
- 7 November:
  - The SDF launched an Internal Security Forces operation in the Deir ez-Zor, Syria arresting three ISIS members.
  - ISIS militants attacked a petrol tanker near the Ezbe oil field north of Deir ez-Zor, Syria.
- 8 November:
  - USAFRICOM forces, in coordination with the Federal Government of Somalia, conducted an airstrike against ISIS militants in the vicinity of the Shikaalo Valley, approximately 65 km southeast of Bossaso, Somalia.
  - ISIS militants detonate an IED during a SDF patrol on the road to the city of El-Susê in eastern Deir ez-Zor, Syria.
- 10 November – USAFRICOM forces, in coordination with the Federal Government of Somalia, conducted an airstrike against ISIS militants in the vicinity of the Golgol Cave, approximately 32 km southeast of Bossaso, Somalia.
- 13 November – ISIS militants attacked a petrol tanker in the town of El-Tekihi, north of Deir ez-Zor, Syria.
- 16 November:
  - ISIS militants attack Baghouz Co-Mayor Ehmed El-Tuma in Syria.
  - ISIS militants kill a member of the Internal Security Forces on the road between the towns of Muheymidê and El Meamil in Deir ez-Zor, Syria.
  - The Internal Security Forces headquarters in the town of Ziban, Syria, is attacked by ISIS militants.
- 18 November:
  - USAFRICOM forces, in coordination with the Federal Government of Somalia, conducted airstrikes against ISIS militants in the vicinity of the Golis Mountains, approximately 65 km southeast of Bossaso, Somalia.
  - A firefight occurs between ISIS militants and Internal Security Forces in El-Bisêra, Deir ez-Zor, Syria.
- 19 November – USAFRICOM forces, in coordination with the Federal Government of Somalia, conducted airstrikes against ISIS militants in the vicinity of the Golis Mountains, approximately 60 km southeast of Bossaso, Somalia.
- 20 November – The SDF shoots down two ISIS drones launched from positions held by Damascus government-affiliated factions along the Ghanem al-Ali front in eastern Raqqa countryside, Syria. The drone attack follows a week of fighting in the area between the SDF and ISIS militants.
- 21 November:
  - USAFRICOM forces, in coordination with the Federal Government of Somalia, conducted an airstrike against ISIS militants in the vicinity of the Golis Mountains, approximately 65 km southeast of Bossaso, Somalia.
  - ISIS militants attack a SDF positions around the town of Shusa, Syria.
  - ISIS militants launch a grenade attack on a SDF position in the town of Ziban, east of Deir ez-Zor, Syria.
  - ISIS militants attack an Internal Security Forces checkpoint in the town of Ebreyha, Syria.
- 22 November – USAFRICOM forces, in coordination with the Federal Government of Somalia, conducted an airstrike against ISIS militants in the vicinity of the Golis Mountains, approximately 65 km southeast of Bossaso, Somalia.
- 24 November
  - ISIS militants attack an SDF vehicle in the town of Cedidet Igêdar, Syria injuring one SDF fighter.
  - ISIS militants attack an SDF vehicle near the El Cefra oil field.
- 25 November – USAFRICOM forces, in coordination with the Federal Government of Somalia, conducted an airstrike against ISIS militants in the vicinity of the Golis Mountains, approximately 66 km southeast of Bossaso, Somalia
- 28 November – A failed rocket attack by ISIS militants on SDF vehicles in the town of Mehmida, Deir ez-Zor, Syria.

=== December ===
- 1 December – USAFRICOM forces, in coordination with the Federal Government of Somalia, conducted airstrikes against ISIS militants in the vicinity of the Golis Mountains, approximately 60 km southeast of Bossaso, Somalia.
- 2 December – USAFRICOM forces, in coordination with the Federal Government of Somalia, conducted airstrikes against ISIS militants in the vicinity of the Golis Mountains, approximately 60 km southeast of Bossaso, Somalia.
- 3 December – USAFRICOM forces, in coordination with the Federal Government of Somalia, conducted airstrikes against ISIS militants in the vicinity of the Golis Mountains, approximately 60 km southeast of Bossaso, Somalia.
- 13 December:
  - 2025 Palmyra attack: According to The Pentagon and Syrian officials, two U.S. soldiers and one civilian interpreter were killed and three American military personnel and two members of Syrian security forces were injured in Palmyra in an ambush involving a gunman belonging to ISIS.
  - Six ISIS militants attack an SDF military unit near the village of al-Takihi near Busayrah in Deir ez-Zor, Syria. The SDF suffered no caustites or injuries and killed one of the attackers and another while repelling the attack.
- 14 December – 2025 Bondi Beach shooting: Two ISIS inspire gunmen fire upon approximately one thousand people at a Hanukkah celebration at Bondi Beach in Sydney, Australia. A total of 16 people were killed, including a ten-year-old child and 40 people were injured.
- 15 December – USAFRICOM forces, in coordination with the Federal Government of Somalia, conducted airstrikes against ISIS militants in the vicinity of the Golis Mountains, approximately 70 km southeast of Bossaso, Somalia.
- 16 December – USAFRICOM forces, in coordination with the Federal Government of Somalia, conducted airstrikes against ISIS militants in the vicinity of the Golis Mountains, approximately 70 km southeast of Bossaso, Somalia.
- 17 December – Six ISIS members are arrested in operations conducted in Kirkuk, Nineveh, and Baghdad, by the Iraqi Counter-Terrorism Unit in coordination with the security forces of the Kurdistan Region.
- 19 December:
  - USAFRICOM forces, in coordination with the Federal Government of Somalia, conducted airstrikes against ISIS militants in the vicinity of the Golis Mountains, approximately 45 km southeast of Bossaso, Somalia.
  - CENTCOM forces and partner forces (including the Jordanian Armed Forces) commenced Operation Hawkeye Strike targeting ISIS sites across Syria in response to the 2025 Palmyra attack. CENTCOM forces struck more than 70 targets at multiple locations across Syria with fighter jets, attack helicopters, and artillery. The operation conducted more than 100 airstrikes.
  - A French court sentences a French woman who was repatriated from Syria in 2022 to 10 years in prison for terrorist conspiracy after joining ISIS in Syria. Another 60 women are yet to be tried for similar charges.
- 22 December – USAFRICOM forces, in coordination with the Federal Government of Somalia, conducted an airstrike against ISIS militants in the vicinity of the Golis Mountains, approximately 88 km southeast of Bossaso, Somalia.
- 23 December – USAFRICOM forces, in coordination with the Federal Government of Somalia, conducted airstrikes against ISIS militants in the vicinity of the Golis Mountains, approximately 90 km southeast of Bossaso, Somalia.
- 24 December – USAFRICOM forces, in coordination with the Federal Government of Somalia, conducted airstrikes against ISIS militants in the vicinity of the Golis Mountains, approximately 90 km southeast of Bossaso, Somalia.
- 25 December:
  - USAFRICOM forces, in coordination with the Federal Government of Somalia, conducted an airstrike against ISIS militants in the vicinity of the Golis Mountains, approximately 90 km southeast of Bossaso, Somalia.
  - Istanbul's prosecutor general ordered the arrest of 137 alleged Islamic State members, of whom 115 had been detained for planning attacks during Christmas, in Turkey.
  - 2025 United States strikes in Nigeria: USAFRICOM forces, in coordination with Nigerian authorities, conducted a series of airstrike against ISIS militants in Sokoto State, Nigeria.
- 27 December – Three ISIS members were arrested in operations carried out in different regions of Iraq according to the Iraqi Military Intelligence Directorate.
- 29 December – Six ISIL fighters have been killed in a shootout in Elmali district in Yalova Province, Turkey with police. The shootout also left three police officers dead.
- 30 December – Turkey detains 357 alleged Islamic State suspects across 21 provinces in nationwide raids.
- 31 December – Turkey arrests 125 alleged Islamic State suspects in nationwide raids.
