= Bankilare =

Bankilaré Bankilare, Bankilary
- Commune
- Location in Niger
- Coordinates: 14°35′N 0°44′E
- Country: Niger
- Region: Tillabéri Region
- Department: Téra Department
- Rural Commune: Bankilaré Commune

Area
  - Commune: 1,433 km^{2} (553 sq mi)
- Elevation: 277 m (909 ft)

Population (2012 census)
  - Commune: 84,893
  - Density: 59.24/km^{2} (153.4/sq mi)
  - Urban: 3,951
- Time zone: UTC+1 (WAT)

Bankilaré (var. Bankilare, Bankilary) is a village and rural commune in Niger. Bankilaré commune, centered on the town of the same name, is in Téra Department, Tillabéri Region, in the northwestern corner of the country. The town lies 60 km north of Departmental capital Téra, and around the same distance from the Burkina Faso border (to the west) and the Mali border (to the north). As of 2012, it had a population of 84,893.

== Demography ==
Bankilaré town had an estimated sedentary population of 4,000 in the year 2012, mainly ethnically Tuareg and related Tuareg related groups The major Tuareg group centered on Bankilaré are the "Tenguereguedesh" or "Tinguereguedech", a Uladen Aulliminden sub group, formerly a sedentary group bonded to the noble Kel Igirer Aulliminden. The name "Tinguereguedech" is derived from the Tamasheq language phrase meaning "I am under the protection of..." Smaller local nomadic populations also include the Loghmatten and Doufrafrak former bonded sub groups of the Kel Ansongo Tuareg, and the Fula Gaobé. The Gaobé historically practice a combination of rain-fed seasonal farming and semi-nomadic cattle raising.

Other local sedentary ethnic groups include the Songhai - Djerma peoples, and Gourmantche. The concentration of Tuareg population here sets the commune apart for the rest of the department, with the area north of Niamey and east of the river a largely Songhay "cultural zone". The rural areas immediately around the town are seasonally home to at least 10,000 nomadic Tuareg, who take their animals to pastures far north and east of here during the rainy season (roughly June to September).

Large portions of the local Tuareg population were historically slave or other bonded classes. One 2005 study found "practices related to slavery still exist among the Tuareg in Bankilaré" who continue to form "an endogamous group with special rights and obligations but without denying this group a Tuareg identity". Many from this community make seasonal migrations for seasonal labor to the Abidjan area, mirroring nomadic tuareg migrations north.

== Economy ==
Bankilaré's economy is based around pastoral livestock, local subsistence farming, and services to these populations. Bankilaré is also known for its large market, where nomadic and sedentary groups buy and sell goods.

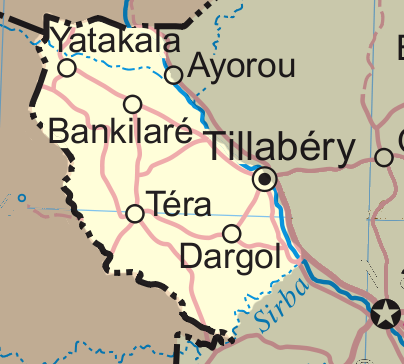
Téra Department

== Communications center ==
Because Bankilaré is a dry season transhumance center for Tuareg groups which range as far north as Algeria, in 1999 the town was chosen to pilot what became a very successful radio project in which locals would broadcast pasturage conditions to desert populations across the region. Because of this it has since become the site of several Nigerien government and foreign radio and internet based community communication programs.

== Drought and food scarcity ==
Bankilaré commune was particularly hard hit by the 1983-5 drought and famine which struck the region and faced notable food insecurity again in the late 1990s and 2005.

== Governance ==
Bankilaré's importance as a pole for nomadic populations is reflected in the history of local governance. Prior to independence Bankilaré's administration was overseen by a series of "Tuareg specialists" within the French colonial service, notably Michel de Geyer d'Orth, who was "chef de poste" at Bankilaré from 1957, after serving in the northern Tuareg communities of Agadez and Iferouane. The French implemented a governance policy, while based in a single town, which governed nomadic groups (called "Fractions") wherever they traveled over the course of migrations. This model was implemented in 27 "Administrative Posts", including Bankliare, from the founding of the Republic of Niger (as a devolved authority from France) in 1959 and independence in 1960. After this local authority was centralized back to the departmental level, the Administrative Post and "fraction" model was re-implemented in part during the decentralization process of the late 1990s that created the Bankilaré commune.

Bankilaré's ethnic differences from nearby towns are echoed in its relations with local "customary leaders" (pre-colonial leaders who now hold limited political roles) and its devolution from local political authority. Bankilaré is bordered by the Songhay majority towns of Yatakala, Gorouol, and Diagourou. This has meant that at times, Bankilaré is an ethnic enclave within Songhay majority local authorities, for long periods governed under a now defunct "Gorouol Canton". In 1992, Bankilaré was in fact made an official "Minority group" area by the Nigerien government. Since the 1990s Tuareg rebellion and the 1995-2002 decentralization process, Bankilaré Commune's distinct status has been reinforced by the structures of local government.
