= Liptako =

Historic region of West Africa

Coordinates: 17.20466°N 2.413394°W

Liptako is an historic region of West Africa. It today falls in eastern Burkina Faso, southwestern Niger and a small portion of southeast central Mali. A hilly region beginning on the right back of the Niger river, Liptako is usually associated with the Liptako Emirate, an early 19th-century Fulani Islamic state, founded by Brahima Saidu. A modern remnant of the emirate continues to exist as a non-sovereign monarchy. The current emir, Ousmane Amirou Dicko, lives in Dori.

With the semi nomadic Fula, the main historic population of Liptako are the Gourmantche, a minority population in each of the three nations, as well as the Mossi and Songhai. The other common name for the region, Liptako–Gourma, is a reference to the Gourmantche people.

Modern Liptako, most of which falls in 10 to 19 provinces of Burkina Faso, along with Niger's Tera Department and Say Department, and small parts of Mali, is a hilly and in parts sparsely populated area. As elsewhere, the Fula population, known as the "Liptaako" or Liptako Fula, are historically supported by semi-nomadic cattle raising and trade. Say, a nearby Niger River trade center, regionally dominant in the 19th century, relied in part on Fula trade routes through Liptako. In the late 20th century, gold and other minerals were discovered here, leading to the 1970 creation of the Liptako–Gourma Authority: a regional zone focused on the promotion of the area's mineral, energy, hydraulic, and agricultural resources. The zone covered by the authority covers an area of 370,000 km^{2}, broader than the historic Liptako, including 19 provinces of Burkina Faso, 4 administrative regions of Mali, and two Regions and an urban community of Niger. Major towns in Liptako include Diagourou, Téra in Niger, and Dori, Koala and Aribinda in Burkina Faso.

== See also ==
- Liptako–Gourma Authority
- List of rulers of Liptako
- Tera Department, Niger
- Samira Hill Gold Mine: large Nigerien Gold Mine along the Burkina Faso border
