= Djibo Yacouba =

Nigerien politician and diplomat (1923–1968)

Personal details
- Born: February 28, 1923 Téra, Niger
- Died: August 4, 1968 (aged 45) Niamey, Niger
- Spouse: Fatou Djibo (m. 1946)
- Occupation: Politician, Diplomat

Djibo Yacouba (February 28, 1923 – August 4, 1968) was a Nigerien politician and diplomat.

== Early life and career ==
Djibo Yacouba attended school first in Téra, his hometown, and later in Niamey, where he attended the Regional School and then the Higher Primary School. The need to further his education led him to Dakar, where he attended the École normale William-Ponty from 1940 to 1943, specializing in teaching. Exempted from military service, he worked as an assistant teacher and was assigned as an administrator at the Professional School and the Normal Course in Niamey. After Niamey, he taught in other cities in Niger. Among his extracurricular activities, theater holds a prominent place. He, along with Mahamane Dan Dobi, Souleymane Ly, and Zada Niandou, significantly influenced the theatrical life in urban centers of Niger in the 1940s and 1950s. He wrote a play titled Le Marché noir which addressed the issues of urban life in Africa. These years were also marked by his intense involvement in politics, particularly the independence struggles.

== Political career ==
In 1956, Djibo Yacouba entered politics, starting as a municipal councilor and territorial councilor. He was later elected as a deputy of the Nigerien Progressive Party (PPN-RDA) first to the Territorial Assembly and then to the National Assembly. When the first government was formed in 1958, President Hamani Diori appointed him as Minister of Livestock and Animal Industries. In the following years, he held the positions of Minister of Rural Economy and Minister of Defense, Information, and Youth. In November 1966, he was appointed ambassador to Belgium and representative to the European Economic Community (EEC) in Brussels. He died in a car accident while on a mission in Niamey in August 1968, leaving behind a widow, Fatou Djibo, a teacher and women's rights activist, and 8 children. The street where the accident occurred was named after him, but following a regime change in 1975, it was renamed.
