= Timeline of the Iraqi insurgency (2025) =

This is a timeline of events during the Islamic State insurgency in Iraq (2017–present) in 2025.

== Chronology ==
=== January ===
- In January 2025: 7 Iraqi Security Personnel, 1 Coalition Soldier, 1 civilian and 31 ISIS militants were killed.

=== February ===
- In February 2025: 1 Iraqi Security Personnel was injured, while 8 civilians and 7 ISIS militants were killed.

=== March ===
- In March 2025 Iraq announces that a senior leader of the Islamic State in Iraq and Syria was killed in the Al Anbar Governorate during a joint operation between Iraqi security forces and the United States.

=== April ===
- 2025 Duhok axe attack: On 1 April 2025, a Syrian national went on a short-lived spree of attacks against Assyrians celebrating the annual Kha b-Nisan festival in Duhok. Two people are confirmed to have been injured from the attacks, while other sources suggest that an additional third person was from the Asayish was injured. A source close to Iraqi Shafaq News stated that the attacker had conducted the attack as a terrorist operation linked to IS, but investigations have so far failed to uncover a specific motive.

=== June ===
- 29 June: Three ISIS commanders were killed in an operation by Iraqi Security Forces in Balkana mountain range along Saladin and Kirkuk provinces.

=== October ===
- 9 October: Three ISIS militants were killed in an airstrike by Iraqi Airforce in Kirkuk.

== See also ==
- Timeline of the Islamic State (2025)
