= Téra Department =

Coordinates: 14°00′38″N 0°45′11″E

Téra
- Department
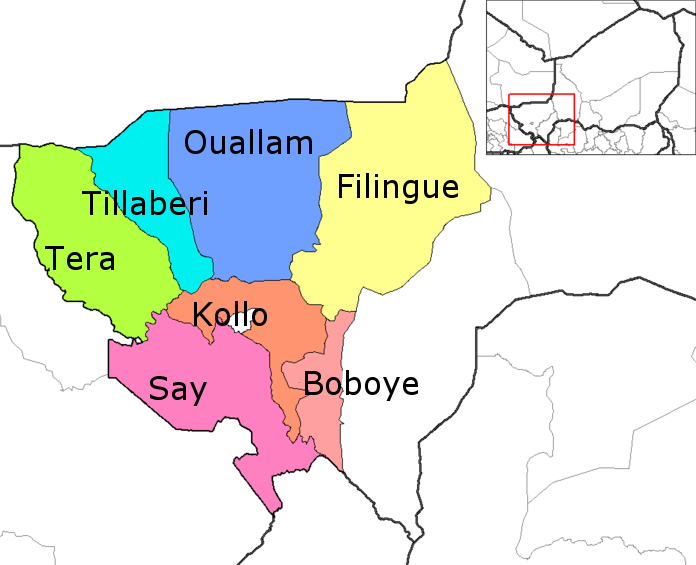
- Tera Department location in the region
- Country: Niger
- Region: Tillabéri Region

Area
  - Total: 15,794 km^{2} (6,098 sq mi)

Population (2011)
  - Total: 579,658
- Time zone: UTC+1 (GMT 1)

Téra is a department of the Tillabéri Region in Niger. Its capital is the city of Téra. As of 2011, the department had a total population of 579,658 people.

== History ==
Téra Department covers most of the historic territory of Liptako. Today it is primarily a home to speakers of Songhay Cine, a Southern Songhai language. Prior to the Songhai Empire, the area was populated by Gourmantche and Mossi peoples. By the 16th century Téra was one of the many small states which survived the destruction of the Songhai Empire, with many Songhai communities resettling into what is today Niger from the north. The Dendi Songhai state of the 17th century ruled the area, before dividing into several small states, each ruled by an Askia of Songhai noble lineage. In the late 19th century, the Songhai city state around Téra was in almost continual conflict with Tuareg groups in the north and east, with the city of Téra sacked and destroyed as late as 1885. Forces from Usman dan Fodio's Sokoto Caliphate took the area several times in the early 19th century as well, but were pushed back by Djerma forces in the regions to the southeast, though semi-nomadic Fula communities were present in the area from at least the 18th century.

== Population ==
With a majority of Songhay-Djerma peoples, large Fula, Gourmantche and Tuareg populations live in the area as well. Téra is one of the few places where the Songhoyboro Ciine dialect is still spoken, although the people are more likely to call themselves (and their language) "Songhay" or "Zarma".

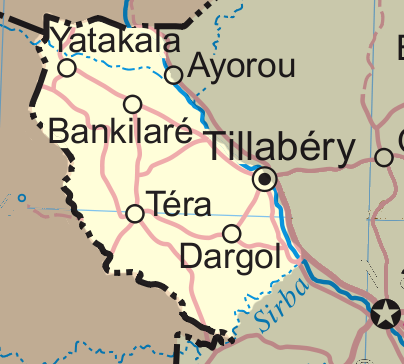
Téra Department

== Geography ==
The Téra department slopes down to the east, bordered by the Niger River. To the west, the area has laterite plateaus broken by occasional mesas. Téra Department lies entirely within the Sahel region, and receives between 400mm-500mm of rain a year. The vegetation is sparse, with dry scrub forests and grasses, except in the land along the Niger, which is lush with wild vegetation as well as vegetable and fruit gardens. In the northern section of the department, the Niger forms a broad channel, where hippopotamus and other wildlife are still common.

The Kokoro and Namga Wetlands in Tera Department was designated a Ramsar site in 2001. Covering 668km2, the wetland hosts migratory birdlife and is important to the local ecology.

The Departmental seat, a town of almost 20,000, lies on a tributary of the Niger, dammed to provide a small lake. Its main tarred road—the RN4—passes south from Tera to Diagourou (a Fula town 15 km away), Dargol and Gotheye, crossing the Niger at Bac Farie by ferry. The RN1 road continues to Niamey, 180 km from Tera. To the north of the department lie the small towns of Yatakala, Labezanga (where the Niger crosses to Mali), Bankilare (a mainly Tuareg town) and Kokoro in the center of the department. The cities of Ayorou and Tillaberi lie just across the Niger in Tillaberi Department to the east.

The department is bordered to the south by Say Department and Kollo Department, along the course of the Sirba River, a seasonal tributary of the Niger.

== Economy ==
Most of the population is engaged in agriculture, with Millet being the primary crop.

The area contains a major road connecting Niger with Dori Burkina Faso, making Tera a transport and trade hub. Tera also has an airport, a 3900 ft/1189m strip designated DRRE.

The Samira Hill Gold Mine (Namaga concession) began producing gold in 2004 from the Tera greenstone belt which surrounds Koma Bangou, the country's largest artisanal mining site. The mine is operated by SML (Societe des Mines du Liptako), a joint venture between Moroccan SEMAFO Inc and Canadian ETRUSCAN, along with a Nigerien 20% stake.

The traditional and distinctive Tera-Tera fabric is produced by Djerma artisans in Tera. Strips of striped, dyed handloomed fabric are sewn into larger blankets and are used in traditional marriage ceremonies and exported abroad.

== Contested international border ==
Prior to 1910, portions of what are now Ansongo Mali were administered from Tera, while prior to 1922, Dori in modern Burkina Faso was administered from Tera, as part of the Niger colonial military territory of French West Africa. When the French divided French Upper Volta colony between its neighbors in 1932, the districts of Fada and most of Dori (excluding the canton of Aribinda) were added to Niger, most in the (then) Cercle of Tera. Upper Volta was reconstituted in 1946, but the Tera Cercle's boundary remained a source of dispute until the Niger-Upper Volta protocol of agreement on their common boundary was signed at Niamey on June 23, 1964, fixing the present western border of the Tera administrative entity.
