= UFN =

UFN is an acronym for:

- UFC Ultimate Fight Night, a mixed martial arts event held by Ultimate Fight Championship company
- Uspekhi Fizicheskikh Nauk ((Russian: Успехи физических наук), a Russian academical publication of Physics
- Ucluelet First Nation, the treaty government of the Yuułuʔiłʔatḥ in the Canadian province of British Columbia
- "United Federation of Nations", an episode of Code Geass: Lelouch of the Rebellion R2
- Union des Femmes du Niger, a women's organisation in Niger, active from 1959 to 1974
