= Fambita =

- Location within Niger
- Coordinates: 14°20′9″N 0°54′2″E
- Country: Niger
- Region: Tillabéri Region
- Department: Téra Department
- Commune: Kokorou

Population (2012)
  - Total: 302

Fambita (also: Fambéta, Fombita) is a village in the rural commune of Kokorou in Niger.

== Geography ==
The village, led by a traditional chief (chef traditionnel), is located approximately 14 kilometers north of the main town of Kokorou, in the rural commune of the same name, which belongs to the Téra department in the Tillabéri region. Other settlements in the vicinity of Fambita include Béra in the northwest, Amara and Loudji in the northeast, Dossa Kourégou in the southwest, and Doungouro and Sédey in the west.

The climate is that of the Sahel zone, with an average annual rainfall of between 300 and 400 mm.

== History ==
On May 15, 2023, armed attackers invaded the villages of Fambita, Béra, Doungouro, Firo Koira, Komdi, Kourégou, Sédey, and Zaney, extorting livestock. The previous day, livestock had been stolen and two people murdered in the village of Boungou, also located in the Kokorou commune. Residents of all the villages fled under difficult circumstances to the departmental capital, Téra.

In an attack attributed to the terrorist organization Islamic State in the Greater Sahara, 44 civilians were killed and 13 others injured, four seriously, during Friday prayers at a mosque in Fambita on March 21, 2025. As they retreated, the attackers set fire to the market and several residential buildings. The Niger government declared three days of national mourning following the massacre.

== Population ==
At the 2012 census, Fambita had a population of 302 living in 30 households. At the 2001 census, the population was 211 living in 32 households. At the 1988 census, the population was 2,219 living in 288 households.

Historical population
Year	Pop.	±%
1988	2,219	—
2001	211	−90.5%
2012	302	+43.1%

== Culture ==
According to traditional belief in the Songhai region, a pond near Fambita, like some bodies of water elsewhere, is inhabited by the spirit creature gorou gondi, which takes the form of a water snake. In Fambita, the snake is called Assibatali.

== Economy and infrastructure ==
A weekly market is held in the village. Market day is Friday. The village has a health centre, the Centre de Santé Intégré (CSI). There is a school for local children.
