= Téra =

- Commune
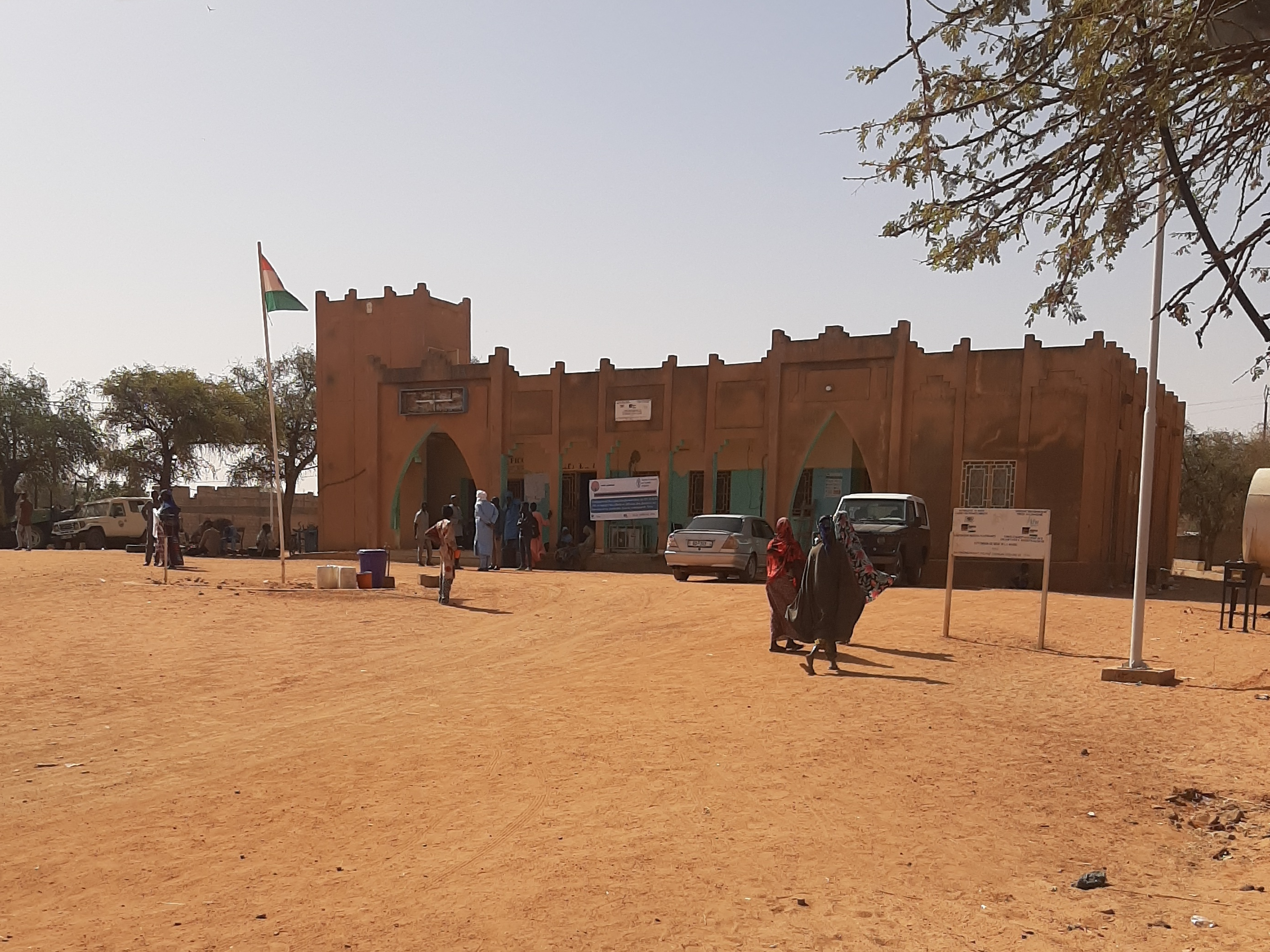
- Téra Town Hall

- Location in Niger
- Coordinates: 14°00′38″N 0°45′11″E
- Country: Niger
- Region: Tillabéri Region
- Department: Téra Department

Area
  - Commune: 2,071 km^{2} (800 sq mi)
- Elevation: 227 m (745 ft)

Population (2012 census)
  - Commune: 71,648
  - Density: 34.60/km^{2} (89.60/sq mi)
  - Urban: 29,119
  - Summer (DST): UTC+1 (WAT)

Téra is a city and capital of the Tera Department, in the Tillabéri Region of southwestern Niger. It is situated 175 km north-west of the capital Niamey, close to the border with Burkina Faso. It is mainly inhabited by Songhai, Fulani, Gourmantche and Bouzou ethnic groups. The majority of the population are farmers.

== History ==
The place name Téra comes from the Gourmanchéma language and means “frog”.

After the fall of the Songhai Empire in 1591, the area of what later became Téra was one of the places in today's Niger where Songhai refugees settled under a descendant of the former Askiya ruling dynasty. Abaza, son of Alazi, founded the independent state of Tougana here. Under Abaza's son Marounfa, Tougana was defeated by Gorouol. Marounfa's nephew Ama Kassa eventually founded Téra. The reigns of Ama Kassa's successors Ali Ama, Tienda and Gabélinga were marked by military conflicts with neighboring groups.

Around 1839, Téra and Kokorou were attacked by Silanké, a subgroup of the Fulani who came from Dori in Liptako. Téra called Tuareg from the left bank of the Niger for help. The Silanké, allied with other Fulani groups and Kurtey, were defeated in two battles. However, Téra could not get rid of the Tuareg, who caused insecurity in the area around the city. A new war soon broke out: Téra, still in alliance with the Tuareg and the Mossi of Diagourou, lost to Liptako, which took around 2,000 prisoners from Téra. The Tuareg and Mossi soon turned against Téra and drove out the ruler Gabélinga after murdering his nephew Sidi. Gabélinga was able to regain power in Téra one last time in 1878, but was murdered in 1885.

In 1899, Téra came under French military administration as part of the newly created Sinder district (cercle de Sinder). The place was annexed to the new military territory of Niger in 1905. The French set up the first school in town in 1917.

The Dakar Rally passed through Téra in 1986. In 1988, Téra, along with nine other Nigerien towns, received the status of an independent municipality.

== Geography ==
Téra is the capital of the Téra department of the same name, which belongs to the Tillabéri region. The municipality is located on the Dargol, a tributary of the Niger River. It borders the neighboring state of Burkina Faso to the west. The neighboring communities in Niger are Bankilaré in the north, Dargol and Kokorou in the east and Diagourou in the south. The northern half of the municipality of Téra is included in the Sahel, while the southern half is part of the transition zone between the Sahel and Sudan regions. The municipality consists of an urban and a rural area.

=== Climate ===
Téra has a dry desert climate. The temperature is between 18 °C and 30 °C from November to February and between 36 °C and 44 °C from March to April. Annual rainfall varies from 250 mm to 400 mm.

== Demographics ==
In the 2012 census, the municipality had 71,201 inhabitants living in 9157 households. Around 30,000 people lived in the urban area. The municipality is a settlement area of the Songhai, Tuareg and Mossi.

Census	Population
2001	67,996
2012	71,648

== Economy ==
Thursday is market day in Téra. Animals – mainly cattle, goats, sheep and domestic birds – are traded by farmers from all corners of the Department. A 2009 US report stated that the Téra and Tillabery regions in Western Niger "are two of the most food-insecure areas of the country".

== Transport ==
The city is served by a small airport to the south at 13.95000°N 0.73300°E.

== Notable people ==
- Fatou Djibo – educator, feminist and trade unionist

== Gallery ==
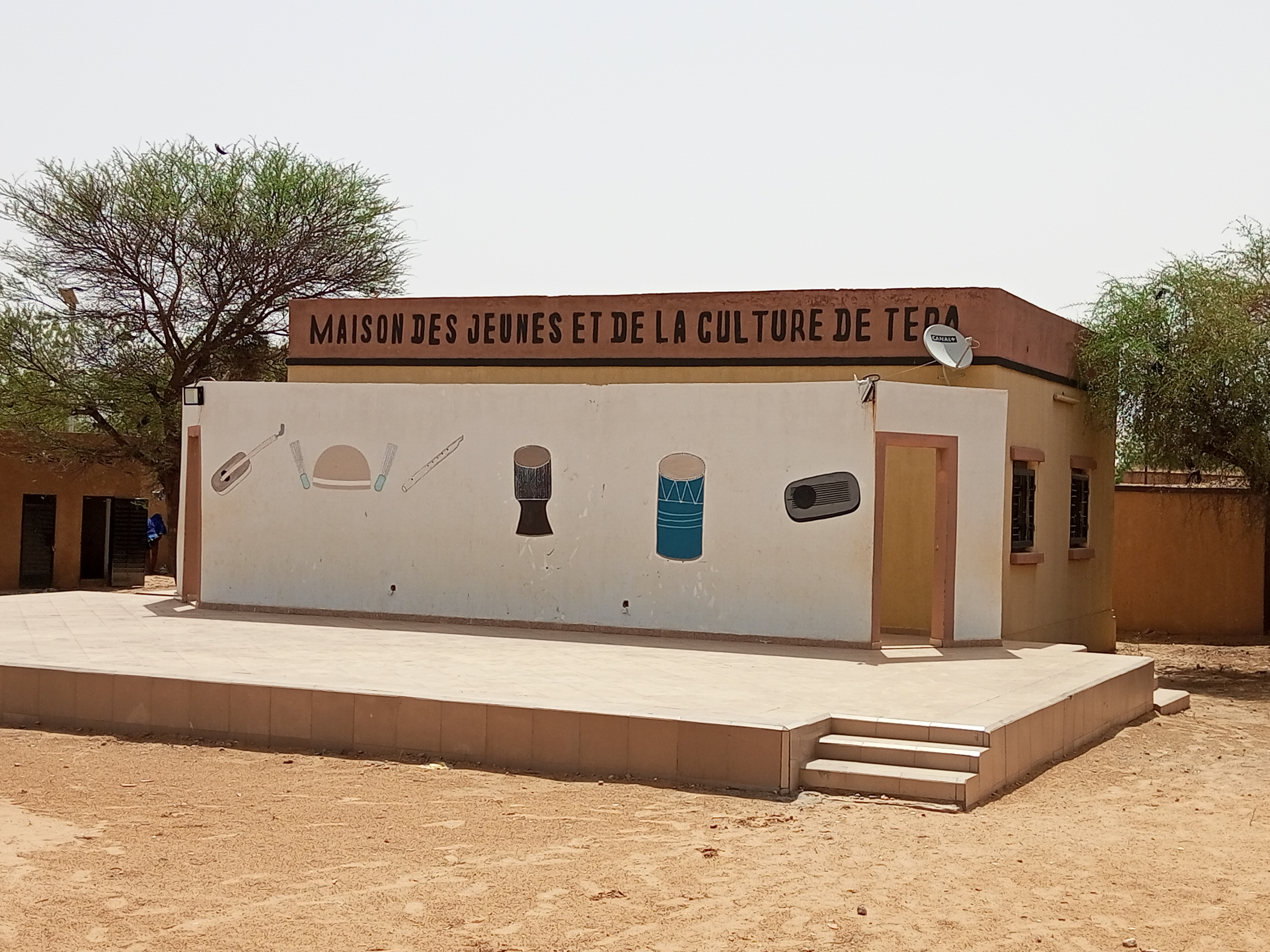
House of Youth and Culture

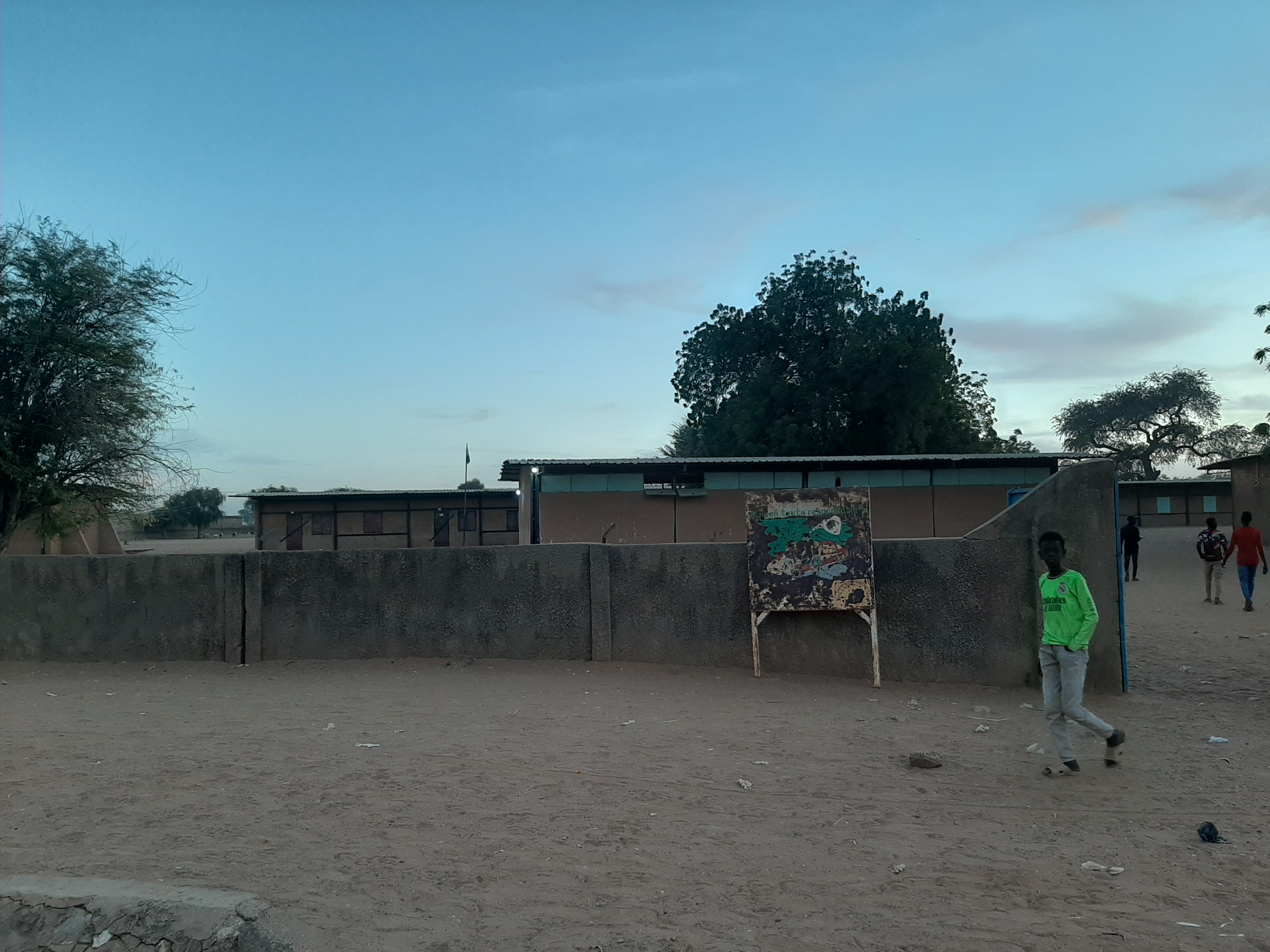
Amadou Soumaila School
