= B̀ =

Latin letter B with grave accent

B with grave
- B̀ b̀

Usage
- Writing system: Latin script

Other
- Writing direction: Left-to-Right

B with grave (majuscule: B̀, minuscule: b̀) is a letter of the Latin alphabet formed by addition of the grave accent over the letter B. It is used in Ntcham language spoken by Gurma people in Togo and Ghana.
