= Liptako–Gourma Authority =

African regional development organisation

- Autorité du Liptako-Gourma (French)
- Formation: 3 December 1970; 55 years ago
- Type: intergovernmental organization
- Headquarters: Ouagadougou
- Members: Burkina Faso; Mali; Niger
- Website: www.liptakogourma.org

The Liptako–Gourma Authority (Autorité du Liptako-Gourma (French), also known as ALG) is a regional organization seeking to develop the contiguous areas of Mali, Niger, and Burkina Faso.

Created in December 1970, the Liptako–Gourma Authority has as its goal the promotion of the area's mineral, energy, hydraulic, and agricultural resources within a regional framework. The zone covered by the authority corresponds to the border regions of the three countries, and covers an area of 370,000 km^{2}, including 19 provinces of Burkina Faso, 4 administrative regions of Mali, and two departments and an urban community of Niger.

This zone is composed entirely of the semi-arid Sahel region. The dominant economic activity is agriculture and livestock herding, but the zone has considerable energy, hydraulic, and mining potential.

== Joint military task force ==
On 24 January 2017, the three states agreed to form a joint task force to combat insecurity and terrorism in the region, to be headquartered in Niamey, with rotating leadership to represent all three nations. The task force was created as a subordinate unit of the multinational force of the G5 Sahel countries, which includes Mauritania and Chad as well as the three countries of the Liptako-Gourma Authority. The move was modeled on the establishment of a multi-national force in 2015 by Chad, Cameroon, Niger and Nigeria to oppose Boko Haram in the Lake Chad basin.

A mutual defense pact known as the Alliance of Sahel States was formed by the three states on 16 September 2023 during the 2023 Nigerien crisis to help against possible threats of armed rebellion or external aggression while ECOWAS threatens to intervene against the coup in Niger.

== See also ==
- Alliance of Sahel States
