= Fambita mosque attack =

Islamist terrorist attack in the Tillabéri Region of Niger

- Part of the jihadist insurgency in Niger
- Location: 14°20′7″N 0°54′5″E; Fambita, Kokorou, Tillabéri Region, Niger
- Date: 21 March 2025
- Deaths: 44
- Injuries: 20
- Perpetrator: Islamic State – Sahel Province (suspected)

On 21 March 2025, an armed assault targeted a mosque in the southwestern Niger town of Fambita, Kokorou, resulting in at least forty-four fatalities and thirteen injuries. The Nigerien government subsequently declared a three-day national mourning period. Security authorities attributed responsibility for the attack to the Islamic State – Sahel Province (ISSP).

== Attack ==
The attack occurred in the Fambita district of Kokorou, a rural community situated near Niger's southwestern border with Burkina Faso and Mali, which had been deemed a focal point of an Islamic State and al-Qaeda-linked jihadist insurgency. According to government statements, armed assailants surrounded the mosque during Ramadan prayer services in the early afternoon hours. The attackers randomly shot at worshippers. The Ministry of Interior characterized the attack as displaying "unusual cruelty" in its execution. Beyond the human casualties, perpetrators also set ablaze the local marketplace and several residential structures.

At least 44 people were killed. Twenty people were injured, with 13 people being severely injured and four people being critically injured.

== Responses ==
Following the attack, Niger's military government instituted a three-day national mourning period. While no group claimed responsibility, Government officials released formal statements through both Niger's Ministry of Interior and Ministry of Defense officially attributing responsibility to Islamic State – Sahel Province (ISSP), and issued public commitments to pursue the perpetrators and bring them to justice. Minister of the Interior Mohamed Toumba described the attack as a "cowardly and inhumane act". United Nations High Commissioner for Human Rights Volker Türk said that the attack violated international human rights law and humanitarian law.

== See also ==
- May 2020 Tillabéri massacres
- 2021 Adab-Dab attack
- Wiye and Deykoukou massacres
