= Route nationale 4 (Niger) =

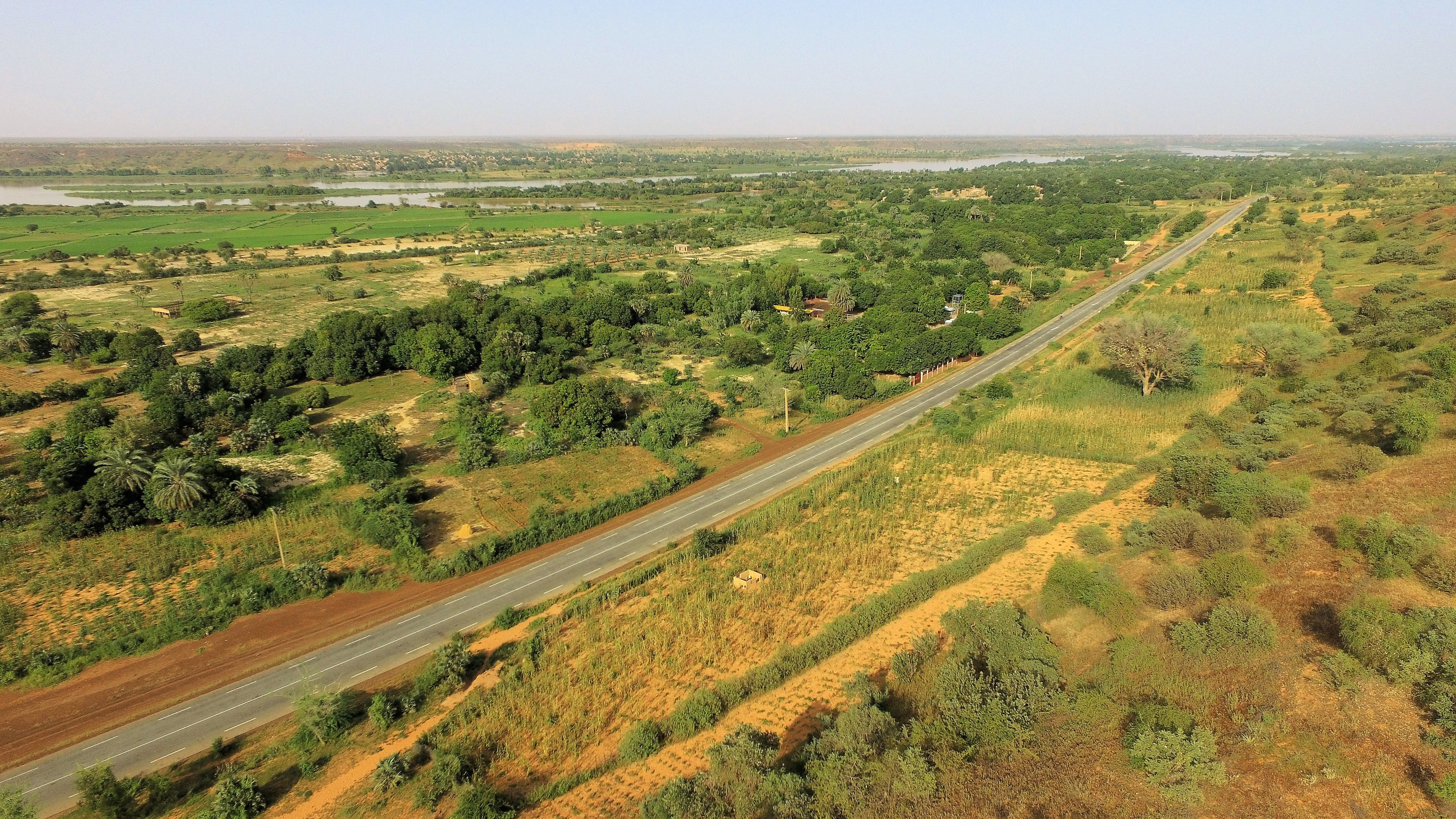
Route N4 near Sarando Béné

The Route Nationale No. 4 is an important highway in Niger. It connects Niamey to Téra.

== History ==
The road was resurfaced in 2021.

== See also ==
- Transport in Niger
