= Fatou Djibo =

Nigerien feminist

- Born: Fadima Hassane Diallo; April 27, 1927; Téra, Niger
- Died: April 6, 2016 (aged 88); Niamey, Niger
- Education: École normal de Rufisque
- Known for: President of Union des Femmes du Niger
- Spouse: Djibo Yacouba (m. 1946; died 1968)

Fatou Djibo (27 April 1927 - 6 April 2016) was a Nigerien women's rights activist, feminist, educator and trade unionist. She was President of the Union des Femmes du Niger and was also the first woman from Niger to drive a car.

== Biography ==
Born Fadima Hassane Diallo on 27 April 1927, Djibo's father was Chief Djagourou, a traditional ruler appointed by the French colonial administration to the district leader of Téra where she was born. In a step that was unusual at the time, he sent his daughter, when she was seven years old, to the newly opened primary school in Téra and as result was one of the first Nigerian girls to go to school. She continued her education at the higher elementary school in the capital Niamey and finally at the teacher training institute École normal de Rufisque in Senegal. She graduated with distinction in 1946. In the same year she married the teacher Djibo Yacouba with whom she had eight children.

From 1946 to 1966, Djibo worked as a primary school teacher, initially in Fada N'Gourma and later in Maradi, Zinder, Tillabéri and Niamey. In 1954 she was Niger's first woman driver. Djibo founded the women's organization Union des Femmes du Niger (UFN) on 7 March 1959, which she chaired for many years. In 1962 she led a delegation from the union to Cairo.

During the First Republic (1960–1974) she was the face of the public for the concerns of women in Niger. She argued that the development of a country cannot be complete without the emancipation of women and that the degradation and humiliation of women must be stopped by appropriate laws. At the same time she saw the primary task of the Nigerien woman as the educator of the citizens of the future. In 1969 Djibo followed her husband to Brussels when he was appointed ambassador. After his death in 1968 she returned to Niger, where she became treasurer of the Lycée Kassaï School in Niamey. In 1971, she was also deputy treasurer of the Union of Workers' Trade Unions of Niger. In 1978 she officially thanked the USSR for its gift of medicines and medical instruments to the Niger Red Cross. In 1979 she attended an international workshop on women and leadership.

Djibo retired in 1983 and continued to volunteer for trade unions, the Red Cross and other organizations. She died in Niamey on 6 April 2016.
