= Gorouol =

Coordinates: 13°30′N 1°01′E

Gorouol Goroual
- Commune and village
- Interactive map of Gorouol
- Country: Niger
- Region: Tillabéri
- Department: Téra

Area
  - Total: 1,327 sq mi (3,437 km^{2})

Population (2012 census)
  - Total: 66,276
  - Density: 49.94/sq mi (19.28/km^{2})
- Time zone: UTC+1 (WAT)

Gorouol is a village and rural commune in Niger. As of 2012, it had a population of 66,276.

On 18 January 2026, the villages was attacked by unidentified gunmen who killed 31 people and injured four others.
