= Niger gold mine collapse =

2021 disaster in Niger

The Niger gold mine collapse occurred on 7 November 2021 when a manually dug well collapsed at the Garin-Liman mining area of Maradi region, Niger. The day of the mine disaster left 18 people dead on the spot, 7 injured and hospitalised, and dozens of miners buried underground waiting to be rescued. However, equipment limitations have slowed the rescue process. On 9 November 2021, two days after the mine disaster, rescuers found more bodies in the collapsed mine. Eventually, the number of people killed in the accident rose to 32. Since the incident took place on the border between Niger and Nigeria, a large number of Nigerians work in the area. According to reports, among the victims, 13 were Nigerians.

However, due to the lack of relevant reports, the fatality rate of the accident and the cure rate of the injured who were sent to the hospital have not been presented. This poses difficulties in assessing the magnitude of the disaster.

== Background ==
=== Social background ===
Increasing demand for metals and rising prices have triggered a boom in small-scale mining in poor countries around the world in recent years. Such type of mining practice is common across much of West Africa, as well as in the Niger, one of the poorest countries in the world. There is in fact only one industrial-scale legal mine in the country, at Samira in the western region of Tillaberi, but illegal gold mining has always been a major economic activity in this poor landlocked country. Here security precautions are often negligible and collapse frequently. This lays a potential risk for security incidents to occur.

=== Related disasters ===
Although this gold mine was only discovered in the Garin-Liman area in August 2021, thousands of miners immediately gathered there. However, within just 3 months, this is already the second mine collapse in the Maradi region, with the previous incident resulting in at least 8 deaths. After the second accident the local government explicitly banned mining in this gold mine and initiated monitoring the area. However, miners continue to illegally extract gold. In February 2022, the implicated gold mine collapsed once again, resulting in 5 fatalities.

Timeline
Date	Event	Death toll
August 2021	Discovered gold mine	
Unknown	First collapse	$\geq$8
7 November 2021	Secondary collapse	32
1 February 2022	Tertiary collapse	5

=== Potential causes ===
The accident occurred at the mining site in the village of Garin-Liman. The area is characterized by loose soil that never holds up leading to the frequent min collapse in various mines. A survivor said the mining holes were carved wrongly. "The place that can accommodate 10 to 15 mining holes have more than 150 to 200 mining holes. It is not supposed to be so, and this might be the main cause of the collapse." According to Adamou Guero, the mayor of Dan Issa, "artisanal miners often use old-fashioned and unregulated digging methods, leading to frequent deadly accidents". This may also have contributed to the accident.

Maradi in southern Niger near the border with Nigeria, where the accident happened

== Geographical and physical impact ==
Niger is a country rich on hard commodities like gold, with such exports accounting for approximately 40% of the total exports, resulting in $1.2 Billion revenue for the country. Therefore, it is evident that the demand for gold mines is high. Nevertheless, Niger sits located in Northern Central Africa with a desert-like climate and soil that is predominantly made of sand, hence mining is made difficult due to the fact that the ground is not stable enough to support deep excavations. Unfortunately, negligence in this regard is one of the reasons the Niger Gold Mine collapsed in 2021, killing a total of 32 as a consequence.

The Maradi Region is an impoverished part of Niger with a population that exceeds 3 million. With its lack of diversified economy, the local population has only a few career options, and one of them includes working in mines. Many have to travel to the mining sites in pursue of the income that will provide their family with the much-needed food and shelter. Therefore, it is normally those in need, the workers, that suffer the consequences of mines collapsing and the loss of lives across many African countries on a frequent basis.

Niger’s government’s ambitions include an increase in the mining industry to a scale that it has never seen before. Furthermore, this tends to be a trend across many poor African countries. This can bring divided opinions on how beneficial it could be for the people living in these countries. On one side, job opportunities are scarce, and the majority of the population do not have a stable income. Opportunities in mining provide one of the few options for locals to be employed and provide for their families, therefore, the more mines are present, the more people can afford to live a more comfortable life. Nevertheless, the mining industry and job stability it provides, comes at an expense. Locals have to relocate away from their families for prolonged period of times. Furthermore, collapses result in loss of life. Soil instability and outdated methods in all these mines are the reason behind the frequent collapses in the region.

Ultimately, the increase in prevalence of mines in Africa can have positive outcomes for the country and its people. Nevertheless, health & safety is a concern. Niger should proactively seek to enhance the methods used in mining which will eventually lead to a safer work environment.

== National and International disaster response ==
=== Local Response ===
The immediate local response to the gold mine collapse outside the Garin-Liman village had been characterised by the efforts of rescue workers and local volunteers who, equipped only with bare hands and basic tools, were tirelessly digging into the earth to save the lives of numerous young men trapped underground. Unfortunately, their endeavours were impeded by a lack of essential equipment, underscoring the challenges faced in this poor, remote region.

The governor of the Maradi region, Abubakar Shuaib, expressed condolences to the families of the victims during an interview with Amfani Radio and pledged a thorough investigation into the incident. Mayor Adamou Guero of the commune of Dan Issa highlighted the difficulty in controlling such incidents in gold mines, citing the commonality of these challenges. Governor Aboubacar Chaibou, who visited the area, emphasised the need to reorganise the operation to ensure both legal and dignified working conditions, promising a comprehensive review with a focus on maximum security.

Despite closures and security measures undertaken by the Niger government, the persistence of miners returning to the site, raises concerns about the effectiveness of existing preventive measures and further incidents could not be stopped. This underscores the need for continuous evaluation and adjustment of regulatory frameworks to align with the dynamic nature of artisanal and small-scale mining (ASM).

=== Niger's Commitment to Responsible Mining ===
The mine collapse highlighted the challenges surrounding ASM in the region. There has been a notable surge in attention towards the ASM sector, with heightened interest from governments overseeing production, companies procuring components globally, and international NGOs advocating for the responsible sourcing of minerals.

In response to the frequent collapses of gold mines as well as other issues associated with ASM, the Niger government showcased its commitment to responsible mining practices. The establishment of the Directorate of Small-Scale Mining and Quarrying and the Niger Mining Heritage Company (SOPAMIN), demonstrated a proactive approach to address the associated challenges. SOPAMIN’s role in enhancing compliance with safety standards and environmental regulations signifies the government's dedication to ensuring the sustainability of the mining sector.

SOPAMIN faces its own set of challenges including weak decentralisation, inaction and lack of leadership, limited resources, a mismatch of profiles and jobs within the administration, and a lack of synergy between state actors and local authorities. Addressing these internal challenges is crucial for SOPAMIN to effectively enforce and enhance the implementation of regulatory measures, ensuring the safety and sustainability of the mining sector.

=== Liptako-Gourma Integrated Development Authority (ALG) ===
The goal of the ALG is to transform the territories of its member states - Mali, Niger and Burkina Faso - into an economically integrated and flourishing domain. This is envisioned through a collaborative and sustainable utilisation of their natural resources within a peaceful and secure environment. The achievement of this vision is contingent on fostering stability, upholding good governance, and respecting human rights. The ALG's regional approach to addressing ASM challenges highlights the transnational nature of ASM. By bringing together its states, the ALG emphasised collaborative efforts to structure and formalise ASM, particularly for gold. This regional initiative contributes to the broader goal of fostering responsible mining practices internationally.

== Lesson emerging from the collapse ==
Key lesson learnt from this tragic incident are:

1. The formalization of artisanal mining, a type of mining that is illegal in many countries, which consequently obstructs the establishment of proper regulatory and policy frameworks in the sector. Additionally, the lack of formalization leaves community members in artisanal mines, often women and children, vulnerable to exploitation. It also worsens environmental challenges by enabling unregulated mining practices that harm the environment. Additionally, in the Sahel region of Niger, Burkina Faso, and Mali, research indicates a direct correlation between illegal artisanal mining and the escalation of various societal challenges, including heightened levels of violence, terrorism, organized crime, human rights abuses, and corruption. In the same context, artisanal mining activities in these countries often escape taxation, undermining national developmental goals like improved education and healthcare. To mitigate these challenges, governments need to consider the formalization of artisanal mining.
2. Safety Measures and Regulations: In artisanal mines where proper safety standards are often lacking, increasing the likelihood of accidents, the relevant government authorities should prioritize implementing, enforcing, and constantly monitoring safety guidelines to prevent such disasters from happening. Governments can enhance safety in artisanal mines by fostering public-private partnerships. By leveraging the expertise, resources, and knowledge of various stakeholders through public-private partnerships, governments can implement comprehensive safety initiatives. These initiatives may include the development and enforcement of safety standards, training programs for miners, and the introduction of modern and safer mining practices. This strategy has demonstrated success in Africa's Great Lakes region, where a collaborative effort involving the government, NGOs, private organizations, and mining industry associations has been instrumental in implementing a responsible mining program.
3. Education and Training: There is a need for education and training within the mining community, especially in artisanal mining where traditional and outdated methods are often employed. Miners should be equipped with knowledge about safe mining practices, geological risks, and emergency response protocols to minimize the likelihood of accidents. To further foster collective ownership and accountability, the involvement of the community is also crucial in promoting safe mining practices. Engaging with local communities is key in helping raise awareness about the risks associated with artisanal mining and encourage the adoption of safer methods. Providing support for alternative livelihoods can also reduce the pressure on individuals to engage in high-risk mining activities
4. Modernization of the Artisanal Mining Industry: While the Niger government shut down many artisanal mines in 2017 and has made efforts to regulate the industry, artisanal mining remains prevalent in the country, often conducted secretly and using outdated mining methods and tools. Consequently, the tragic incident highlights the imperative need to embrace the modernization of artisanal mining industries. This involves promoting safer and more efficient mining technologies and tools, as well as providing support for transitioning to more sustainable and regulated mining practices. One cost-effective approach for governments to encourage the use of modern technologies and tools in artisanal mines is by facilitating the transfer of obsolete or deprecated modern tools and machines from large-scale mines, as seen in the Burkina Faso mining industry.

== See also ==
- Samira Hill Gold Mine
