= Jeannette Schmidt Degener =

Nigerien businesswoman and politician

Member, National Assembly
- In office 1996–1999

Personal details
- Born: 1926
- Died: 19 February 2017 (aged 90–91)
- Citizenship: Niger
- Occupation: Politician, businesswoman

Jeannette Schmidt Degener (1926 – 19 February 2017) was a Nigerien businesswoman, feminist and politician. A member of the women's rights organization Union des Femmes du Niger, she became active in politics in the 1960s. From 1996 to 1999, she was the only woman to serve as a member of the National Assembly and was elected as the fourth vice president of its Bureau. She was successful in campaigning for the legal age for marriage for girls to be raised from 12 to 16.

== Early life ==
The daughter of a Tuareg mother and a French father, her maternal grandfather was Ag Mohammed Wau Teguidda Kaocen who led a revolt in 1916 against French colonial rule.

== Career ==
Initially Schmidt Degener worked in the import-export business and ran a number of hotels and restaurants. In 1960, she became a member of the Nigerien Progressive Party – African Democratic Rally (PPN-RDA) and was active in the women's rights association Union des Femmes du Niger. In the early 1990s, she joined the Democratic and Social Convention (CDS-Rahama) supported by President Mahamane Ousmane. When he was overthrown by Ibrahim Baré Maïnassara, she joined his support committee and, on its establishment, joined his National Union of Independents for Democratic Renewal (UNIRD), soon replaced by Rally for Democracy and Progress (RDP-Jama).

In the 1996 Nigerien parliamentary election, representing Commune I of the capital Niamey, Schmidt Degener was elected to the National Assembly where she held her seat until 1999. The only woman deputy during the Fourth Nigerien Republic, she was elected Fourth Vice President of the National Assembly's bureau. She successfully campaigned to increase the minimum age at which Nigerien girls could marry from 12 to 16 years.

Jeannette Schmidt Degener died on 19 February 2017 in Montauban, France. She had been married to the honorary Dutch consul to Niger and had five children.
