= Mehanna =

Mehanna is a surname, and may refer to:

- Hassan Mehanna (born 1997), Lebanese soccer player
- Lary Mehanna (born 1983), Lebanese soccer goalkeeper
- Magdi Mehanna (1956–2008), Egyptian journalist
- Rashad Mehanna (1909–1996), Egyptian army officer
- Tarek Mehanna, American pharmacist and convicted conspirator
