= Souleymane Ly =

Nigerien teacher and politician

Personal details
- Born: October 23, 1919 Fada N'Gourma, Burkina Faso
- Died: December 12, 1994 Niamey, Niger
- Occupation: Educator, Politician

Souleymane Ly (born October 23, 1919 – December 12, 1994) was a Nigerien educator and politician.

== Biography ==
=== Career in education ===
Souleymane Ly attended the William-Ponty Normal School. From 1942, he held various positions in the Nigerien education system. Initially a school director in Gouré, he became deputy director of the Zengou school in Zinder in 1943 and director of the primary school in Tahoua in 1945. In the same year, he became secretary of educational supervision in the capital, Niamey. In 1957, Ly took over the management of a school in Dogondoutchi and in 1958 the management of the Birni regional school in Zinder. He then worked from 1960 as a district inspector. In the 1940s and 1950s, alongside Mahamane Dan Dobi, Zada Niandou, and Djibo Yacouba, he was one of the influential figures in establishing theatrical life in urban centers in Niger.

=== Political career ===
In 1961, a year after Niger's independence, Souleymane Ly transitioned to political administration. He first worked as chief of staff at the Ministry of Rural Economy. In 1963, he became chief of staff at the Ministry of Defense, Information, and Youth, and in 1966 deputy district commander of Tillabéri. Ly was appointed sub-prefect of Illéla in 1966 and sub-prefect of Mirriah in 1967, a position he held until 1968.

Souleymane Ly later served as director of the National School of Administration. In 1971, he was appointed Secretary-General of the Nigerien government. He resigned from this position on September 30, 1974, and dedicated himself again to education for the next twenty years until his death, as director of Lako College in Niamey.

== Honors ==
- Knight of the French National Order of Merit (1973)
- Officer of the Order of Academic Palms (1978)
- Grand Cross of the National Order of Niger (1993)
