= July 2025 Al-Bab raid =

- Part of War against the Islamic State, war on terror and US intervention in the Syrian civil war
Date	25 July 2025
Location	Al-Bab, Aleppo Governorate, Syria
Result	Operational success

Belligerents
United States: CENTCOM; SDF; Syria; Intelligence Support : Turkey	Islamic State

Commanders and leaders
(United States) Michael Kurilla	(Islamic State) Dhiya’ Zawba Muslih al-Hardani †

Casualties and losses
None	(Islamic State) 3 killed

The July 2025 Al-Bab raid was a coordinated operation by the International Coalition and the Syrian Democratic Forces and the Syrian Transitional Government forces against Islamic State cells in Aleppo.

== Prelude ==
In May, ISIS attacked the Syrian transitional government forces using IEDs which was their first attack on the government after the Fall of the Assad regime. The Isis leader Dhiya’ Zawba Muslih al-Hardani posed threat to the coalition forces as well as to the Syrian government.

ISIS had renewed its attacks on the Syrian Democratic Forces following several assaults on the SDF in the month of July. 5 SDF members were killed by an attack in July.

== Operation ==
On 25 July, CENTCOM in coordination with the Syrian Democratic Forces and the Syrian transitional government conducted a raid in the city of Al-Bab early in the morning, which resulted in the killing of Dhiya’ Zawba Muslih al-Hardani and his two sons, Abdallah Dhiya al-Hardani and Abd al-Rahman Dhiya Zawba al-Hardani who were affiliated with the Islamic State. It also targeted three women and children, no civilan casualties were reported. Prior to the operation, US forces relocated personnel and equipment from Sarrin base to other locations of deployment.

SOHR reported that the International Coalition carried an airdrop near the Boghazal neighbourhood in the city of Al-Bab which targeted an Islamic State cell. Ground troops of the General Security Forces and the SDF took part in the operation. A strict security was put in the site with the heavy deployment of troops and flights by the coalition forces.

== Aftermath ==
After the Operation, CENTCOM commander Gen. Michael Erik Kurilla quoted " We will continue to relentlessly pursue ISIS terrorists wherever they operate. ISIS terrorists are not safe where they sleep, where they operate, and where they hide. Alongside our partners and allies, U.S. Central Command is committed to the enduring defeat of ISIS terrorists that threaten the region, our allies, and our homeland."
