= Union des Femmes du Niger =

Women's association in Niger

- Union des Femmes du Niger
- Predecessor: Association des Femmes
- Successor: Association des Femmes du Niger
- Formation: 1959; 67 years ago
- Founder: Aissa Diori
- Founded at: Niamey
- Dissolved: 1974; 52 years ago
- Purpose: Women's rights
- Key people: Fatou Djibo
- Affiliations: Nigerien Progressive Party

The Union des Femmes du Niger (UFN) was a women's organisation in Niger, which was active from 1959 to 1974 and was affiliated to the Nigerien Progressive Party. It advocated, with limited success, for increases in women's rights.

== History ==
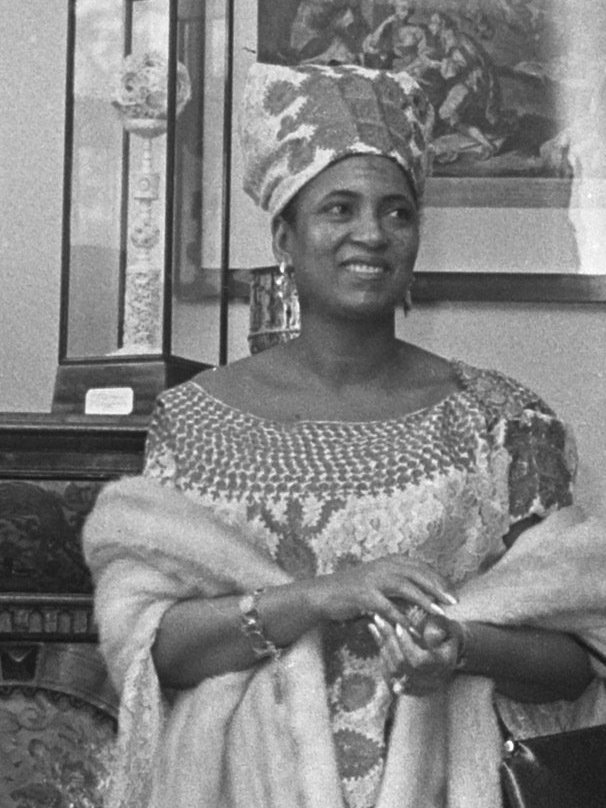
Aissa Diori, patron.

The Union des Femmes du Niger (UFN) was established in 1959 and its patron was Aïssa Diori, the wife of the, at that time, future President Hamani Diori. It was preceded by the Association des Femmes, which had been established in 1956 as an alliance of women from Niamey. However many felt that organisation was too elite and the UFN was intended to be more inclusive. It was an affiliation of the Nigerien Progressive Party. By 1962 the president of the UFN was the teacher Fatou Djibo; both vice-presidents were also teachers. Another prominent member was the entrepreneur Jeannette Schmidt Degener.

Niger has a long tradition of women's networks, and the UFN expanded the kind of work undertaken to include political demands. The overarching goal of the organization was equality between women and men. The UFN promoted the education of women, the improvement of sanitary facilities and the creation of women-specific jobs. It was also one of the financial supporters of the Nigerien National Museum. The UFN was unsuccessful in its demands for legislative reforms on marriage law and the bride price. As part of their lobbying, the UFN also called for the Diori government to reform divorce law, "reducing men's ability to unilaterally divorce their wives" and create fairer circumstances for child custody. UFN members also tried to get on the list of candidates for the parliamentary elections of 1970, in fact not a single woman was represented on it. The UFN called on the government to create jobs for women, including calls for a female police force.

The Union des Femmes du Niger ended with the military coup of 15 April 1974, in which all existing political structures were dissolved. Under the rule of the Supreme Military Council, a successor organisation was founded in 1975 - the Association des Femmes du Niger.

== Historiography ==
Political scientist Aili Tripp has argued that despite superficially advocating for increased rights for women in Niger, the UNF also acted to regulate "women's morality".
