= Samira Hill Gold Mine =

Gold mine in Tillabéri, Niger

Samira Hill
- Location in Niger
- Location: Téra Department, Tillabéri Region, Niger; 13°24′42.3″N 001°13′42.61″E
- Opened: 2004
- Company: Societe des Mines du Liptako

The Samira Hill Gold Mine (fr. Mine d'Or du Mont Samira) is a gold mine in Téra Department of the Tillabéri Region in Niger. Opened in late 2004, it is the first industrial scale gold mine in the nation, and while operated by a Canadian/Moroccan consortia, the government of Niger owns both a 20% stake in its operation, and functions under government concession. The mine, and the possibility that other gold concessions will follow, is projected to be an important component of future export revenue for the West African state.

== Mining in Tera ==
Exploitable deposits of gold have long been known to exist in Niger in the region between the Niger River and the border with Burkina Faso, and artisanal gold mining has previously taken place in the area. The Namaga concession upon which the Mine was built, is hoped to be the first mine to produce gold from the Tera greenstone belt which surrounds Koma Bangou, the country's largest artisanal mining site. Koma Bangou was first discovered by ONAREM (l'Office National des Resources Minieres, the Nigerien government's mining company) in 1985.

== SML consortia ==
The mine is operated by Moroccan headquartered SML (Societe des Mines du Liptako), a joint venture between Canadian Societe Semafo Inc and Canadian Etruscan Resources Incorporated. Both companies own 80% (40% - 40%) of SML and the Government of Niger holds a 20% stake.

The mine site itself was created around the Samira Hill gold deposit, found on the Tiawa exploration permit and the Libiri gold deposit (three kilometers away) found on the Saoura exploration permit.

== Production ==
On 5 October 2004, President Mamadou Tandja announced the official opening of the Samira Hill Gold Mine, and the first Nigerien gold ingot was presented to him. This marked a historical moment for Niger as the Samira Hill Gold Mine represents the first commercial gold production in the country.

The mine's two pits are open pits, 3 km from one another, both around 5 km north of the Burkina Faso border, and 95 km west-north-west from Niamey. The larger Samira Pit and the Libiri pit run east–west along the site, with Libiri pit to the east. The ore processing is done by crushing, grinding, and carbon leaching (Gold cyanidation), which requires a pipeline pumping water from the nearby Sirba River, to the east of the site, as well as a large reservoir and waste pits.

The first year's production is predicted to be 135,000 troy ounces (4,200 kg; 9,260 lb avoirdupois) of gold at a cash value of US$177 per ounce ($5.70/g). The mine reserves for the Samira Hill mine total 10,073,626 tons at an average grade of 2.21 grams per ton from which 618,000 troy ounces (19,200 kg; 42,400 lb) will be recovered over a 6-year mine life. SML believes to have a number of significant gold deposits within what is now recognized as the gold belt known as the "Samira Horizon", which is located between Gotheye and Ouallam.

Prior to production, the estimated totals of both pits were 10.08 million t grading 2.2 g/t Au (ore), from which it was projected 618,000 troy ounces would be produced in the estimated 6.2 years of mine life. Etruscan has projected that the Koma Bangou deposit contains reserve of 315000 oz of gold.

In 2008, Semafo announced it had discovered two new possible mine sites on its concessions, to the east and west of its current mines. Sikia 1, 1 km in length, is southeast of Libiri pit, while Libiri Plateau, northeast of the Libiri pit, runs 500 meters. It is thought the immediate are could produce pits 10 km east and west of the current site.

== See also ==
- Niger gold mine collapse
