= Wiye and Deykoukou massacres =

2021 terrorist incident in Niger

- Part of Jihadist insurgency in Niger and Fulani-Zarma conflict
- Location: Wiye and Deykoukou, Bani-Bangou commune, Tillaberi Region, Niger
- Date: July 25 and 28, 2021; 3pm (Wiye); 8:30 a.m. (Deykoukou)
- Target: Zarma civilians and farmers
- Deaths: 33+: 14 killed in Wiye; 17+ killed in Deykoukou
- Injuries: 5+: 1+ injured in Wiye; 4+ injured in Deykoukou
- Victim: 269 families displaced from Deykoukou
- Perpetrator: Islamic State in the Greater Sahara

On July 25 and 28, 2021, jihadists from the Islamic State in the Greater Sahara attacked civilians in the villages of Wiye and Deykoukou, Bani-Bangou Department, Tillabéri Region, Niger, killing at least 33 people. All of the victims were Zarma, and the massacre was part of the Fulani-Zarma conflict and a series of massacres against Zarma civilians by the ISGS.

== Background ==
At the start of 2021, the Islamic State in the Greater Sahara (ISGS), a predominantly-Fulani jihadist group, began attacking civilians en masse across Niger. The massacres started with the Tchoma Bangou and Zaroumdareye massacres in January 2021, where over a hundred mostly-Zarma civilians were killed. These attacks continued against Zarma civilians, with massacres in Darey-Daye in March killing 66 and massacres in Tillia killing 141 a week later.

== Massacres ==
The first massacre occurred in Wiye, a rural village in the Banibangou commune of Tillaberi region, on July 25. At about 3pm local time that day, a group of armed men on motorcycles shot at Zarma civilians in a field. Nine people working in the field were killed, with local residents stating that the motorcycle tracks showed that the victims were killed at a close range. Five more bodies were discovered on two local roads. A survivor of the attack stated that as soon as he heard the motorcycles, everyone took off running. A friend he was with was shot three time and survived. The survivor added that the attackers wanted to drive the farmers off of their land. One injured victim was evacuated to a hospital in Niamey.

The attack on Deykoukou took place at 8:30 a.m. on July 28, also in Banibangou. A survivor of the massacre stated that he and other residents heard shots around that time, and two young farmers were killed. When residents went to go retrieve the bodies, armed gunmen hiding behind granaries and bushes popped out and shot indiscriminately at the villagers. Seventeen people were killed and four were injured in the Deykoukou massacre. The attack was the third on the village within nine days. 269 families fled Deykoukou following the attack, many settling in Bani-Bangou town.
