= 2025 Duhok axe attack =

Terrorist attack in Kurdistan Region of Iraq

- Part of the Iraqi insurgency (2017–present)
- Location: Duhok, Kurdistan Region, Iraq
- Date: 1 April 2025
- Target: Assyrians
- Attack type: Axe attack
- Weapon: Axe
- Deaths: 0
- Injuries: 3
- Perpetrator: Islamic State
- Assailant: Luay Abdul Rahim
- No. of participants: 1
- Motive: Anti-Assyrian sentiment, Islamic fundamentalism
- Verdict: Life imprisonment

On 1 April 2025, a Syrian refugee conducted an attack against Assyrians celebrating the annual Kha b-Nisan festival in Duhok, Iraq. The perpetrator, Luay Abdul Rahim, was indoctrinated by the Islamic State (IS) and officially joined the group in 2024 before plotting the attack. In total, three people were injured, and Rahim was arrested immediately by security forces. Celebrations continued afterward, with an Assyrian flag used to wipe blood off one of the injured attendees later being waved for the rest of celebrations.

The attack saw wide condemnation from government officials and the Assyrian community. The attack also simultaneously caused concerns among Assyrians about their security in Iraq. Rahim's identity was revealed in a confession released on 10 April, and in January 2026, he was sentenced to life imprisonment for his role in the attack.

== Background ==
Celebrations of the Assyrian New Year began in front of the Virgin Mary Church in Duhok as participants went along the main street to a celebration square at Mazi complex. The parade brought Assyrians from homeland and diaspora, who wore traditional clothes and waved the Assyrian flag as the celebrations continued. Over 5,000 diaspora Assyrians took part in the celebrations, which marked the year 6775 in the Assyrian calendar.

== Attack ==
The attacker initially hid the weapons in a bag until making his way to the scene of parades. The attacker conducted the attack in an open marketplace, and first injured an elderly woman before turning to the parade. Videos of the attack surfaced on social media that featured the attacker yelling religious phrases, namely "Islamic State," as he ran towards the marching crowd, before being restrained. Three people were injured in the attack, including a young man who was seen wiping blood off his head with the Assyrian flag. Subsequently, the bloodied flag was waved during the rest of the parade, in what Stella Martany of the Associated Press described as a symbol of resilience and cultural pride.

After the attack, celebrations of Akitu continued as planned, with attendees continuing to wave flags and performing traditional dances.

== Investigation ==
The attacker was immediately arrested by the Duhok Security Directorate. A source close to the Iraqi Shafaq News stated that the attacker had conducted the attack as a terrorist operation linked to IS, and published a video showcasing him being held down. Investigations by the Kurdistan Region Security Council also made similar claims.

Initial reports stated that the assailant was a Syrian national living in the Domiz refugee camp in Duhok. On 10 April, the KRSC identified the assailant as Luay Abdul Rahim (also known as Abu Jahiman al-Baghouzi) and released a video confession from him the same day. Rahim was born in Qamishli in 2003; in the video, he stated that he became indoctrinated by IS after following their social media accounts and reading their publications. He eventually pledged allegiance to an emir named "Abu Hafsa al-Hashemi al-Qurashi" and joined the organization in 2024, and underwent "religious and jihadist courses." He chose to carry out the attack on 1 April, since he knew it would be during Akitu festivals.

The investigations confirmed that three people were injured in the attack. A young man from Bakhdida and an older woman from Ain Baqrah, a village near Alqosh, suffered skull fractures, while a member of local security forces was also wounded from the attack. The woman, named Yoniyah Khoshaba, was shopping with her daughter near the parade when she was attacked. She suffered a hemorrhage, although she was in stable condition and did not require any surgery. The young man, named Fardi, was treated for a skull injury before returning home. His mother, Athraa Abdullah, said that he had been sending photos before she learned about the attack. Former politician Srood Maqdasy, who treated the victims of the attack at a hospital, confirmed their identities in an interview with Rudaw Media Network.

In January 2026, the Erbil Criminal Court issued a life imprisonment sentence to Rahim after he was convicted of carrying out the attack.

== Reactions ==
Shortly after the attack, the Assyrian Democratic Movement condemned the incident, with political bureau member Ninab Yousif Toma stating that it was the first of its kind since public celebrations for the Assyrian New Year began in Duhok in the 1990s. The governor of Duhok, Ali Tatar, held a press conference and publicly condemned the attack as cowardly, and emphasized the need for coexistence of ethnic and religious groups in the region. The United Nations Assistance Mission for Iraq (UNAMI) also wrote a condemnation of the incident, while Dr. Mohamed Al-Hassan (UNAMI's head) praised the swift response by authorities to arrest Rahim. Condemnations were also offered by the Kurdistan Region Presidency, the Kurdistan Region Minister of Transportation Ano Abdoka, and other members of ADM.

The attack was greatly condemned by members of the Assyrian community, who were subjected to hate speech on social media as news of the attack surfaced. According to Assyrian National Broadcasting, the Kurdish neo-Nazi group Hawpa published a statement welcoming the attack and praising the attacker. The event also stirred outrage and sparked concerns about the safety of Assyrians who remain in Iraq, and the willingness of the diaspora to make returns to live in the country or visit for celebrations. The ADM called for the criminalization of hate speech and extremism, as well as public transparency of the investigations. Ashur Sliwa Niqo, who was a senior official in the party, also called for a public trial, and urged authorities not to dismiss the attack as an isolated event.

== See also ==
- Assyrians in Iraq
- Akitu
- 2024 Wakeley church stabbing
