= Dargol =

Coordinates: 13°55′N 1°15′E

- Commune and village
- Interactive map of Dargol
- Country: Niger

Area
  - Total: 920 sq mi (2,390 km^{2})

Population (2012 census)
  - Total: 147,779
  - Density: 160/sq mi (61.8/km^{2})
- Time zone: UTC+1 (WAT)

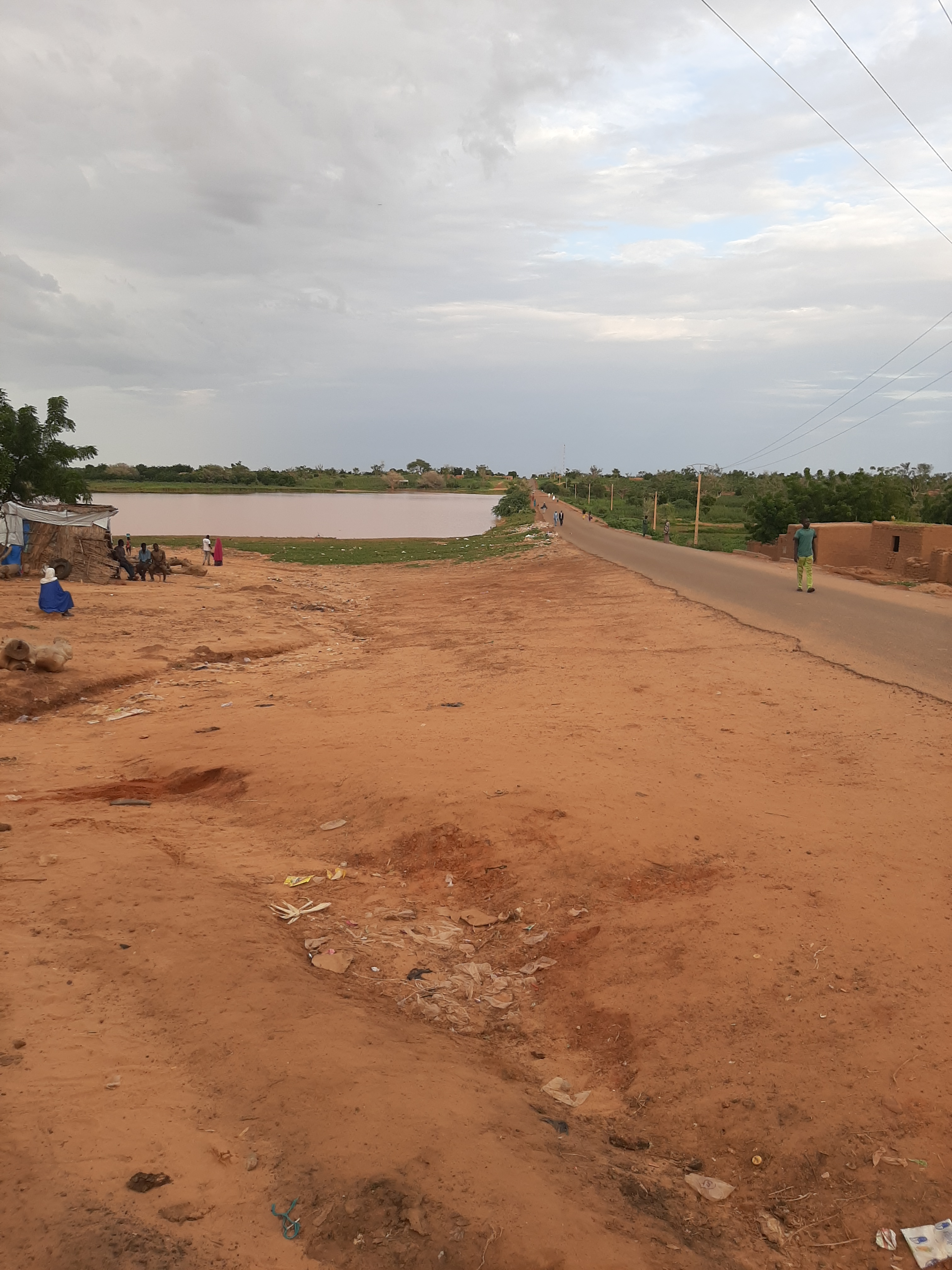
National Road 4 near the village of Bandio in the municipality of Dargol (2023)

Dargol is a village and rural commune in Niger. As of 2012, it had a population of 147,779.
