= Kokorou =

- Commune and town
- Location in Niger
- Coordinates: 14°12′41″N 0°55′1″E
- Country: Niger
- Department: Téra Department

Area
  - Total: 841 sq mi (2,177 km^{2})

Population (2012 census)
  - Total: 96,218
  - Density: 114.5/sq mi (44.20/km^{2})
- Time zone: UTC+1 (WAT)

Designations

Ramsar Wetland
- Official name: Complexe Kokorou-Namga
- Designated: 17 June 2001
- Reference no.: 1071

Kokorou or Kokoro is a town and rural commune in the Téra Department of western Niger. As of 2012, it had a population of 96,218, living in rural towns and villages.

It gives its name to the nearby Kokoro and Namga Wetlands, which was designated a Ramsar site in 2001. Covering 668 km^{2}, the wetland hosts migratory birdlife and is important to the local ecology.

== People ==
The nobles of Kokoro village are Songhay people, who trace their ancestry in the male line to Askia Mohammed Toure. They came to Kokoro in the early part of the 18th century. When French colonists reached Kokoro in 1899, the local people cooperated with them, paying taxes and providing laborers. This cooperation brought prosperity, and the Kokoro people helped the French to establish the market at Mehanna on the Niger river. However, on the death of the old Kokoru chief in 1964, the French appointed a non-noble merchant in his place, instead of appointing his natural successor. The local people still resent this decision.

== Wetland ==
The large, shallow and brackish Kokoro wetland lies in an ancient valley surrounded by sand-dunes, granite outcrops and flat-topped hills. At one time, the valley may have drained into the Niger River to the northeast, but it now has no outlet. The wetland contains water from 7–12 months of each year, and at times is 13 km long and 2,100 ha in area. Rainfall varies greatly from year to year. At the western end there is a tree-covered flood-plain. The wetland is an important ecological zone on the African-Eurasian flyway, and has been designated a Ramsar site. Although government-owned, it may be used by the local population under supervision. The wetland is used heavily for cattle grazing in the dry season, which may be damaging the plant life. It was stocked with fish in 1986, but the only surviving species is the lungfish Protopterus annectens, which caught with nets and lines by the local people. Sand dunes threaten the northern border of the wetland, and have been the target of a dune-fixation program.

== Settlements ==
- Amara
- Béra
- Dossa Kourégou
- Doungouro
- Fambita
- Loudji
- Sédey
