= Diagourou, Niger =

Coordinates: 13°54′27″N 0°48′42″E

- Commune and village
- Interactive map of Diagourou, Niger
- Country: Niger

Area
  - Total: 491 sq mi (1,271 km^{2})

Population (2012 census)
  - Total: 61,472
  - Density: 125.3/sq mi (48.37/km^{2})
- Time zone: UTC+1 (WAT)

Diagourou, Niger is a village and rural commune in Niger. As of 2012, it had a population of 61,472.
