= Gurma people =

Ethnic group in West Africa

Gurma
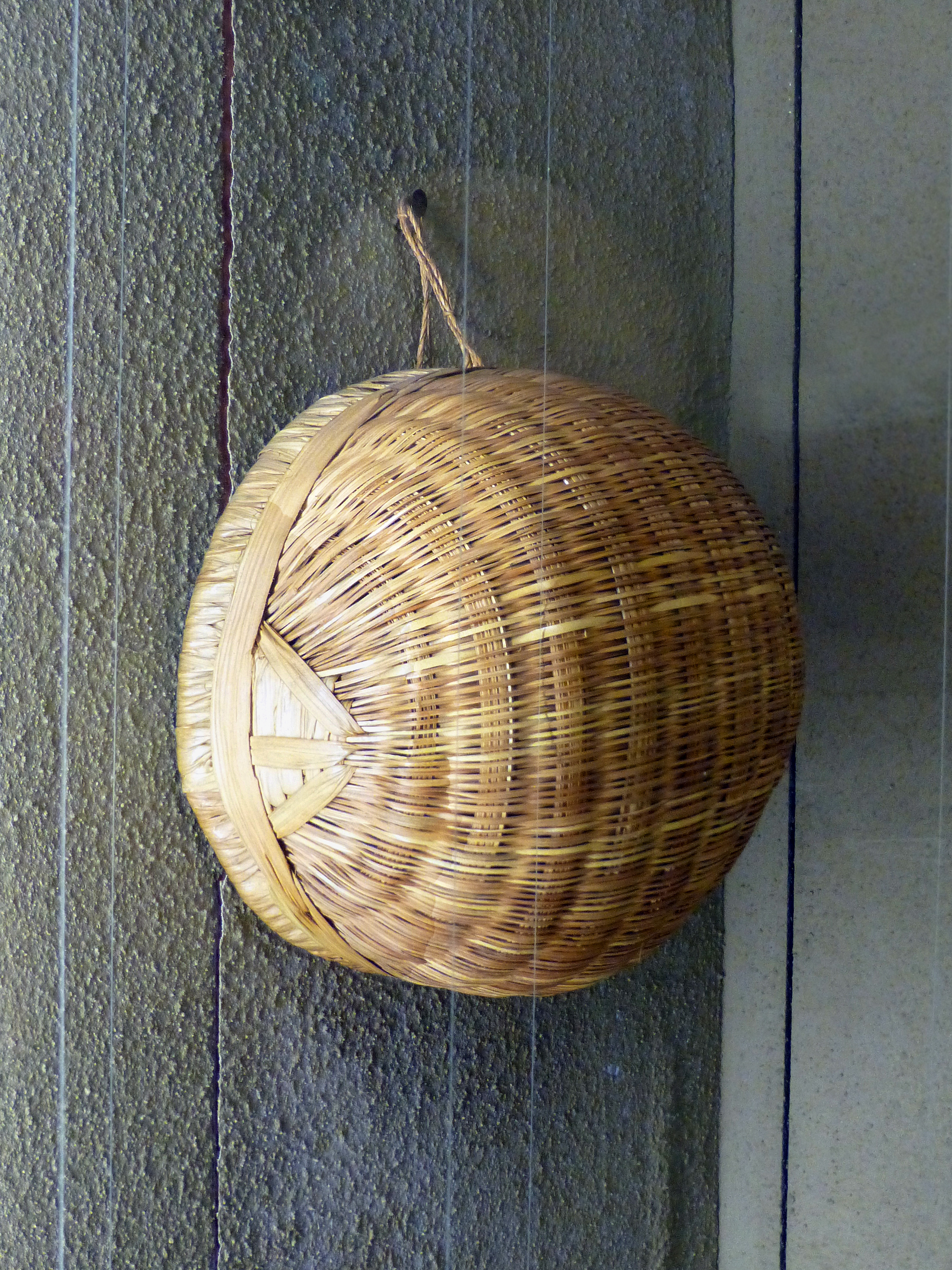
- A semi-sphere made by the Gurma in the Musée Africain in Lyon

Total population
- ~3.6 million

Regions with significant populations
- Ghana: 1,845,255 (2021)
- Burkina Faso: 1,496,786 (2021)
- Niger: 188,846 (2021)

Languages
- Gourmanché, French, Ngangam, Ntcham, Nateni

Religion
- Islam

Related ethnic groups
- other Gur peoples

- People: bigurmanceba
- Language: migurmancema

The Gurma (or Gourma or Gourmantché) are an ethnic group living mainly in northeastern Ghana, Burkina Faso, around Fada N'Gourma, and also in northern areas of Togo and Benin, as well as southwestern Niger.

They might include the Bassaries who live in northern Togo and the Northern Volta of Kingdom of Dagbon, Ghana.

Gurma is also the name of a language spoken by the Gurma people, which is part of the Gur language family. See Gourmanché and Oti–Volta languages for related languages spoken by the Gurma.

== Overview ==
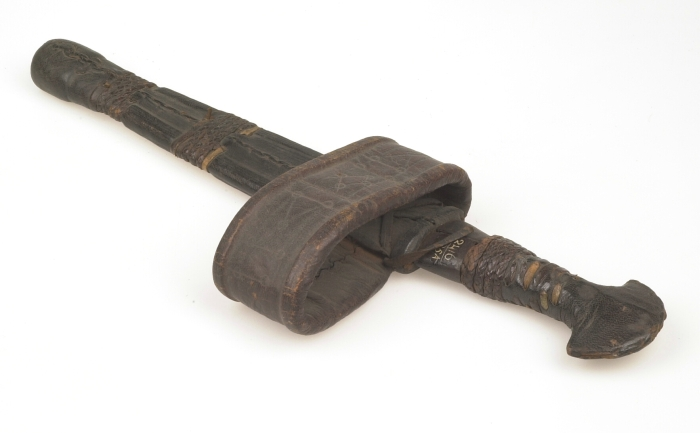
Gurma weapon

In 1985, Dr. Richard Alan Swanson wrote a book about the Gourmantché, Gourmantché Ethnoanthropology: A Theory of Human Being. The book presents Gourmantché perception of 'human being' from the perspective of the people themselves, using their own language texts to illustrate concepts. Concepts of God (Otienu), destiny (licabili), the body (gbannandi), life (limiali), death (mikuuma), and all known terms for human body parts are also discussed.

In 2006, in Burkina Faso, Salif Titamba Lankoande published a book on the History and Ethnography of the Gourmantché (“Les Gourmantche”, Presses Africaines du Burkina, Ouagadougou, 2006, 211 p.).

In 2012, the Portuguese, Dr. João Pedro Galhano Alves, published in Paris a book on the Gourmantché people and culture, and on the Ethnobiology of the coexistence among humans, lions and biodiversity in the region of the W of Niger, in Niger ("Anthropologie et écosystèmes au Niger. Humains, lions et esprits de la forêt dans la culture gourmantché ", Editions l’Harmattan, Paris, 2012, 448 p.). Since 2005, he also published other books and several articles about this subject and about Gourmantché people. This publications are the result of research fieldwork made by the author in the W of Niger (Niger), between 2002 and 2010. Also, in 2010 and 2011, the Museo Nacional de Ciencias Naturales (Madrid, Spain), from the Consejo Superior de Investigaciones Científicas (Spain) presented a public exhibition mainly based on the research works of this Anthropologist and Ethnobiologist, showing his main data, analysis and concepts, a selection of his photographic archive and his collection of ethnographic and ethnobiological objects collected in several research fields; One part of this exhibition was about the Gourmantché culture and the coexistence among humans, lions and biodiversity in the W of Niger; The title of this exhibition was "Vivir en biodiversidad total con leones, tigres o lobos".

== Bibliography ==
- (in English) João Pedro Galhano Alves, "Humans, lions and biodiversity in the W of Niger. The Gourmantché culture”, “Bajo el Árbol de la Palabra: Resistencias y Transformaciones entre lo Local y lo Global”, Libro del Congreso, 8º Congreso Ibérico de Estudios Africanos (CIEA 8), Grupo de Estudios Africanos (GEA), Facultad de Derecho, Universidad Autónoma de Madrid, 14-16 Junio 2012, Madrid, 2012, pp. 269–270.
- (in English) João Pedro Galhano Alves, "Gourmantché religion and philosophy. Speaking with the “spiritual beings” of nature’. A study in Niger W region”, “Bajo el Árbol de la Palabra: Resistencias y Transformaciones entre lo Local y lo Global”, Libro del Congreso, 8º Congreso Ibérico de Estudios Africanos (CIEA 8), Grupo de Estudios Africanos (GEA), Facultad de Derecho, Universidad Autónoma de Madrid, 14-16 Junio 2012, Madrid, 2012, pp. 270–271.
- (in French) João Pedro Galhano Alves, "Anthropologie et écosystèmes au Niger. Humains, lions et esprits de la forêt dans la culture gourmantché ", Editions l’Harmattan, Paris, 2012, 448 p.
- (in Spanish) João Pedro Galhano Alves, "Antropología y ecosistemas. Vivir en biodiversidad total con leones, tigres o lobos. India – Niger - Portugal", Gobierno de España, Ministerio de Ciencia y Innovación de España, Ministerio de Medio Ambiente, Rural y Marino de España, Museo Nacional de Ciencias Naturales de España, Consejo Superior de Investigaciones Científicas de España, Fondo Europeo Agrícola de Desarrollo Rural (FEADER), Unión Europea, Madrid, 2011, 168 p.
- (in English) João Pedro Galhano Alves, Soumaïla Mordia Wali, "Coexistence among humans, lions and biodiversity in the W of Niger”, “People makes places. Ways of feeling the world”, The 10th congress of the International Society of Ethnology and Folklore (SIEF), Faculdade de Ciências Sociais e Humanas, Universidade Nova de Lisboa, Panel 315, “Conflicts and perceptions of environment in Natural Protected Areas”, 17–21 April 2011, Lisboa, 2011, p. 248.
- (in Portuguese) João Pedro Galhano Alves, "Viver com leões. A coexistência entre humanos e biodiversidade no W do Níger. Os Gourmantché”, Trabalhos de Antropologia e Etnologia, Sociedade Portuguesa de Antropologia e de Etnologia, Vol. 49 (1–4), Porto, 2009, pp. 57–77.
- (in English) João Pedro Galhano Alves, "The artificial simulacrum world. The geopolitical elimination of communitary [sic] land use and its effects on our present global condition”, Eloquent Books, New York, 2009, 71 p.
- (in English) João Pedro Galhano Alves, "From land to a simulacrum world; an anthropological essay on the history of an agricultural geo-policy: the elimination of communitary land use systems and its ecological, socio-cultural, psychological and political effects”, The Digital Library of the Commons, Indiana University, Bloomington, Indiana, 2009, 31 p.
- (in Portuguese) João Pedro Galhano Alves, ”Viver com leões. A coexistência entre humanos e biodiversidade no W do Níger. Os Gourmantché”, Livro do IV Congresso da Associação Portuguesa de Antropologia, Classificar o Mundo, 9-11 Setembro 2009, Associação Portuguesa de Antropologia, Lisboa, 2009, p. 251.
- (in Portuguese) João Pedro Galhano Alves, "Viver com leões. A coexistência entre humanos e biodiversidade no W do Níger. Os Gourmantché”, Programa do IV Congresso da Associação Portuguesa de Antropologia, Classificar o Mundo, 9-11 Setembro 2009, Associação Portuguesa de Antropologia, Lisboa, 2009, p. 45.
- (in English) João Pedro Galhano Alves, “Living with lions”, Down To Earth, Centre for Science and Environment, Vol. 17, nº 6, August 1–15, 2008, New Delhi, 2008, pp. 48–50.
- (in English) João Pedro Galhano Alves, "Social rules about dealing with lions in Niger”, The New Nation, Bangladesh's independent News Source, August 18, 2008, Dhaka, 2008, 1 p.
- (in Portuguese) João Pedro Galhano Alves, “Caçar com os "génios". Representações da natureza e conservação da biodiversidade no Parque Nacional do W, Niger”, Trabalhos de Antropologia e Etnologia, Sociedade Portuguesa de Antropologia e de Etnologia, Vol. 47 (1–4), Porto, 2007, pp. 93–122.
- (in English) João Pedro Galhano Alves, "Human societies and lions in W National Park region (Niger). A synopsis of lion related matters developed in an anthropology of nature research”, African Lion News, Vol. 7 (April 2007), Official newsletter of the African Lion Working Group, IUCN, Species Survival Commission, Cat and Conservation Breeding Specialist Group, Brandhof, 2007, pp. 27–44.
- (in Portuguese) João Pedro Galhano Alves, "Uso e representações da natureza na região do Parque Nacional do W, Niger. Ilustrações a partir da caça com arco e outras práticas", Terceiro Congresso da Associação Portuguesa de Antropologia. Afinidade e Diferença, 6-8 Abril 2006, Resumos, Associação Portuguesa de Antropologia, Instituto de Ciências Sociais da Universidade de Lisboa, Instituto Superior de Ciências do Trabalho e da Empresa, Lisboa, 2006, p. 22.
- (in English) João Pedro Galhano Alves, "Coexistence among Human and Lion Societies; a short outline of an ethnobiology research carried out in W National Park region (Niger)", Xth International Congress of Ethnobiology (ICE 2006), Ethnobiology: Food, Health, and Cultural Landscape, 5–9 November 2006, Contributions, Received Papers, The International Society of Ethnobiology, Thai Library Association, Khon Kaen University, Chiang Mai University, Rajabhat Chiang Rai University, Mae Fah Luang University, Chiang Rai, 2006, 8 p.
- (in English) João Pedro Galhano Alves, "Bow and Arrow Hunting as Key Component of West Africa Savannah Societies' Use and Perceptions of Nature; the example of W National Park region, Niger", Xth International Congress of Ethnobiology (ICE 2006), Ethnobiology: Food, Health, and Cultural Landscape, 5–9 November 2006, Contributions, Received Papers, The International Society of Ethnobiology, Thai Library Association, Khon Kaen University, Chiang Mai University, Rajabhat Chiang Rai University, Mae Fah Luang University, Chiang Rai, 2006, 4 p.
- (in English) João Pedro Galhano Alves, "Coexistence among Human and Lion Societies; a short outline of an ethnobiology research carried out in W National Park region (Niger)", Program, Abstracts, and List of Participants, Xth International Congress of Ethnobiology, ICE 2006, Ethnobiology: Food, Health, and Cultural Landscape, 5–9 November 2006, The International Society of Ethnobiology, Thai Library Association, Khon Kaen University, Chiang Mai University, Rajabhat Chiang Rai University, Mae Fah Luang University, Chiang Rai, 2006, 8 p.
- (in English) João Pedro Galhano Alves, "Bow and Arrow Hunting as Key Component of West Africa Savannah Societies' Use and Perceptions of Nature; the example of W National Park region, Niger", Program, Abstracts, and List of Participants, Xth International Congress of Ethnobiology, ICE 2006, Ethnobiology: Food, Health, and Cultural Landscape, 5–9 November 2006, The International Society of Ethnobiology, Thai Library Association, Khon Kaen University, Chiang Mai University, Rajabhat Chiang Rai University, Mae Fah Luang University, Chiang Rai, 2006, pp. 9–12.
- (in English) João Pedro Galhano Alves, Ali Harouna, "Human Societies, Lions and Biodiversity in West Africa. The example of Niger W National Park region (East Gourma)", Selección de Textos, Máster en Espacios Naturales Protegidos, módulo 3 Desarrollo sostenible y servicios ambientales (coordinador Prof. Catedrático António Goméz Sal), Universidad Autónoma de Madrid, Universidad Complutense de Madrid, Universidad de Alcalá, Fundación Fernando González Bernáldez, EUROPARC España, Alcalá de Henares, 2005, 4 p.
- (in English) Richard Alan Swanson, “Gourma ethnoanatomy: a theory of human being”, Ph.D. Thesis, Northwestern University, Evanston, Illinois, 1976, 437 p.
- (in French) Salif Titamba Lankoande, “Les Gourmantche”, Presses Africaines du Burkina, Ouagadougou, 2006, 211 p.
