= List of United States special forces raids during the Syrian civil war =

The following is a partial list of all known ground raids undertaken by United States special operations forces in Syria on forces (primarily those of the Islamic State of Iraq and the Levant) engaged in the Syrian Civil War. Along with conducting raids, U.S. special forces in Syria regularly take part in battles against the Islamic State alongside allied Syrian Democratic Forces, primarily in a "train, advise, and assist" role, with 2,000 U.S. special forces soldiers being deployed in Syria by the end of 2017.

== List of attacks ==
Date	Location	Notes	Ref.
July 4, 2014	Uqayrishah, near Raqqa	Main article: 2014 American rescue mission in Syria Two dozen U.S. special forces operatives parachuted near an ISIL prison and conducted an assault on it in an attempt to rescue captured journalist James Foley. The special forces swept through the prison, killing 8 ISIL fighters while taking no casualties, but could not locate Foley. They came to the conclusion that Foley had been moved out of the prison the day before, and abandoned the mission. Foley was later executed by ISIL.	
May 15, 2015	al-Amr, Deir ez-Zor Governorate	Main article: May 2015 U.S. special forces raid in Syria On 15 May 2015, 1st SFOD-Delta operators from the Joint Special Operations Command based in Iraq conducted an operation in Al-Amr to capture a senior Islamic State of Iraq and the Levant (ISIL) leader named Abu Sayyaf. Sayyaf and his guards resisted capture, resulting in a heavy firefight in which 13 ISIL fighters (including Sayyaf) were killed with zero U.S. casualties. Intelligence discovered in the raid revealed how ISIL was funding itself through the group's construction of a multinational oil operation with help from terrorist-group executives determined to maximize profits. The intelligence also showed how the organization deals with the Syrian regime, handles corruption allegations among top officials and most critically, how international coalition strikes had dented but not destroyed ISIS income. Defense Secretary Ash Carter called the raid a “significant blow” against Islamic State and heralded the death of the terror group's No. 2 oil executive.	
March 25, 2016	Deir ez-Zor Governorate, near the Iraqi border	ISIL's deputy leader in Syria, Abu Ali al-Anbari, was killed by JSOC special forces operatives in March 2016, in eastern Syria near the Syrian–Iraqi border, while he and three other ISIL members were traveling in a vehicle coming from Raqqa. The raid ended in the deaths of 4 ISIL members including Ali. The U.S. Special Forces ordered him to exit the vehicle, intending to arrest him. When he refused and pulled out an assault rifle instead, U.S. forces fired at the vehicle, killing him and the other passengers on board. U.S. commandos also seized electronics and other documents during the operation for intelligence purposes.	
January 8, 2017	Al Kibar, Deir ez-Zor Governorate	On 8 January 2017, U.S. special forces reportedly from Delta carried out a "successful" raid in Syria against leaders of the ISIL group in the eastern province of Deir Ezzor. Delta inserted via helicopter and spent roughly 90 minutes on the ground near Deir al-Zour, before witnesses say they left carrying captured ISIL fighters and bodies. At least 25 ISIL fighters were killed during the raid and several were captured.	
March 21, 2017	Tabqa Dam, Raqqa Governorate	On the night of 21 March, an undisclosed number of U.S. special forces accompanying hundreds of Kurdish SDF fighters launched a large-scale heliborne assault on IS around the area of the Tabqa Dam with the eventual goal of taking the dam. They were inserted on the southern bank of the Euphrates river behind IS's defenses to take them by surprise. The following day, there was heavy fighting in the area; the ground forces were supported by helicopter gunships, U.S. artillery, and U.S. airstrikes. Fighting ensued within the area of the dam for another three weeks. On May 10, the SDF declared the dam fully secured.	
April 6, 2017	Near Mayadin, Deir ez-Zor Governorate	2 Coalition helicopters airdropped soldiers near Mayadin and targeted a car en route from Raqqa to Deir ez-Zor. During the landing, U.S. forces killed 4 ISIL commanders and extracted a Jordanian spy, who had infiltrated ISIL and served as one of its leaders.	
April 21, 2017	Deir ez-Zor Governorate	U.S. special forces killed Abdurakhmon Uzbeki, a top facilitator and close associate of ISIS leader who was connected to the New Year's nightclub attack in Turkey.	
October 26, 2019	300 meters outside Barisha, Harem District, Idlib Governorate	Main article: Death of Abu Bakr al-Baghdadi ~100 U.S. JSOC operatives conducted a heliborne raid, launching from western Iraq into the Idlib province on the border with Turkey to kill or capture Abu Bakr al-Baghdadi, the leader of ISIL. Baghdadi died by self-detonating a suicide vest after being chased by American military dogs and being cornered inside a tunnel, killing two of his sons alongside him. 5 other ISIL militants were killed during the raid, as were 10–15 militants of the Guardians of Religion Organization.	
May 17, 2020	Deir ez-Zor Governorate	U.S. special forces raided ISIL sites in Deir ez-Zor Governorate, in which Ahmad Isa Ismail al-Zawi known as Abu Ali al-Baghdadi, who was a former leader of operations in North Baghdad, blew himself up, and Ahmad Abd Muhammad Hasan al-Jughayfi known as Abu Ammar, a senior logistics and supply official, was killed in a shootout.	
February 3, 2022	Atme, Idlib Governorate	U.S. special forces undertook a counterterrorism operation in Atme, resulting in the death of the second ISIS caliph, Abu Ibrahim al-Hashimi al-Qurashi.	
June 16, 2022	Al-Humaira, Aleppo Governorate	U.S. special forces carried out a helicopter raid, including both Chinook and Black Hawk, in al-Humaira, south of the Turkish border in the Turkish occupied territory, in order to detain a senior ISIS leader Hani Ahmed Al-Kurdi, a bomb maker and facilitator, in addition to capturing nine other militants.	
December 11, 2022	eastern Syria	A U.S. helicopter raid killed an ISIS official, Anas, and his associate.	
December 20, 2022	eastern Syria	U.S. special forces accomplished three helicopter raids in 48 hours, in order to capture six ISIS operatives including "Al-Zubaydi".	
February 17, 2023	Deir ez-Zor Governorate, Syria	A U.S. helicopter raid, partnered with the Syrian Democratic Forces, killed Hamza al-Homsi, which resulted in four U.S. service members and one working dog wounded, according to a statement from U.S. Central Command.	
February 18, 2023	eastern Syria	A U.S. helicopter raid captured an ISIS province official called "Batar".	
April 8, 2023	eastern Syria	A U.S. helicopter raid captured an ISIS attack facilitator called "Hudayfah al Yemeni" and two of his associates.	
April 17, 2023	eastern Syria	A U.S. helicopter raid killed an ISIS senior leader called "Abd-al-Hadi Mahmud al-Haji Ali" and two other militants.	
September 25, 2023	northern Syria	A U.S. helicopter raid captured an ISIS senior leader called "Abu Halil al-Fad’ani".	

== See also ==
- List of United States attacks on Syria during the Syrian Civil War
