= Timeline of the Islamic State (2016) =

List of events in chronological order

This is a timeline of Islamic State-related incidents in 2016.

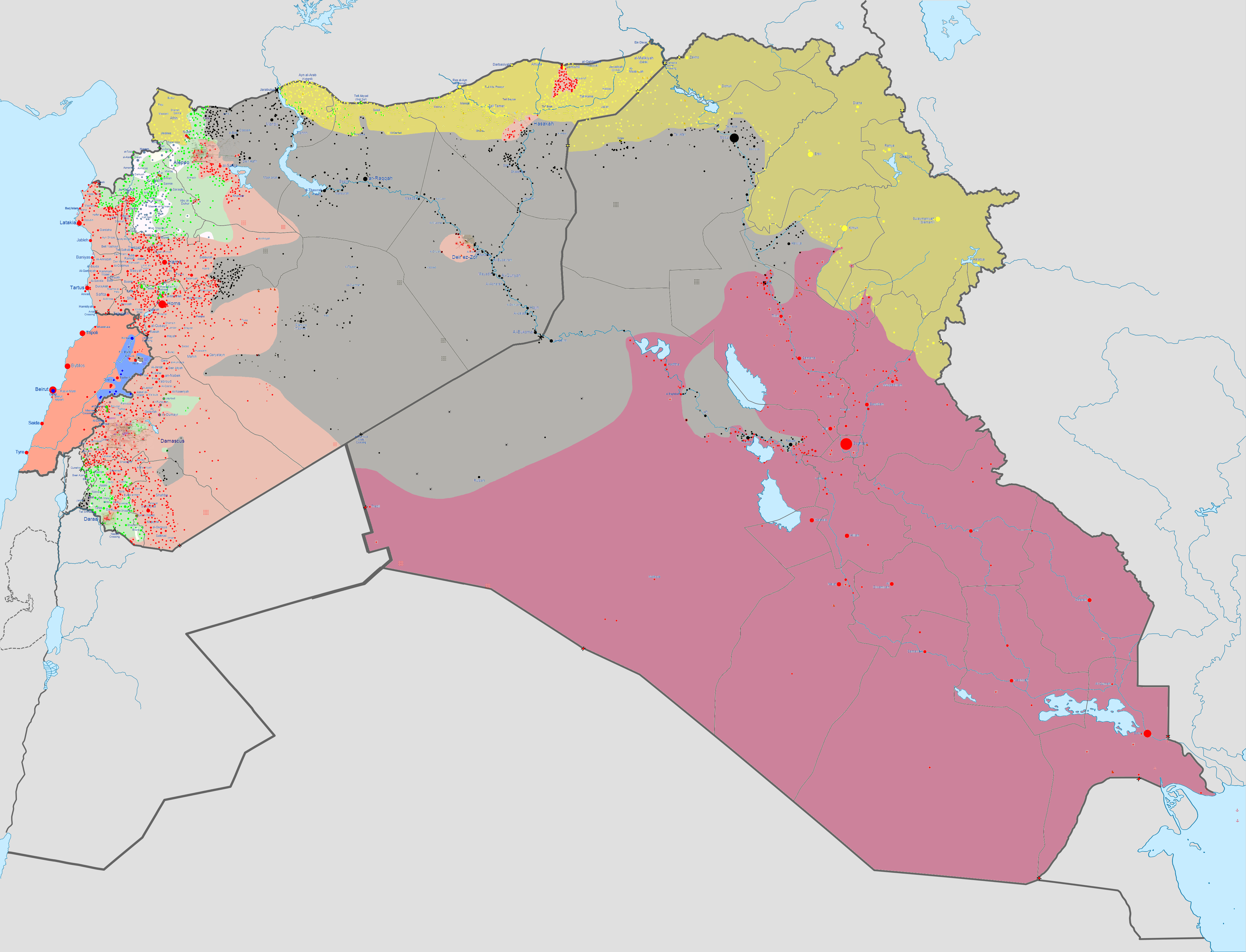
Map of the Levant (22 June 2015)

Northern Aleppo offensive (8 February 2016)

Boko Haram/IS Current military situation, as of 25 December 2015 Controlled by the Nigerian government Controlled by Boko Haram/IS

Libya current military situation (as of 6 January 2016) Controlled by the House of Representatives and Libyan National Army Controlled by the New General National Congress and Libya Shield Force Controlled by the Islamic State Controlled by the Benghazi, Derna and Ajdabiya Shura Councils Controlled by the Petroleum Facilities Guard (PFG) Controlled by Tuareg forces Controlled by local forces

Territory Changes 2014–2016

== Timeline ==
=== January 2016 ===
- 1 January IS fighters mount an attack on the newly recaptured Iraqi city of Ramadi using suicide bombers and VBIEDs. They are repelled by the Iraqi Army operating in conjunction with US-led Coalition air strikes.
- 1 January a lone attacker performed a terror attack in Tel Aviv, killing three and claiming allegiance to the Islamic State before he was hunted down by security forces.
- 2 January IS's Sinai Province claims responsibility for a rocket attack on the Israeli city of Sderot the preceding Friday.
- 3 January IS releases a video showing the execution of five Syrian men who they allege were British spies. In the video, a masked, British-accented militant, believed to be Siddhartha Dhar, taunts UK Prime Minister David Cameron before shooting the "spies" in the head. The footage later features one of the group's English-speaking child soldiers.
- 3 January Camp Speicher, an Iraqi military base, is attacked by multiple IS suicide and car bombers, with a death toll of at least 15 Iraqi military and police personnel.
- 4 January The Libyan oil depot town of Sidra is attacked by IS car bombers. Two militiamen guarding the port are killed, and a large oil tank is destroyed.
- 6 January Sky News releases pictures and videos shot inside an IS explosives research facility in Raqqa, the group's capital. The largely instructional media show militants recommissioning old heat-seeking missiles and experimenting with remote-controlled car bombs.
- 6 January In an online article, IS threatens to attack the Saudi Arabian prisons of al-Ha'ir and Tarfiya. The statement is believed to be in response to a mass execution of Islamist convicts the previous Saturday.
- 7 January Parisian police shoot dead a cleaver-wielding man as he attempts to enter a police station; an IS emblem is later found on his person. The incident coincides with the 1st anniversary of the Charlie Hebdo shooting.
- 7 January The Iraqi military claims that IS spokesman Abu Mohammad al-Adnani was severely wounded in an airstrike several days before.
- 7 January IS truck bombs a police training center in the Libyan city of Zliten, killing at least 65 and wounding over 100. The group claims responsibility for the attack several days later.
- 7 January IS gunmen attack a busload of Israeli tourists in Giza, Egypt. No casualties are reported.
- 8 January A Philadelphia, Pennsylvania man shoots and severely injures a policeman parked in a patrol car. Upon being arrested and questioned, he cites IS ideology as a motivation for his attack.
- 8 January US officials announce an overhaul of the nation's methods of countering IS propaganda. Efforts will be made to deliver localized messages more relevant to Muslim populations; English-language material will be discontinued. Additionally, a new counterterrorism task force based at the United States Department of Homeland Security is announced.
- 8 January A Raqqa-based IS fighter executes his mother in front of a large crowd. She reportedly disapproved of his allegiance to the group and urged him to leave, which prompted her arrest.
- 8 January A 24-year-old Palestinian American refugee is indicted on federal charges relating to IS. Prosecutors allege that he attempted to materially support the group, and also accuse him of lying about his affiliation during his naturalization.
- 8 January IS claims responsibility for the stabbing death of a Christian convert in Jhenaidah District, Bangladesh. Local police dispute elements of the group's claim.
- 9 January Two militants believed to belong to IS's Sinai Province storm a hotel in the Egyptian resort town of Hurghada. They stab and injure two foreign tourists before being neutralized by police.
- 9 January IS's Sinai Province claims responsibility for the killing of two Cairo policemen earlier that day. Both attackers, one a 21-year-old student, are subsequently shot dead by additional police.
- 10 January Three suspects in the murder of an anti-IS activist filmmaker are arrested in Gaziantep, Turkey.
- 10 January The Royal Air Force uses Brimstone missiles for the first time against Syrian IS targets.
- 11 January IS claims responsibility for two bombings near a casino in the Iraqi city of Miqdadiyah.
- 11 January IS attacks a shopping center in a Shiite neighborhood of Baghdad with a car bomb and gunmen. 18 casualties were reported.
- 11 January A 15-year-old Turkish citizen attacks and injures a Jewish teacher with a machete in the French city of Marseille. Prosecutors allege that he stated his actions were committed "in the name of Allah and the Islamic State".
- 12 January A Saudi-born IS suicide bomber detonates near the Blue Mosque in Istanbul, Turkey. 11 people, all foreigners, are killed, and 14 are injured.
- 13 January IS's Khorasan Province attacks the Pakistani consulate in Jalalabad, Afghanistan. 7 Afghan security personnel are killed, but no casualties or injuries are reported from within the consulate.
- 13 January Militants affiliated with the Islamic State – Khorasan Province attacked Pakistan's consulate in Jalalabad, Afghanistan, killing 9 people and injuring 12 more
- 14 January The United States Department of State officially designates IS's Khorasan Province as a Foreign Terrorist Organization. The designation imposes financial sanctions on the group.
- 14 January Turkish ground forces mount a major offensive against IS positions in retaliation for the earlier suicide bombing.
- 14 January IS gunmen and suicide bombers perpetrate the 2016 Jakarta attacks against various targets in Central Jakarta. In total, there were 4 civilian deaths and 24 injuries. 4 belligerents were killed and 3 others were captured by the police.
- 14 January IS forces briefly capture a Northern Iraqi Sunni village, but are quickly repelled by the Iraqi army.
- 16 January IS militants execute dozens of civilians and pro-Assad fighters in Deir ez-Zor, Syria. Over 400 civilians are reportedly abducted and taken towards Raqqa, IS's capital.
- 16 January Malaysian police announce the arrest of a local IS member who allegedly planned a suicide attack. He is also suspected of hanging IS flags in multiple Malaysian states.
- 16 January The FBI arrests two Woodbridge, Virginia men who allegedly planned to travel abroad to join IS.
- 18 January IS advances on Syrian regime forces in Deir ez-Zor Province, seeking to consolidate its control over the territory.
- 19 January IS announces significant pay cuts for its Syrian fighters. Militants' salaries will be reduced by half, though food allowances remain unaffected.
- 19 January Dabiq magazine publishes a eulogy for Jihadi John, confirming the high-profile IS member's death in a drone strike the previous November.
- 20 January Satellite photography is released that confirms IS's demolition of Dair Mar Elia, Iraq's oldest Christian monastery.
- 20 January Defense ministers of the anti-IS coalition's leading nations attend a planning conference in Paris, France, vowing to "accelerate and intensify" their military campaign against IS. In the meeting, the US asks its partners for greater amounts of special operations support.
- 20 January The Obama administration expands rules of engagement to help the US military more effectively combat IS's Afghan presence. The new guidelines permit broader use of airstrikes against suspected IS militants in Afghanistan.
- 21 January François Hollande, the President of France, pledges greater French support for anti-IS Arab and Kurdish forces.
- 22 January Two Luton men are convicted for their roles in a 2014 pro-IS leafleting campaign held on London's Oxford Street.
- 22 January Hafiz Saeed Khan, the emir of IS's Khorasan Province, claims in a Dabiq interview that Kashmiri militants have pledged allegiance to the group.
- 22 January The National Investigation Agency arrests 14 IS-linked militants across 4 Indian states.
- 22 January IS's Sinai Province claims responsibility for a 19 January explosion at a booby-trapped Cairo apartment building that killed 3 civilians and 7 police personnel. A Muslim Brotherhood-linked militant group makes a competing claim of responsibility.
- 23 January At a press conference in Istanbul, U.S. Vice President Joe Biden expresses confidence in joint US-Turkish military action against IS should upcoming peace talks with the Assad regime fail. His remarks are made after a meeting with Turkish Prime Minister Ahmet Davutoğlu; other topics discussed included joint support for Sunni Arab rebels.
- 23 January Russia and Syrian warplanes launch a wave of airstrikes on IS positions in Raqqa and Deir ez-Zor. Over 70 civilians are reportedly killed.
- 23 January The U.S.-led coalition performs 23 air strikes on IS positions across Syria and near Ramadi, Iraq. The strikes are focused on destroying the group's ammunitions and property, as well as denying militants access to tactically significant terrain.
- 23 January IS launched suicide attacks in the Kilo 70 area west of Ramadi, and in the Tal Msheheidah east of Ramadi, as well as areas to the north of Ramadi; the ensuing clashes and airstrikes led to the deaths of 62 IS militants and 48 Iraqi fighters.
- 23 January The Army launched a full attack west of Kuweires with the intention of linking up with government-held territory at the Sheikh Najjar Industrial District of Aleppo city.
- 24 January Malaysian police announce the arrest of 7 militants who allegedly belonged to a local IS cell. The men had reportedly received orders from IS in Syria to commit suicide bombings.
- 24 January IS releases a video featuring and eulogizing 9 of the 12 November 2015 Paris attackers. The footage depicts them executing several hostages, as well as threatening Western governments and civilians with similar attacks.
- 25 January In an eight-page report, Europol warns of likely attempts at Paris-style attacks elsewhere in Europe. The report speaks of IS's "willingness and […] capacity" to carry out subsequent mass-casualty attacks, and cites lone wolves and radicalization in the Syrian refugee diaspora as specific risk factors.
- 25 January A Malaysian IS affiliate group publishes a Malay-language video threatening attacks if recent police crackdowns on local IS elements continue.
- 25 January Turkish police arrest at least 10 Ankara-based IS recruiters.
- 25 January Police in Kigali, Rwanda's capital, shoot dead a suspected IS recruiter after he resists arrest.
- 25 January At a press conference in Dushanbe, Ramazon Khamroevich Rakhimov, Interior Minister of Tajikistan, claims that over 1,000 Tajik citizens have left to join IS.
- 25 January Iraqi security forces discover over 18 corpses at a mass gravesite in Ramadi. The bodies, some of which had been shot or beheaded, are believed to belong to police and civilians killed by IS in May 2015.
- 27 January A 20-year-old Kosovar citizen accused of pro-IS computer hacking makes his first appearance in a US federal court. He allegedly sent the personal information of over 1,300 US military personnel to an IS member, who then proceeded to post the list on Twitter.
- 28 January U.S. Defense Secretary Ash Carter informs a press conference that the US has already sent "a small number of military personnel" into Libya to reconnoiter and network with local security forces. Later that day, U.S. President Barack Obama directs his national security advisers to support indigenous counter-IS efforts in Libya.
- 28 January IS claims responsibility for a suicide car bombing at Yemeni President Abd Rabbuh Mansur Hadi's residence. The attacker, possibly a former Dutch resident, misses his intended target; 5 security personnel and 1 civilian are instead killed in the explosion.
- 28 January The US-led Coalition performs 20 airstrikes against IS's Syrian and Iraqi presences. The 15 Iraqi strikes were centered around Ramadi and involved the destruction of tactical units and IEDs; the 5 Syrian strikes focused on IS's construction infrastructure and additionally hit several of the group's local headquarters.
- 28 January The U.S. Pentagon recommends the deployment of additional advisers, trainers, and commandos to combat IS in Iraq and Syria. The additional personnel would work in a supportive role alongside Iraqi forces, Kurdish peshmerga, and the Syrian opposition.
- 28 January The 7th Republican Party presidential debate is held, with several candidates taking a characteristically bellicose tone on IS-related issues. Ted Cruz called for carpet bombing that would "utterly and completely destroy" the militant group; Marco Rubio advocated for the interrogation of future IS prisoners at the Guantanamo Bay detention camp.
- 28 January IS's Sinai Province claims responsibility for an attack on military personnel in Arish, North Sinai's capital. The attack killed 4, including a colonel, and wounded 12.
- 28 January IS suicide bombers targeted an Iraqi army division headquarters in the al-Thirthar area of Ramadi. Four were killed in Coalition airstrikes, but two attacked the main gate of the headquarters, killing 17 Iraqi soldiers, including seven officers, and wounding 46 soldiers. Separately, 15 Iraqi soldiers were killed, and 20 wounded elsewhere in the city in a combination of suicide attacks, sniper fire, and roadside bombs.
- 28 January IS conducted a counter-attack against the villages they lost in the previous days. The subsequent fighting left 20 soldiers and 14 militants dead. One of the main objectives during the military's assault was the Aleppo Thermal Power Plant.
- 28 January Vice Admiral Clive Johnstone, commander of NATO's Allied Maritime Command, warned that Islamic State militants hope to build a maritime arm that could carry out attacks in the Mediterranean Sea, against tourist and transfer ships.
- 29 January Jeanine Hennis-Plasschaert, the Dutch Minister of Defence, announces that the Netherlands will extend its anti-IS airstrikes into Syria. The decision comes after a Paris meeting with her US and French counterparts.
- 29 January Several suspects in the Metrojet Flight 9268 bombing are reportedly arrested. An IS-linked airplane mechanic is accused of planting an IED on board, and three other airport personnel are under investigation for allegedly facilitating him.
- 31 January Two IS suicide bombers perpetrate the 2016 Sayyidah Zaynab bombings. At least 60 are killed near the Sayyidah Zaynab Mosque in Damascus, one of Shia Islam's holiest sites. The attackers reportedly targeted a bus carrying Shi'ite militiamen.
- 31 January IS releases a video showing a French militant executing an alleged spy. The Francophone fighter threatens attacks that will make IS's adversaries "forget September 11 and Paris", while re-asserting IS territorial claims over the Iberian Peninsula.
- 31 January A prominent Australian IS member's death is reported. Neil Prakash, also known as Abu Khaled al-Cambodi, was involved in the group's online recruitment activities.

=== February 2016 ===
- 1 February US officials claim that the Obama administration's 2017 defense budget request will include a $7 billion increase to better fund the fight against IS.
- 1 February US Lieutenant General Sean MacFarland, Operation Inherent Resolve's commander, expresses confidence in the coalition's anti-IS campaign. He specifically cites the recapture of Ramadi as a "turning point".
- 1 February A 19-year-old Morganton, North Carolina resident is indicted on federal charges relating to alleged pro-IS activities. Prosecutors accuse him of plotting mass shootings to "show his support" for the militant group. He also faces murder charges in the shooting death of a 74-year-old neighbor.
- 1 February U.S. airstrikes in Nangarhar province, eastern Afghanistan, killing 29 IS fighters and struck the terrorist group's FM radio station.
- 2 February At a foreign ministers' conference in Rome, US Secretary of State John Kerry expresses concern over recent IS territorial gains in Libya. Calling the group "apostates" and "a false caliphate", he warns of possible IS capture of the country's oil reserves.
- 2 February A Canadian court issues a 10-month peace bond to a vocal IS sympathizer. The 23-year-old Winnipegger, who was previously interviewed by Canadian media about his beliefs, is barred from leaving the country and using social media.
- 2 February Around 300 IS fighters were estimated to be remaining in Ramadi's eastern Sajjariyah District, and in the nearby areas.
- 2 February An IS propaganda radio station in the eastern Afghan province of Nangarhar is destroyed by coalition airstrikes. The attack, which also involved Afghan ground troops, killed 29 militants.
- 3 February A combined force of Sunni Arab Popular Mobilization Forces units and local peshmerga recapture the Iraqi Kurdistani village of Kudila from IS. The militiamen are aided by coalition airstrikes.
- 3 February Russia's Defence Ministry announces the death of a Russian military adviser in Syria. The adviser, killed earlier that week, was reportedly hit by IS mortar fire.
- 3 February Israeli Major General Nitzan Alon reveals that his country has been sharing intelligence with the anti-IS coalition.
- 3 February In the evening government forces stormed the village of Tayyibah. Soon after IS reportedly started to withdraw from the village, while fighting still continued in Tayyibah. Meanwhile, government troops bypassed the plant due to dozens of improvised traps, mines and highly entrenched IS fighters in its vicinity.
- 3 February Government forces captured 11 villages west and northwest of the base and were 13 kilometers from Sheikh Najjar.
- 3 February The Tiger Forces along with the NDF, Desert Hawks Brigade and Ba'ath Brigades captured Al-Si'in. In the evening of 3 February, Syrian government forces stormed the village of Tayyibah. Soon afterwards, IS reportedly started to withdraw from the village, while fighting still continued in Tayyibah. Meanwhile, Syrian government troops bypassed the Aleppo Thermal Power Plant, due to dozens of improvised traps, mines, and highly entrenched IS fighters in its vicinity.
- 4 February German police arrest two suspected IS affiliates in raids across Berlin. The men were allegedly plotting attacks against various public places in the city.
- 6 February A federal criminal complaint against a Dearborn Heights, Michigan man is unsealed. The 21-year-old, detained on weapons and drug charges, allegedly threatened to "shoot up" a Detroit church in an IS-inspired plot.
- 6 February An Australian man is deported from India after Indira Gandhi International Airport security personnel reportedly find pro-IS material on his laptop.
- 7 February IS recaptured two villages, while government forces captured another village and a hill, bringing them to within 7 kilometers of Sheikh Najjar and closing the IS pocket. An attempted IS counter-attack against the hill left 11 militants dead.
- 7 February A second member of the Beatles is identified. The militant, a 32-year-old Ghanaian-British convert to Islam, was dubbed "Ringo" by his captives.
- 7 February The United Arab Emirates' Minister of State for Foreign Affairs expresses his country's readiness to deploy ground troops to the anti-IS campaign. He indicates that such deployments will be limited in size and suggests that UAE troops will focus on training and support roles.
- 7 February Spanish police arrest a group of 7 alleged IS affiliates across Ceuta. The suspects are believed to have provided "logistical support" for IS activities elsewhere. Additionally, the group's leader was reportedly tasked with procuring comfort women for militants.
- 7 February During a security operation al-Sofiyah District in eastern Ramadi, a booby-trapped house killed 6 Iraqi soldiers and wounded 5 others.
- 8 February Umm Sayyaf, widow of deceased IS commander Abu Sayyaf, is charged by US federal authorities with providing material support to a foreign terrorist organization that resulted in a person's death. She was allegedly complicit in the rape and death of Kayla Mueller, a captured American aid worker.
- 9 February Iraqi forces fully recapture Ramadi from IS after months of fighting, destroying thousands of buildings and forcing nearly all residents to flee. Afterwards, the Iraqi Government reopened the Ramadi-Habbaniyah Highway. IS militants were still holed up in some farmlands in Khalidiya Island, to the north of the town of Al Khalidiya.
- 10 February From July 2015 through early February 2016, the United States and other nations conducted 813+ airstrikes in the Ramadi area. It is also the 100th battle that has erupted in Ramadi since 2003. In February 2016, it was predicted that it would take several months to clear Ramadi city of the bombs IS left behind, with at least 9 months needed to clear Ramadi's Tamim District. At the time, Ramadi had suffered more damage than any other city or town in Iraq. With 80% of Ramadi left in ruins after months of heavy bombing, as well as scorched earth tactics employed by IS, the US and its allies allocated over $50 million to rebuild the city.
- 10 February 9 more Iraqi soldiers from the army's 8th Division were killed by IS shelling, in the Sajjariyah District.
- 11 February ABC news reported the U.S. military had carried out 20 airstrikes on IS in eastern Afghanistan in the previous 3 weeks.
- 13 February The Syrian Army recaptured Jubb al Kalb village, less than one week after losing it to an IS counter-attack. The following day, the military captured four villages, including Tayyibah (300 meters from the Power Plant) and Barlehiyah (7 kilometers from government-held territory to the west).
- 16 February The military captured the Power Plant and two days later seized Al-Siin once again while surrounding IS at the Aleppo Thermal Plant.
- 17 February A car bomb near military buses in Ankara killed 28 and wounded dozens, and the TAK claimed responsibility.
- 18 February The Syrian Army seized Al-Siin once again, as well as Jubb Al-Ghabishah.
- 18 February Adel al-Jubeir, the Minister of Foreign Affairs of the Kingdom of Saudi Arabia, announced that a US-led ground operation in Syria would focus on fighting IS, not the Syrian regime.
- 18 February A large number of local Sunni tribesmen revolted against IS, after IS beat a woman, among other restrictive practices enforces by IS's Al-Hisbah secret police, amid an ongoing siege. IS was reported to have withdrawn into Fallujah city, after local Sunnis burned the Al-Hisbah headquarters and clashes spread.
- 19 February A US air raid on suspected IS camp resulted in killing 49 people, including two Serbian embassy members, who had been taken hostage by the militants.
- 20 February The Syrian Army, backed by the National Defence Force, captured the Aleppo Thermal Power Plant and imposed "full control" over the facility. 30 IS militants were killed and four of their armored vehicles were destroyed during the battle. Tiger Forces, National Defense Forces and Suqur al-Sahara then captured the village of Balat and its surrounding farms. In the same day, Suqur al-Sahara and the Cheetah Forces Team 3 captured the village of Turaykiyah, fully besieging the pocket of 800 IS fighters in east Aleppo, with their only options being to surrender or be killed.
- 20 February It was estimated that only 1,000 civilians were living in and around the Ramadi area, after the fierce clashes that erupted during the battle for the city.
- 20 February The clashes began to die down as IS began carrying out mass arrests, and it was reported that there were still some Sunni fighters who were pinned down in parts of Fallujah, who would likely be massacred if the Iraqi Government or the US-led Coalition does not intervene.
- 20 February A U.S. Air Force MQ-9 Reaper crashed at Kandahar airfield.
- 21 February At least 46 people were killed and several injured in a double car bombs explosion in the city of Homs. At least 30 people were killed in several bomb blasts near Damascus.
- 21 February At least 30 people were killed in several bomb blasts near Damascus. Both incidents were masterminded by IS.
- 21 February The last pockets of resistance were overcome, with pro-government forces in possession of all the towns and villages in the Al-Safira plains. It was reported that 700 of the IS militants had escaped the encirclement during the previous week as the government forces skirted around their northern flank, leaving 100–150 remaining fighters who were trapped. 20 villages were seized over the previous 24 hours and 40 kilometers of highway were cleared, putting an end to the 3-month offensive. In addition, 50 IS fighters were killed during the previous 24 hours.
- 21 February In Benghazi the Libyan National Army also managed to take over the rest of Bouatni, while overrunning Hawari and Leithi districts both of which were strongholds of IS & Ansar al-Sharia.
- 21 February At 10 p.m. an offensive was launched by IS. By the next day, a joint attack by militants from both IS and Al-Qaeda-linked Jund al-Aqsa captured the village of Rasm Al-Nafal, as well as two other points along the Khanasir-Aleppo Road, cutting the Syrian government's only supply route to Aleppo city. The jihadists then proceeded to additionally seize six other villages and a hill. A convoy of reinforcements from the town of As-Safira, consisting of the pro-government Palestinian militia Liwa Al-Quds was sent to reopen the road and by the end of the day they had recaptured the hill.
- 22 February United States and Russia agree an all party ceasefire that will exclude the IS and the al-Qaeda-linked Nusra Front begin on 27 February.
- 22 February Afghan forces and U.S.-led coalition airstrikes kill a total 43 Islamic State militants in Nangarhar Province during a military operation against IS in that region.
- 23 February Jund al-Aqsa and the Free Syrian Army captured the village of Rasm al-Nafal, to the southwest of Lake Jabbul, severing the Ithriyah-Khanasser Highway again for the second time in 5 months. In a coordinated action, IS had also captured multiple villages along the southern shore of Lake Jabbul and to the south of Rasm al-Nafal, sealing off more of the Aleppo road and Sheikh Hilal-Ithriyah Road. Counter-attacks by Syrian Arab Army have failed to immediately dislodge militants from the majority of the captured positions.
- 23 February IS militants clashed with forces associated with the Sabratha military council inside of Sabratha. These clashes were followed on the same day by an IS offensive that allegedly temporarily seized various buildings after penetrating the city. However, local forces conducted a counterattack against the IS militants, reportedly driving them out of the city's centre. However, fighting continued in Zawagha district.
- 23 February Two contingents of the Syrian Army's special forces unit known as the Tiger Forces were also sent to help in reestablishing control of the road. Meanwhile, IS launched an assault on the town of Khanasir, which began with a failed suicide car-bomb attack against a checkpoint in its outskirts. Throughout the morning, the military recaptured four out of seven positions they had lost on the road, but ultimately IS managed to capture Khanasir. In the afternoon, the Tiger Forces launched a general counteroffensive with a missile barrage, followed by a tank assault. The Syrian Army waited before entering the villages IS had captured, until Russian airstrikes had dissipated. The counterattack was launched from two flanks, with the Tiger Forces and Hezbollah assaulting Rasm Al-Nafal from the north, while the Army and the Liwaa Al-Quds Brigade advanced from the south towards Khanasir. By the evening, government forces recaptured Tal SyriaTel hill, outside Khanasir, and Rasm Al-Nafal.
- 24 February In the morning, the Syrian Army re-entered Khanasir and one other village. Later, they managed to seize Tal Za'rour hill, while also advancing to the central district of Khanasir. At this time, the cutting of the road by IS caused prices of food and medical supplies in Aleppo city to raise dramatically. On 25 February, the Tiger Forces and their allies recaptured Khanasir, while several hills outside the town were still IS-held. The Army then advanced north of Khanasir and captured the nearby village of Al-Mughayrat, along with four hilltops north of it (including the large Talat Al-Bayda hill). At the same time, government forces advancing from the north seized Shilallah al-Kabeera, which they breached the previous day with the help of Russian airstrikes. By the end of the day, government troops reached two more villages and started preparing for a new assault on the next morning.
- 24 February A Coalition airstrike killed 30 IS militants in the Karama Sub-district, just east of Fallujah.
- 25 February In the aftermath of the combined rebel and IS breakthrough south of Lake Jabbul, Syrian Arab Army has launched a large-scale counter-attack, dislodging IS from the town of Khanasir, captured by militants 2 days before.
- 25 February Boko Haram/IS fighters are crossing Africa to receive specialized training from Al Shabaab fighters in Somalia, the country's national security chief told the press.
- 26 February Early on the Syrian Army made more advances, recapturing three villages. The advances nearly besieged IS forces in a pocket of villages southwest of Lake Jabbul. Later in the day, the Syrian Army captured the remaining four villages that IS held, thus clearing the road to Aleppo. However, elsewhere, IS took control of a village near al-Hamam Mountain, that overlooks the supply road. Syrian Government forces reportedly re-secured the village the following day.
- 28 February Iraqi government forces repelled a massive IS suicide attack in Abu Ghraib and western Baghdad, which was the largest attack carried out by the group in the area in nearly 2 years. The assault left 30 IS militants and 30 Iraqi soldiers dead.
- 28 February The Syrian Army captured the strategic village of Abu Al-Karouz, near Khanasir. Later on the same day, the Syrian Army completely re-secured the Hama-Aleppo supply route, after capturing the last point on the Sheikh Hilal-Ithriya Highway that was held by IS.

=== March 2016 ===
- 2 March Militants attacked the Indian consulate in Jalalabad, 5 militants were killed and 9 people were injured.
- 6 March The Nangarhar Offensive ended; Afghanistan's President Ashraf Ghani announced in the Afghan parliament that the Islamic State has been defeated in the eastern parts of the country. Also that day, a U.S. Drone strike in Nangarhar killed 15 IS militants.
- Between 10 and 14 March Rebel forces seized three villages, including Dudyan.
- 13 March A car bomb at Ankara transport hub killed 37, and the TAK claimed responsibility.
- 16 March Militants loyal to IS-K attacked an Afghan police checkpoint in Nangarhar province, killing and wounding 6 policemen.
- 17 March The IS recaptured Dudyan, but lost it again the next day.
- 19 March Rebel forces captured two villages, Toqli and Mregel, north of Aleppo from IS.
- 19 March An Islamic State member suicide bomber killed 4 on Istanbul’s Istiklal Street, including 3 Israelis and 1 Iranian.
- 22 March IS claims responsibility for two bomb attacks in Brussels, Belgium that left at least 31 dead and more than 220 injured. The attacks occurred at Zaventem Airport (at least 10 dead and 100 wounded) and at Maelbeek metro station (at least 20 dead and 130 wounded) near EU buildings.
- 27 March Syrian Armed Forces, backed by the Russian Air Force and allied militias, recaptured Palmyra from IS.

=== April 2016 ===
- Early April A 36-hour mission took place in Kot district in Nangarhar province involving unilateral U.S. strikes against IS targets which enabled Afghan special operations forces to move into the district and clear part of a valley.
- 1 April IS launched an offensive toward the Levant Front headquarters in the outskirts of Mregel. The attack was repelled by the Sham Legion and the Falcons of Mount Zawiya Brigade and an IS bulldozer was destroyed. The rebels than proceeded to capture two villages. Two days later, the al-Moutasem Brigade, the Sultan Murad Brigade, and the Sham Legion launched an offensive toward the IS stronghold of al-Rai to the east, capturing eight villages and reached within four kilometers from al-Rai by 4 April. Some of the villages that were seized were: Tal Sha'er, Raqbya, Qantra and Shaabanya. As of 5 April, the rebels had captured at least 16 villages in the area.
- 3 April The Syrian Army regained control of Al-Qaryatayn from IS.
- 6 April 39 IS militants are killed, including their Commander Qari Yusif, and 15 others are wounded in clashes with Afghan forces in Nangarhar province.
- 7 April With close air support from A-10 Thunderbolt IIs, the rebels captured most of al-Rai and the nearby border crossing. As of 8 April, the rebels had full control of al-Rai, along with 17 other villages.
- 8 April – An almost 10-hour long intense firefight happened in Tipo-Tipo, Basilan. Eighteen soldiers were killed while 52 government troops were wounded. Five Abu Sayyaf fighters were also killed in the encounter, including one foreign terrorist – a Moroccan national identified as Mohammad Khattad.
- Between 9 and 10 March Government forces captured 13 villages previously held by IS, near the southern bank of Lake Jabbūl, forcing IS to set up a new defensive line east of the lake.
- 10 April IS launched a counter-attack, which included a three-pronged attack against the town of Mare', and quickly recaptured eight villages. Still, the rebels once again seized four of the villages several hours later. During the day, the international Coalition conducted at least 22 air-strikes on IS positions as ground fighting continued. On 11 April, IS continued with its counter-attack and retook al-Rai and four other villages. In all, IS had recaptured in the previous two days, beside al-Rai, 17 other villages. The IS counter-offensive included attacks by 11 suicide car-bombers against rebel positions. At the end of the day, the rebels managed once again to retake control of eight villages.
- 12 April IS was reportedly in control of 13 localities they had previously lost, including al-Rai.
- 13 April The rebels managed to retake three villages once again. However, on 14 April, IS seized 10 new villages, practically cutting rebel forces in two. Rebels in the town of Dudyan were effectively surrounded. The most important village that IS captured was Hiwar Kallis, about one kilometer south of the Turkish border. During the IS advance, hundreds of rebel fighters retreated across the border into Turkey. By the following day, the rebels re-secured five villages, including Hiwar Kallis, reconnecting the two rebel areas.
- 14 April IS launched another offensive on Khanasir, and by the following day they captured hills near the town, the Duraham Oil Field and 10 villages. They also seized a large cache of weapons, ammunition and several armored vehicles. On 16 April, Syrian Army reinforcements were sent to the area, and by the evening they recaptured all of the territory lost, except the oil field.
- 15 April – Two Indonesian tugboats from Cebu, namely Henry and Cristi with 10 passengers were attacked by Abu Sayyaf militants. Four passengers were kidnapped, while another five were safe. One of the passenger was injured after being shot but were later rescued by Malaysian Maritime Enforcement Agency when they arrived into the waters of Malaysia.
- Between 15 and 16 April The back-and-forth fighting continued, with IS once again taking control of two villages, while the rebels took two others. On 17 April, IS again captured the village of Tall Battal, west of Al-Rai. Four days after IS regained most of the villages it had lost, the rebels launched a new assault and once again retook two villages. However, IS retook them the following day.

=== May 2016 ===
- 3 May A U.S. Navy SEAL was killed in Iraq after IS attacked a Peshmerga base. Roughly 100 IS fighters broke through a front line checkpoint and drove 3 to 5 kilometers to the Peshmerga base. The U.S. responded with F-16s and drones that dropped more than 20 bombs.
- 6 May Abu Waheeb was killed along with four companions by a US airstrike on an IS gathering in the center of Rutba. He was described as the IS "military emir for Anbar".
- 12 May British special forces blew up an IS suicide truck in Misrata. The British fired a missile after a vehicle, acting as a bomb, approached a bridge leading towards the city.
- Between 16 and 18 May The Iraqi army launched an offensive to recapture Ar-Rutbah from IS. The town was recaptured on 18 May.
- 23 May Iraq's prime minister Haider al-Abadi announced the beginning of military operations to retake the city of Fallujah.
- 26 May Iraqi forces and supporting militias have retaken the town of Karma from the IS as part of the Fallujah offensive.
- 31 May Syrian Democratic Forces allied with Arab fighters and backed by the International Coalition led by the US launched an offensive on IS held Manbij in northern Syria.

=== June 2016 ===
- 8 June The June 2016 Tel Aviv shooting occurred in Tel Aviv, Israel, as two Palestinian gunmen opened fire on patrons at the Max Brenner Cafe in the Sarona Market of Tel Aviv, killing four people and injuring seven others. According to an official indictment filed by the Tel Aviv District Prosecutor's Office the perpetrators were inspired by the Islamic State group.
- 25 June Two IS senior military commanders, Basim Muhammad Ahmad Sultan al-Bajari, IS' deputy minister of war, and Hatim Talib al-Hamduni, a military commander in Northern Iraq die in a U.S. airstrike near Mosul.
- 26 June The city of Fallujah is declared "fully liberated" by a senior Iraqi commander.
- 28 June A triple IS suicide bombing at Istanbul airport killed 45 and wounded over 160.

=== July 2016 ===
- 1 July Seven militants storm the Holey Artisan Bakery in Gulshan, Dhaka, Bangladesh taking hostages including foreigners. Twenty-eight people are killed, including 20 hostages (17 of them foreigners), two Bangladeshi police officers, and six gunmen.
- 3 July IS detonates a suicide truck bomb in Baghdad, killing nearly 300 in Iraq’s deadliest attack since 2003.
- 5 July Some militants attack a bar in Puchong, Malaysia using a hand grenade which is the first attack in Malaysia. 8 people were injured during the attack. IS also released a video of declaring war on Malaysia and Indonesia.
- 9 July Iraqi forces, with the help of US-lead coalition air cover, take the strategically important Qayyarah Airfield West 40 miles (60 km) South of Mosul. They reported no resistance from IS.
- 13 July The IS confirmed that Omar al-Shishani, one of the top military commanders of IS was killed. However, they claim that he was killed in Mosul contrary to earlier reports that he died in Syria.
- 14 July A 19 tonne cargo truck was deliberately driven into crowds of people celebrating Bastille Day on the Promenade des Anglais in Nice, France, resulting in the deaths of 86 people. IS claimed responsibility.
- 23 July At least 80 people were killed and more than 230 are injured after two IS militants conducted suicide bombings during a protest in Kabul, Afghanistan.
- 26 July A hostage taking incident by two individuals, who were later killed by police, at the Église St.-Étienne, a 17th-century Catholic church in Saint-Etienne-du-Rouvray, during the Holy Mass, leaves the priest dead and another hostage very critically injured. The attack was done in the name of IS, and an IS news channel claimed they were its "soldiers", similar to what happened after other recent European attacks, but there is no independent confirmation, or firm evidence, as of yet that they were directly linked to IS.

=== August 2016 ===
- 12 August The Syrian Democratic Force, led by the Kurdish YPG, capture Manbij, Syria. Manbij was strategically important as it was on the IS supply route from the Turkish border to the de facto IS capital of Raqqa. A large amount of intelligence material was discovered in Manbij including IS plans to attack targets in Europe, such as France.
- 20 August A suicide bomber attacked a wedding party in Gaziantep, killing 51, as links to the Islamic State were confirmed.
- 24 August The IS launched a new assault on the eastern countryside of Aleppo Governorate, targeting the SAA's defenses just north of the Kuweires Military Airport.
- 24 August Turkish troops and militia backed by US air strikes captured the Syrian border town of Jarablus in 24 hours. Turkish sources reported that they had secured the last remaining 91 km stretch of IS occupied Syrian border region next to the Turkish border between Azaz and Jarablus.
- 26 August A suicide truck bombing took place at a police HQ in southeastern Turkey. It killed 11 and wounded dozens. The PKK claimed responsibility.
- 30 August Abu Mohammad al-Adnani nom de guerre of Taha Subhi Falaha, the Syrian-born official spokesperson and a senior leader of IS is reported killed in Aleppo Governorate.

=== October 2016 ===
- 9 October The BBC reported that IS had lost more than 25% of its territory in Syria and Iraq since January 2015. However the rate of loss of territory had slowed in the three months to October because Russia had reduced its air strikes on IS and concentrated on supporting the Assad regime.
- 16 October Turkish-backed rebels claimed they had captured the symbolically important town of Dabiq. They said "IS members withdrew."
- 17 October Iraqi PM Haider al-Abadi announces the operation to liberate Mosul from IS.
- 21 October Iraqi Government forces reported they had retaken two more villages South of Mosul – Nanaha and al-Awaizat – killing 15 IS fighters.
- 21 October Islamic State executed hundreds of men and boys in Mosul, in the midst of a major offensive by Iraqi forces to recapture the city
- 21 October IS militants launch suicide attacks in Kirkuk, killing 80 to distract from Mosul.
- 24 October According to Christian humanitarian organization Roads of Success, testimony from survivors indicates Islamic State killed at least six adults by burning them alive in ovens and 250 children by kneading them in a giant dough mixer. At least one child was allegedly killed for refusing to renounce his Christian name.

=== November 2016 ===
- 2 November On 2 November, GNA forces gained a new foothold in the last IS-controlled area of the city and advanced further on 6 November. During the fighting, the GNA freed 14 civilians, while a senior GNA commander was killed.
- 3 November The Islamic State militants shoot dead 52 people in a public school located in the east of the city of Mosul, a day after Iraqi troops entered the city on the eastern front.
- 5 November The US-backed, Kurdish-led Syrian Democratic Forces launch Operation Euphrates Wrath, the first of five operations to retake Raqqa, beginning with an encirclement of the city.
- 6 November Between 6 and 14 November 2016, the rebels captured 36 villages, putting them within 2 kilometers of al-Bab. Meanwhile, the Syrian Democratic Forces captured 7 villages east of al-Bab in an attempt to besiege the village of Arima.
- Suicide bombers have used explosives-laden ambulances to kill at least 21 people and wound many others in the Iraqi cities of Tikrit and Samarra.
- On 6 November, the United Nations High Commissioner for Refugees (UNHCR) stated that 33,996 people had been displaced from the Mosul District. 63 percent of families are missing civil documentation and 21 percent of families are headed by a female. The previous 48 hours saw a 53 percent increase in displacement. The following day, WHO announced it had established 82 "rapid response teams" to prepare for possible concerns among civilians fleeing Mosul, including health epidemics such as cholera, and exposure to chemicals. A particular concern is potential disease outbreaks young children who have not been immunized since ISIL took over the city in June 2014.
- On the southwest front, Iraqi forces reported they are 4 from Mosul International Airport after taking control of Hamam al-Alil the previous day. Iraqi forces stormed the Al-Sada district, their first entrance into northern Mosul.
- Blogger Mosul Eye reported panic and despair inside the city from citizens fearing imminent death from either the Iraqi forces or IS, which had begun installing bombs around residential buildings. He wrote, "ISIL is trapping the houses around us with bombs. We live on ticking bombs around us! If airstrikes and gunfire don't kill us, those car bombs will soon do the job!"
- The Iraq War Media Office announced that Abu Hamza al-Ansari, a key IS leader from Algeria, was killed in southern Mosul during a fight with the Iraqi Army's 15th Division.
- A Kurdish official told Rudaw that in eastern Mosul, civilians have staged uprisings against IS, killing three: "The situation in Mosul is bad. Residents have risen against IS at the Nabi Younis and Bakir neighborhoods, killing three militants and forcing 111 families associated with them to flee to Syria," Saed Mamuzini said.
- 7 November On 7 November, the Iraqi War Media Office announced that the decapitated bodies of 100 civilians were found in Hamam al-Alil. "Inside the building of the Faculty of Agriculture there is a new crime: the presence of 100 beheaded bodies of citizens killed by terrorists, and a special team will be sent to inspect this heinous crime," the office said in a statement.
- Rudaw reported that Peshmerga fighters launched a massive offensive in the morning to take the town of Bashiqa, still held by IS. Peshmerga have surrounded the town for two weeks. There were believed to be 100 to 200 IS militants left in Bashiqa, the last major IS-held town in area controlled by the Kurdistan Regional Government. Commander Kaka Hama said the Peshmerga descended from three fronts, and that coalition airstrikes played a large role in the assault. In the early afternoon, Rudaw reported that Bashiqa was liberated and that the Peshmerga were in full control.
- On the southern front, Agence France-Presse reported that Hamam al-Alil, which had been reported to be under Iraqi control on 5 November, had been fully liberated Monday by a combination of Iraqi, federal police and elite interior ministry forces.
- Al Sumaria reported that IS beheaded seven of its own militants for "delinquency" in a public square in central Mosul.
- 8 November Shooting left 30 people dead in Nigeria.
- The Peshmerga killed 12 IS fighters trying to flee the recently liberated town of Bashiqa. IS members returning to captured towns via tunnels and staging ambushes remains a high concern, Brig. Gen. Musa Gardi told Rudaw.
- Further to the West, PMU forces were reported to have advanced to a distance of 25 km towards strategically important Tal Afar military air base, south of the city. CJTF–OIR reported an airstrike engaging an IS headquarters building near Tal Afar for that day.
- Hamam al-Alil massacre: Islamic State killed at least 300 civilians in retaliation against individuals that refused to fight for IS.
- Gunmen have killed more than 30 gold miners in a remote area of northern Nigeria. Boko Haram (suspected)
- At least five Nigerien soldiers were killed and three others injured in a terrorist attack
- Two civilians were killed, three soldiers injured and 100 houses were set on fire when Boko Haram fighters raided a village.
- 9 November On 9 November, after more advances by the GNA, only a few IS snipers were estimated to be left in the area still under their control.
- 4 people have died and 6 others injured after 2 suicide bombers exploded improvised explosive device.
- At least seven civilians were killed in an explosion in Kandahar Province.
- 11 November On 11 November, video emerged of the Iraqi army apparently torturing and murdering an Iraqi child. The boy, identified as Muhammad Ali Al-Hadidi, was dragged through the desert and shot dead before a tank was driven over him. The men in the video were identified as Shia and yelled sectarian slurs at the child, a Sunni. The video caused extreme outrage on social media, with Arabic speakers using the hashtag #CrushedByATank (Arabic: #السحق_بالدبابة). The soldiers were wearing the insignia of the Iraqi Special Forces.
- Islamic State has executed 40 civilians in Mosul. Islamic State has also announced it has beheaded six of its own fighters for deserting the battlefield. The Islamic State shot dead 40 civilians before crucifying them for "treason", and killed 20 more for "leaking information". They also shot dead a man for using a mobile phone, and hanged six civilians for "keeping hidden SIM cards".
- Abu Sayyaf hijacked a Vietnamese cargo ship and abducted six crew.
- 12 November At least 15 fighters from the Syrian Democratic Forces, were killed on Saturday in two Islamic State attacks in Aleppo and al-Raqqa in Syria. Another seven SDF fighters were killed during combats in the Khenez area, north of al-Raqqa, where IS jihadists launched a counter-attack after losing territory.
- 2016 Khuzdar bombing: At least 55 people including women and children have been killed and above 100 injured when a suicide bomber went off in the crowded Shah Noorani Shrine in Hub town, Lasbela District, Balochistan, Pakistan.
- Islamic State executed 60 civilians.
- 14 November On 14 November, rebel forces managed to enter the northern outskirts of al-Bab, but were facing stiff resistance, with fighting raging at a livestock market two kilometers north of the town. By this point, al-Bab was surrounded from the north and northwest, with the only retreat route remaining for IS to the southeast towards Raqqa, through the IS-held town of Dayr Hafir. In the evening, the rebels established fire control over the Jafirah Roundabout and seized several adjacent buildings in the northern part of al-Bab, leaving them in control of less than 5 percent of the city. However, the next day, the rebels were forced to withdraw one kilometer to the north of al-Bab. Meanwhile, the rebels took control of the town of Qabasin, northeast of al-Bab.
- The so-called Islamic State alleged on Monday morning that their forces shot down a U.S. attack helicopter in the Marghab District.
- Three suicide bombers detonated their explosives inside the 'Ayn Al-Tamr area of Karbala City on Monday, killing as many as six people.
- An Islamic State suicide bomber killed 8 people in Baghdad. 6 people were injured in the attack.
- 15 November Two car bombings killed 8 people in Falluja. 20 people were injured.
- Islamic State has summarily killed 21 civilians in Mosul it accused of collaborating with U.S.-backed security forces.
- 16 November Islamic State has summarily killed 21 civilians in Mosul it accused of collaborating with U.S.-backed security forces.
- One other soldier died and eight others were injured in the Boko Haram ambush that led to the death of B.U. Umar, a lieutenant colonel.
- On 16 November, fourteen civilians were killed by IS in the al-Zahraa neighborhood under government control.
- PMF meanwhile took control of Tal Afar military airbase west of the city Mosul, killing a large number of IS fighters in the process.
- 18 November At least 40 people were killed and more than 60 wounded after a suicide car bomb attack targeted a police officer's wedding in Amiriyat al-Fallujah in Iraq.
- On 18 November, in the West, PMF were securing and clearing Tal Afar military airbase, which they had captured from IS two days earlier, and preparing the assault on the city proper. In the vicinity, they were attacking further villages, in an area infamous for Sunni Islamist militancy and outstanding support for IS among the population.
- 19 November Islamic State killed seven Sunni tribal fighters who support the Iraqi government and five policemen on Saturday in a town south of Mosul.
- Five members of the Shia Hashd al-Shaabi militia were killed in a Daesh ambush Saturday in northern Iraq, according to a military officer.
- 20 November A Turkish soldier was killed and two others wounded in a bomb attack by Islamic State militants near the northern Syrian city of al-Bab.
- To the West, Iraqi army troops arrived on the outskirts of Tal Afar to reinforce PMF and were preparing to retake the town.
- By this point, IS territory in the city had been reduced to just one square kilometer. About 400 IS militants, who had managed to escape Sirte since the beginning of the offensive, were conducting guerrilla attacks behind the frontline.
- 3 GNA fighters were killed in an IS counter-attack on 20 November.
- 21 November- IS militants carried out a suicide attack on Baqir ul-Uloom mosque in Kabul, that was crowded with Shias – more than 30 people were killed and dozens wounded.
- On 21 November, the SDF captured two more villages, while IS launched a counter-attack near Tal Saman. Over the next days, the SDF attempted to further advance, such as at al-Qalita, but was unable to break through IS's defense line south of Tal Saman.
- GNA advanced further on 21 November, capturing a fortified school. They seized a number of barricaded houses on the next day. 37 IS fighters were killed in clashes on 21 and 22 November, while 14 were arrested. GNA also lost 8 fighters. The United States also resumed its airstrikes on IS at this point. Advancing GNA fighters were delayed by booby traps and mines. Some GNA units had to be pulled back from the narrow frontline and were reserved for relieving other fighters.
- At least six people, including a soldier were killed and 20 others were injured in a spate of attacks across Baghdad on Sunday. Iraqi Lt. Hatim al-Jabouri told Anadolu Agency a bomb attack in southeast Baghdad targeted a patrol vehicle, killing a soldier and injuring four others. In another attack in a central neighborhood in Baghdad, three civilians were killed and seven others were injured, al-Jabouri said. In a bomb attack close to a market area in Yusufiyye town in Baghdad, two people were killed and nine others were injured. There was no claim of responsibility for Wednesday's violence, but the Iraqi authorities typically blame such attacks on the Daesh terrorist group.
- A car bomb killed 3 children and 20 others people were injured. The attack occurred in Benghazi.
- 22 November Iraqi troops moved on Tuesday to retake another neighborhood in the eastern sector of the northern city of Mosul but were facing stiff resistance from Islamic State militants, according to a top Iraqi commander.
- A bomb killed one and another 3 were wounded. The attack occurred in Chaman.
- By 22 November, only 50 militants were remaining in a few dozen properties still controlled by IS.
- Between 22 and 23 November, Qabasin changed hands two more times, ultimately remaining under IS control. On 23 November, the SDF captured Arima. In response, Turkish artillery shelled the SDF-held villages in the area.
- Brig. Gen. Haider Fadel of the special forces told The Associated Press that IS fighters were targeting his forces with rockets and mortars as they slowly advanced in the densely populated Zohour neighborhood. "We are cautiously advancing. There are too many civilians still living there," he said.
- "A US airstrike meanwhile destroyed the number four bridge, the southernmost, in the past 48 hours. This effort impedes Daesh's freedom of movement in Mosul. It inhibits their ability to resupply or reinforce their fighters throughout the city," An official said using an Arabic acronym for the militant group.
- 23 November On 23 November, PMF reported cutting the road between Sinjar and Tal Afar, their Shia component groups advancing from the South linking up with the Sinjar Resistance Units and Êzîdxan Women's Units to the North, thus completing the encirclement of the Mosul pocket.
- A member of Islamic State killed a colonel.
- 24 November On 24 November, according to the Turkish military, the Syrian Arab Air Force conducted an airstrike against Turkish Special Forces and aligned Turkish-backed rebels north of al-Bab, killing three Turkish soldiers and injuring ten. Turkish officials initially stated the casualties were due to an IS attack, before blaming the Syrian Air Force. However, the pro-opposition activist group the SOHR disputed it was an air-strike and stated it was in fact an IS suicide attack. Additionally, IS confirmed it conducted a suicide attack in the area. Later, the Turkish Prime Minister's office issued a gag order on reporting about the airstrike, while the main opposition Republican People's Party (CHP) leader Kemal Kılıçdaroğlu called on the Turkish government to "act with common sense." In the evening, the Syrian Air Force officially denied it or the Russian Air Force had conducted an air-strike against Turkish forces. Concurrently during the day, the SDF, with support of government forces, captured three villages from IS west of al-Bab, coming within 10 kilometers of the city. The rebels also took two villages east of al-Bab, reaching the main road between al-Bab and Manbij for the first time.
- On 24 November, the Army pushed deep into the Hanano district, capturing more than half a dozen key buildings. The aim of the advance was to bisect the rebel-held part of Aleppo in two. Heavy and systematic government bombardment inflicted heavy rebel casualties. By the next day, government forces were in control of large parts of Hanano.
- The Iraqi Army also managed to liberate the villages of Tawajina, Qarat Tapa, Yarghinti and Hawsalat south of Mosul city.
- Insurgents killed 8 soldiers in Sinai Peninsula. 3 insurgents were also killed in the attack. 4 more soldiers bodies were found on Friday 25 November.
- November 2016 Hillah suicide truck bombing: A truck bomb killed at least 100 people in Hillah city.
- A car bomb blew up near the governor's office in the city of Adana. At least two people were killed and twenty others injured.
- A U.S. service member was killed by an improvised explosive device in northern Syria.
- 3 Turkish soldiers were killed and 7 others wounded in an attack by Islamic State militants near the northern Syrian city of al-Bab.
- Two young female suicide bombers attacked a town in Cameroon's far north region early on Thursday.One of the bombs exploded in Mora, killing the girl and wounding at least four people. Locals killed the second bomber before her device detonated.
- 2 special forces officers and 2 suspected militants were killed in a gunbattle in Nazran, Ingushetia.
- 25 November Multiple bombs killed at least 6 people and injured 27 others. The explosions occurred in Jalalabad city.
- Between 25 and 27 November, the SDF captured two villages from IS west of al-Bab, while the rebels took three to the east. Additionally, the rebels launched an attack on two SDF-held villages east of the city, with unclear results. At the same time, pro-government forces also advanced, taking control of four villages from IS west of al-Bab.
- At least five people, including a Turkish soldier were killed in an attack.
- Two soldiers were killed when several militants attempted to enter a mosque in Northern Pakistan. Two of the militants were killed by gunfire while the other two detonated their suicide vests.
- 26 November Islamic State mortars kill 16 Iraqi civilians in Mosul.
- On 26 November, GNA managed to take control of around 30 buildings, facing heavy resistance. During the clashes, two suicide bombers targeted them, while a woman, whom they were trying to provide a safe passage, started firing on them instead, before being killed. Between 26 and 27 November, 8–9 GNA fighters and 14 IS fighters were killed in the clashes.
- 27 November A blast ripped through a street in the northern Syrian town of al-Rai in what was believed to be an Islamic State suicide bombing, with several deaths reported and security and hospital sources saying 12 wounded, mostly children.
- Islamic State militants have fired a rocket in northern Syria that caused symptoms of "chemical gas" exposure in 22 Syrian rebels.
- IDF forces came under an ambush by Islamic State militants. Four terrorists were killed while there were no casualties among the IDF forces.
- Israeli aircraft raided IS positions killing 4 militants in response of an IS affiliate ("Yarmouk Martyrs Brigade") attack on an Israeli checkpoint in the Golan Heights.
- 28 November Soldiers killed at least 30 insurgents from terrorist group Boko Haram.
- Philippine police safely detonated an improvised explosive device (IED) found in a trash can meters away from the U.S. Embassy in Manila Monday. Abu Sayyaf (suspected)
- 29 November Ohio State University attack: A man named Abdul Razak Ali Artan rammed his car into a group of students at the Ohio State University. The perpetrator then proceeded to stab several others with a knife. Artan was killed on scene and was confirmed to be an OSU student and Somali refugee. The Islamic State claimed responsibility for the attack. Law enforcement officials stated that Artan was inspired by terrorist propaganda from the Islamic State and Muslim cleric Anwar al-Awlaki. Abdul Razak Ali Artan
- 30 November PMF said they captured 12 villages from IS in the Tal Afar area over the past five days.
- At the end of November, the Iraqi military assessed that it had taken control of 19 neighbourhoods in eastern Mosul during the month, constituting somewhat less than 30 percent of the area of Mosul east of the Tigris. While the "Golden Division" Special Operations Forces have persistently advanced into East Mosul, the 9th Division has taken one neighbourhood in the southeast, the 16th Division has not yet breached Mosul city limits from the north, and the 15th Division, advancing from the southwest, is still several kilometres away from the western Mosul.

=== December 2016 ===
- 1 December By 1 December, the territory under IS control was reduced to around 50 buildings in the area of two city blocks. By this point, the GNA also closed off all pathways for the militants to escape. Only families, women and children were allowed to exit the area. On 2 December, several women, who pretended to surrender, blew themselves up, killing 4 GNA fighters and wounding 38 others. IS had also recaptured a few buildings. The campaign was temporarily halted to preserve the lives of civilians, while a senior militant was arrested and 4 others surrendered. 42 women and children were rescued on the next day, while 6 militants, who tried to escape, were arrested. GNA captured 9 buildings on 4 December, with 10 women and children leaving IS-held area, while 2 militants, who tried to escape, were arrested.
- 3 December At least 24 people were killed in an attack by the Islamic State militant group in the Iraqi city of Mosul on Saturday.
- Several women committed suicide bombings that killed four Libyan soldiers. The victims had previously granted them safe passage to leave buildings under the control of Islamic State militants.
- 4 December At least 24 people were killed in an attack by the Islamic State in the Iraqi city of Mosul on Saturday.
- 5 December More than 20 militants and 3 GNA fighters were killed in the clashes. 34 militants, including 2 senior commanders, also surrendered, while 10 women and children left IS-held territory. GNA spokesman Ridda Issa claimed that the GNA was in control of Jizah neighbourhood, while another spokesman, Mohamed al-Gasri, stated that they were besieging the remaining militants. There were premature reports that Sirte had been fully captured by GNA. GNA fighters later confirmed that they still hadn't fully captured Jizah neighbourhood, with IS still controlling around 10 buildings. By the next day, IS was in control of less than 10 houses, with GNA trying to neutralize a small number of militants still present in the area and rescuing a group of women and children. Sirte was completely captured by pro-GNA militias later in the day. The last holdouts were defeated after heavy clashes earlier in the day and a combing operation on the last 3 IS-held buildings where they were barricaded. The last 9 militants surrendered to GNA during the night along with 10 women and children. By the end of the offensive, the United States had carried out 495 airstrikes against the group in Sirte. 21 women and 31 children were released from IS-held territory. 3 GNA fighters died in the final clashes. 6 militants were also killed or captured, while 3 blew themselves up, causing only material damage. Two attempted suicide bombings were also prevented while bodies of more than 30 militants were recovered. A total of 12 fighters were killed in the clashes on the last day.
- 6 December Twenty airstrikes by the US-Led coalition were heard on the morning of 6 December following an assault on the cities strategic main bridge that is currently held by IS. In the overnight hours, IS launched a counter-attack in the southeastern area of Mosul, near al-Salam; however, casualty figures from either side were not announced.
- 7 December Most of the city was destroyed in the battle, with unexploded explosives strewn across the streets and key services along with vital infrastructure also destroyed. The Red Crescent found 230 bodies confirmed to be of IS militants, as well as 36 other bodies in former positions of the group. Bunyan Marsous operations room on the other hand stated that 483 bodies were recovered. A wounded militant blew himself up on 7 December without causing any casualties. The Red Crescent found 230 bodies confirmed to be of IS militants, as well as 36 other bodies in former positions of the group. Bunyan Marsous operations room on the other hand stated that 483 bodies were recovered. A wounded militant blew himself up on 7 December without causing any casualties.
- Following the overnight IS attack, Iraqi forces continued to secure the al-Salam area, including the retaking of a hospital as well as the neighborhoods of Al-Barid, Masarif and Al-Alam.
- An Islamic State suicide bomber blew himself up near a hospital, killing 20 soldiers.
- 8 December IS launched the offensive in the northeastern countryside of Homs on 8 December 2016, targeting the SAA's defenses near the village of Huwaysis and the Jazal Mountains located north of Palmyra. The group began the attack by sending two waves of fighters to storm its defenses near Huwaysis, resulting in heavy clashes. It was however unable to penetrate the first line of defense and was forced to withdraw. Local media reported that 60 militants were killed, while eight of their armored vehicles were destroyed. The group launched another assault later in the day, with simultaneous attacks near the Jazal, Mahr and Shaer oil and gas fields as well as the areas of Huwaysis, Arak, Palmyra Silos, al-Hayyal Mount, al-Sekkary, the ancient al-Hallabat Palace and the abandoned battalion near the T4 airbase. It was able to capture 7 checkpoints from the Army which withdrew after heavy clashes. In addition, it also captured the al-Hallabat Palace, al-Hayyal Mount, South Sawamea and Huwaysis. At least 34 pro-government fighters were killed and four, including an officer, were captured. With these advances, the group came within 4 kilometres (2.5 mi) of Palmyra. The group also captured grain silos northeast of Palmyra as well as the Jazal village and its oil fields.
- 9 December The SAA counter-attacked on 9 December, to recapture the positions it lost the previous day, in addition to bringing in reinforcements and launching airstrikes. 15 soldiers were killed in an IS ambush near the Mahr oil field. The group captured the al-Berej hills, Jihar oil fields, Mahr oil fields as well as a checkpoint near it during the clashes.
- Six police officers were killed in a bombing near a checkpoint in the Egyptian capital. Three additional officers and four civilians were wounded by the blast. Islamic State (suspected)
- Terrorists launched a "double-tap" car bombing outside the Benghazi headquarters of Saiqa Special Force. The two blasts appear to have killed nobody outright but left 22 people injured.
- Madagali suicide bombings: Officials say 2 explosions in Madagali a town Nigeria have killed 57 and injured 177.
- 10 December SDF launched the second phase on 10 December, with aim of capturing the western countryside of al-Raqqa, ultimately to reach the Tabqa Dam. It was also announced that SDF Arab groups, the Elite Forces, Jabhat Thuwar al-Raqqa and the newly formed Deir Ezzor Military Council would be taking part. During the first day, the SDF began to advance south of Tishrin Dam and captured al-Kiradi village. The United States meanwhile announced that it would send 200 more troops to assist the SDF. On the next day, the SDF reportedly captured seven more villages from IS.
- On 10 December, Army reinforcements arrived in Palmyra. At least 45 militants were killed by the Army, with 3 tanks of the group destroyed near Palmyra Silos. An earlier assault by the group on the silos failed, however it was able to capture them later on, thus reaching the entrance of Palmyra. The Russian Air Force along with Syrian Air Force targeted IS positions in oil fields around Palmyra, destroying several armoured vehicles and a number of technical vehicles. A Syrian Air Force MiG-23 crashed in the Jazal area. IS claimed to have shot it down, while the SOHR reported it was not known whether it crashed due to technical fault or was shot down. Clashes also started taking place around Wadi al-Ahmar where the Army brought reinforcements. The group later captured the Tar Mountain to the west of the city, in addition to the northern suburb of Amiriyeh and entered Palmyra. By the end of the day, they had captured most of the city, including Palmyra Castle, and were on the verge of taking full control of Palmyra.
- A civilian died and another 3 were injured in bombing attack.
- Three members of Abu Sayyaf, including a leader, were killed in a shooting between the police and the militant. The shooting occurred in Malaysia.
- December 2016 Aden suicide bombing: 50 Yemeni soldiers were killed and another 70 were injured in a suicide bombing attack.
- 11 December Early on 11 December, after the arrival of reinforcements, the Syrian Army, backed by Syrian and Russian air units, launched a successful counterattack to drive out IS forces from the city. The militants withdrew to the orchards on the fringes of Palmyra. According to the Russian Defense of Ministry, IS suffered over 300 dead. However, later in the day, IS launched a new assault on Palmyra after regrouping, entering the city once again and capturing Amiriyeh, its hilltop and the Officers Housing complex. Eventually, IS took full control of the city as the Army withdrew south of Palmyra.
- IS started advancing westwards from Palmyra to the Tiyas airbase after the city's capture on 11 December. The group captured two villages to the west of city during the day. It also captured the Abandoned (al-Majora) battalion to the west of the airbase.
- December 2016 Istanbul bombings: Two bomb killed 44 and injured at least 155 people in Istanbul.
- Saint Mark's Coptic Orthodox Cathedral bombing: At least 25 people were killed and 49 injured after an explosion in a Coptic cathedral in Cairo.
- 3 people were killed in two suicide bombing attack in Maiduguri.
- Two car bombing kills at least 8 people in Fallujah.
- The CTS forces mentioned that they had captured another district of east Mosul, al-Nour neighborhood.
- 12 December On early 12 December, IS launched an attack against the strategically important Jihar Crossroad near the airbase, and captured it after heavy clashes. It also captured al-Mahjora battalion to the west of the base. It later captured security checkpoints in the nearby districts of Mashtal and Qasr al-Hir, allowing it to launch an attack against the airbase, spearheaded by two VBIEDs, resulting in an hours-long battle with the entrenched SAA defenders. Aided by numerous Russian airstrikes, the government forces eventually repelled the assault, as IS forces regrouped for another attempt at breaching the airbase's defenses. Meanwhile, hundreds of pro-government reinforcements arrived at the frontline, which belonged to the NDF-affiliated Qalamoun Shield and Golan Regiment. Russia meanwhile carried out airstrikes against IS in Palmyra, killing 5 people.
- On 12 December, the SDF captured 4 villages as well as many hamlets south of Tishrin Dam. SDF captured 5 villages during the next two days.
- 5 people were executed by Islamic State militants.
- A military vehicle struck a roadside bomb during a security swoop in North Sinai's city of Sheikh Zuweid, killing four soldiers.
- 13 December The group attacked the airbase again on 13 December after advancing around it and applied a siege to it. Reinforcements including from the Syrian Army and Russian special forces arrived to the base later in the day. During the day, the group advanced on a checkpoint on a road to Al-Qaryatayn. An assault by the group on Tiyas pumping station during the night was repelled.
- 16 civilians were executed by Islamic State militants.
- A senior commander of the Afghan Border Police forces was killed in an explosion in eastern Kunar province. Islamic State (suspected)
- A military vehicle struck a roadside bomb during a security swoop in North Sinai's city of Sheikh Zuweid, killing four soldiers.
- While the PMF to the West continued clearing villages in the desert region of the IS heartland, on 13 December it was reported that the Badr militia was targeting villages around Tal Afar to "surround Daesh and tighten the noose around them", and Kata'ib Hezbollah advanced further west towards the Syrian border.
- 14 December The clashes renewed on 14 December, with the Army trying to regain areas it previously lost around the airbase. The Army recaptured the Tiyas Mountain as well as the Abandoned Battalion located in the north of the airbase after launching a counteroffensive during early morning. It also regained checkpoints on roads to al-Qaryatayn it had lost a day earlier. IS meanwhile captured al-Sharifah village to the west of the airbase. Later that day, IS launched another attack on the airbase, but thanks to newly arrived government reinforcements, belonging to the paratrooper forces of Republican Guard's 800th Regiment, the assault was repelled. In the following night, a SAA counter-attack drove IS from the airbase's outskirts.
- Two police officers, and a 12-year-old boy were stabbed in the head with a screwdriver.
- 16 December The US-led coalition stated on 16 December that it carried out airstrikes near the airbase against IS on 15 December, destroying the heavy weaponry it seized after recapturing Palmyra. An air defense artillery system, 14 tanks, 3 artillery systems, 2 ISIä-held buildings and 2 tactical vehicles were destroyed in total. Syrian Army launched another counterattack on 16 December, recapturing the Qaryatayn – T4 crossroads area. They later also recaptured al-Sharifah villages and reopened the direct route between al-Qaryatayn and the airbase. Omar Assad, a leader of IS, was also killed in the clashes.
- 17 December A car bomb killed 13 soldiers and wounded 56 in Kayseri. A PKK offshoot claimed responsibility.
- A member of the civilian Joint Task Force (JTF) was injured during operations against Boko Haram.
- 8 African Coalition Forces were killed by Boko Haram militants.
- The Army recaptured a checkpoint near al-Qaryatayn on 17 December. Another attack by IS later in the day was repelled, while the Army captured Al-Sha'arah Hills to the north of the Abandoned Battalion.
- 18 December The Turkish military stated on 18 December that 57 IS targets, including a number of weapons depots, were destroyed in airstrikes in the al-Bab, Bzagah, Zammar, Suflaniyyah and Kabr al-Mukri regions. It later also stated that a Turkish soldier was killed by a car bomb in al-Bab while 11 IS fighters were killed in clashes.
- December 2016 Aden suicide bombings: At least 49 Yemeni soldiers collecting their salaries at a base in northeast Aden were killed when a suicide bomber detonated.
- 2016 Karak Shooting: Insurgents attacked police and civilians in several locations in Kerak, Jordan, including Kerak Castle. 5 people, 4 Jordanian policemen and a Canadian tourist, were killed. The assailants also taken hostages, many of them Malaysian tourists. At least ten Jordanian civilians were injured during the fire exchange, of which 2 are in a critical situation. Al-Qaeda (suspected)
- A car bombing attack kills one soldier from Turkey in al-Bab city.
- At least seven people were killed and eight wounded when a suicide bomber targeted forces loyal to Libya's eastern government in Benghazi.
- 19 December IS launched another attack on the airbase on 19 December and claimed to have shot down a Russian helicopter. The attack failed with 36 IS fighters being killed in the attack. At least 20 pro-government fighters were killed in it while a helicopter was shot down, leaving its two pilots dead. Clashes took place between the two sides on outskirts of Abu Kala Dam as well as other areas near the airbase on 20 December. IS was also repeatedly attacking the Abandoned Battalion in order to retake it. On 22 December, IS launched another attack in the morning, however failed. They launched another assault later on which failed as well. The group was then driven back to Palmyra.
- Assassination of Andrei Karlov: A gunman killed Russian ambassador in Turkey. He was transported to hospital in critical condition. Three bystanders were also injured. Islamic State are suspected to be behind the attack. The gunman was shot and killed on the scene. Jaish al-Fatah
- An Islamic State militant beheads an Afghan militiaman working with the SAA at the T4 Military Airport near Homs, Syria.
- 20 December 2016 Berlin truck attack: 13 people have died after a truck ploughed into a Christmas market in Berlin, German police have said. The Islamic State claimed responsibility for the attack. On 21 December, police announced a nationwide search for a specific suspect, after personal documents of a Tunisian man, apparently a notice for temporary stay in Germany, were found in the lorry's cab. Later that day the police announced that it had been stepped up to a Europe-wide search. According to investigators, the suspect entered Germany from Italy in 2015 and belonged to a Salafist network with the name True Religion, around recently interred Abu Walaa, who was known as a recruiter for the Islamic State in Germany.
- Clashes took place between the two sides on outskirts of Abu Kala Dam as well as other areas near the airbase on 20 December. IS was also repeatedly attacking the Abandoned Battalion in order to retake it.
- 21 December A twin bomb attack on the headquarters of an Iranian Kurdish party based in northern Iraq has killed seven people. A twin bomb attack on the headquarters of an Iranian Kurdish party based in northern Iraq has killed seven people.
- Turkish military stated on 21 December 15 IS fighters were killed in Turkish airstrikes on the previous day. It later stated that the rebels had gained complete control of the highway between Al-Bab and Aleppo. It also stated that 14 Turkish soldiers were killed in clashes and by IS suicide attacks, while 33 were wounded. 138 IS fighters were also killed in Turkish airstrikes on 67 IS targets according to it. Rebels advanced in the hospital area of the town after an IS counterattack on them in Aqil Mount as well as the hospital itself.
- Qal'at Ja'bar was captured on 21 December, along with four nearby villages including Jabar. The coalition then began to move toward Suwaydiya Saghirah and Suwaydiya Kabir, the last villages before Tabqa Dam. Even though an IS counter-attack managed to retake Jabar village soon after, the SDF attacked again on 23 December, and once again took control of Jabar, while also capturing Suwaydiya Saghirah and another village. Later that day, however, IS launched yet another counter-attack accompanied by several suicide car bombs, resulting in heavy clashes with the SDF in the East and West Jabar villages.
- Turkish military stated on 21 December that 15 IS fighters were killed in Turkish airstrikes on the previous day. It later stated that the rebels had gained complete control of the highway between Al-Bab and Aleppo. It also stated that 16 Turkish soldiers were killed in suicide bomb attacks and clashes, while 33 were wounded. 138 IS fighters were also killed in Turkish airstrikes on 67 IS targets according to it. IS meanwhile claimed to have killed more than 70 Turkish soldiers, while capturing two Leopard 2 tanks. Rebels advanced in the hospital area of the town after an IS counterattack on them in Aqil Mount as well as the hospital itself. The rebel attack was however later repelled.
- 22 December Another attack was launched by rebels on 22 December. SOHR reported that 72 civilians were killed in Turkish airstrikes during the day, with another 16 killed on the next day.
- Three suicide car bombings kills at least 23 people in Mosul.
- The U.N. mission said that two mortar attacks in eastern Mosul killed four aid workers and seven other civilians in the past two days. Another 40 people were also wounded in the attacks. The U.N. did not identify the aid workers or provide their nationalities.
- IS launched a counter-attack against the Jabar area in the following night and recaptured it, while the SDF continued to advance against IS-held villages further north.
- U.S. Air Force Brigadier General Matthew Isler announced on 21 December that pro-government forces had entered a planned operational refit which included repairing vehicles, re-supplying ammunition and preparing for the next stage of the battle. He also stated that they had captured more than a quarter of the city.
- UN stated on 22 December that 4 Iraqi aid workers and 7 civilians were killed because of mortar fire. Later, IS launched a triple suicide bomb attack at a market in Gogjali. 23 people including 15 civilians were killed in the attacks according to Iraqi military.
- The group launched another offensive on 22 December, this time around Jubb al-Jarrah and captured the village of Khattab. They also captured the village of Al-Mazar as well as several military checkpoints near Jubb al-Jarrah during early morning on 23 December. An IS assault at Jubb Al-Jarrah, Maksar Al-Hissan, and Al-Masoudiyah, which was launched in order to besiege the airbase from several areas, was later repelled. At least 27 pro-government fighters and 25 IS fighters were killed in the clashes. Syrian Army later launched a counterattack, capturing Qubbah Hill and its checkpoints.
- 23 December Two Turkish soldiers were burned to death in the Aleppo countryside.
- Iraqi Army captured the Mosul Police Academy headquarters in Al-Qahira district on 23 December. This was their first major advancement since suspension of military operations a week earlier.
- President of Turkey Recep Tayyip Erdoğan stated on 23 December that the operation to capture al-Bab was almost complete and FSA will capture the city soon. The Turkish military meanwhile stated that they killed 40 IS fighters and also destroyed the group's headquarters in the city. Turkish Defence Minister Fikri Işık meanwhile stated that the Aqil Mount had been cleared of IS presence.
- 24 December 10 people were killed in a series of attacks in Mosul.
- At least 16 people, including a police officer, were injured in a blast outside a Catholic church in the southern Philippines. Islamist militants (suspected)
- As of 24 December, clashes continued around the airbase, with 13 soldiers killed in an IS attack on al-Sharifa.
- On 26 December 2016, the Caucasus 'province' of the Islamic State, Wilayat al-Qawqaz, claimed responsibility for the 24 December attacks on police officers in Kizilyurt.
- U.S. Army Colonel Brett G. Sylvia stated on 24 December that American soldiers assisting Iraqi forces will be embedded more extensively and will partner with additional formations.
- 25 December Separate bombings in and around Baghdad have killed at least 11 civilians and wounded 34 others.
- A suicide bombing attack left at least 2 people dead and injured 5 others in Mora.
- At least 97 IS soldiers were killed in Mosul during the day according to Operations Commander Lieutenant-General Abdulamir Rashid Yarallah. He stated that an attack by IS on police stations south of Abuyosif area resulted in the death of 21 soldiers. He also added that another attack at Al-Intisar, Salam and Al-Shaima'a neighborhoods had killed 51 IS soldiers, while the anti-IS coalition killed 25 militants in airstrikes on their hideout.
- 26 December Islamic State kills at least 30 people in al-Bab.
- IS launched another assault on 26 December, storming the Army's position west of Badiyah area of Palmyra and then on its positions north of the Sha'rah Hills. It was however repelled later. Clashes broke out again near the airbase as well as al-Sharifa during the day, with the Army advancing in the area.
- On 26 December, The Turkish military stated that it destroyed 113 IS targets during the day. Pro-Syrian government sources meanwhile reported the Russian airforce directly backed the Turkish army for the first time since start of Russian intervention in Syria. However, despite Su-24 and Su-34 bombers carrying out airstrikes against IS fighters, Turkish backed rebel forces were unable to maintain control over recently captured areas.
- 27 December On 27 December, IS launched an attack on the village of Secol in the northern countryside, reportedly breaching the local YPG defences. On the next day, the SDF reportedly captured Hadaj village after two days of heavy fighting, while another IS counter-attack against Jabar was repelled.
- An additional 1,000 Turkish commandos and 2,000 rebel reinforcements arrived on 27 December. Meanwhile, the Turkish military stated that during the day a Turkish soldier succumbed to his wounds received in clashes 6 days ago, while 13 IS fighters and 2 rebels were killed in clashes on the previous day. Turkish Deputy Prime Minister Kurtmuluş on the same day denied the reports that Russian Air Force was assisting it in the battle.
- Amaq News Agency stated the anti-IS coalition had destroyed the Old Bridge, the last functioning bridge in Mosul. The coalition meanwhile stated that it had disabled a Mosul bridge in airstrikes without providing the details.
- 28 December An explosion in Kabul reportedly leads to casualties. Afghan police state that the attack was aimed at a member of the National Assembly.
- The military stated on 28 December that 44 IS fighters were killed and 154 IS targets were destroyed.
- 29 December A Turkish official stated on 29 December that Russian Air Force had hit IS in al-Bab for the first time, carrying out airstrikes against it in southern part of the city. He also added that Turkish forces were assaulting northern and western part of the city. Turkish Foreign Minister Mevlüt Çavuşoğlu confirmed the airstrikes but stated that there was no joint operation between Russia and Turkey.
- 2016 Hilongos bombings: Two bombs injured 33 people who were attending an amateur boxing match in the town of Hilongos. Maute Group (suspected)
- A bomb exploded on a highway on the island of Mindanao, in Aleosan, wounding six people.
- Iraqi forces launched the second phase of the battle on 29 December, pushing from three directions into eastern Mosul districts. Iraqi soldiers and Federal Police entered about half a dozen southeastern districts. CTS meanwhile advanced in al-Quds and Karama districts. In the third front, Iraqi soldiers also pushed toward the northern limits. Jabouri stated that they were ordered by the Prime Minister to reach the Tigris River.
- Iraqi security forces advanced in several areas on 30 December. In the northern front, the 16th Division stormed the Habdaa district while also trying to cut off the supply lines to Tel Kayf. Clashes broke out again in one of the villages reported to be captured a day earlier.
- 31 December December 2016 Baghdad bombings: Bombings left at least 25 people dead and 50 others were injured in Baghdad.
- 31 December Heavy clashes occurred on the southeastern and northern fronts of Mosul. An army officer deployed in the southeastern front reported that their advances were slowed down due to heavy clashes and difficulty in differentiating between civilians and militants. Iraqi forces on the northern front advances towards the periphery of Mosul, with an officer stating that heavy clashes were ongoing in the Argoob area. The U.S. military meanwhile stated that its airstrikes on a van carrying IS fighters at a hospital compound parking lot might have killed civilians.
- 31 December The Islamic State claims responsibility for a New Year's Day mass shooting at an Istanbul nightclub, killing 39.
