= March 2016 Hillah suicide truck bombing =

Suicide terrorist attack in Iraq

- Part of Iraqi Civil War
- Location of Babil Governorate in Iraq
- Location: 33°23′20″N 44°27′30″E; Hillah, Babil Governorate, Iraq
- Date: 6 March 2016
- Attack type: Mass murder Suicide attack Car bombing
- Weapon: Truck bombs
- Deaths: 60
- Injuries: 70
- Perpetrator: Islamic State

The 2016 Hillah suicide truck bombing was a suicide bombing on 6 March 2016, that killed at least 60 people and another 70 were injured after ramming his explosives-laden truck into a security checkpoint at one of entrances to the Iraqi city of Hillah, south of Baghdad. The Islamic State (IS) claims responsibility for the attack.

== See also ==
- 2005 Al Hillah bombing
- 2007 Al Hillah bombings
- 2014 Hillah bombing
- November 2016 Hillah suicide truck bombing
- List of terrorist incidents, January–June 2016
