= May 2015 U.S. special forces raid in Syria =

Part of the Syrian Civil War

2015 U.S. special forces raid in Syria
- Part of the American-led intervention against ISIL in the Syrian Civil War
Date	15 May 2015
Location	al-Amr, Deir ez-Zor Governorate, Syria
Result	CJTF-OIR victory

Belligerents
United States; Supported by: United Kingdom (surveillance)	Islamic State of Iraq and the Levant

Commanders and leaders
(United States) Barack Obama	Abu Sayyaf †; Umm Sayyaf (POW)

Strength
1st SFOD-D; Special Air Service; UH-60 Black Hawk and V-22 Osprey aircraft	Military of ISIL

Casualties and losses
None	31+ fighters killed: 12 killed during raid; 19 killed by airstrikes (per SOHR); 1 Yazidi slave freed

On 15 May 2015, 1st SFOD-D operators from the Joint Special Operations Command based in Iraq conducted an operation in Al-Amr, Syria to capture a senior Islamic State of Iraq and the Levant (ISIL) leader named Abu Sayyaf, resulting in his death when he engaged United States forces in combat, after his location was confirmed by surveillance from British SAS operators. Abu Sayyaf's role in ISIL was managing its gas and oil operations; he had built up a network of traders and wholesalers of ISIL-controlled oil that he helped triple energy revenues for the terror group. His other duties for the group included approving expenses to cover the upkeep of slaves, rebuilding oil facilities damaged by airstrikes and counting of revenue. The wife of Abu Sayyaf, Umm Sayyaf was captured and is currently held by U.S. Forces in Iraq. The operation also led to the freeing of a Yazidi woman who was held as a slave. About a dozen ISIL fighters were also killed in the raid, two US officials said. The Syrian Observatory for Human Rights reported that an additional 19 ISIL fighters were killed in the US airstrikes that accompanied the raid. One official said that ISIL Forces fired at the U.S. aircraft, and there was reportedly hand-to-hand combat during the raid. Sikorsky UH-60 Black Hawk helicopters and Bell Boeing V-22 Osprey tilt-rotor aircraft were used to conduct the raid.

Intelligence discovered in the raid revealed how ISIL was funding itself through the group's construction of a multinational oil operation with help from terrorist-group executives determined to maximize profits. The intelligence also showed how the organization deals with the Syrian government, handles corruption allegations among top officials and most critically, how international coalition strikes have dented but not destroyed ISIS income. Defense Secretary Ash Carter called the raid a "significant blow" against Islamic State and heralded the death of the terror group's No. 2 oil executive. CNN reported that the US got valuable information on the leader of ISIS, Abu Bakr al-Baghdadi, from the wife after two days of interrogation.

The raid was also a test for a new strategy of "targeted killing" for the Expeditionary Targeting Force.

== See also ==
- Foreign involvement in the Syrian Civil War
