= 2014 American rescue mission in Syria =

2014 military operation

- Part of the Syrian Civil War and the Military intervention against the Islamic State
Date	4 July 2014
Location	Uqayrishah, near Raqqa, Syria
Result	Operation failed

Belligerents
United States; Jordan (unconfirmed)	Islamic State: Military of the Islamic State

Commanders and leaders
(United States) Barack Obama	(Islamic State) Abu Bakr al-Baghdadi (Caliph); Abu Ali al-Anbari (Deputy, Syria) Abu Omar al-Shishani (Field commander in Syria)

Units involved
1st SFOD-D; 75th Ranger Regiment, Regimental Reconnaissance Company; 160th Special Operations Aviation Regiment	Unknown

Strength
Ground force: Around 24 Delta Force operators Unknown number of Army Rangers; 1 Jordanian special forces operator Aircraft: 4 MH-60 Black Hawk helicopters including 2 MH-60L; 1 AC-130 Gunship; 2 MQ-1 Predator drones Fighter jets	Unknown

Casualties and losses
1 U.S. soldier wounded 1 Jordanian soldier wounded (unconfirmed)	5–8 militants killed

The 2014 rescue mission in Syria was an American led effort to locate and rescue hostages being held by Islamic State (IS) forces. Plans to rescue the hostages were accelerated after the killings of James Foley, Steven Sotloff, and Kayla Mueller by IS militants. A total of 14 hostages were held hostage by the IS at an undisclosed location. Though no soldiers were killed, the mission failed to locate and rescue the hostages.

== History ==
Foley, Sotloff and Mueller were all American citizens. Foley was working as a freelancer for GlobalPost and other media outlets like Agence France-Presse during the Syrian Civil War when he was captured by IS militants in 2012. Sotloff was an American-Israeli journalist who was working as a reporter in Syria before his capture. Mueller was captured by IS after leaving a hospital in the region. IS is a militant group, established in 2006, that primarily operates in Iraq and Syria. The organization receives funding from oil production and smuggling, taxes, ransoms from kidnappings, selling stolen artifacts, extortion and controlling crops.

Foley, Sotloff, and Mueller were kidnapped at varying times and held hostage by IS until their deaths. Hostages from other countries were also captured and held for ransom. The United States government does not negotiate with terrorists and refuses to pay ransom to these organizations. However, there are other countries that do not abide by the same policy and paid the ransom for their citizens held captive by IS forces. The surviving hostages were instrumental in assisting the United States with locating and targeting the potential hostage house. The US sent the FBI to make contact with former European hostages who were released when their home country paid the ransom. During the FBI's interview with the released hostages (whose names have not been disclosed for security reasons), they were able to compile information about the hostage house and where to locate the hostages within the home.

== Mission planning ==
One of the original hostages' ransom was paid by the British government and this individual was released from IS. The Federal Bureau of Investigation (FBI) was able to locate and contact this individual for questioning in regards to where the remaining hostages were located – geographical location and who could be located inside the hostage house – and other information that would assist officials in conducting the mission. Statements from the unidentified source along with other intelligence gatherings were then taken to the Pentagon to discuss the specific details of the rescue mission. Officials were aware that the possibility of successfully rescuing all of the hostages without a single American fatality would be slim but the risk was too big not to act. The covert mission was approved and operation planning soon ensued.

== Operation ==
Once the FBI finished their initial data collection abroad, it was submitted to the Department of Defense for analysis. More information was further compiled as the investigative team raced to assess the location of the home, any persons who may be guarding the home, and any other factors that needed to be assessed. Although there was a fear that the remaining hostages had been moved, ultimately the planning for the covert mission began as the risk of not attempting the rescue mission was too great. In early July, U.S. air strikes were conducted against an IS military base camp known as the "Osama bin Laden Camp" while modified Black Hawk helicopters left from an FOB in Jordan and traveled towards the suspected hostage house. As the special operations team landed near the home they instantly encountered and killed multiple IS members. After landing on the ground, the soldiers blocked the main road towards Raqqa and ambushed the suspected hostage-house in a prison. The special operations team searched the home under the protection of drones circling above, and with ‘warplanes’ on standby. The raid is said to have involved dozens of special operations forces from all US military services, including the 160th Special Operations Aviation Regiment.

The special operations team was unable to locate and rescue any hostages. The special operations team conducted house-to-house searches in Uqayrishah. At this time, IS forces from Raqqa began to arrive and a three-hour firefight ensued. During the fighting, militants also directed RPG fire at a U.S. aircraft; a bullet grazed the leg of the pilot.

Later, it was reported the hostages had been relocated 24 hours before the attempted rescue. It remained unclear whether the operation failed due to incorrect intelligence or if IS forces had been alerted in advance of the mission.

During the home search, the special forces were able to acquire cellphones, hair, half-eaten meals and, blankets for forensic evidence. After searching the home and gathering forensic evidence the operations team returned to the undisclosed base.

== Aftermath ==
John Kirby, Pentagon Press Secretary during the Syrian Rescue Mission, issued this statement in regard to the failed mission, "the operation involved air and ground components and was focused on a particular captor network within ISIS." However, the mission was unsuccessful because the targets were not at the target location. No American forces were killed during the operation, however during the immediate storming of the suspected location, one IS fighter fired at a Black Hawk helicopter, striking the pilot in the leg.

A Department of Defense (DOD) official commented on the failure of this mission that, "we're not sure why they were moved... By the time we got there, it was too late... a matter of hours, perhaps a day or two" since the American hostages had been moved from their initial location. Defense officials were openly frustrated with the transparency of the administration regarding information of this mission. The National Security Council spokeswoman expressed that they had, "never intended to disclose this operation." This issue is extremely concerning and was taken into consideration when President Obama reiterated to the Member States at the Security Council that, "foreign fighters were likely to return to their home countries to carry out attacks."

== Political aftermath ==
The failure of the operation resulted in backlash from both sides of the political aisle. During an interview, President Obama commented, "We will do everything we can, short of providing an incentive for future Americans to be caught." Although the policy remains to not negotiate with terrorist organizations, the administration admitted that communication with families could have been improved. In response to this, the administration requested a review of the operation by the National Counterterrorism Center. Nonetheless, families of the victims still criticized the non-negotiating and raised the concern of the timeline for the rescue operation. Despite the concerns, senior officials remarked on the complexity of the operation and deemed the logistical planning of the operation one of the fastest moving approval processes.
