= Tri-City College Prep High School =

Coordinates: 34°38′09″N 112°24′20″W

Location
- 5522 Side Road; Prescott, Arizona 86301; United States

Information
- School type: Public Charter High School
- Established: 1999 (27 years ago)
- Superintendent: Mary Ellen Halvorson
- CEEB code: 030371
- Principal: Keri Milliken
- Grades: 7-12
- Enrollment: 280 (2023–2024)
- Colors: Maroon and Silver
- Athletics conference: CAA
- Mascot: Panther
- Website: tricityprep.org

Tri-City College Prep High School (TCP) is a grade 7-12 High School in Prescott, Arizona. The school focuses on academics to prepare their students for college life.

== History ==
Tri-City College Prep High School was founded on $2000 and a promise to a man shortly after he died. While Paul W. Bear was on his deathbed, he gave his granddaughter, Mary Ellen Halvorson, $2000 and told her to make that money grow into something he'd be proud of. His granddaughter spent years of hard work researching what investment would make her grandfather proud. After receiving her doctorate in education, Mary Ellen Halvorson decided that the best investment for that $2000 was to invest in the education and future of younger generations.

In 1998, Dr. Mary Ellen Halvorson designed a high school to prepare young adults for college. She developed a school that allowed students still in high school to take college-level courses. The school opened its doors in 1999 on the Embry-Riddle Aeronautical University.

Just as Halvorson planned, her idea grew into a career. In 2005, the school made enough money to move into its own campus only three miles from its original. In 2008 Keri Milliken, the Principal, moved to build a gym to accommodate the want for athletic teams, such as Basketball, Volleyball, and Crew Rowing.

Today, TCP has become known for its quality education focusing on college preparation and offering college credits from both Graceland University and Yavapai College. Within the state, It was one of five high schools in 2011 to make Arizona Business & Education Coalition's list of "All Subject Higher Performing Schools." It was also ranked 68th best by U.S. News & World Report in 2015. TCP is proud to say that 98% of every graduating class continues to higher education after high school graduation. As per the promise made to Paul W. Bear, the school is continuing to grow to make his original $2000 everlasting.

== Academics ==
TCP offers an intense high school academic program including Advanced Placement and Honors courses. Some courses offered include Chemistry, Geometry, Civics, etc. In addition to high school courses, TCP offers classes available for college credit by Yavapai College. Some of these classes include Calculus, Biology, College Communications, etc.. TCP has recently added a Biology 156 program which students will find helpful when going into the medical field at Yavapai College.

== Athletics ==
TCP currently hosts seven sports teams through the AIA.

=== Fall Sports ===
- Women's Volleyball
- Men's Soccer
- Mountain Biking (Arizona Cycling Association)

=== Winter Sports ===
- Men's Basketball
- Women's Basketball

=== Spring Sports ===
- Golf
- Women's Soccer
- Men's Volleyball

=== Year Round Sports ===
- Archery

== Fine Arts ==
TCP requires each student to participate in 2 years worth of a fine arts program. This encourages students to become well-rounded and talented individuals. TCP's Fine Arts programs include:

- Theatre
- Choir
- Art
- Drama
- Film Studies

== Foreign Languages ==
Each foreign language instructor comes from an international background corresponding to their language of study. Each foreign language course is offered in beginner level and intermediate level. The languages offered are as follows:

- Spanish
- French
- Russian

== Notable alumni ==
- Kayla Mueller - human rights activist and aid worker killed in Syria
