= Madagali suicide bombings =

2016 terror attack in Madagali, Nigeria

- Part of the Boko Haram insurgency
- Madagali (Nigeria)
- Location: Madagali, Adamawa State, Nigeria
- Date: 9 December 2016
- Attack type: Suicide bombing
- Deaths: 57
- Injuries: 177
- Perpetrator: Islamic State of Iraq and the Levant: Boko Haram

The Madagali suicide bombings occurred on 9 December 2016 when 10 women suicide bombers attacked Madagali, a town in Nigeria. The attack killed at least 57 people and injured 177. Among those individuals injured 120 were reported to be children. "Officials have blamed the Boko Haram Islamic extremists."

== See also ==
- List of Islamist terrorist attacks
- List of terrorist incidents in December 2016
- List of terrorist incidents linked to ISIL
- Number of terrorist incidents by country
- Timeline of ISIL-related events (2016)
