= November 2016 Hillah suicide truck bombing =

Terrorist attack in Hillah, Iraq

- Part of the War in Iraq (2013–2017) and the Persecution of Shias by the Islamic State
- Location of Babil Governorate in Iraq
- Location: Hillah, Babil Governorate, Iraq
- Date: 24 November 2016
- Target: Petrol station
- Attack type: Suicide truck bombing
- Weapon: Truck bombs
- Deaths: 125 (+1)
- Injuries: 95+
- Perpetrator: Islamic State

A suicide bombing occurred in Iraq on 24 November 2016 when a truck bomb exploded at a petrol station in Hillah, some 100 kilometers (62 miles) from southern Baghdad, killing at least 125 people and injuring many others.

Shia pilgrims were en route back to Iran after the 2016 Arba'een Pilgrimage. Besides Iranians, people from Basra and Nasiriyah were also killed in the attack.

The Islamic State claimed responsibility for it.

== Bombing ==
The pilgrims were on their way back to Iran from the holy city of Karbala after participating in the annual Arba'een Pilgrimage. According to a police official, five buses filled with pilgrims stopped by a famous restaurant, next to a petrol station, burst into flames after the detonation of an "explosives-laden truck". According to a report, the bomb had been packed with 500 liters of ammonium nitrate.

Reportedly, the Hillah suicide truck bombing happened a day after dozens of bombings in and around Baghdad by the Islamic State in which 31 people were killed and over 100 injured. There were some attacks during Arba'een this year, but these were insignificant compared to incidents in previous years. Despite ongoing dangers, people from around the world continued their journey to Karbala. According to Iraqi officials, approximately three million Iranians visited Iraq, making them the largest contingent of foreigners at the Arba'een Pilgrimage in 2016.

== Perpetrator ==
The Islamic State claimed responsibility for the attack.

== Motivation ==
After the offensive launched on 17 October to liberate the last remaining city in Iraq under IS control, Mosul, IS intensified their attacks aiming to weaken the Mosul offensive.

== Reactions ==
- Iran – Foreign Ministry spokesman Bahram Qasemi condemned the attack and said that Iran would continue to support Iraq's "relentless fight against terrorism." Furthermore, in a message, Iranian President Hassan Rouhani criticized the attack stating that it is a sign of frustration among the terrorists who could not bear the peaceful rituals managed and observed in the city of Karbala during the current Arbaeen pilgrimage.
- United States – The White House issued a statement that read it condemns the attack saying the bombing "was clearly intended to stoke sectarian tensions."
- Grand Ayatollah Ali Sistani condemned the Hilla attack and warned that the perpetrators would receive a response to their crimes on the battleground at Mosul.

== See also ==
- List of Islamist terrorist attacks
- List of mass car bombings
- List of terrorist incidents in November 2016
- List of terrorist incidents linked to the Islamic State
- March 2016 Hillah suicide truck bombing
- 2005 Al Hillah bombing
- Number of terrorist incidents by country
- Terrorist incidents in Iraq in 2016
- Timeline of ISIL-related events (2016)
- Timeline of the Iraq War (2016)
