= 2016 Khuzdar bombing =

ISIL terrorist incident in Pakistan

Coordinates: 27°47′42″N 66°37′7″E

- Location of Balochistan in Pakistan
- Location: Khuzdar, Balochistan, Pakistan
- Date: 12 November 2016
- Attack type: Bombing
- Weapon: Bomb
- Deaths: 55+ (+1)
- Injuries: 102
- Perpetrator: ISIS
- Motive: Anti-Sufism

The Shah Noorani shrine in Balochistan was attacked on November 12, 2016. More than 55 people were killed in the attack and another 100 were injured. Several people were killed and injured due to a stampede caused by the blast and scores of injured were transported to the hospital in private vehicles by visitors who survived the attack. ISIS claimed responsibility for the attack.

== See also ==
- List of terrorist incidents linked to Islamic State – Khorasan Province
- List of wars and battles involving ISIL
- List of terrorist incidents in November 2016
- List of terrorist incidents linked to ISIL
- Military intervention against ISIL
- Terrorist incidents in Pakistan in 2016
- Timeline of ISIL-related events (2016)
