= December 2016 Aden suicide bombings =

Terrorist attacks in Aden, Yemen in December 2016

- Part of the Aden unrest and the Yemeni Civil War (2014–present)
- Location of Aden Governorate in Yemen.
- Location: Al Solban military camp, Aden, Aden Governorate, Yemen
- Date: 10 and 18 December 2016
- Target: Yemeni soldiers
- Attack type: Suicide bombings
- Deaths: Total: 102+: 10 December: 50; 18 December: 52+
- Injuries: Total: 93+: 10 December: 29; 18 December: 63+
- Perpetrator: Islamic State – Yemen Province

The December 2016 Aden suicide bombings were terrorist attacks that occurred on 10 December and 18 December 2016 targeted on Yemeni soldiers in Aden, the responsibility of bombing was claimed by Islamic State of Iraq and the Levant group, according to Amaq news agency. The suicide bombing occurred in a gathering of soldiers who were to receive their salaries on 10 December 2016. The blasts took place at same military base camps on 18 December 2016.

== Bombings ==
=== 10 December 2016 bombing ===
At least 48 Yemeni soldiers were killed and another 29 were injured in a suicide bombing attack in Aden on 10 December. The Islamic State of Iraq and the Levant in Yemen claimed responsibility for the attack.

=== 18 December 2016 bombing ===
A second, similar, suicide bombing occurred eight days later on 18 December. At least 52 soldiers were killed and more than 60 others were injured. The suicide bomber was identified as Abu Hashim al-Radfani who had detonated the explosive vest amid gathering of soldiers. The statement was claimed and posted via Amaq news agency. The agency had posted pictures of the attack, and one showing young man wearing a white vest standing next to the black and white Islamic State flag.

== See also ==
- List of Islamist terrorist attacks
- List of terrorist incidents in December 2016
- List of terrorist incidents linked to ISIL
- Number of terrorist incidents by country
- Timeline of ISIL-related events (2016)
