= 2014 Hillah bombing =

Terrorist incident in Iraq

- Location: Hillah, Iraq
- Date: 9 March 2014
- Deaths: 45
- Injuries: 157

A suicide mini-bus bomber detonated his bus filled with explosives at a northern checkpoint in the Shi'ite town of Hilla in southern Iraq, trapping civilians in their vehicles, where they were killed or seriously injured as the explosion destroyed over 50 vehicles near the mini-bus. Although no one claimed responsibility for the attack, a provincial official claimed that the attack was the work of Al-Qaeda. 45 people were killed and at least 157 others were wounded.
