= Umm Sayyaf =

Widow of Abu Sayyaf

- Born: Nasrin As'ad Ibrahim نسرين أسعد إبراهيم; Iraq
- Arrested: May 16, 2015; Eastern Syria; Delta Force
- Citizenship: Iraq
- Charge(s): Participation in the sexual abuse of two Yazidi children and participation in the alleged conspiracy to murder Kayla Mueller
- Penalty: Life imprisonment
- Status: Currently jailed in Iraqi Kurdistan
- Spouse: Abu Sayyaf

Nasrin As'ad Ibrahim (Arabic: نسرين أسعد إبراهيم), better known by the nom de guerre Umm Sayyaf (Arabic: ام سياف), is the widow of Abu Sayyaf. She was captured in May 2015 by US Delta Force soldiers on the mission where they killed her husband, a suspected leader of the Islamic State.

During the raid Delta Force soldiers were also reported to have rescued a young Yazidi woman the couple had been keeping as a slave. National Security Council spokesperson Bernadette Meehan stated, "We suspect that Umm Sayyaf is a member of ISIL, played an important role in ISIL's terrorist activities, and may have been complicit in the enslavement of the young woman rescued last night."

Umm Sayyaf is believed to be an Iraqi citizen.

Initial reports said that she was in US custody in Iraq. On August 6, 2015 Umm Sayyaf was turned over to the Kurdish regional authorities in Erbil. James Gordon Meek, of ABC News noted some American prosecutors wanted to try to prosecute her in the US justice system. He characterized the Kurdish justice system as being "known for lightning-swift justice."

According to John Knefel, reporting for Al Jazeera, legal critics have challenged the Obama administration for a lack of transparency over the justification for holding Umm Sayyaf in extrajudicial detention. He said, "The administration's secrecy surrounding the conditions of her imprisonment have led some lawyers and legal analysis to raise questions about what rights and protections she's being afforded, and what policy guidelines will govern treatment of new detainees in what some now refer to as the Forever War."

The family of American hostage Kayla Mueller reported that they had been told that, during her captivity, she was imprisoned by Abu Sayyaf and Umm Sayyaf and sexually abused by Abu Sayyaf before she was taken as a wife and sexually abused by Abu Bakr al-Baghdadi. Yazidi girls, who had been held as sex slaves by Abu Sayyaf, and who later escaped, were the first to report that Mueller was also sexually abused before her death. Interrogation of various individuals by intelligence officials seemed to indicate that al-Baghdadi had been Mueller's primary abuser.

On February 8, 2016, Sayyaf was charged by American prosecutors in Virginia with providing material support to a foreign terrorist organization that resulted in a person's death. The federal charge carries a maximum sentence of life imprisonment.

In May 2019, it was reported that she had been cooperating with the CIA and Kurdish intelligence in the hunt for al-Baghdadi.
