= Al-Akirshi =

Al-Akirshi العكيرشي
- Village
- Location in Syria
- Coordinates: 35°51′25.61″N 39°7′52.37″E
- Country: Syria
- Governorate: Raqqa Governorate
- District: Raqqa District
- Subdistrict: Al-Sabkhah Subdistrict

Population (2004)
  - Total: 4,304
- Time zone: UTC+3 (EET)
  - Summer (DST): UTC+2 (EEST)
- City Qrya Pcode: C5752

Al-Akirshi or Uqayrishah (Arabic: العكيرشي, romanized: al-ʿUkayrishī) is a Syrian village in the Raqqa District in Raqqa Governorate. According to the Syria Central Bureau of Statistics (CBS), Al-Akirshi had a population of 4,304 in the 2004 census.
