= Kayla Mueller =

American aid worker and ISIS captive (1988–2015)

- Born: Kayla Jean Mueller; August 14, 1988; Prescott, Arizona, U.S.
- Died: February 6, 2015 (aged 26); Raqqa, Syria
- Education: Northern Arizona University (BA)
- Occupations: Human rights activist; humanitarian aid worker

Kayla Jean Mueller (August 14, 1988 – February 6, 2015) was an American human rights activist and humanitarian aid worker from Prescott, Arizona. She was taken captive in August 2013 in Aleppo, Syria, after leaving a Doctors Without Borders hospital. Media reported that a 26-year-old American aid worker was being held by ISIS without naming her, at her family's request. In 2015, she was killed in uncertain circumstances. The operation that killed ISIS leader Abu Bakr al-Baghdadi was named Operation Kayla Mueller in her honor.

== Early life, activism and humanitarian aid ==
Mueller was a native of Prescott, Arizona. After graduating from Tri-City College Prep High School in 2007, she attended Northern Arizona University in Flagstaff to study political science.

Mueller was a practicing Christian. As a college student, she was active in an ecumenical Christian campus ministry, United Christian Ministries. She was also interested in Bhakti yoga.

Mueller supported a variety of humanitarian aid and human rights initiatives. Her involvement in human rights activism and humanitarian aid included working in India with Tibetan refugees. Her work in the Middle East included volunteering for the pro-Palestinian activist group the International Solidarity Movement and helping African refugees in Israel with the African Refugees Development Center. Other humanitarian and activist causes Mueller was involved in at home and abroad were Vrindavan Food For Life, which provides free food, education, and medical care for those in need; and during college, Food Not Bombs.

== Abduction by ISIS ==
Mueller started working in southern Turkey in December 2012, where she was assisting Syrian refugees. On August 3, 2013, she traveled to the northern Syrian city of Aleppo with her boyfriend, a Syrian contractor hired to install communications equipment at the Doctors Without Borders hospital in Aleppo.

Although Mueller had been working with international aid agency Support to Life in Turkey, this was not a work-related trip. Doctors Without Borders staff were "flabbergasted" at Mueller's arrival, fearing for her safety, as Syria was dangerous for international aid workers amid a civil war. The following day, Doctors Without Borders staff tried to drive Mueller to a bus station so she could travel back to Turkey. The car was ambushed, and both Mueller and her boyfriend were abducted by ISIS. Her boyfriend was freed 20 days later.

== Captivity and unsuccessful rescue attempt ==
The US military and Mueller's family attempted to rescue Mueller several times, devoting considerable resources to the search. In July 2014, US special operations forces (from Delta Force and 75th Ranger Regiment) raided an abandoned oil refinery near Raqqa in an unsuccessful attempt to find reporter James Foley (whom ISIS later murdered) and other hostages. The commandos found evidence that the hostages had recently been held there, finding writing on the cell walls and hair believed to be Mueller's, but the refinery was empty.

A Mueller family spokesman said that Mueller's parents "often communicated with the White House in trying to free their daughter." In the summer of 2014, as other options were exhausted, Mueller's parents asked President Barack Obama in a letter to consider trading her for Aafia Siddiqui, a convicted felon serving 86 years in federal prison having been found guilty of attempted murder and armed assault after a lengthy and widely publicized trial that stirred controversy in her country of birth, Pakistan; Siddiqui's release has been a long-sought demand of ISIS and al-Qaeda. The proposed exchange did not take place; the Obama administration had also rejected demands from other militant groups to exchange Siddiqui.

Catherine Herridge of Fox News reported via anonymous sources that the location of Mueller and other American hostages was known by the White House in May 2014. However, a decision regarding a rescue mission was not made for seven weeks, because the White House had asked for further intelligence to be obtained. By that time, the hostages had been dispersed.

In August 2015, six months after her death, the New York Times reported that Mueller had been forced into marriage to Abu Bakr al-Baghdadi, the leader of ISIS, who had raped her repeatedly. She had also been tortured.

It was also reported in May 2015 that Mueller had been a "personal captive" of Abu Sayyaf. In August 2015, ABC News reported that Abu Sayyaf's widow, Umm Sayyaf, had confirmed that al-Baghdadi had been Mueller's primary abuser.

Fellow captives who were released or escaped reported Mueller's strength and compassion. She was concerned for the safety of others, even intentionally passing up an escape attempt to give other women a better chance at freedom. After months of prolonged torture and abuse, ISIS members, who are known for their persecution of Christians, attempted to use her as propaganda by claiming she had abandoned the Christian faith in front of other prisoners who were men, but she denied it. Daniel Rye Ottosen, a Danish freelance photographer and fellow captive, said that the men in the room "...were impressed by the strength that she showed in front of us. That was very clear."

== Death ==
On February 6, 2015, a media account affiliated with ISIS released a statement claiming that a female American hostage held by the group was killed by one of around a dozen Jordanian airstrikes in Raqqa. The statement came just days after the release of a video showing the burning alive of a Jordanian fighter pilot, Muath al-Kasasbeh, by ISIS and the subsequent execution of Sajida Mubarak Atrous al-Rishawi and other prisoners of Jordan. The statement was later translated by the SITE Intelligence Group, identifying the hostage as Mueller. Another statement by ISIS claimed Mueller was killed in an American airstrike.

As part of the statement, ISIS published a photo of a damaged building, alleging that Mueller had been killed in a Jordanian airstrike of the building, where she had been left alone with no guards, but no proof of death was provided. The Pentagon agreed the building was one hit in the bombings, but disputed that Mueller or any other civilian had been inside at the time. The site had been bombed by the coalition twice before, and was targeted again because ISIS soldiers sometimes return to bombed sites, thinking the coalition would not bomb those sites again, according to Pentagon spokesman John Kirby. After this, Mueller's name was released by American and other media with the family's consent.

On February 10, 2015, Mueller's family announced ISIS had confirmed her death to them in an e-mail, with three photographs of her dead body, bruised on the face and wearing a black hijab. National Security Council spokeswoman Bernadette Meehan said this message was authenticated by the intelligence community.

On August 24, 2016, ABC News reported that Doctors Without Borders had declined to help negotiate her release. Doctors Without Borders then issued a statement (since deleted but archived) to the effect that they felt constrained in their available actions by the complexities of the larger situation and their general lack of expertise in hostage negotiation.

In November 2019, the New York Times reported that Mueller may have been executed on the orders of Abu Bakr al-Baghdadi, according to reports from the wife of a close associate of his.

In February 2024, Asma Mohammed, the widow and first wife of ISIS leader al-Baghdadi, expressed her doubts and skepticism regarding the accuracy of the group's narrative on the death of Kayla Mueller.

== Legal proceedings ==
On February 8, 2016, Umm Sayyaf was charged by American prosecutors in Virginia with providing material support to a foreign terrorist organization that resulted in a person's death. The federal charge carries a maximum sentence of life imprisonment. She remains in Iraqi custody on terrorism-related charges.

In October 2020, Alexanda Kotey and El Shafee Elsheikh were extradited to the US and charged in Mueller's murder. Kotey pleaded guilty to four counts of hostage-taking resulting in death and was sentenced to life in prison without parole in 2022. Elsheikh was convicted at trial and received eight concurrent life sentences without the possibility of parole.

== Reactions ==
=== Family ===
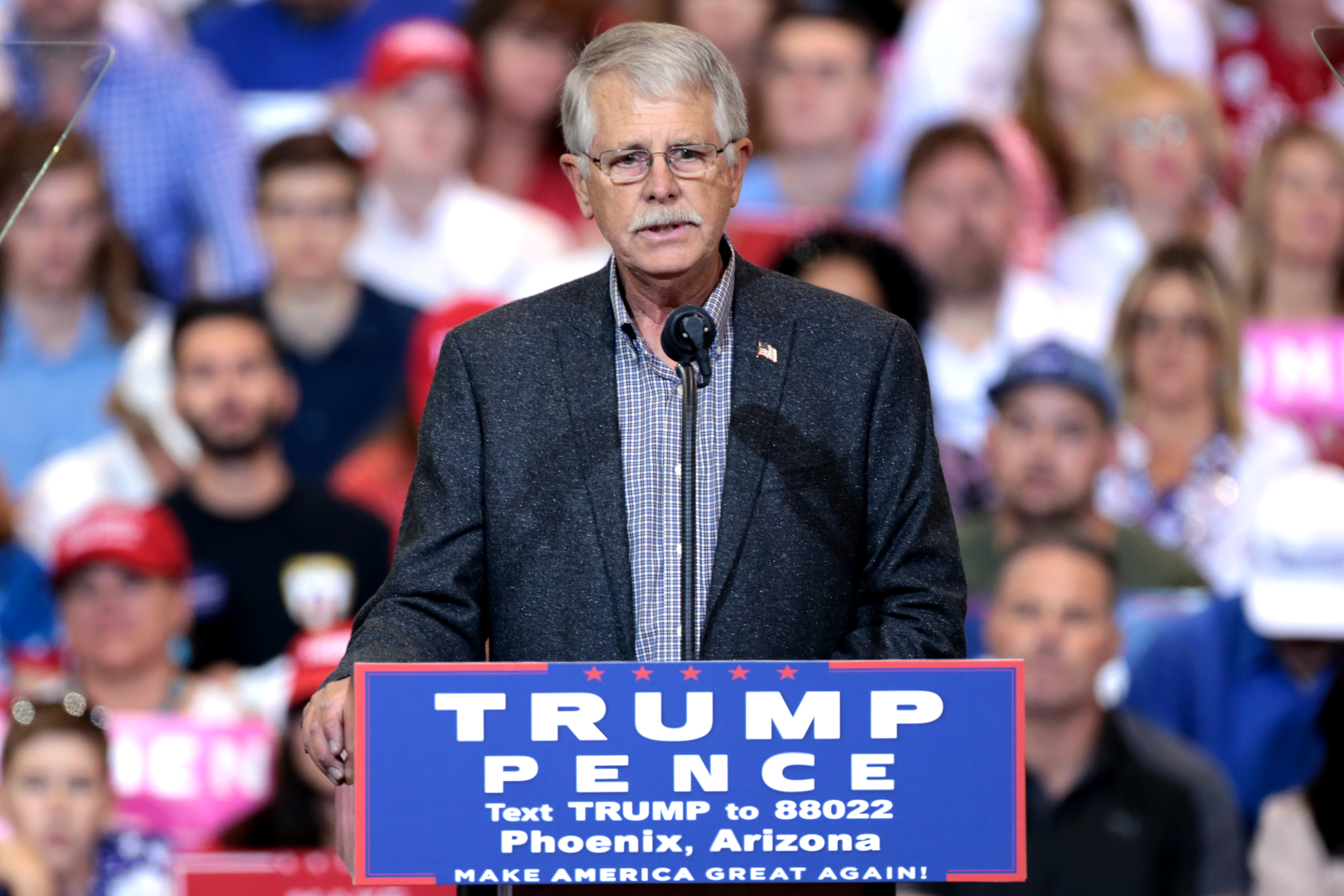
Carl Mueller speaking at a rally for Donald Trump in Arizona, October 2016.

Mueller's parents reportedly implored ISIS to contact them, as they hoped their daughter might still be alive. "We have sent you a private message and ask that you respond to us privately," Carl and Marsha Mueller said in a statement. They said they had not talked to the media, as ISIS warned them not to. Later, in an interview on The Today Show, Carl Mueller expressed his frustration with the Obama administration over the way it conducted negotiations with their daughter's captors, and their policy of not paying ransom money for hostages. "We understand the policy about not paying ransom, but on the other hand, any parents out there would understand that you would want anything and everything done to bring your child home," Mueller said. "And we tried, and we asked. But they put policy in front of American citizens' lives. And it didn't get it changed." On February 6, 2020, Kayla Mueller's parents were publicly recognized by President Donald Trump during the 2020 State of the Union Address.

=== Church ===
Kayla Mueller was a member of an ecumenical Christian campus ministry, United Christian Ministries, which held ties to the Presbyterian Church. The denomination stated: "Each of us is called in our own way to make the world a better place and manifest the love of Christ to those around us. Kayla did that in a very profound and tangible way, and my hope is that she inspires others to alleviate suffering in the world and in their own communities."

Hare Krishna Food for Life, for which Mueller was an active volunteer, stated: "Our prayers go out to her family and friends, a wonderful soul who was making a real difference in many people’s lives. Sure she has gone on to a better life in the spiritual realm."

=== Government ===
An American official cautioned that without proof of Mueller's death, the statement by ISIS could be a ploy to cause the Jordanians and the rest of the American-led coalition to refrain from any heavier airstrikes.

Jordan's Foreign Minister Nasser Judeh called ISIS's claim "an old and sick trick" on Twitter. "So they behead innocent #US #UK & Japan hostages & BURN a brave #Jordan pilot ALIVE & now a hostage is killed by an airstrike? Sure! Sick!", he said. He further tweeted: "An old and sick trick used by terrorists and despots for decades: claiming that hostages human shields held captive are killed by air raids." Later upon confirmation of Mueller's death, he tweeted: "Saddened & angered to hear news confirming killing of #US hostage #kaylaMueller. Yet another ugly example of these terrorists' brutality."

After many Western news outlets cast doubt on the claim of the hostage death and the extremists' ability to identify Jordanian and U.S.-made F-16 Fighting Falcons flying at high altitudes, Jordan dismissed the claim of a killed hostage as an ISIS publicity stunt and a lie, as the group is known for its propaganda techniques.

After Mueller's family confirmed her death, President Barack Obama said "[Mueller] represents what is best about America, and expressed her deep pride in the freedoms that we Americans enjoy, and that so many others strive for around the world." United States Secretary of State John Kerry issued a statement saying "ISIS, and ISIS alone, is the reason Kayla is gone."

The Pentagon declined to investigate whether Mueller was killed by the coalition airstrike. Policy dictates that the US only investigates reports of civilian casualties when they come from a "credible source", which ISIS is not.

=== Recognition ===
In October 2015, Mueller became the first person to be posthumously inducted into Northern Arizona University's college of Social and Behavioral Sciences Hall of Fame. She was recognized as an outstanding alumna for her humanitarian aid work.

The military operation that killed ISIS leader Abu Bakr al-Baghdadi on October 27, 2019, was code-named after Kayla Mueller, according to several sources.

On February 4, 2020, during the 2020 State of the Union Address, President Donald Trump personally recognized Mueller as part of his discussion of tackling ISIS insurgent forces and the military operations directed at taking down prominent members under his administration, directly referencing the Barisha raid in which ISIS leader Abu Bakr al-Baghdadi was killed. During this recognition, he also directly referenced Mueller's parents, Carl and Marsha Mueller, who were in attendance at the address. Several aspects of Mueller's life were mentioned, including her college career, her devotion to humanitarian aid and personal faith, as well as her capture, torture and eventual death at the hands of ISIS terrorists.

Carl and Marsha Mueller spoke at the 2020 Republican National Convention, where they described their daughter's ordeal and praised the Trump administration's coordination of the raid that led to the killing of al-Baghdadi.

== See also ==
- 2014 American intervention in Syria
- Austin Tice
- Daniel Pearl
- Foreign hostages in Iraq
- James Foley
- John Cantlie
- List of kidnappings
- Lists of solved missing person cases
- Kenneth Bigley
- Mohammed Emwazi, Kuwaiti-British terrorist who beheaded Foley
- Nick Berg
- Death of Abu Bakr al-Baghdadi, United States military operation code-named after Kayla Mueller
- Steven Sotloff
- The Beatles, terrorist cell of ISIS that held Foley and eventually beheaded him
