= Abu Sayyaf (Islamic State leader) =

Tunisian Islamist terrorist (died 2015)

- ابو سياف

Emir of Energy Islamic State
- In office 201? (Note: It is unknown what year exactly Abu Sayyaf was made overseer of gas and oil operations.) – 16 May 2015
- Preceded by: Unknown
- Succeeded by: Unknown

Personal details
- Born: Fathi bin Awn bin Jildi Murad al-Tunisi فتحي بن عون بن الجلدي مراد التونسي Tunisia
- Died: May 16, 2015 Eastern Syria
- Citizenship: Tunisia
- Spouse: Umm Sayyaf
- Parent: Awn bin Jildi Murad (father)
- Occupation: Islamist militant
- Nickname: Abu Sayyaf

Military service
- Allegiance: Islamic State
- Years of service: 20?? (Note: It is unknown when Abu Sayyaf joined the Islamic State.)-2015
- Battles/wars: Syrian civil war

Fathi bin Awn bin Jildi Murad al-Tunisi (Arabic: فتحي بن عون بن الجلدي مراد التونسي), also known by the nom de guerre Abu Sayyaf (Arabic: ابو سياف), was a Tunisian senior leader of the Islamic State (IS) who was described as overseeing gas and oil operations. Abu Sayyaf was killed on the night of May 15–16, 2015 while resisting capture during a United States Army Delta Force operation in eastern Syria.

== Death ==
The operation was conducted to try to capture him and his wife on suspicion of their involvement in, or "deep knowledge" of Islamic State hostage operations. Kayla Mueller is reported to have been a "personal captive" of Abu Sayyaf. No U.S. soldiers were killed or injured during the operation.

It was the first direct action ground raid targeting the militant group by U.S. soldiers inside Syria. (a previous U.S. ground operation in Syria was a rescue mission). Items, including several terabytes of data from laptops, cellphones and other material, were recovered from the scene and exploited for intelligence purposes. More information was collected in the raid than any other in United States special operations forces history. Among the objects found there are archaeological finds, which prove the involvement of IS in illicit antiquities trade. The operation was launched from Iraq, with the "full consent of Iraqi authorities."

A senior administration official said that the administration had assessed it likely that Abu Sayyaf was in direct contact with Islamic State leader and self-proclaimed caliph, Abu Bakr al-Baghdadi.

Abu Sayyaf's wife, known by the nom de guerre "Umm Sayyaf" and said to be an IS member, was captured during the operation. A young Yazidi woman who appeared to be held as a slave of the couple was freed.

A senior administration official told CNN that Abu Sayyaf was a Tunisian citizen. Hisham al-Hashimi, an Iraqi researcher on IS and security threats, said that al-Jabouri was "a close associate of chief IS spokesman Abu Mohammed al-Adnani."

On 19 May 2015, United States authorities identified Abu Sayyaf's real name as Fathi Ben Awn Ben Jildi Murad al-Tunisi.
