= February 2013 Kirkuk attack =

Terrorist incident in Iraq

At 9:15 am on 3 February 2013, a suicide truck bombing occurred in Kirkuk, northern Iraq. The bomber triggered the blast near a side entrance to the city's police headquarters, demolishing part of a nearby government office and leaving a large crater in the street. Insurgents armed with AK-47s, grenades and explosive belts, who were disguised as police officers, were killed by guards as they tried to charge into the police building. Police stated that 33 people were killed, including 12 employees of the government office. Medical sources gave the death toll as 16. About 90 other people were injured.

Many other major attacks have occurred in Kirkuk, including in 2007, 2009, January 2013, April 2013, December 2013, 2016 and 2019. There was an uprising in 1991, as well as battles in 1733, 2014, 2015, 2016 and 2017.
