= List of terrorist incidents linked to the Islamic State =

The following is a list of terrorist attacks and arrests that have been connected to or have been claimed in reliable sources to be inspired by the Islamic State (IS), also known by other names.

Attacks done by IS as a group Attacks inspired by IS Terror attacks committed or inspired by IS as of June 2025

Islamic State's predecessor organization, Islamic State of Iraq (ISI) was established in October 2006, after the dissolution of the insurgent groups fighting under the coalition of Mujahideen Shura Council. Under the leadership of its first Emir Abu Omar al-Baghdadi, ISI was in the Iraqi insurgency against American-led occupation. After the withdrawal of U.S. troops from Iraq, ISI, then-led by Abu Bakr al-Baghdadi, continued its insurgency against the Iraqi government. In April 2013, the group officially changed its name to "Islamic State of Iraq and Levant" and established a presence in Syria.

Between June 2014, when the group self-proclaimed itself to be the Islamic State, and February 2018, IS has often made claims of responsibility over 140 terrorist attacks in 29 countries outside Syria and Iraq, that were "conducted or inspired" by the group, while the evidences of those claims are not verified. Hundreds of other attacks were also carried out since 2018.

Attacks are categorized as directed, enabled or inspired by the Islamic State. Directed attacks have included the November 2015 Paris attacks and 2016 Brussels bombings. Enabled attacks, which were guided through the internet, included the Hypercacher kosher supermarket siege and the Curtis Culwell Center attack. In the 'inspired' category, lone wolf attackers have been radicalized through online propaganda; these include the 2016 Nice truck attack and the 2017 Westminster attack.

== Attacks by Islamic State of Iraq: 2006–2012 ==
The following is a list of alleged and confirmed attacks carried out by the Islamic State of Iraq organization between 2006 and 2012:

- The 18 April 2007 Baghdad bombings were a series of attacks that occurred when five car bombs exploded across Baghdad, the capital city of Iraq, on 18 April 2007, killing nearly 200 people. No group claimed responsibility for the attacks. US defense secretary Robert Gates, delivering remarks from Tel Aviv, claimed that Islamic State of Iraq might have perpetrated the attacks.
- The Qahtaniyah bombings occurred at around 8pm local time on August 14, 2007, when four co-ordinated suicide bomb attacks detonated in the Kurdish towns of Kahtaniya and Jazeera (Siba Sheikh Khidir), near Mosul. Iraqi Red Crescent's estimates say the bombs killed 796 and wounded 1,562 people, making this the Iraq War's most deadly car bomb attack. No group claimed responsibility for the attack. US military officials alleged that the attacks were launched by ISI fighters.
- The August 2009 Baghdad bombings were three coordinated car bomb attacks and a number of mortar strikes in the Iraqi capital, Baghdad.
- On 25 October 2009, Baghdad bombings there were bombings in Baghdad which killed 155 people and injured at least 721 people.
- The April 2010 Baghdad bombings were a series of bomb attacks in Baghdad, Iraq that killed at least 85 people over two days. Nouri al-Maliki alleged that the attacks were carried out by the Islamic State of Iraq.
- The 10 May 2010 Iraq attacks were a series of bomb and shooting attacks that occurred in Iraq on 10 May 2010, killing over 100 people and injuring 350, the highest death toll for a single day in Iraq in 2010. Iraqi officials alleged that Islamic State of Iraq (ISI) group carried out the attacks in retaliation against the killing of ISI's two high-ranking leaders of U.S. and Iraqi forces.
- The 2 November 2010 Baghdad bombings were a series of bomb attacks in Baghdad, Iraq, that killed more than 110 people. While the Islamic State of Iraq did not officially claim responsibility for the attacks, a U.S. military spokesperson alleged that ISI-affiliated fighters might have carried out the attacks.
- The January 2011 Iraq suicide attacks were a series of three consecutive suicide bombings in Iraq which left at least 133 dead.

== 2013 ==
Country	Date	Article	Description	Dead	Injured	Status
Iraq	January 2013		A car bomb killed 28 Shia pilgrims and injured 60 others as they were returning from Karbala, while in the capital Baghdad a roadside bomb exploded near a minibus, killing four pilgrims and wounding 15 others.	32	75	
Iraq	January 2013		Two suicide bombing attacks killed 55 and wounded 288 in Baghdad, Tikrit and Kirkuk.	55	288	
Iraq	January 2013		A suicide bomber blew himself up during a funeral for a politician's relative in the city of Tuz Khurmatu, killing 42 and leaving 75 others wounded.	42	75	
Iraq	February 2013	February 2013 Kirkuk attack	A suicide car bombing at the provincial police HQ in Kirkuk killed 36 and injured 105 others, including the city's chief of police.	42	111	
Iraq	February 2013		A series of car bombs struck Baghdad, killing 37 and injured more than 130 others.	37	130	
Iraq	February 2013		A string of bombings and shootings killed 34 and injured 70 others in Iraq.	34	70	
Iraq	March 2013	Akashat ambush	IS fighters ambushed a Syrian Army convoy escorted by Iraqi soldiers, killing 51 Syrians and 13 Iraqis.	64	10	
Iraq	March 2013	19 March 2013 Iraq attacks	A series of coordinated bombings and shootings across central and northern Iraq killed 98 people and left 240 wounded.	98	240	
Iraq	April 2013	15 April 2013 Iraq attacks	A series of 70 attacks, mostly car bombings and shootings, occur across 20 cities in Iraq.	75	356	Some perpetrators killed, others escaped
Iraq	April 2013	2013 Hawija clashes	Four days of shootings, bombings and clashes in and around Hawija after the Iraqi Army tried to arrest protestors	331	600+	Some perpetrators killed, others escaped
Iraq	May 2013	May 2013 Iraq attacks	Dozens of attacks rock several cities in Iraq in a week long outbreak of violence.	449	732	Some perpetrators killed, others escaped
Iraq	June 2013	10 June 2013 Iraq attacks	A series of bombings strike nine cities in northern and central Iraq	94	289	Some perpetrators killed, others escaped
Iraq	June 2013	16 June 2013 Iraq attacks	A series of bombings and shootings targeting various cities across Iraq	54	174	Some perpetrators killed, others escaped
Iraq	December 2013	2013 Baghdad Christmas Day bombings	Three bombings in Baghdad targeting Christians on Christmas Day	38	70	Unknown

== 2014 ==
Country	Date	Article	Description	Dead	Injured	Status
Belgium	May 2014	Jewish Museum of Belgium shooting	The Jewish Museum of Belgium in Brussels, Belgium was targeted when a gunman identified as Mehdi Nemmouche opened fire at the museum. Three people died at the scene while a fourth died on 6 June due to injuries. When apprehended in Marseille, with his belongings was a camera with a recording claiming responsibility for the shooting, and a white sheet with the name of the Islamic State emblazoned onto it.	4	0	Subject in custody, extradited to Belgium.
Iraq	June 2014	Badush prison massacre	On 10 June, ISIL militants massacred at least 670 Shia prisoners in Badush prison, Mosul, Iraq.	1000+	Unknown	
Iraq	June 2014	Camp Speicher massacre	On 12 June 2014, ISIL killed at least 1,566 Shia Iraqi Air Force cadets in an attack on Camp Speicher in Tikrit. At the time of the attack there were between 4,000 and 11,000 unarmed cadets in the camp. This is the second deadliest terrorist attack in history and the deadliest attack conducted by ISIL.	1566–1700	Unknown	In retaliation Iraqi government launched counter offences against ISIL. New mass graves of ISIL victims were also discovered in Tikrit.
Australia	September 2014	2014 Endeavour Hills stabbings	Two counter-terrorism police officers stabbed.	0	2	Perpetrator shot dead.
Australia	September 2014	2014 Australian counter-terrorism raids	15 people were detained after planning to kidnap a random Australian citizen and execute them.	0	0	Fifteen people were detained and 11 people were subsequently charged with terrorism offences, one of whom is now held at the Goulburn Correctional Centre in Goulburn, New South Wales.
Canada	October 2014	2014 Saint-Jean-sur-Richelieu ramming attack	Two soldiers run down with car, one fatally injured.	1	1	Perpetrator shot dead after chase.
Canada	October 2014	2014 shootings at Parliament Hill, Ottawa	Soldier standing guard at National War Memorial shot dead. Gunman storms Parliament. Security officer shot in leg trying to take gun from perpetrator.	1	3	Perpetrator shot dead in Parliament Building.
United States	October 2014	2014 Queens hatchet attack	A recent convert to Islam and IS supporter attacks two police officers with a hatchet. A civilian is wounded when other officers attempt to shoot the attacker.	0	3	Perpetrator shot dead by police
France	December 2014	2014 Tours police station stabbing	An IS supporter entered into a police station in Joué-lès-Tours screaming "Allahu Akbar" before stabbing three police officers.	0	3	Perpetrator shot dead.
Australia	December 2014	Lindt Cafe siege	An IS supporter who pledged allegiance to the group held 18 hostages at a café at the APA Building in Martin Place, Sydney, Australia. One hostage was murdered during the siege and one killed by a bullet ricochet from a police officer during the subsequent raid.	2	4	Perpetrator shot dead by police during raid.

== 2015 ==
Country	Date	Article	Description	Dead	Injured	Status
Saudi Arabia	January 2015	2015 Arar attack	Two attackers open fire on border guards, killing 3 before one detonates his suicide vest	3 (+2)	1	Both perpetrators killed
France	January 2015	Hypercacher kosher supermarket siege	An attacker killed five people, one of them the day before, and took fifteen others hostage	5	9	Perpetrator killed
Libya	January 2015	2015 Corinthia Hotel attack	Car bombing, suicide attack and subsequent hostage situation in hotel known for hosting foreigners and government officials.	10	7	Some perpetrators dead, others escaped
Denmark	February 2015	2015 Copenhagen shootings	Danish-born Jordanian-Palestinian Omar Abdel Hamid El-Hussein opened fire on a free speech event hosted by Lars Vilks and the Great Synagogue of Copenhagen. El-Hussein had pledged allegiance to IS leader Abu Bakr al-Baghdadi a few days prior.	2 (+1)	5	Perpetrator shot by police
Tunisia	March 2015	Bardo National Museum attack	Mass shooting and hostage-taking of foreign tourists at the Bardo National Museum	22 (+2)	42	2 perpetrators killed by police, 1 escaped
Yemen	March 2015	2015 Sana'a mosque bombings	Suicide bombings of two Shi'a mosques in Sana'a	142	351	All perpetrators killed in the explosions
Saudi Arabia	May 2015	Qatif and Dammam mosque bombings	The mosque bombings occurred on 22 and 29 May 2015. On Friday May 22, a suicide bomber attacked the Shia "Imam Ali ibn Abi Talib Mosque" situated in Qudeih village of Qatif city in Eastern Province, Saudi Arabia, which killed at least 21 people. The event is the second deadly attack against Shia in six months.	26	106	IS claimed responsibility for the blast.
United States	May 2015	Curtis Culwell Center attack	Two men attacked officers with gunfire at the entrance to an exhibit featuring cartoon images of Muhammad at the Curtis Culwell Center in Garland, Texas	0 (+2)	1	Both perpetrators killed
Turkey	June 2015	2015 Diyarbakır rally bombing	TNT bombing targeting a rally of the Peoples' Democratic Party	5	100+	Perpetrator arrested.
Syria	June 2015	2015 Kobani Massacre	ISIS strike on the Kurdish city of Kobani, close to the border of Turkey, killing over 200 civilians	223+	300+	
France	June 2015	Saint-Quentin-Fallavier attack	French-born Islamist beheads his boss and then rams his car into a gas cylinder outside a factory	1	2	
Kuwait	June 2015	2015 Kuwait mosque bombing	Suicide bombing of a Shi'a mosque in Kuwait City	27	227	
Tunisia	June 2015	2015 Sousse attacks	Mass shooting targeting western tourists at a hotel in Port El Kantaoui 10 kilometres north of Sousse	38 (+1)	39	Perpetrator killed by police
Iraq	July 2015	2015 Khan Bani Saad bombing	Suicide car bombing targeting Shi'a market in the city of Khan Bani Saad	130 (+1)	130+	Perpetrator killed in explosion
Turkey	July 2015	2015 Suruç bombing	Suicide bombing targeting the youth wing of the Socialist Party of the Oppressed	33 (+1)	104	Perpetrator dead.
France	August 2015	2015 Thalys train attack	A man who supported IS attacked a Thalys train from Paris to Amsterdam before being subdued.	0	3 (+1)	Perpetrator subdued and arrested.
Turkey	October 2015	2015 Ankara bombings	Suicide bombing targeting protesters at a peace rally	109	400+	Perpetrators dead.
Egypt / Russia	October 2015	Metrojet Flight 9268	Flight en route from Egypt to Saint Petersburg bombed	224	0	Unknown
United States	November 2015	University of California, Merced stabbing attack	A man stabbed multiple people on the University of California, Merced campus before being killed by law enforcement	0 (+1)	4	Perpetrator was inspired by ISIS
Lebanon	November 2015	2015 Beirut bombings	Suicide bombings targeting Shi'a civilians in the Hezbollah dominated suburb Bourj el-Barajneh	43 (+3)	200–240	Perpetrators dead.
France	November 2015	November 2015 Paris attacks	Shootings, suicide bombings, grenade, hostage taking.	130 (+7)	416+	Perpetrators killed
Tunisia	November 2015	2015 Tunis bombing	Suicide bombing targeting a bus carrying presidential guards.	13 (+1)	16	Perpetrator killed in explosion.
United States	December 2015	2015 San Bernardino attack	Married couple Rizwan Farook and Tashfeen Malik open fire on a holiday at the Inland Regional Center before fleeing. The wife swore allegiance to Abu Bakr al-Baghdadi in a Facebook post the day of the massacre	14 (+2)	24	Perpetrators shot and killed by police
Syria	December 2015	Tell Tamer bombings	Truck bombings of a Kurdish militia hospital and a market.	60	80	Unknown
Syria	December 2015	2015 al-Qamishli bombings	Suicide bombings in three restaurants frequented by Kurds and Assyrian Christians.	16	35	Perpetrators killed in explosions

== 2016 ==
Country	Date	Article	Description	Dead	Injured	Status
Israel	January 2016	January 2016 Tel Aviv shooting	An Arab Israeli man shot three civilians dead and injured seven others	3	7	Perpetrator killed by Israeli security forces after the attack had concluded
Libya	January 2016	Zliten truck bombing	Suicide truck bombing at a police training camp	60	200+	Perpetrator killed in explosion
Egypt	January 2016	2016 Hurghada attack	Stabbing attack targeting foreign tourists at the Bella Vista hotel in Hurghada	0	2	Two perpetrators killed by police
Turkey	January 2016	January 2016 Istanbul bombing	Suicide bombing targeting foreign tourists in Sultanahmet Square	13	14	Perpetrator killed in explosion
Indonesia	January 2016	2016 Jakarta attacks	Suicide bombings and shootout targeting a Starbucks and a police station in central Jakarta. The attacks occurred near the UN offices and several foreign embassies	4	24	Four perpetrators killed, others escaped
Saudi Arabia	January 2016	Mahasen mosque attack	Suicide bombing and shooting targeting a Shi'a mosque	4	18	One perpetrator killed; other arrested
Nigeria	January 2016	2016 Dalori attack	At least 86 people were murdered in the Dalori Village by Boko Haram fighters. Boko Haram was part of the Islamic State at the time of the attack.	86+	62+	Unknown
Nigeria	February 2016	Dikwa suicide bombings	Five suicide bombers infiltrated a camp disguised as refugees. Two set off their bombs as internally displaced persons were queuing for rations. More than 60 were killed and 78 others injured.	60+	78	2 killed
Syria	February 2016	February 2016 Homs bombings	Two car bombings in Homs targeting Alawite civilians	64	100+	Unknown
Syria	February 2016	February 2016 Sayyidah Zaynab bombings	Car bombing and two suicide bombings targeting the Sayyidah Zaynab Mosque, a Shi'a mosque believed to contain the grave of Muhammad's granddaughter.	83	178	Perpetrators killed by explosions
Turkey	March 2016	March 2016 Istanbul bombing	A suicide bomber exploded targeting civilians in a commercial shop on a busy tourist destination and business center.	4	36	Perpetrator killed by explosion
Belgium	March 2016	2016 Brussels bombings	Suicide bombers attacked a metro station and an airport	32	340	Three perpetrators killed in explosions; other suspects sought
Yemen	March 2016	2016 Aden car bombing	Three suicide car bombings targeting military checkpoints	27	Dozens	Perpetrators killed in explosions
Iraq	March 2016	2016 Iraqi soccer stadium bombings	Suicide bomber detonated suicide bomb in stadium	41	78	Perpetrator killed by explosion
Bangladesh	April 2016	Murder of Xulhaz Mannan	Xulhaz Mannan, a U.S. embassy employee and the editor of Bangladesh's first LGBT magazine, was hacked to death in his apartment along with his friend.	2	0	Perpetrators at large
Iraq	April 2016	April 2016 Baghdad bombing	At least 38 people were killed and 86 others wounded, as a result of two car bombings, in Iraq's capital of Baghdad.	38+	86+	
Iraq	May 2016	2016 Samawa bombing	On 1 May 2016, attacks targeted Iraq's deep Shiite south, with the explosion of twin suicide car bombs in the city of Samawa. At least 33 people were killed and 75 wounded.	33	75	Two perpetrators killed in explosions
Iraq	May 2016	11 May 2016 Baghdad bombing	Four separate car bombings in the Iraqi capital Baghdad claimed at least 110 lives.	110+	165+	Perpetrators killed in car explosions
Iraq	May 2016	Real Madrid Fan Club massacre	Two separate incidents in which three gunmen and suicide bombers attacked Real Madrid football fans at a supporters' café	28	45	Roughly six perpetrators killed
Iraq	May 2016	May 2016 Baghdad bombings	On 17 May 2016, a series of bombings by the terrorist group Islamic State of Iraq and the Levant hit the Iraqi capital city of Baghdad. At least 101 people were killed and 194 injured.	101	194	
Yemen	May 2016	23 May 2016 Yemen bombings	Two suicide bombings targeted army recruits.	45+	60+	Two perpetrators killed (maybe more)
Kazakhstan	June 2016	2016 Aktobe shootings	A group of several dozen militants attacked two gun shops and a military base in Aktobe, killing four civilians and three soldiers. Several attackers were killed during the attacks on the shops and base and more were killed during police raids that followed over the next few days.	7	40+	18 perpetrators killed, 9 arrested
Israel	June 2016	June 2016 Tel Aviv shooting	Two Palestinian men opened fire on patrons at the Max Brenner Café on Sarona Market, Tel Aviv. 21 were injured, including 14 shock victims.	4	21	Perpetrators sentenced to life in prison.
France	June 2016	2016 Magnanville stabbing	IS took responsibility for a stabbing that killed a French police officer and his companion.	2	0	Perpetrator killed by police
Malaysia	June 2016	2016 Movida Bar grenade attack	Two men approaching a bar and one of them throwing a grenade before escaping with their motorcycle while customer is watching the UEFA Euro 2016 between Italy and Spain. First ever IS attack in Malaysia.	0	8	Perpetrator arrested by police
Turkey	June 2016	2016 Atatürk Airport attack	Three men from former Soviet states opened fire on Atatürk Airport in Istanbul before blowing themselves up.	45	239	Perpetrators killed
United States	June 2016	Pulse nightclub shooting	29-year-old Omar Mateen killed 49 people and wounded 53 others in a mass shooting inside Pulse, a gay nightclub in Orlando, Florida.	49	53	Perpetrator killed, IS claimed responsibility for attack
Bangladesh	July 2016	2016 Dhaka attack	Five men attacked a café in the Gulshan Thana of Dhaka and took hostages.	24	50	Five perpetrators killed
Iraq	July 2016	July 2016 Baghdad bombings	Two bomb attacks in the district of Karrada and the suburb of Sha'ab in Baghdad.	347	225+	Members of a militant cell connected to the bombings arrested
Saudi Arabia	July 2016	2016 Medina suicide bombing	A suicide bomber targeted security forces outside the Prophet's Mosque in Medina, a man blew himself up after police tried to arrest him near the U.S. consulate in Jeddah, and two more bomb attacks occurred in Qatif.	7	7	Four perpetrators killed by explosions
France	July 2016	2016 Nice truck attack	On 14 July (Bastille Day), Mohamed Lahouaiej-Bouhlel, a 31 year old from Tunisia, deliberately drove a 19 tonne cargo truck into crowds celebrating Bastille Day on Promenade des Anglais in Nice, France. IS claimed responsibility.	86	434	Perpetrator killed by police at the scene.
Germany	July 2016	2016 Würzburg train attack	A 17-year-old Afghan refugee seriously injured four people with a knife and an axe on a train near Würzburg in Germany	0	5	Perpetrator killed by police
Afghanistan	July 2016	July 2016 Kabul bombing	Two suicide bombers detonated explosive belts on civilians.	80	231+	Both perpetrators killed in explosion
Germany	July 2016	2016 Ansbach bombing	A Syrian refugee detonates a suicide vest near a music festival in Ansbach, where there were about 2,500 people at that moment.	0	15	Perpetrator killed in explosion
France	July 2016	2016 Normandy church attack	Priest Jacques Hamel, two nuns, and two worshipers taken hostage by two men armed with knives in the church during mass. Hamel was killed.	1	3	Both perpetrators killed by police
Syria	July 2016	July 2016 Qamishli bombings	Two explosions in the predominantly Kurdish town Qamishli in Syria, killing at 57 including 8 Asayish people and wounding over 171 people.	57	171+	At least 1 perpetrator was killed by the explosion
Belgium	August 2016	2016 Charleroi attack	A man attacked two policewomen with a machete in Charleroi, Belgium, before being shot dead by another police officer. The attacker is reported to have said "Allahu Akbar" during the attack.	0	2	Perpetrator killed by police
Pakistan	August 2016	August 2016 Quetta attacks	A suicide bomber in Pakistan killed at least 90 people and wounded more than 100 in an attack on mourners gathered at a hospital in the southwestern city of Quetta, and Islamic State and a Taliban faction claimed responsibility.	93+	130+	Perpetrator killed in explosion
Turkey	August 2016	August 2016 Gaziantep bombing	A child suicide bomber kills over 50 at a wedding in Gaziantep province.	57	69	Perpetrator killed in explosion
Syria	September 2016		On 5 September, suicide bombers simultaneously attacked Tartus, Homs, Damascus, and Hasakah. A car bomb detonated on a coastal highway in Tartus (five dead); a car bomb hit a Syrian Army checkpoint in the Zahra district of Homs (two soldiers killed). A motorcycle bomb detonated near an Asayish checkpoint in Hasakah (five dead), with an explosion in Damascus following soon after.	48–53		Perpetrators killed
Iraq	September 2016	9 September 2016 Baghdad bombings	A suicide bomber in a car in Baghdad killed at least 40 people and wounded more than 60 Islamic State claimed.	40+	60+	Perpetrator killed in explosion
Belgium	October 2016	2016 stabbing of Brussels police officers	Three police officers were attacked by a man with a machete in the Schaerbeek municipality of Brussels.	0	4	
Pakistan	October 2016	October 2016 Quetta attacks	Three heavily armed terrorists carried out an attack on the Balochistan police training college.	62	160+	One killed during operation, two killed in explosion
United States	November 2016	Ohio State University attack	Abdul Razak Ali Artan stabbed people and ran others over with a car, injuring 11, before being shot and killed by a police officer. IS praised the attack and said Artan had responded to their call to attack civilians of coalition countries.	1	11	Suspect shot by OSU response team officer.
Jordan	December 2016	2016 Al-Karak attack	On 18 December, a series of shootings occurred in Al-Karak, Jordan.	15	37	Four perpetrators were killed by security forces. IS later claimed responsibility for the attack.
Germany	December 2016	2016 Berlin truck attack	On 19 December, Anis Amri, a 24 year old Tunisian asylum seeker, hijacked a Polish truck in Berlin and drove it into a Christmas market in Breitscheidplatz, Berlin. The attack claimed 13 lives, including the original driver of the truck. IS claimed responsibility and later released a video of Amri pledging allegiance to Abu Bakr al-Baghdadi.	13	56	Suspect killed in Sesto San Giovanni (MI) by Italian police.

== 2017 ==
Country	Date	Article	Description	Dead	Injured	Status
Turkey	January 2017	Istanbul nightclub shooting	At least 39 people are killed and nearly 70 wounded after a gunman opens fire in a nightclub in Istanbul, on the European coast of the Bosphorus.	39	69	Perpetrator arrested on 16 January. Islamic State of Iraq and the Levant claims responsibility.
Iraq	January 2017	January 2017 Sadr City bombings	At least 70 people dead in 3 separate suicide bomb attacks in Baghdad over the space of 2 days.	70+	100+	Perpetrators killed in explosions
Afghanistan	February 2017	2017 Kabul Supreme Court Bombing	Suicide bomber kills 22 at the Supreme Court of Afghanistan, Kabul. IS claims responsibility.	22+	35+	Perpetrator killed in explosion
Iraq	February 2017		Car bomb explodes in Baghdad's Baya neighborhood, a majority-Shiite community. IS claims responsibility.	54+	63+	
Pakistan	February 2017	Sehwan suicide bombing	Suicide bomber kills 100 at the Sufi Shrine. IS claims responsibility.	90	300+	Perpetrator killed in explosion
Syria	February 2017	Part of Battle of al-Bab	Car bomb kills 51 people in a small village outside of Al-Bab, Syria.	51	Unknown	IS claimed responsibility
Afghanistan	March 2017	2017 Kabul hospital attack	Shooting and bombing at military hospital in Kabul.	49	63+	Perpetrators killed
Bangladesh	March 2017	2017 Dhaka RAB camp suicide bombing	Suicide bomber enters under-construction Rapid Action Battalion headquarters and detonates suicide vest.	0	2	Perpetrator killed. IS claimed responsibility for the attack.
United Kingdom	March 2017	2017 Westminster attack	Car plows through crowd gathered outside of Westminster Palace before assailant stabbed police officer to death.	6	49	Perpetrator killed. IS claimed responsibility for the attack.
Bangladesh	March 2017	2017 South Surma Upazila bombings	Militants bombed a crowd of about 500–600 people gathered near the army and police perimeter, which was about 400 metres from the militant hideout.	7	40+	Four perpetrators killed. IS claimed responsibility for the attack.
Egypt	April 2017	Palm Sunday church bombings	Suicide bombings at two churches on Palm Sunday in the cities of Tanta and Alexandria.	43	136	Perpetrators killed. IS claims responsibility for the attacks.
Sweden	April 2017	2017 Stockholm truck attack	Truck drives into people on Drottninggatan pedestrian street before crashing into Åhléns department store, after which the perpetrator fails to ignite a homemade butane gas bomb.	5	15	Perpetrator arrested. IS does not claim responsibility for the attack but the perpetraitor claims to act on their behalf.
France	April 2017	April 2017 Champs-Élysées attack	Police officers shot in Champs-Élysées, Paris. The incident killed one police officer and injured two more before the perpetrator was killed.	2	2	Perpetrator killed. IS claimed responsibility.
Pakistan	May 2017	2017 Mastung suicide bombing	A bombing targeting Abdul Ghafoor Haideri in Mastung District.	25	37	IS claimed responsibility.
United Kingdom	May 2017	Manchester Arena bombing	Suicide bombing targeting concertgoers at the Manchester Arena at the end of an Ariana Grande concert.	22	59	Perpetrator killed. IS claimed responsibility.
Philippines	May 2017	Siege of Marawi	Philippine security forces launch an operation in Marawi upon receiving reports that Isnilon Hapilon is meeting with militants of the Maute group in the city. The militants in response took control of its medical center, burned schools and buildings and released prisoners.	1233	1400+	90% of Marawi recaptured by government forces. 12 militants detained.
Indonesia	May 2017	2017 Jakarta bombings	Islamic state claimed responsibility for Jakarta bus station attacks that left at least three policemen dead and 11 others wounded on Wednesday.	3	12	
Egypt	May 2017	2017 Minya bus attack	Masked gunmen opened fire on a convoy carrying Coptic Christians traveling from Maghagha in Egypt's Minya Governorate.	28	22	Perpetrators caught. IS claims responsibility.
United Kingdom	June 2017	2017 London Bridge attack	Van drives into pedestrians on London Bridge before three men emerge and stab people in nearby bars and restaurants.	8	48	Perpetrators killed. IS claims responsibility.
Australia	June 2017	2017 Brighton siege	Somali-born Yacqub Khayre orchestrates a siege taking a prostitute hostage in a serviced apartment complex in Brighton, Australia and kills the complex clerk before enticing police to the complex. He makes references to al-Qaeda and IS.	1	3	Perpetrator killed. IS claims responsibility and police declare it a terrorist incident.
Iran	June 2017	2017 Tehran attacks	On 7 June 2017, two attacks were simultaneously carried in the Iranian parliament and the Mausoleum of Ruhollah Khomeini, shrine of Iran's revolutionary founder, Ayatollah Ruhollah Khomeini.	17	42	4 of the perpetrators killed, 2 of them killed in explosions, IS claims responsibility.
Israel	June 2017	June 2017 Jerusalem attack	Two Palestinian men opened fire on Israeli police, injuring four officers. In addition, another attacker stabbed an Israeli soldier to death.	1	4	All three perpetrators were killed.
Belgium	June 2017	2017 Brussels-Central bombing	An attacker detonated a small bomb in Brussels-Central railway station, and was later shot dead by police.	1	0	
Afghanistan	August 2017		Suicide Blast kills 36 people in Afghanistan. IS claims responsibility of the attack.	36	Unknown	2 perpetrators dead in the suicide blast.
Pakistan	August 2017	August 2017 Quetta suicide bombing	Suicide blast kills 15 people including 8 Pakistani soldiers.	15	40	IS claimed responsibility.
Finland	August 2017	2017 Turku attack	Two women were killed in the attack. The perpetrator was identified as Abderrahman Bouanane, a Moroccan citizen and rejected asylum seeker, who reportedly identified himself as a "soldier of the Islamic State". Despite this there was no claim of responsibility from IS.	2	8	Life sentence for Turku stabber.
Spain	August 2017	2017 Barcelona attacks	Van hits several pedestrians after jumping sidewalk in La Rambla	16	152	Perpetrator killed.IS claimed responsibility.
Belgium	August 2017	2017 Brussels stabbing attack	Two soldiers were injured by an assailant wielding a knife, who was shot by authorities and later died in the hospital.	1	2	
United Kingdom	September 2017	Parsons Green train bombing	A bomb explodes at Parsons Green station in London	0	30	IS claimed responsibility.
Canada	September 2017	2017 Edmonton attack	Edmonton police constable Mike Chernyk was allegedly hit and stabbed by 30-year-old Abdulahi Sharif, who then hit 4 pedestrians with a rental truck in a police chase	0	5	IS flag found in rental truck.
France	October 2017	2017 Marseille stabbing	A man killed two women at the Saint-Charles Station in Marseille, France	2	0	IS claimed responsibility.
United States	October 2017	2017 New York City truck attack	A man drove a flatbed pickup truck into pedestrians on a bike path along West Street in Lower Manhattan, New York City.	8	12	Attacker taken into Police Custody. IS claimed responsibility.
Egypt	November 2017	2017 Sinai mosque attack	Attackers launched rocket propelled grenades and opened fire on the worshipers during the crowded Friday prayer at al-Rawda near Bir al-Abed.	311	128	Survivors noted that the attackers brandished the Islamic State flag.
United States	December 2017	2017 New York City Subway bombing	Akayed Ullah, 27, attempted a suicide bombing at the 42nd Street-Port Authority Bus Terminal. The crude pipe bomb injured 4 people including the bomber.	0	3 (+1)	The perpetrator was reported as declaring his allegiance to IS.
Afghanistan	December 2017	28 December 2017 Kabul suicide bombing	Suicide bombing at the Tabayan cultural centre in Kabul.	50	80	Perpetrators killed. IS claimed responsibility.

== 2018 ==
Country	Date	Article	Description	Dead	Injured	Status
Iraq	January 2018	2018 Baghdad bombings	On 15 January 2018, two suicide bombings took place at al-Tayaran Square of Baghdad, killing 38 people and injuring more than 105 others. IS claimed responsibility.	36	105	Perpetrators killed. IS claimed responsibility.
Afghanistan	January 2018	2018 Save the Children Jalalabad attack	On 24 January 2018, militants affiliated with Islamic State of Iraq and the Levant – Khorasan Province launched a bomb and gun attack on a Save the Children office in Jalalabad, a city in the eastern Afghan province of Nangarhar, killing six people and injuring 27.	6	27	Perpetrators killed. IS claimed responsibility.
Russia	February 2018	2018 Kizlyar church shooting	On 18 February 2018, a 22-year-old man local to the Russia's southern province of Dagestan carrying a knife and a hunting rifle opened fire on a crowd at an Orthodox church in Kizlyar, killing five women and injuring several other people.	6	5	Perpetrator Killed. IS claimed responsibility.
France	March 2018	Carcassonne and Trèbes attack	A hostage crisis unfolded in the southern French town of Trèbes on 23 March 2018, but began hours earlier in Carcassonne, when 26-year-old French-Moroccan Redouane Lakdim killed a motorist and injured his passenger, then stole the car and attacked four French police officers, wounding one. Lakdim drove to nearby Trèbes, where he stormed a Super U supermarket, ultimately killing two civilians and a gendarme and injuring several more.	5	15	Perpetrator killed. Gunman claimed allegiance with IS.
Iraq	April 2018	2018 Asdira funeral bombing	25 people were killed and 18 wounded when explosives exploded at a funeral for Sunni Muslim tribal fighters in the village of Asdira near the northern Iraqi town of Al-Shirqat.	25	18	IS claimed responsibility.
Afghanistan	April 2018	April 2018 Kabul suicide bombing	On 22 April 2018, a suicide blast killed 69 people and wounded dozens more Sunday at a voter registration center in Koche Mahtab Qala, in the Dashte Barchi area of western Kabul, Afghanistan.	69	120	Perpetrator killed. IS claimed responsibility.
Mali	April 2018	Aklaz and Awkassa massacres	Islamic State fighters attacked refugee camps, in an act of ethnic violence against the Idaksahak and Tuareg peoples.	47	2	IS claimed responsibility.
Afghanistan	April 2018	30 April 2018 Kabul suicide bombings	At least 29 people were killed and 50 others injured in two suicide bombings in the Afghan capital Kabul, including several journalists documenting the scene.	29	50	IS claimed responsibility.
Libya	May 2018	2018 attack on the High National Elections Commission in Tripoli, Libya	Suicide bombers attacked the head offices of Libya's electoral commission in Tripoli, killing at least 16 people, injuring 20 and setting fire to the building.	16	20	IS claimed responsibility for the attack.
France	May 2018	2018 Paris knife attack	On 12 May 2018, a man was fatally shot by police after killing one pedestrian and injuring several more in Paris, France.	2	8	Perpetrator killed. IS claims responsibility.
Indonesia	May 2018	2018 Surabaya churches bombings	The 2018 Surabaya churches bombings were a series of terrorist attacks that occurred on 13 May 2018 in three churches in Surabaya, the second largest city in Indonesia. The explosions took place at Innocent Saint Mary Catholic Church (Gereja Katolik Santa Maria Tak Bercela, SMTB) on Ngagel Madya Street, Surabaya Central Pentecost Church (Gereja Pantekosta Pusat Surabaya, GPPS) on Arjuno Street, and Indonesia Christian Church (Gereja Kristen Indonesia, GKI) on Diponegoro Street. The first explosion took place at the SMTB Church. The second and third explosions followed 30 minutes apart.	28	57	28 dead including all of the perpetrators. IS claims responsibility.
Belgium	May 2018	2018 Liege shooting	On 29 May 2018, Benjamin Herman, a prisoner on temporary leave from prison, stabbed two female police officers, took their guns and shot and killed them and a civilian in Liège, Belgium.	4	4	Perpetrator killed. IS claims responsibility.
Afghanistan	June 2018		A suicide bomber killed at least 36 people and injured 65 others at a gathering of Taliban and Afghan armed forces in the Rodat district of the eastern Afghan province of Nangarhar	36	65	Perpetrator killed. IS claimed responsibility.
Afghanistan	July 2018	July 2018 Jalalabad suicide bombing	On 1 July 2018, a suicide bomber detonated in the center of the eastern Afghan city of Jalalabad, killing 20 people, mainly Sikhs and Hindus, and injuring 20 others. IS said that 60 Afghan soldiers and "polytheists" were killed and wounded.	20	20	IS claimed responsibility, saying it targeted Afghan Special Forces.
Pakistan	July 2018	13 July 2018 Pakistan bombings	Siraj Raisani was about to address an election rally when a suicide bomber, carrying around 16–20 kg of explosive material in his vest, blew himself up among a crowd of more than 1000 people. Along with Raisani, the explosion killed 128 people. Two days after the attack, on 15 July 2018, the number of dead increased to 149, while 186 other people were injured, making it the deadliest terrorist attack in Pakistan since the APS massacre in Peshawar in 2014.	149	186	IS claimed responsibility.
Afghanistan	July 2018		At least 23 people, including an AFP driver, were killed and 107 others injured in a suicide bombing near Kabul International Airport as scores of people were leaving the airport after welcoming home Afghan Vice President Abdul Rashid Dostum from exile.	23	107	IS claimed responsibility.
Pakistan	July 2018	2018 Quetta suicide bombing	On 25 July 2018, during polling for the 2018 Pakistani general election, a bomb blast outside a polling station in Quetta's Eastern Bypass area resulted in 31 people being killed and over 35 injured. Islamic State of Iraq and the Levant claimed responsibility for the attack, according to the group's Amaq News Agency.	31	40	IS claimed responsibility for the attack.
Syria	July 2018	2018 As-Suwayda attacks	The 2018 As-Suwayda attacks were a string of suicide bombings and gun attacks that took place in and around As-Suwayda, Syria on 25 July, killing at least 246 people and injuring more than 200. The attacks were committed by the Islamic State.	246	200+	IS claimed responsibility for the attack.
Tajikistan	July 2018	Terrorist attack against cyclists in Tajikistan	Four cyclists, including two Americans, are killed after a car plowed through tourists traveling through Tajikistan.	4	3	IS claimed responsibility for the attack.
Afghanistan	August 2018	2018 Gardez Shiite Mosque Afghanistan Attack	Two militants dressed in burqa entered a Shiite mosque in the town of Gardez in the province of Paktia and opened fire. One of the attackers blew himself up and the other was gunned down by security guards. 39 people were killed and at least 80 others injured in the attack.	48	70	IS claimed responsibility.
Afghanistan	August 2018	August 2018 Kabul suicide bombing	A suicide bombing occurred on Wednesday 15 August 2018 in the Shia region of Kabul took place. Afghanistan's Ministry of Public Health reported that 48 people including 34 students were killed and 67 were injured. IS claimed responsibility.	48	67	IS claimed responsibility for the attack.
Iran	September 2018	Ahvaz military parade attack	On 22 September 2018, a military parade was attacked in the southwestern Iranian city of Ahvaz. The attackers killed 25 people, including soldiers of the Islamic Revolutionary Guard Corps and civilian bystanders.	30	70	Perpetrators killed. IS claimed responsibility and provided a video containing the alleged attackers discussing the attack.
Egypt	November 2018	2018 Minya bus attack	On 2 November 2018, multiple gunmen opened fire on a bus in Minya carrying Christian Copts, the attack killed 7 and injured 14, IS also claimed responsibility for the attack.	7	14	IS claimed responsibility and all of the 19 perpetrators were killed by Egyptian soldiers 2 days later.
Australia	November 2018	2018 Melbourne stabbing attack	On 9 November 2018, a Somali man set his car on fire and started stabbing people, killing one and injuring two. The attacker died in hospital after being shot by police. IS claimed responsibility for the attack.	1	2	The attacker, an IS sympathizer, was shot dead. IS claimed responsibility for the attack.
France	December 2018	2018 Strasbourg attack	On the evening of 11 December 2018, a mass shooting occurred in Strasbourg, France, when a man with a revolver opened fire on civilians in the city's busy Christkindelsmärik (Christmas market) killing five and wounding 11, before fleeing in a taxi.	5	11	Perpetrator killed by police 2 days later. IS claimed responsibility, but French interior minister Christophe Castaner described its claim as "totally opportunistic".
Russia	December 2018	2018 Magnitogorsk building collapse	On 31 December 2018, an apartment building in Magnitogorsk, Russia, was rocked by an explosion that leveled several floors, killing and wounding dozens of people. The following day a bus burst into flames and killed three people. However, the Russian Government has stated that the explosion was likely caused by a gas leak, not IS.	42	12+	The 165th issue of the Islamic State's An-Naba newspaper contained the claim of responsibility.

== 2019 ==
Country	Date	Article	Description	Dead	Injured	Status
Syria	January 2019	2019 Manbij bombing	A suicide bomber attacked a market, killing 19 people including 4 U.S. troops	19	3+	Perpetrator killed in blast.
Philippines	January 2019	2019 Jolo Cathedral bombings	2019 Jolo Cathedral bombings: 22 people, were killed and 102 others were injured when two bombs exploded in a cathedral during Sunday mass in Jolo, Philippines. The Islamic State-related branch of Abu Sayyaf terror group Ajang Ajang faction was behind the attack.	20	102	Abu Sayyaf (which is a part of IS) is believed to have carried out the attacks however IS has also claimed responsibility.
Pakistan	April 2019	2019 Quetta bombing	A suicide blast took place in a potato stall in Shia dominated Hazarganji vegetable market.	22	48+	Lashkar-e-Jhangvi and IS claimed responsibility
Sri Lanka	April 2019	2019 Sri Lanka Easter bombings	On 21 April 2019, 6 suicide bomb attacks killing 253, including 45 children and 38 foreign nationals. Targets were 3 churches, namely St Anthony's church – Kotahena, St. Sebestian church – Negombo, Zion Church – Batticaloa and 3 leading hotels in Colombo namely Kingsbury Hotel, Shangri-La Hotel and Cinnamon Grand Hotel. There were 2 other suicide explosion in the afternoon in a small lodge in Dehiwala killing 2 and in the house of a main attacker in Colombo, killing 7 individuals including 3 police officers.	261	500+	IS claimed responsibility for the attack through AMAQ News Agency. Local Islamic extremist group, National Thawheeth Jama'ath is also directly involved in the attack.
Sri Lanka	April 2019	Sainthamaruthu shootout	On 27 April 2019, Sri Lankan security forces and militants from National Thowheeth Jama'ath allegedly linked to IS clashed after the security forces raided a safe house of the militants. Sixteen people, including six children, died during the raid as three cornered suicide bombers blew themselves up.	16	2	Groups involved in the attack swore allegiance to IS and Abu Bakr al-Baghdadi.
Afghanistan	August 2019	17 August 2019 Kabul bombing	On 17 August 2019, a suicide bomber detonated a bomb in a wedding hall, killing at least 92 people and injuring more than 140.	92	142	IS claimed responsibility.
Iraq	August 2019		In the night of 24 August 2019 six Iraqi people (five youths and one policeman) were killed and ten others were wounded when Islamic State militants launched a mortar attack on a football pitch in the village of Daquq at the north of Kirkuk	6	10	IS claimed responsibility.
Tajikistan	November 2019		On 6 November 2019, around 20 ISIS militants from Afghanistan conducted an attack on a border post in Rudaki, Tajikistan after crossing into Tajikistan from Afghanistan. The attack resulted in death of a Tajik border guard and a police officer. In the ensuing firefight 15 ISIS militants were killed and five were arrested.	2	0	15 IS militants shot dead. An additional 5 militants were arrested.
Nigeria	December 2019		On 27 December 2019 it was released a video by Amaq News Agency showing the killing of eleven Christians in Nigeria. ISWAP said it was part of its campaign to avenge the killing of IS leader Abu Bakr al-Baghdadi in a US military raid in Syria last October.	11	0	IS

== 2020 ==
Country	Date	Article	Description	Dead	Injured	Status
Niger	January 2020	Battle of Chinagodrar	On 9 January 2020 in a gunfight at a Niger military base, 89 Niger Armed Forces soldiers and 77 IS militants killed during the battle.	89 (+77)	6	IS claimed responsibility.
United Kingdom	February 2020	2020 Streatham stabbing	On 2 February 2020 two people were stabbed in Streatham, London, and one more had minor injuries. The perpetrator, Sudesh Amman, who was a fighter of Islamic State and had previously praised it, was shot dead by police.	1	3	IS claimed responsibility.
Afghanistan	March 2020	6 March 2020 Kabul shooting	On 6 March 2020, ISIL gunmen killed 32 people and injured over 80 people at a ceremony in Kabul.	32	80+	IS claimed responsibility.
Afghanistan	March 2020	Kabul gurdwara attack	On 25 March 2020, IS killed 25 people in a gurdwara in Kabul.	25	8	IS claimed responsibility.
Maldives	April 2020	None	On 16 April 2020, IS burned five boats in Alif Dhaalu Atoll.	0	0	IS claimed responsibility.
	May 2020	Kabul hospital shooting & Kuz Kunar funeral bombing	On 12 May 2020, gunmen executed a mass shooting at a hospital's maternity ward. 80 patients were evacuated, 24 victims, including newborn babies, mothers, and nurses, killed by the gunmen and all three attackers killed by the army; An hour after the Kabul attack, a suicide bombing took place in Kuz Kunar, Nangarhar Province at the funeral of a police commander, killing 32 mourners and injuring 133 others.	218	133	IS thought to be responsible for the Kabul shooting although the Afghan government blamed the Taliban for it; IS claimed responsibility for the Kuz Kunar bombing.
	August 2020	Jalalabad prison attack	On August 3, 2020, IS launched an attack on an Afghan prison that left at least 29 dead.	29	Unknown	IS claimed responsibility.
Philippines	August 2020	2020 Jolo bombings	The bombings occurred on August 24, 2020, when insurgents alleged to be jihadists from the Abu Sayyaf group detonated two bombs in Jolo, Sulu, Philippines, killing 14 people and wounding 75 others. The first occurred as Philippine Army personnel were assisting in carrying out COVID-19 humanitarian efforts. The second, a suicide bombing, was carried out near the Our Lady of Mount Carmel Cathedral.	14	80	Perpetrator killed in the bombing.
Tanzania	October 2020	Kitaya massacre	On October 15, 2020, militants from the Islamic State – Mozambique Province, launched an incursion into the village of Kitaya in Mtwara Region, Tanzania, the group's first claimed attack in Tanzania. At least twenty civilians were killed in the massacre. Tanzanian police estimated that around 300 jihadists took part in the massacre. In videos released by the Islamic State, the attackers were speaking Swahili, Makua, and Mwani, the two latter languages being spoken in northern Mozambique. Villagers in the town helped ISCAP identify which houses to set ablaze, and videos showed the attackers decapitating a man and looting weapons. In the videos, the jihadists' goal was "to kill the infidels", and was unrelated to the election that occurred the next day.	20	?	ISCAP claimed responsibility.
Austria	November 2020	2020 Vienna attack	Between November 2–3, five were killed in Stadttempel, Vienna, including the perpetrator. The Vienna Police Department confirmed that the attacker was an Islamic State sympathizer, and that the attack was motivated by Islamic extremism.	4 (+1)	23	Perpetrator pledged allegiance to IS.
Syria	December 2020		On 30 December 2020, an assault targeted a convoy of Syrian regime soldiers and militiamen of Bashar al-Assad's elite Fourth Brigade returning from their posts in Deir Ez-Zor. The bus was ambushed in a well-planned operation near the village of Shula by jihadists who set up a false checkpoint to stop the convoy and detonated bombs before opening fire.	40	-	IS claimed responsibility.

== 2021 ==
Country	Date	Article	Description	Dead	Injured	Status
Pakistan	January 2021	Machh attack	IS claims responsibility for killing 11 miners in Balochistan, Pakistan. They kidnapped the workers on 2 or 3 January and took them to the mountains. The victims' hands were tied and their dismembered bodies were on the floor of a cottage. Pakistani Prime Minister Imran Khan condemned the attacks, calling them "terrorist".	11	-	IS claimed responsibility.
Iraq	January 2021	Baghdad bombings	Islamic State of Iraq and the Levant targeted Shia Muslims on 21 January 2021 in a clothing market in Tayaran Square, Baghdad. US, UN, EU and the Pope condemn the attack calling it a senseless act of violence.	32	110	IS claimed responsibility.
Afghanistan	March 2021	2021 Afghanistan attacks	Three female media workers are shot dead in Jalalabad, Nangarhar. A fourth woman is wounded. The Islamic State claims responsibility for the attack.	3	1	IS claimed responsibility.
Afghanistan	March 2021	2021 Afghanistan attacks	A female doctor is killed and a child is wounded in Jalalabad, Nangarhar, after a bomb attached to her rickshaw explodes. Seven workers at a Hazara plaster factory are shot dead in Surkh-Rōd District, Nangarhar. ISIL is suspected to be behind the attacks.	8	1	IS believed to be perpetrators.
Afghanistan	May 2021	2021 Kabul school bombing	A car bombing, followed by two more improvised explosive device (IED) blasts, occurred in front of Sayed al-Shuhada school in Dashte Barchi, a predominantly Shia Hazara area in western Kabul, Afghanistan, leaving at least 85 people dead and 147 injured. The majority of the casualties were girls between 11 and 15 years old. The attack took place in a neighborhood that has frequently been attacked by militants belonging to Islamic State of Iraq and the Levant over the years.	85	147	Afghan Government blame the Taliban. However the Taliban deny they carried out the attack. IS-K is blamed for the attack.
Iraq	July 2021		In the evening of Monday, 19 July 2021, an IS suicide bomber detonated his vest in a crowded market in the densely populated neighbourhood of Baghdad's Sadr City killing at least 30 people, the event happened near the eve of Eid al-Adha Islamic festival. Women and children were among the dead and wounded and some shops burned down as a result of the explosion.	30	50	IS claims responsibility for the attack.
Afghanistan	August 2021	2021 Kabul airport attack	On 26 August 2021, at 17:50 local time (13:20 UTC), a suicide bombing occurred near Abbey Gate at Hamid Karzai International Airport in Kabul, Afghanistan. Another blast occurred after the bombing. These attacks came hours after the United States State Department told Americans outside the airport to leave due to a terrorist threat. At least 183 people were killed in the attacks, including 13 US service members.	182	200	IS claims responsibility for the attack.
New Zealand	September 2021	2021 Auckland Countdown stabbing	An IS supporter stabbed six people before being shot by police on 3 September in Auckland, New Zealand. The attacker came to New Zealand in 2011 and became a person of interest in October 2016, authorities said.	1	6	IS claims responsibility for the attack.
Afghanistan	September 2021		At least 7 people were killed and at least 30 were wounded during four explosions which occurred in Nangarhar's capital Jalalabad which targeted a Taliban patrol vehicle and another explosion which occurred in Kabul's Dasht-e-Barchi neighbourhood.	7	30	IS claimed responsibility for the attack.
Afghanistan	October 2021	2021 Kunduz mosque bombing	IS militants attacked, and killed many Shia Muslim worshipers in the mosque during their Friday prayer time.	50+	100+	IS claimed responsibility for the attack.
United Kingdom	October 2021	Murder of David Amess	An Islamic State sympathizer stabbed Conservative MP David Amess to death.	1	0	Perpetrator sentenced to life in prison.
Afghanistan	October 2021	2021 Kandahar bombing	IS militants attacked, and killed many Shia Muslim worshipers in the mosque during their Friday prayer time.	65	70+	IS claimed responsibility for the attack.
Uganda	October 2021—November 2021	2021 Uganda bombings	Between October 2021—November 2021, IS conducted several attacks throughout Uganda	7 (+4)	39	IS claimed responsibility.
Niger	November 2021	2021 Adab-Dab attack	Gunmen ambushed a delegation held by the mayor of Bani-Bangou.	69		ISGS accused.

== 2022 ==
Country	Date	Article	Description	Dead	Injured	Status
Iraq	January 2022	2022 Diyala massacre	11 Iraqi soldiers were murdered in their sleep by Islamic State fighters.	11	0	Islamic State claimed responsibility
Pakistan	March 2022	2022 Peshawar mosque bombing	The Islamic State attacked a Shiite mosque in Peshawar, the capital of the Khyber Pakhtunkhwa province in Pakistan.	62 (+1)	196	IS-KP claimed responsibility
Israel	March 2022	2022 Beersheba attack	An Arab-Israeli Bedouin man affiliated with IS was responsible for a stabbing in Beersheba.	4	2	IS claimed responsibility
Israel	March 2022	2022 Hadera shooting	2 Arab-Israeli men affiliated with IS were responsible for a shooting in Hadera.	2	12	IS claimed responsibility
Afghanistan	April 2022	2022 Mazar-i-Sharif mosque bombing	A bomb exploded at a Shiite mosque in Mazar-i-Sharif during Friday prayers, killing 31 people and wounding 87.	31	87	
Afghanistan	April 2022	April 2022 Kabul mosque bombing	The bombing occurred around 2:00 pm at the Khalifa Aga Gul Jan Mosque in Kabul, where hundreds of congregants were gathered for prayers. Interior ministry spokesman Mohammad Nafi Takor confirmed ten fatalities. Sayed Fazil Agha, the mosque's leader, said more than 50 died. Police chief spokesman Khalid Zadran said as many as 30 people were wounded.	50	30	IS claimed responsibility for the attack.
Norway	June 2022	2022 Oslo shooting	An Iranian-Norwegian man swore allegiance to the Islamic State before carrying out a mass shooting targeting a gay pride event.	2	21	Perpetrator was sentenced to 30 years in prison
Benin	July 2022		Multiple IS militants ambushed and killed 4 Beninese soldiers near the town of Alfa Kawoura	4	0	IS claimed responsibility
Uzbekistan	July 2022	2022 Termez rocket attacks	On July 5, 2022, five shells were fired from Afghan territory into the city of Termez. The rockets were launched by the Islamic State	0	0	Commanded by Islamic State commanders.
Afghanistan	August 2022		Two Taliban police officers were killed and four were wounded during a gunbattle with Islamic State gunmen at a hideout in Kabul. Three Islamic State militants were also killed.	5	4	
Afghanistan	August 2022		On 5 August 2022, eight people were killed and 18 others were injured when a bomb hidden in a cart exploded near a Shiite mosque in Kabul.	8	18	Islamic State claimed responsibility for the attack.
Afghanistan	September 2022	September 2022 Kabul school bombing	A suicide bomber blew himself up at the Kaaj education center in Dashte Barchi, a Hazara neighborhood in Kabul, Afghanistan, killing at least 52 people.	52+	110	
Mozambique	October 2022		Many IS militants attacked an Indian-owned Ruby Mine in Montepuez, which is considered the world's largest ruby mine.			IS claimed responsibility
Iran	October 2022	2022 Shiraz massacre	An IS terrorist led a massacre at the Shah Cheragh Shia mosque in Shiraz, Fars province, Iran. At least 15 people have been killed due to this event, 2 have been arrested while 1 was killed. IS has claimed responsibility for the attack on its telegram channel.	15	40	IS claimed responsibility for the massacre.
Afghanistan	December 2022	2022 Kabul hotel attack	2 IS militants set off explosives and set fire to the Longan Hotel in Kabul due to its ties to the Chinese government. 6 people were killed, including one of the attackers, and another 18 were injured, including foreign and Afghan civilians and Taliban soldiers.	5	18	One IS perpetrator killed in the bombing.
Syria	December 2022		A lone IS suicide bomber detonated a suicide vest in an attack on an SDF security centre in the former ISIS capital, Raqqa. The bomber and at least 6 SDF were killed in the attack.	7	-	IS claimed responsibility.

== 2023 ==
Country	Date	Article	Description	Dead	Injured	Status
Afghanistan	January 2023	2023 Kabul airport bombing	An attacker detonated a bomb outside the entrance to the military portion of Kabul International Airport.	20 (claimed)	30 (claimed)	Islamic State claimed responsibility
Afghanistan	January 2023	Ministry of Foreign Affairs of Afghanistan bombing	A suicide bomber detonated outside the Taliban foreign ministry office in Kabul, reportedly during the visit of a Chinese delegation.	20+		Perpetrator killed in the bombing. Islamic State claimed responsibility.
DRC	January 2023	Kasindi church bombing	An Islamic State affiliated group planted a bomb in a Pentecostal Church, and blew it up	17	39	Islamic State claimed responsibility
Burkina Faso	March 2023		Islamic State militants attacked a unit of Burkina Faso soldiers that was patrolling the area	15	0	Islamic State claimed responsibility
DRC	April 2023		The Islamic State - Central Africa Province cell claimed responsibility for the attack after raiding a farm in the village of Enebula in North Kivu province	21	~30	Islamic State claimed responsibility
Syria	April 2023		The Islamic State claimed responsibility for attacking and killing a group of around 10 militants and 16 civilians near the capital of Damascus	26	Unknown	Islamic State claimed responsibility
Pakistan	July 2023	2023 Khar bombing	A suicide bomb at a Jamiat Ulema-e-Islam (F) rally in Khar, Bajaur District, Khyber Pakhtunkhwa, Pakistan, killed at least 63 people and injured nearly 200 others.	63 (+1)	200+	Islamic State claimed responsibility
Afghanistan	October 2023	2023 Pul-i-Khumri bombing	The Islamic State claimed responsibility for attack on Shia Mosque in Baghlan	7 (+1)	17	Islamic State claimed responsibility
France	October 2023	Arras school stabbing	An IS-pledged lone wolf murdered a teacher and wounded 3 others at his former school in Arras	1	3	The perpetrator pledged allegiance to the Islamic State
Belgium	October 2023	2023 Brussels terrorist attack	An IS-pledged lone wolf shot dead 2 Swedish nationals and wounded a third person in Brussels	3 (1)	1	The perpetrator pledged allegiance to the Islamic State Islamic State claimed responsibility
Philippines	December 2023	Mindanao State University bombing	A bombing occurred at a Roman Catholic Mass in Mindanao State University, Marawi	4	72	Islamic State claimed responsibility Involvement of local IS affiliate, Maute group, being considered.
Uganda	December 2023	Kyabandara parish attack	ADF rebels attacked a Kyabandara parish in Kamwenge district in Western Uganda and killed at least 5 people.	5	0	Allied Democratic forces (ADF) who pledged allegiance to ISIS

== 2024 ==
Country	Date	Article	Description	Dead	Injured	Status
Iran	January 2024	2024 Kerman bombings	Two bombings occurred during a ceremony commemorating the assassination of Qasem Soleimani in Kerman.	103 (+2)	284	Islamic State claimed responsibility
Afghanistan	January 2024		Explosives planted in a bus in the Dasht-e-Barchi neighborhood of Kabul detonated, killing five people.	5	15	Islamic State claimed responsibility
Afghanistan	January 2024		An explosive was detonated in a minivan in Kabul, killing three people.	3	4	Islamic State claimed responsibility
Iraq	January 2024		Militants in two vehicles opened fire on Iraqi soldiers stationed near Haditha with snipers and semi-automatic weapons, killing three.	3	1	Islamic State suspected
Turkey	January 2024	2024 Istanbul church shooting	Two gunmen entered the Church of Santa Maria in Istanbul during Sunday mass and shot and killed a man before leaving.	1	1	Islamic State claimed responsibility
Pakistan	January 2024	2024 Sibi bombing	A bombing targeting an election rally for the Tehreek-e-Insaf party in the Sibi region killed at least four people. ISIS claimed ten people were killed or injured.	4	5	Islamic State claimed responsibility
Pakistan	February 2024	2024 Balochistan bombings	Twin bombings occurred at two political offices in Balochistan province a day before the Pakistani general election	28-30+	40+	Islamic State claimed responsibility
Mozambique	February 2024	Mucojo attack	In Mucojo, ISIS militants attacked Mozambician soldiers, killing 25. Militants also shot at a passenger bus in Meluco, killing the driver. The attackers left notes for the passengers, which announced a declaration of war on Christians and said that non-Muslims would have to pay a jizyah if they did not convert to Islam, and would be killed if they refused.	26+	0	Islamic State claimed responsibility
Democratic Republic of the Congo	February 2024		Rebels killed two dozen people with machetes and guns in Ituri and North Kivu Provinces in separate attacks.	24+		ADF accused
Syria	February 2024		13 people were killed by a landmine left by ISIS while they were hunting for truffles in Raqqa Governorate.	13		Islamic State accused
Switzerland	March 2024		A 50-year-old Jewish man was stabbed by a 15-year-old boy in the city of Zürich. The boy had pledged allegiance to the leader of the Islamic State in a video before the attack.		1	Perpetrator pledged allegiance to the Islamic State
Niger	March 2024	2024 Tillabéri attack	A Nigerien Army unit was ambushed near Teguey, Tillabéri Region. The Islamic State said that 30 soldiers were killed, while the Nigerien Defense Ministry said there were 23 deaths. Around 30 attackers were allegedly killed during the ambush.	23 (+30)	17+	Islamic State claimed responsibility
Afghanistan	March 2024	2024 Kandahar New Kabul Bank bombing	A suicide bombing at a branch of the New Kabul Bank in Kandahar occurred people as they were attempting to collect their monthly salaries. ISIS said it was targeting the Taliban, but the Taliban said the attack targeted civilians. The Taliban said that three people were killed and 12 were injured, while the Mirwais Hospital said 21 were killed and over 50 were injured.	21 (+1)	50	Islamic State claimed responsibility
Russia	March 2024	Crocus City Hall attack	Four gunmen carried out a mass shooting, stabbing, and arson attack at the Crocus City Hall in Krasnogorsk, Moscow Oblast. Gunmen used incendiary devices to ignite a fire, which caused extensive damage, including the collapse of the concert hall's roof.	151	609	Islamic State claimed responsibility
Afghanistan	April 2024	2024 Guzara Attack	A gunman attacked a Shiite mosque in Guzara, Herat Province with machine-gun fire, killing six people before fleeing the scene.	6	1	Islamic State claimed responsibility
Afghanistan	May 2024	2024 Bamyan shooting	Gunman attacked a group of Western tourists (Spaniards, Lithuanians, Norwegians, and Australians), alongside their Afghan guides, in the city of Bamyan, Bamyan Province with machine-gun fire, killing seven people (including four tourists), and wounding seven others (including three tourists) before fleeing the scene.	7	7	Islamic State claimed responsibility
Lebanon	June 2024	2024 Beirut US embassy shooting	A Syrian national opened fire at the U.S. embassy in Beirut, wounding a security guard. The Lebanese Armed Forces responded to the attack, shooting the gunman twice and capturing him.	0	1 (+1)	Local media reported that the perpetrator wore a vest with the words "Islamic State" in Arabic and the initials IS in English, suggesting that he may have been involved with the group.
Syria	June 2024		Sixteen Syrian soldiers were killed by a minefield laid by ISIS.	16	0	Islamic State claimed responsibility
Russia	June 2024	Rostov-on-Don pre-trial detention center hostage crisis	6 ISIS detainees, armed with knives, escaped their cells and took two Russian detention center employees/police officers hostage at a detention center in the city of Rostov-on-Don in Russia, and demanded a vehicle, weapons, and free passage. Russian security forces raided the center, killing 5 of them and capturing and wounding the sixth, and freeing the hostages.	0 (+5)	1-2 (+1)	All 6 of the detainees had previously been arrested for being Islamic State members and plotting attacks for the group. Videos recorded by the attackers during the incident also showed at least 2 of them wearing Islamic State-style headbands, one of them holding an Islamic State flag, and they proclaimed their allegiance to the group.
Russia	June 2024	2024 Dagestan attacks	Militants opened fire at a church and a synagogue in Derbent and another synagogue and a police station in Makhachkala. Six police officers and two militants were killed, while a priest in Derbent was also killed when his throat was slit.	22 (+5)	45	Islamic State claimed responsibility via Al Naba, an ISIL-affiliated newspaper.
Serbia	June 2024	2024 attack on the Israeli embassy in Belgrade	A Serbia Muslim convert opened fire with a crossbow at the Israeli embassy in Belgrade, wounding a security guard. The guard responded to the attack, shooting the gunman and killing him.	0 (+1)	1	The perpetrator pledged allegiance to the Islamic State and its leader Abu Hafs. Police also found IS-linked items at the attacker's home, including an IS flag.
Oman	July 2024	2024 Muscat mosque shooting	9 people (including the 3 attackers) were killed in a mass shooting at Imam Ali Mosque in Wadi Kabir, Muscat.	6 (+3)	28	Islamic State claimed responsibility.
Afghanistan	August 2024	2024 Kabul bus bombing	An explosive was detonated on a bus carrying Hazaras in the commune of Dashte Barchi, Kabul, killing 1 civilian and injuring 11-13 others.	1	11-13	Islamic State – Khorasan Province claims responsibility
Russia	August 2024	Surovikino penal colony hostage crisis	Four ISIS prisoners armed with knives took prison employees and inmates hostage at the IK-19 maximum security prison in Surovikino. They fatally stabbed nine people, including five employees and injured two other employees. The militants were later killed by snipers, ending the hostage crisis.	9 (+4)	2	Perpetrators claimed that they were ISIS militants and waved flags of the organization. The attackers also claimed they were acting in revenge for the detention of the Crocus City Hall attack perpetrators.
Germany	August 2024	Solingen stabbing	A Syrian ISIS member armed with a knife stabbed several people at a festival in the city of Solingen. The attack left 3 people dead and 8 others injured. The perp was later arrested by German authorities.	3	8	IS claimed responsibility for the attack, and later released videos of the attacker, where he cited the wars in Bosnia, Iraq, Syria, Afghanistan, and Palestine as a reason for the attack. German Authorities also confirmed that the attacker shared the ideology of the Islamic state
Afghanistan	September 2024	2024 Qala Bakhtiar bombing	A suicide bomber detonated his explosive vest outside a government building in the Qala Bakhtiar neighbourhood in the Afghanistan capital Kabul, killing six people and injuring thirteen others.	6 (+1)	13	Islamic State claimed responsibility.
Nigeria	September 2024	Tarmuwa massacre	50 armed jihadists carried out attacks in the district of Tarmuwa in Yobe State.	130	30+	IS claimed responsibility for the massacre in their Al-Naba newsletter.
Afghanistan	September 2024	2024 Afghanistan bus shooting	Gunmen opened fire at a group of Shiite civilians welcoming pilgrims from Karbala, Iraq, in Daykundi Province, killing 15.	15	6	Islamic State claimed responsibility

== 2025 ==
Country	Date	Article	Description	Dead	Injured	Status
United States	January 2025	2025 New Orleans truck attack	A man drove a pickup truck into a crowd on Bourbon Street in New Orleans, Louisiana, United States, then exited the truck and engaged in a shootout with police before being fatally shot.	14 (+1)	57	The Attacker pledged allegiance to the Islamic State, and IS praised the attack claiming its propaganda radicalized the attacker.
Niger and Mali	January 2025	Abductions of Eva Gretzmacher and Claudia Abbt	On 11 January 2025, Eva Gretzmacher, an Austrian development worker for the AMANAY Association, was abducted by armed men. On 13 April, Swiss community worker Claudia Abbt was also abducted by armed men. Both women were abducted at their homes in the city of Agadez by the Islamic State – Sahel Province.	0	0	On 29 April the Islamic State – Sahel Province claimed responsibility for the abductions by publishing a photo of Gretzmacher. At the time she was reportedly in good health.
Mali	January 2025		On 14 January, a Spanish tourist Navarro Giane Gilbert was abducted at the Assekrem plateau in the Ahaggar National Park by up to five Algerian and Malian rebels who hoped to sell Gilbert to ISSP. Gilbert was freed by the Azawad Liberation Front days later on 21 January in the Ménaka Region.			The men wanted to sell the man to ISSP a faction of ISIS
Nigeria	January 2025		A suicide bomber drove a vehicle with explosives into a convoy of Nigerian troops that were targeting ISWAP militants in Malam-Fatori, Borno State, Nigeria, killing himself and 27 soldiers. Several other troops were critically injured.	27 (+1 suicide bomber)	Several	The attacker was an Islamic State fighter.
Afghanistan	January 2025		A Chinese national was killed in a shooting.	1	0	Islamic State claimed responsibility.
Mali	February 2025	Kobé attack	On February 7, a convoy left the city of Gao and set off for Ansongo. According to Human Rights Watch, the convoy contained 19 civilian vehicles carrying more than a hundred civilians, escorted by five military vans and several motorcycles carrying Malian troops and allied Wagner Group forces. Both AFP and RFI reported that the convoy contained 22 minibuses, six large buses, and eight trucks escorted by ten military vehicles. The civilians were mostly gold miners of foreign nationalities, who were trying to reach a site near the Intahaka gold mine along the border with Niger.	20	34	No group claimed responsibility for the attack, but ISGS is active in the area.
Austria	February 2025	2025 Villach stabbing attack	A 23-year-old Syrian asylum seeker stabbed six passerby's, killing a 14-year-old boy and injuring five others, including two seriously.	1	6	The attacker was linked to the Islamic State.
Pakistan	February 2025	2025 Darul Uloom Haqqania bombing	The attack took place during Friday prayers, resulting in the deaths of at least six individuals, including the prominent cleric and head of the seminary, Hamid Ul Haq Haqqani. Additionally, approximately 20 others sustained injuries.	7 (+1)	20	The Afghan interior ministry blamed the attack on Islamic State.
Niger	March 2025	Fambita mosque attack	On 21 March 2025, an armed assault targeted a mosque in the southwestern Niger town of Fambita, Kokorou, resulting in at least forty-four fatalities and thirteen injuries. The Nigerien government subsequently declared a three-day national mourning period. Security authorities attributed responsibility for the attack to the Islamic State – Sahel Province (ISSP).	44	13	Government officials released formal statements through both Niger's Ministry of Interior and Ministry of Defense officially attributed responsibility to Islamic State – Sahel Province
Iraq	April 2025	2025 Duhok axe attack	During Assyrian New Year celebrations in Duhok, a Syrian national went on a spree of attacks with an axe, injuring one man and one woman.	0	3 (+1)	Kurdish and Iraqi sources state the attacker was affiliated with the Islamic State, the motive was anti assyrian racism inspired by ISIS.
Pakistan	April 2025	2025 Mastung bus bombing	On April 15, a Bus carrying Pakistani Security Forces was Bombed killing 3 and injured 20 more.	3	20	The Islamic State Khorosan province claimed responsibility
Niger	April 2025	2025 Sakoira and Kandadji Dam attacks	On 24 April a military unit north of Sakoira was ambushed resulting in 12 soldiers' death. The next day at the nearby Kandadji Dam a worksite was attacked and five Indian workers were abducted.	12	5	The Islamic State – Sahel Province claimed responsibility
Syria	May 2025	2025 Southern Syria bombings	On May 22, 2025, ISIS detonated a car bomb targeted a vehicle belonging to Syrian government forces in the Tulul al-Safa region of Suwayda Governorate—a remote desert area in southern Syria. The group claimed the bombing killed or wounded seven soldiers, however, The Britain-based Syrian Observatory for Human Rights said that the attack on government forces had only killed one civilian and wounded three soldiers. It is the first such attack to be claimed by ISIS against the Syrian transitional government since the fall of the 54-year Assad family's rule in December.	1	3	The Islamic State claimed the attack
Syria	May 2025	2025 Southern Syria bombings	On May 28, 2025, ISIS carried out a bombing in the Tulul al-Safa region of Suwayda Governorate, targeting fighters from the U.S.-backed Free Syrian Army. The group used an improvised explosive device (IED) to strike an FSA vehicle, claiming to have killed one fighter and wounded three others.	1	3	The Islamic State claimed the attack
Niger	June 2025	2025 Banibangou attack	An assault on a Nigerien army base on 19 June 2025. The attack occurred in the tri-border region of Niger, Mali, and Burkina Faso. Several hundred militants on over 200 motorbikes and eight vehicles attacked, killing at least 34 soldiers and wounding 14. Nigerien forces reportedly killed dozens of attackers.	34	14	The Islamic State claimed responsibility for the assault in a statement released the following day.
Niger	June 2025	Manda massacre	On June 20, 2025, jihadists from the Islamic State – Sahel Province (ISGS) attacked the village of Manda, Tillabéri Region, Niger, killing at least 71 civilians.	71	20	ISGS claimed the attack
Syria	June 2025	Mar Elias Church attack	On 22 June 2025, at least one attacker affiliated with IS opened fire and detonated an explosive device inside the Greek Orthodox Mar St. Elias Church as people were praying in Damascus, Syria, killing at least 25 people and injuring 63 others. Local media reported children were among the casualties.	25	63	The Syrian Ministry of Interior said the Islamic State was responsible for the attack.
Nigeria	July 2025	2025 Kwallajiya attack	On 1 July, 2025, militants believed to be members of the Lakurawa group launched a raid on Kwallajiya, a village in the Tangaza Local Government Area of Sokoto State, Nigeria. Many were preparing for afternoon prayers, with many victims working on their farms.	15-17 (varying by sources)	"several"	Lakurawa is an armed group affiliated with the Islamic State Sahel Province operating in Mali, Niger, and Kebbi and Sokoto states of Nigeria.
Pakistan	July 2025	2025 Bajaur bombing	An IED exploded under a government vehicle carrying senior administrative officers, resulting in multiple fatalities and injuries.	5	11	The Islamic State claimed responsibility for the attack
Turkey	September 2025	2025 Balçova police station shooting	Suspected Islamic State member attacked a police station in Turkey leaving 2 people dead, and 3 people injured.	3	3 (+1)	An X (Formerly Twitter) account allegedly belonging to the attacker contained a post stating "I will perform a suicide attack soon and become a martyr, Allah willing," along with posts related to the Islamic State, according to reports.
Democratic Republic of the Congo	September 2025	Ntoyo massacre	Islamic State-ADF rebels attacked a Christian funeral wake in the village of Ntoyo, north Kivu, leaving 71 people dead.	71	Unknown	The ADF claimed responsibility for the attack and claimed that they had killed nearly 100 Christians.
United Kingdom	October 2025	Manchester synagogue attack	A man drove a vehicle into a crowd of pedestrians before stabbing Jewish worshippers at a synagogue.	2 (+1)	3	The perpetrator swore allegiance to the Islamic State in a 999 call before being shot dead by police.
Syria	December 2025	December 2025 Palmyra attack	ISIS gunman ambushed U.S. soldiers, killing three (including a civilian translator) and injuring three US soldiers and 2 Syrian soldiers.	3 (+1)	5	Perpetrator killed.
Australia	December 2025	2025 Bondi Beach shooting	Two gunmen killed 15 people in a terrorist attack on a Hanukkah celebration.	15 (+1)	42 (+1)	Both of the gunmen had pledged allegiance to the Islamic State (IS) and two IS flags were found in their car.

== 2026 ==
Country	Date	Article	Description	Dead	Injured	Status
Afghanistan	January 2026	2026 Kabul restaurant bombing	An ISIS suicide bomber blew up inside a Chinese restaurant in Kabul.	7 (+1)	unknown	Islamic State claimed responsibility.
Niger	January 2026	January 2026 Diori Hamani International Airport attack	ISIS gunmen attacked the Diori Hamani International Airport, setting aircraft ablaze. The attackers also used drones, their first use of such weapons in the Sahel.	0 (+20)	4	Islamic State's Sahel Province claimed responsibility.
Pakistan	February 2026	2026 Islamabad mosque bombing	A suicide bomber shot at the gates of a Shi'ite mosque in Islamabad before detonating during Friday prayers.	31 (+1)	169+	Islamic State claimed responsibility
United States	March 2026	2026 New York City bombing attempt	Two men had been radicalized by Islamic State propaganda videos online allegedly threw two bombs into a crowd of people protesting outside of Gracie Mansion. Both bombs failed to detonate.	0	0	Two suspects arrested and charged.
United States	March 2026	2026 Old Dominion University shooting	A man who had been convicted for providing support to IS opened fire on ROTC students at Old Dominion University.	1 (+1)	2	Perpetrator killed by defending students
North Macedonia	April 2026	None	An arson attack occurred at a synagogue in Skopje, North Macedonia.	0	0	The attack was inspired by the Islamic State
Germany	July 2026	2026 Berlin Pride attack	A man, who had previously tried to join ISIS, rammed his vehicle into a crowd at a Pride event in Berlin, killing one and injuring 29.	1 (+1)	29	Perpetrator killed by police during arrest.

== See also ==
- List of Islamist terrorist attacks
- List of terrorists incidents linked to ISIS-K
- List of terrorist incidents, 2014
- List of terrorist incidents, 2015
- List of wars and battles involving ISIL
- List of the terrorist actions against the Mourning of Muharram
