= Mahasin mosque attack =

2016 terrorist attack in Saudi Arabia

Hofuf attack
- Location of Eastern Province in Saudi Arabia
- Location: Mahasin, Easter Province, Saudi Arabia
- Date: 29 January 2016
- Target: Shia Imam Rida mosque
- Attack type: Suicide bombing
- Deaths: 5 (including the perpetrator)
- Injuries: 18
- Perpetrators: Abdulraham Abdullah Suleiman al-Tuwaijiri and Talha Hisham Mohammed Abda
- No. of participants: 2
- Motive: Anti-Shi'ism

The Hofuf attack occurred on 29 January 2016 during Friday prayers at Al-Ridha mosque in the Mahasin district of Al Hofuf, Eastern Province, Saudi Arabia. The attack left four people plus the attacker dead and 18 others injured. The attack consisted of a shooting and suicide bombing and was allegedly directed by ISIL.

The two attackers, Abdurrahman Abdullah Suleiman al-Tuwaijiri (22-year old Saudi citizen) and Talha Hisham Mohammed Abda (Egyptian national), attempted to detonate themselves during Friday prayers at the mosque. Whilst Abdurrahman successfully blew himself up, Talha failed and he was arrested after the attacks.

== See also ==
- List of terrorist incidents in Saudi Arabia
- List of terrorist incidents, January–June 2016
- List of terrorist incidents linked to ISIL
