= Dikwa suicide bombings =

Suicide bombings in Nigeria that occurred in 2016

- Part of the Boko Haram insurgency
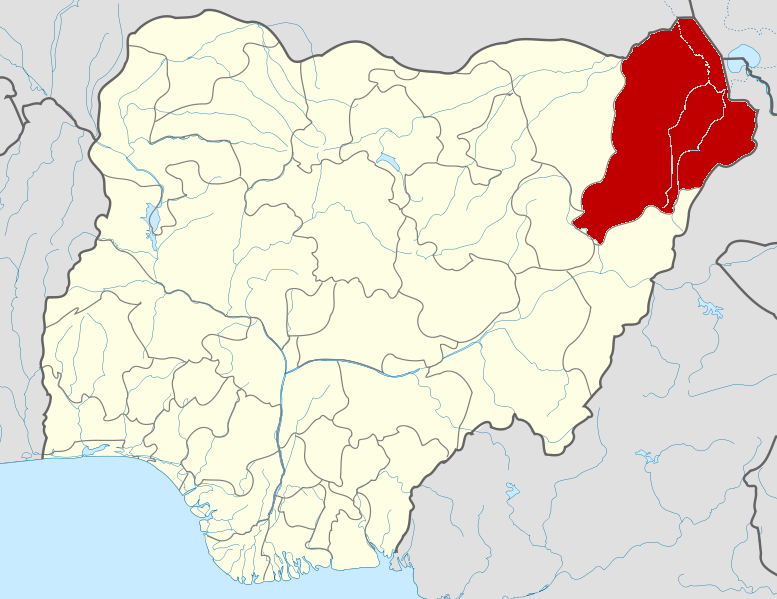
- Location of Borno State in Nigeria
- Location: Dikwa, Borno State Nigeria
- Date: 9 February 2016
- Attack type: Suicide bombing
- Deaths: 60
- Injuries: 78
- Perpetrator: Islamic State of Iraq and the Levant: Boko Haram

On February 9, 2016, two female suicide bombers affiliated with Boko Haram detonated their explosives killing more than 60 people and injured 78 others at a camp for displaced people in Dikwa, Nigeria. Officials said three suicide bombers had infiltrated the camp disguised as refugees at about 6:30 am (5:30 GMT) with two of them, both women between the ages of 17 and 20, setting off their bombs as refugees were queuing for rations. A third bomber identified as Hauwa(but not her real name) refused to kill herself after entering the camp and discovering her relatives were there, while two others also refused to set off their vests and escaped the camp.

== Location ==
The Dikwa camp for internally displaced persons (IDPs) was 90km (55 miles) north-east of Maiduguri, the state capital of Borno and the birthplace of Boko Haram.

== Reactions ==
Nigerian Vice President Yemi Osinbajo addressed the nation after the attack in a statement: "The full weight of the Federal Government’s force will be deployed to hunt down the perpetrators of this evil act and confront terrorists who threaten lives, liberty and property of all Nigerians."

== See also ==
- List of terrorist incidents, January–June 2016
- List of terrorist incidents linked to ISIL
