= Kirkuk flash attack =

On 21 October 2016; IS fighters in early hours of Friday launched a Blitzkrieg styled counterattack on Kirkuk which is an oil rich city that lies in the central-eastern part of Iraq. The attack came as a retaliation as Iraqi forces (Golden Brigade, PMU, other affiliated groups) and coalition forces jointly launched a massive attack from air and land on the stronghold of Islamic State in Mosul with army of over 100,000.

The attack was conducted by 86 fighters from Islamic State who had been planning the attack for days. The targets of the attacks were carefully chosen to be strategic importance. The targets included government buildings and offices, power station, police stations and military checkpoints. As Kurdish police vacated entire city after the news spread of attack, jihadist fighters by end of the day, also returned and left Kirkuk. Soon after, curfew was immediately imposed throughout the city and air strikes were called in.

Police and armed forces returned only after the situation was calm about a day later and started sweeping and clearing out operations.

== Losses ==
Islamic State's assault on Kirkuk, killed 18 members of the security forces and workers at a power station outside the city, including two Iranians, according to a local hospital. Islamic State lost 8 fighters (either KIA or blew themselves up). One Kurdish police officer was taken hostage by the fighters.
