= Kitaya massacre =

2020 attacks on civilians in Tanzania

- Part of Insurgency in Cabo Delgado
- Location: Kitaya, Mtwara Region, Tanzania
- Date: October 15, 2020
- Deaths: 20+
- Perpetrator: IS - Mozambique
- No. of participants: 300

On October 15, 2020, militants from the Islamic State – Central Africa Province, launched an incursion into the village of Kitaya in Mtwara Region, Tanzania, the group's first claimed attack in Tanzania. At least twenty civilians were killed in the massacre.

== Background ==
Islamist insurgents allied with the Islamic State have waged in insurgency in the Cabo Delgado Province in northern Mozambique, on the border with Tanzania, since 2017. While al-Shabaab initially started as local gangs of Mwani militants disgruntled with the Filipe Nyusi government, the group established connections with the Congolese Islamic State – Central Africa Province (ISCAP) in 2018, and ISCAP as a whole has expressed the intention to expand to other East African states like Kenya and Tanzania. In 2017, unknown militants killed twelve police officers in linked attacks in Kabiti and Dar es Salaam.

== Massacre ==
The jihadists made their way to Kitaya by entering Tanzania by sea, and moving up the Ruvuma River that demarcates the Tanzanian-Mozambican border. Tanzanian police estimated that around 300 jihadists took part in the massacre. In videos released by the Islamic State, the attackers were speaking Swahili, Makua, and Mwani, the two latter languages being spoken in northern Mozambique. Villagers in the town helped ISCAP identify which houses to set ablaze, and videos showed the attackers decapitating a man and looting weapons. In the videos, the jihadists' goal was "to kill the infidels", and was unrelated to the election that occurred the next day.

== Aftermath ==
At least twenty people were killed in the massacre in Kitaya. The attack was claimed that same day by ISCAP, and it marked the first confirmed attack in Tanzania by the Mozambican branch of ISCAP. ISCAP launched a second attack in Mtwara province on October 28, killing five people and burning down several homes in Michenjele. In November 2020, Tanzanian police detained an unknown number people from Kigoma, Mwanza, and elsewhere in Tanzania headed to the Tanzanian-Mozambican border to join ISCAP.
