= 2009 Kirkuk bombing =

Terrorist incident in Iraq

2009 Kirkuk bombings
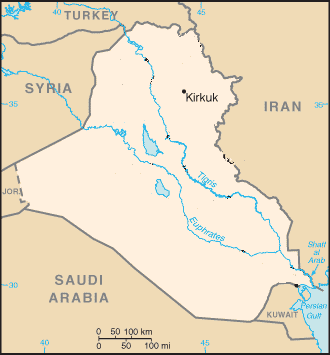
- Location of Kirkuk in Iraq
- Location: Kirkuk, Iraq
- Date: 30 June 2009 (UTC+3)
- Attack type: Suicide bombing and car bomb
- Deaths: 40
- Injuries: 136
- Perpetrator: Unknown

The 2009 Kirkuk bombing was a suicide car bomb attack that occurred on June 30, 2009, in the northern Iraqi city of Kirkuk. The bombing killed 40 people and injured up to 100.

The bomb, which exploded in a crowded district came as U.S. troops were leaving major urban cities in Iraq.

Shortly after the attack, a Peshmerga brigade seized a car loaded with 250 kg of TNT. The explosives were being transported from Kirkuk to Sulaymaniyah.

== Reaction ==
- (Iraq) Iraqi President Jalal Talabani condemned the attack.
