= 2007 Kirkuk bombings =

Terrorist incident in Kirkuk, Iraq

- Location: Kirkuk, Iraq
- Date: July 16, 2007; 8:45 – 9:05 (UTC+3)
- Target: PUK office and a crowded market
- Attack type: Suicide bombing and car bombs
- Deaths: 86
- Injuries: 136 – 180+

The 2007 Kirkuk bombings were a series of three suicide and car bomb attacks that occurred on July 16, 2007, in the northern Iraqi oil city of Kirkuk. The bombing killed 86 people with up to 180 injured.

The first bomb, which caused most of the casualties, exploded in a crowded market close to the offices of the Patriotic Union of Kurdistan, a Kurdish political party led by Iraqi President Jalal Talabani. The massive explosion left a crater several metres deep. More than 20 cars were destroyed and two buildings collapsed completely.

The second attack minutes later targeted a bus station at a nearby market in a commercial area called Iskan and wounded one civilian.

Several hours later, a car bomb exploded in southern Kirkuk, killing a police officer and wounding six others. A fourth car bomb was discovered and made safe.
